= Victory Bell (UCLA–USC) =

Trophy awarded to the winner of the UCLA–USC football game

- UCLA Bruins USC Trojans
- First meeting: September 28, 1929; USC, 76–0
- Latest meeting: November 29, 2025; USC, 29–10
- Next meeting: November 28, 2026, in Pasadena, CA
- Trophy: Victory Bell (since 1942)

Statistics
- Total meetings: 95
- All-time series: USC leads, 52–34–7 (.597)
- Trophy series: USC leads, 49–34–4 (.586)
- Largest victory: USC, 76–0 (1929)
- Longest win streak: UCLA, 8 (1991–1998)
- Current win streak: USC, 2 (2024–present)

Locations of UCLA and USC

The Victory Bell is the trophy that is awarded to the winner of the UCLA–USC football rivalry game. The game is an American college football rivalry between the UCLA Bruins and USC Trojans, part of the overall UCLA–USC rivalry.

The Victory Bell is a 295-pound (134 kg) brass bell that originally rang atop a Southern Pacific railroad locomotive.

Like many rivalry games, the game is played during the final week of the college football season.

== History ==
The bell was given to the UCLA student body in 1939 as a gift from the school's alumni association. Initially, the UCLA cheerleaders rang the bell after each Bruin point. However, during the opening game of UCLA's 1941 season (through 1981, both schools used the Los Angeles Memorial Coliseum for home games), six members of USC's Trojan Knights (who were also members of the Sigma Phi Epsilon fraternity) infiltrated the Bruin rooting section, assisted in loading the bell aboard a truck headed back to Westwood, took the key to the truck, and escaped with the bell while UCLA's actual handlers went to find a replacement key. The bell remained hidden from UCLA students for more than a year, first in SigEp’s basement, then in the Hollywood Hills, Santa Ana, and other locations. At one point, it was even concealed beneath a haystack. Bruin students tried to locate the bell, but to no avail. A picture of the bell appeared in a USC periodical. Tension between UCLA and USC students rose as each started to play even more elaborate and disruptive pranks on the other. When the conflict caused the USC president to threaten to cancel the rivalry, a compromise was met: on November 12, 1942, the student body presidents of both schools, in front of Tommy Trojan, signed the agreement that the bell would be the trophy for the game.

The winner of the annual football game keeps the Victory Bell for the next year, and paints it the school's color: blue for UCLA or cardinal for USC.

For much of the rivalry's history, the Trojans and Bruins have worn their home (colored) jerseys for the game, reflecting the fact that until 1981 both teams played their home games at the Coliseum. A 1983 NCAA rule change mandated that home teams wear colors and away teams wear white jerseys, with violations resulting in the visitors being charged a first-half timeout for illegal equipment. Ahead of the 2008 edition of the game, new UCLA head coach (and former Bruin quarterback) Rick Neuheisel approached his USC counterpart Pete Carroll about reviving the color-versus-color tradition. The two coaches agreed, with UCLA (that year's home team) taking a timeout on the first play of the game as a sporting gesture following the Trojans' illegal equipment penalty. The NCAA would change its rules for the 2009 season allowing for both teams to wear colored jerseys provided the colors contrast and both teams agree to wear colors prior to the start of the game.

== Team traditions ==
=== UCLA ===
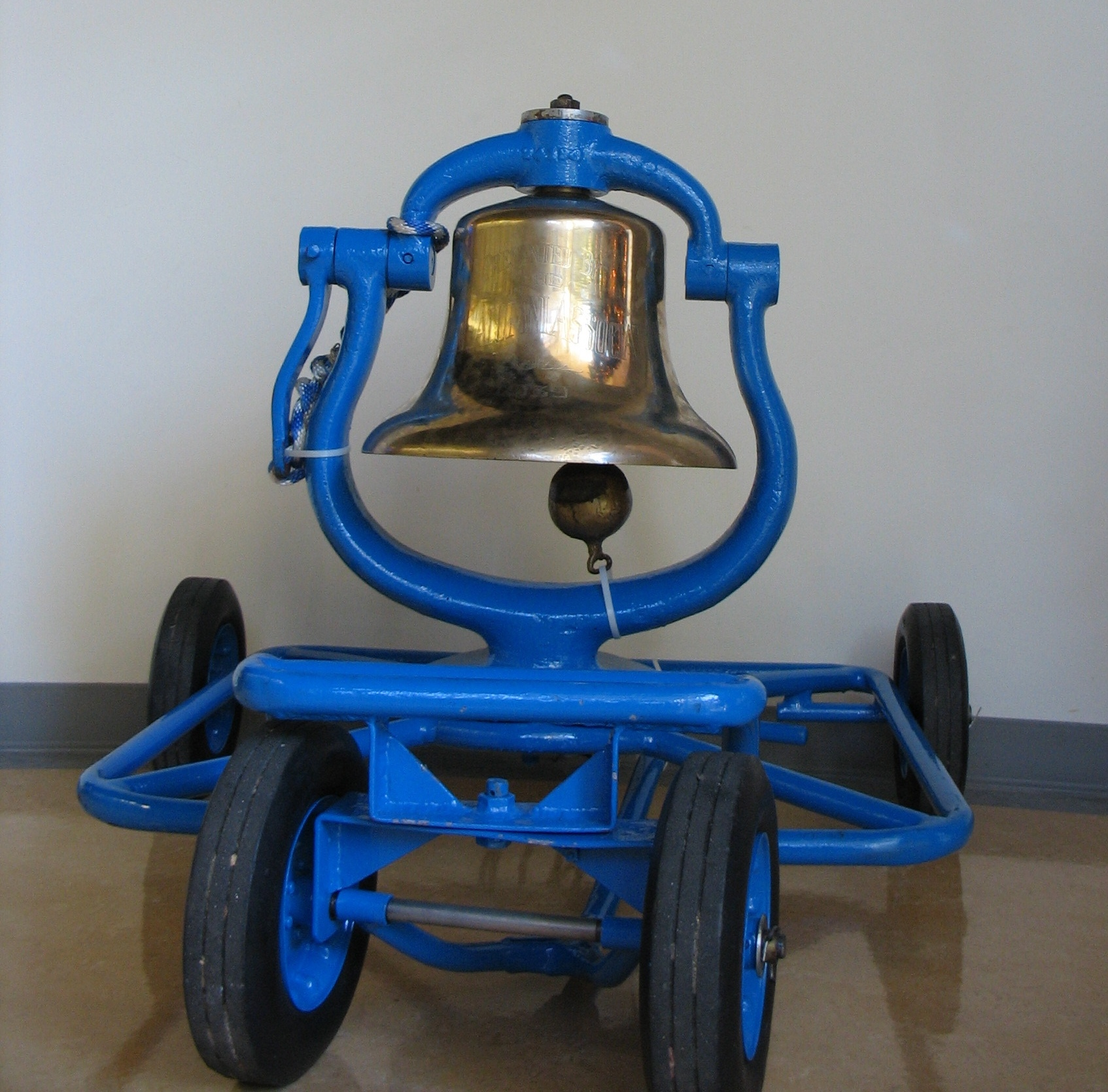
UCLA's possession in blue

When the bell is in UCLA's possession, the carriage is sandblasted and painted "True Blue." While in the possession of UCLA, the bell is safeguarded by the UCLA Rally Committee. During UCLA home games at the Rose Bowl and whenever UCLA faces USC at the L.A. Coliseum, it resides on the field in front of the student section. It is rung by members of the Rally Committee after each score. The Bruins also ring the bell using a rope attached to the handle, swinging the whole bell, as opposed to the Trojan style of attaching a rope to the tongue or clapper on the inside of the bell. The bell also makes special appearances at rallies and athletic events. It has been used to accompany the UCLA Band during halftime shows. In particular, the bell will make an appearance at a major gathering if the bell returns to UCLA.

=== USC ===
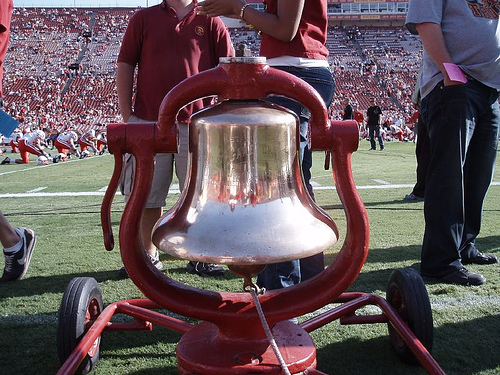
The bell in USC cardinal

Before home games, when the bell is in USC's possession, it sits along Trousdale Parkway for fans to ring as they participate in the "Trojan Walk" to the L.A. Coliseum. During home games, and whenever USC faces UCLA at the Rose Bowl, the Victory Bell is displayed at the edge of the field for the first three quarters of the game. Members of the Trojan Knights ring the bell every time the Trojans score. The carriage is painted cardinal red.

== Series record ==
The first victory for UCLA in the series occurred after the agreement over the Victory Bell, making the Bruins the first winner of the trophy. The Bruins made their post-season appearance after the 1942 season in the Rose Bowl. The teams played each other twice in the same season in 1943, 1944, and 1945, due to travel restrictions during World War II; of those six, USC won five and tied the other.

As of the 2025 season, USC leads 54–34–7 (record excludes two vacated USC wins due to NCAA penalty for violation of NCAA rules). Before the streak of seven Trojan wins, the Bruins had won the bell for the eight consecutive years from 1991–1998, the longest streak in the rivalry. There have been seven ties in the history of the series. In the event of a tie, the Victory Bell was retained by the last winner. With the institution of the overtime rule in FBS in 1996, the tie rule became obsolete. There has been one overtime game in the series in 1996.

== Game results ==
From 1929 until 1981, the two teams both played in the Los Angeles Memorial Coliseum; the Rose Bowl became UCLA's home field in 1982.

UCLA victories	USC victories	Ties	Forfeits / Vacated wins

No.	Date	Location	Winning team	Losing team	Score
1	September 28, 1929	USC	USC	UCLA	76–0
2	September 27, 1930	UCLA	USC	UCLA	52–0
3	November 26, 1936	USC	Tie		7–7
4	December 4, 1937	USC	USC	UCLA	19–13
5	November 24, 1938	USC	#14 USC	UCLA	42–7
6	December 9, 1939	UCLA	Tie		0–0
7	November 30, 1940	USC	USC	UCLA	28–12
8	December 6, 1941	UCLA	Tie		7–7
9	December 12, 1942	USC	#13 UCLA	USC	17–14
10	September 25, 1943	UCLA	USC	UCLA	20–0
11	November 27, 1943	USC	USC	UCLA	26–13
12	September 23, 1944	USC	Tie		13–13
13	November 25, 1944	UCLA	#8 USC	UCLA	40–13
14	September 21, 1945	UCLA	USC	UCLA	13–6
15	December 1, 1945	USC	USC	UCLA	26–15
16	November 23, 1946	UCLA	#4 UCLA	#10 USC	16–13
17	November 22, 1947	USC	#4 USC	#18 UCLA	6–0
18	November 20, 1948	UCLA	USC	UCLA	20–13
19	November 19, 1949	USC	USC	UCLA	21–7
20	November 25, 1950	UCLA	UCLA	USC	39–0
21	November 24, 1951	USC	#18 UCLA	#11 USC	21–7
22	November 22, 1952	UCLA	#4 USC	#3 UCLA	14–12
23	November 21, 1953	USC	#5 UCLA	#9 USC	13–0
24	November 20, 1954	UCLA	#2 UCLA	#7 USC	34–0
25	November 19, 1955	USC	#5 UCLA	USC	17–7
26	November 24, 1956	UCLA	USC	UCLA	10–7
27	November 23, 1957	USC	UCLA	USC	20–9
28	November 22, 1958	UCLA	Tie		15–15
29	November 21, 1959	USC	UCLA	#4 USC	10–3
30	November 19, 1960	UCLA	USC	#11 USC	17–6
31	November 25, 1961	USC	UCLA	USC	10–7
32	November 24, 1962	UCLA	#1 USC	UCLA	14–3
33	November 30, 1963	USC	USC	UCLA	26–6
34	November 21, 1964	UCLA	USC	UCLA	34–13
35	November 20, 1965	USC	#7 UCLA	#6 USC	20–16
36	November 19, 1966	UCLA	#8 UCLA	#7 USC	14–7
37	November 18, 1967	USC	#4 USC	#1 UCLA	21–20
38	November 23, 1968	UCLA	#1 USC	UCLA	28–16
39	November 22, 1969	USC	#5 USC	#6 UCLA	14–12
40	November 21, 1970	UCLA	UCLA	USC	45–20
41	November 20, 1971	USC	Tie		7–7
42	November 18, 1972	UCLA	#1 USC	#14 UCLA	24–7
43	November 24, 1973	USC	#9 USC	#8 UCLA	23–13
44	November 23, 1974	UCLA	#8 USC	USC	34–9
45	November 28, 1975	USC	#14 UCLA	USC	25–22
46	November 20, 1976	UCLA	#3 USC	#2 UCLA	24–14
47	November 25, 1977	USC	USC	#17 UCLA	29–27
48	November 18, 1978	UCLA	#5 USC	#14 UCLA	17–10
49	November 24, 1979	USC	#4 USC	UCLA	49–14
50	November 22, 1980	UCLA	#18 UCLA	#12 USC	20–17
51	November 21, 1981	USC	#10 USC	#15 UCLA	22–21
52	November 20, 1982	Rose Bowl	#11 UCLA	#15 USC	20–19
53	November 19, 1983	Coliseum	UCLA	USC	27–17
54	November 17, 1984	Rose Bowl	#7 UCLA	USC	29–10
55	November 23, 1985	Coliseum	USC	#8 UCLA	17–13
56	November 22, 1986	Rose Bowl	#18 UCLA	#10 USC	45–25
57	November 21, 1987	Coliseum	USC	#15 UCLA	17–13
58	November 19, 1988	Rose Bowl	#2 USC	#6 UCLA	31–22
59	November 18, 1989	Coliseum	Tie		10–10
60	November 17, 1990	Rose Bowl	#19 USC	UCLA	45–42
61	November 23, 1991	Coliseum	#25 UCLA	USC	24–21
62	November 21, 1992	Rose Bowl	UCLA	#15 USC	38–37
63	November 20, 1993	Coliseum	#16 UCLA	#22 USC	27–21
64	November 19, 1994	Rose Bowl	UCLA	#13 USC	31–19
65	November 18, 1995	Coliseum	UCLA	#11 USC	24–20
66	November 23, 1996	Rose Bowl	UCLA	USC	48–41^{(2 OT)}
67	November 22, 1997	Coliseum	#7 UCLA	USC	31–24
68	November 21, 1998	Rose Bowl	#3 UCLA	USC	34–17
69	November 20, 1999	Coliseum	USC	UCLA	17–7
70	November 18, 2000	Rose Bowl	USC	UCLA	38–35
71	November 17, 2001	Coliseum	USC	#20 UCLA	27–0
72	November 23, 2002	Rose Bowl	#7 USC	#25 UCLA	52–21
73	November 22, 2003	Coliseum	#2 USC	UCLA	47–22
74	December 4, 2004	Rose Bowl	#1 USC^{†}	UCLA	29–24
75	December 3, 2005	Coliseum	#1 USC^{†}	#11 UCLA	66–19
76	December 2, 2006	Rose Bowl	UCLA	#2 USC	13–9
77	December 1, 2007	Coliseum	#8 USC	UCLA	24–7
78	December 6, 2008	Rose Bowl	#5 USC	UCLA	28–7
79	November 28, 2009	Coliseum	#24 USC	UCLA	28–7
80	December 4, 2010	Rose Bowl	USC	UCLA	28–14
81	November 26, 2011	Coliseum	#10 USC	UCLA	50–0
82	November 17, 2012	Rose Bowl	#17 UCLA	#21 USC	38–28
83	November 30, 2013	Coliseum	#22 UCLA	#23 USC	35–14
84	November 22, 2014	Rose Bowl	#11 UCLA	#24 USC	38–20
85	November 28, 2015	Coliseum	USC	#22 UCLA	40–21
86	November 19, 2016	Rose Bowl	#13 USC	UCLA	36–14
87	November 18, 2017	Coliseum	#11 USC	UCLA	28–23
88	November 17, 2018	Rose Bowl	UCLA	USC	34–27
89	November 23, 2019	Coliseum	#23 USC	UCLA	52–35
90	December 12, 2020	Rose Bowl	#15 USC	UCLA	43–38
91	November 20, 2021	Coliseum	UCLA	USC	62–33
92	November 19, 2022	Rose Bowl	#7 USC	#16 UCLA	48–45
93	November 18, 2023	Coliseum	UCLA	USC	38–20
94	November 23, 2024	Rose Bowl	USC	UCLA	19–13
95	November 29, 2025	Coliseum	#17 USC	UCLA	29–10
96	November 28, 2026	Rose Bowl			
Series: USC leads 52–34–7
† USC vacated 2004 and 2005 victories

== See also ==
- Southern California Crosstown Cup
- Victory Bell (disambiguation) – Other trophies also called the "Victory Bell"
- Jeweled Shillelagh
- List of NCAA college football rivalry games
