= Trojan Knights =

Student group at the University of Southern California

- Founded: September 20, 1921; 105 years ago University of Southern California
- Type: Service
- Affiliation: Independent
- Status: Active
- Emphasis: Campus traditions
- Scope: Local
- Pillars: Brotherhood, Service, and Spirit
- Colors: Cardinal and Gold
- Chapters: 1
- Nickname: The Knights
- Headquarters: Los Angeles, California; United States
- Website: usctrojanknights.org

The Trojan Knights are a student service and spirit organization at the University of Southern California in Los Angeles, California. It is officially dedicated to "Brotherhood, Service, & Spirit" and its members have been recognized by USC as the "Official Hosts of the University" and "Guardians of Tradition."

The group has been a part of many university traditions and remains active in on- and off-campus events and causes. While not a traditional Greek fraternity, the Trojan Knights have many characteristics similar to fraternities, including their emphasis on brotherhood. The Trojan Knights currently involve themselves in several service events including the USC founded "Swim with Mike," benefiting a scholarship for disabled persons aspiring to attend college, and the annual "Trojan Knights Carnival," a carnival held on Los Angeles's Skid Row benefiting the children of those families.

== History ==
The Knights were founded in 1921 by USC students Harry Pryor, Harry Kennedy, and Lindley Bothwell.

Bothwell is also credited with numerous other contributions to USC's spirit activities including coaching both USCs Song Girls and the now-defunct USC Yell Leaders and, along with fellow founder Harry Pryor, the introduction of organized card stunts at football games in 1922.

In the early years, the organization's recruiting process was systematically tied to that of the university's Greek fraternities, and the majority of new members were also members of a Greek-letter fraternity. Emblematic of these early ties is the fact that Lindley Bothwell is also credited with helping to found the USC chapter of the Sigma Alpha Epsilon fraternity five years later in 1926, though the national organization ultimately revoked the chapter's charter in 2014 after allegations of both sexual assault and hazing.

== Symbols ==
The Trojan's Knights pillars are Brotherhood, Service, and Spirit.

== Activity ==
After the USC-UCLA rivalry game in 1941, six Trojan Knights (also members of the Sigma Phi Epsilon fraternity) discreetly plotted and carried out what is now politely referred to as the 'appropriation' of the Victory Bell from the UCLA sidelines. After a year-long prank war between the schools and threats by the administration to cancel that year's game, the bell was returned and subsequently made the official rivalry trophy of the annual game by contract between the student body presidents of the two universities.

In 1946, a Knight rescued a dog from a Santa Monica beach. A year later, after becoming a common sight around campus, the dog (named George Tirebiter) would become USC's unofficial mascot. Knights would continue to care for the dog who was later killed in a car crash. A statue honoring the dog's memory currently stands at the south end of Trousdale Parkway on the USC campus.

The Knights are also linked to the origins of Traveler, the white horse that currently serves as USC's official mascot. Although the first official 'Traveler' did not appear until 1961, a Trojan Knight named Arthur J. Gontier III rode a white horse at a USC football game in 1954. This, along with an earlier appearance by a horse in 1948, set a precedent for what has become a long USC tradition of equine mascots.

The Knights later received national media attention after the "Westwood Sucks" card stunt incident. During the 1971 ABC broadcast of the USC-UCLA rivalry game, only the middle part of a Knights-organized card stunt meant to read "Why do people go to UCLA? Westwood sucks...them in" made the air.

Throughout this time, Knights were also involved in arranging and hosting university events not related to athletics. In his memoir, Awakening Waves, Alumnus Richard LeVine recalls using his position as a Trojan Knight in 1960 to arrange campus speaking engagements with then-presidential candidates Richard Nixon and John F. Kennedy.

== Trojan Knights in the 2000s ==
The Knights have gained national visibility as a result of their activities during each fall's football season. Knights have been featured on ESPN's College GameDay body-painting with the school colors and letters spelling out messages. More recently, they gained national attention when caught on camera while Anav Saxena (painted with the letter "G") was using the bathroom, leaving just the letters "Fiht On!" Saxena swiftly hurried back, but not before the incident had made it onto ESPN and a number of other news sources.

The Knights are also involved in various "rivalry week" activities surrounding the annual game against UCLA. The Knights stand guard night and day at the base of USC's Tommy Trojan Statue, a common target of past UCLA pranks, for the week prior to the game and organize an annual bonfire at which a representation of the UCLA Bruin mascot is burned. In recent years, the Knights have taken to wrapping Tommy Trojan in cellophane, and to building a doghouse around the George Tirebiter statue.

The Knights also guard the Victory Bell on game days, and ring it after touchdowns during the first three quarters of all home games when it is in USC possession.

Beyond their work as a spirit organization, the Knights participate at many on- and off-campus events and causes at USC. The Knights work alongside their sister organization, the USC Helenes, as well as other USC student organizations, fraternities, sororities and athletic teams at USC's annual "Swim With Mike" philanthropy event. According to the group's website, they also host other social and philanthropic events including an annual Fall philanthropy fundraiser known as "Tirebiter Run" that raises funds for the "Keep Kids Safe" campaign of "A Better LA". In addition, Knights work as volunteer staff during various university-hosted events.

In 2022, the Trojan Knights became a gender-inclusive organization and opened their membership to women.

== Famous alumni ==
Famous alumni of the organization include actors John Wayne and Tom Selleck, who were also both members of Sigma Chi, Disneyland's First President Jack Lindquist, the "winningest" college baseball coach of all time Raoul "Rod" Dedeaux, Nevada Senator Dean A. Heller, Richard Nixon's USC Mafia Members Donald H. Segretti and Dwight Chapin, and real estate developer and Chairman of the Board of Trustees of the University of Southern California Rick J. Caruso.

== Sister Organization ==
The officially recognized sister organization of the Trojan Knights is the USC Helenes, known as the "Official Hostesses of the University."

== See also ==
- List of social fraternities and sororities
