= Tommy Trojan =

Statue at the University of Southern California

Coordinates: 34.02051°N 118.28563°W

- Artist: Roger Noble Burnham
- Medium: Bronze sculpture statue
- Location: Los Angeles, California, United States

Tommy Trojan, officially known as the Trojan Shrine, is one of the most recognizable figures of school pride at the University of Southern California in Los Angeles, California, United States. The life-size bronze statue of a Trojan warrior stands in the center of campus and serves as a popular meeting spot, as well as a centerpiece for a number of campus events. It is the most popular unofficial mascot of the university.

== History ==
The Trojan Shrine was sculpted by Roger Noble Burnham, who used USC football players such as Russ Saunders, Ernie Pinckert, Henry Becker, Larry Stevens and John Ward as visual references for the statue. It was unveiled during the University's 50th Jubilee in 1930. It cost $10,000 to build, after which a $1 surcharge was added onto the season football tickets in order to help offset this cost.

The original name suggested for the statue was The Spirit of Troy, but that name went to the school's marching band.

== Features ==
Tommy Trojan is located at the core of the campus and often serves as a meeting ground for students and visitors. Many people take pictures with the statue. The Shrine is surrounded by the Bovard Administration Building, Ronald Tutor Campus Center, and Alumni Park. Trousdale Parkway passes next to the statue. USC offers the Tommy Cam, which is a live image of the statue, with daily time-lapse videos. Inscribed on the base of the statue are the five attributes of the ideal Trojan: Faithful, Scholarly, Skillful, Courageous and Ambitious. On the reverse is a plaque bearing a quote by Virgil: "Here are provided seats of meditative joy, where shall rise again the destined reign of Troy."

== Vandalism ==
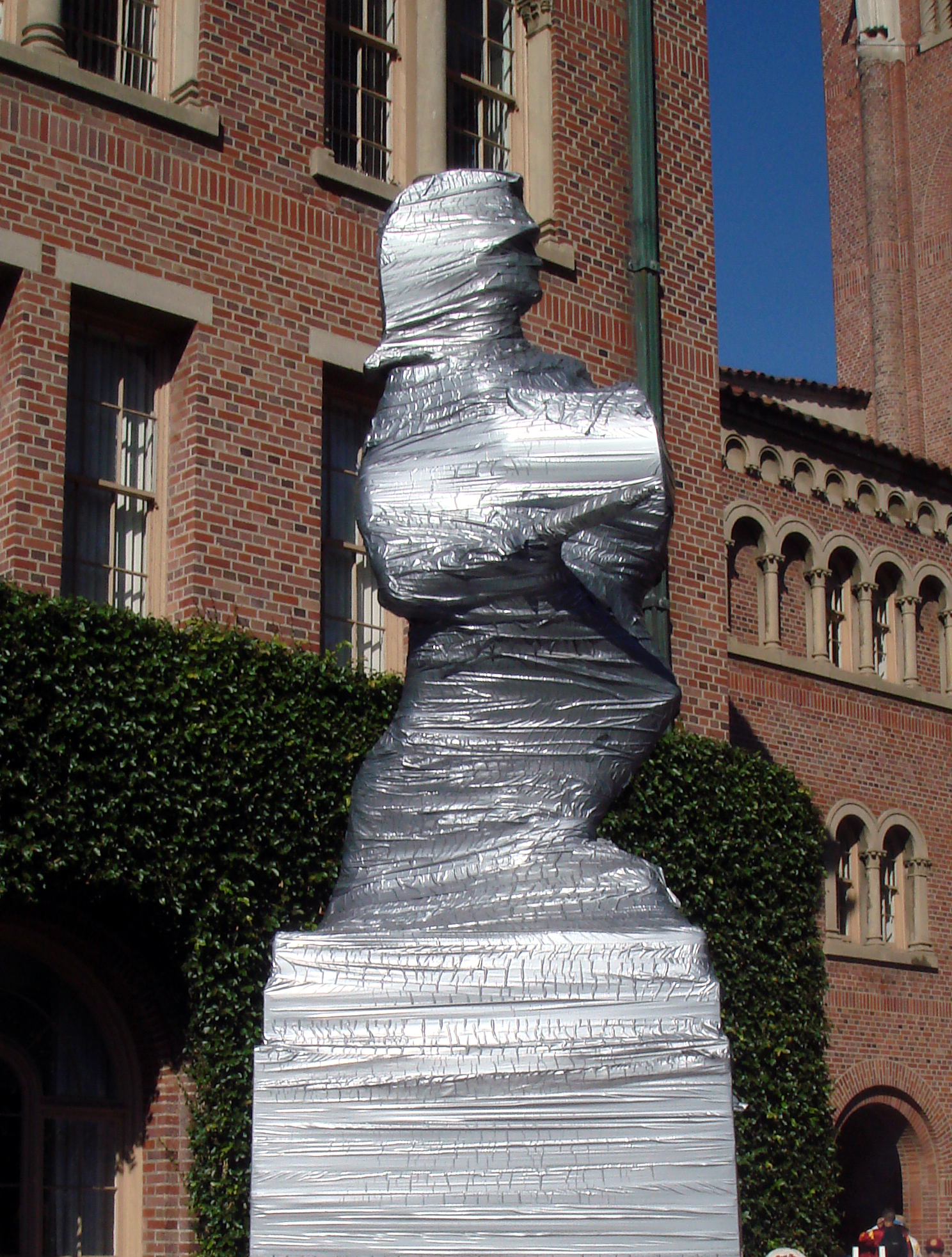
Tommy Trojan covered with duct tape in preparation for the UCLA football game.

USC's cross-town rival UCLA had vandalized Tommy Trojan (often by painting the statue in the UCLA colors of blue and gold) during the week of the annual USC-UCLA football game. To prevent this, university officials now cover the statue during that week to protect it from UCLA vandals. Students also gather for Save Tommy Night on the night before the game against UCLA. In addition, members of the Trojan Knights maintain an all-night vigil around Tommy Trojan during the rivalry week and USC's Department of Public Safety Surveillance Operations team, monitor the statue with CCTV to further deter would-be vandals.

== Identity ==
Many people identify Tommy Trojan as the symbol of the university. However, Tommy Trojan is not USC's official mascot; that title belongs to Traveler, a white Andalusian horse. Before Traveler, a real local dog named George Tirebiter served as the unofficial mascot. A statue of the dog is also a feature of the campus.
