= UCLA–USC rivalry =

American collegiate athletics rivalry

Locations of UCLA and USC

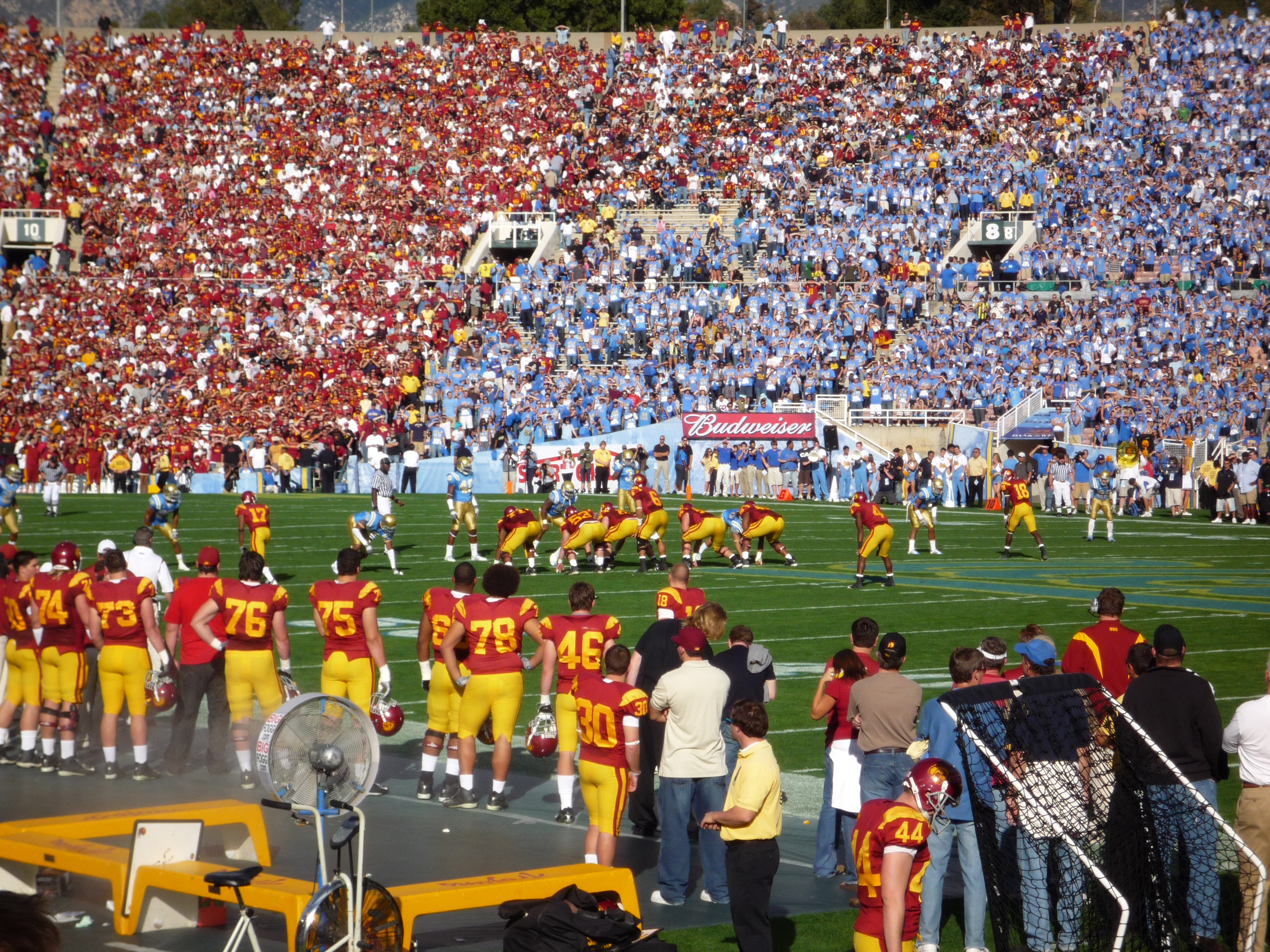
USC–UCLA football game at the Rose Bowl; the 2008 edition marked a return to the tradition of both teams wearing color jerseys.

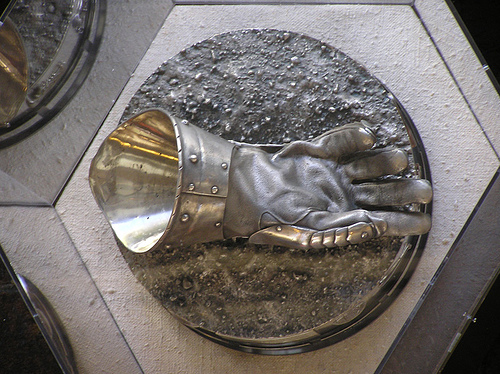
USC UCLA Lexus Gauntlet

The UCLA–USC rivalry is the American collegiate athletics rivalry between the UCLA Bruins sports teams of the University of California, Los Angeles (UCLA) and USC Trojans teams of the University of Southern California (USC).

Both universities are located in Los Angeles and moved together to the Big Ten Conference from the Pac-12 Conference in 2024. The rivalry between the two is among the more unusual in National Collegiate Athletic Association (NCAA) Division I sports, because the campuses are only 12 miles (19 km) apart, and both are located within the same city.

UCLA and USC are second and third respectively on the list of NCAA schools with the most NCAA Division I championships. Only Stanford University, a former conference opponent also located in California, has more than either UCLA or USC.

== Background ==
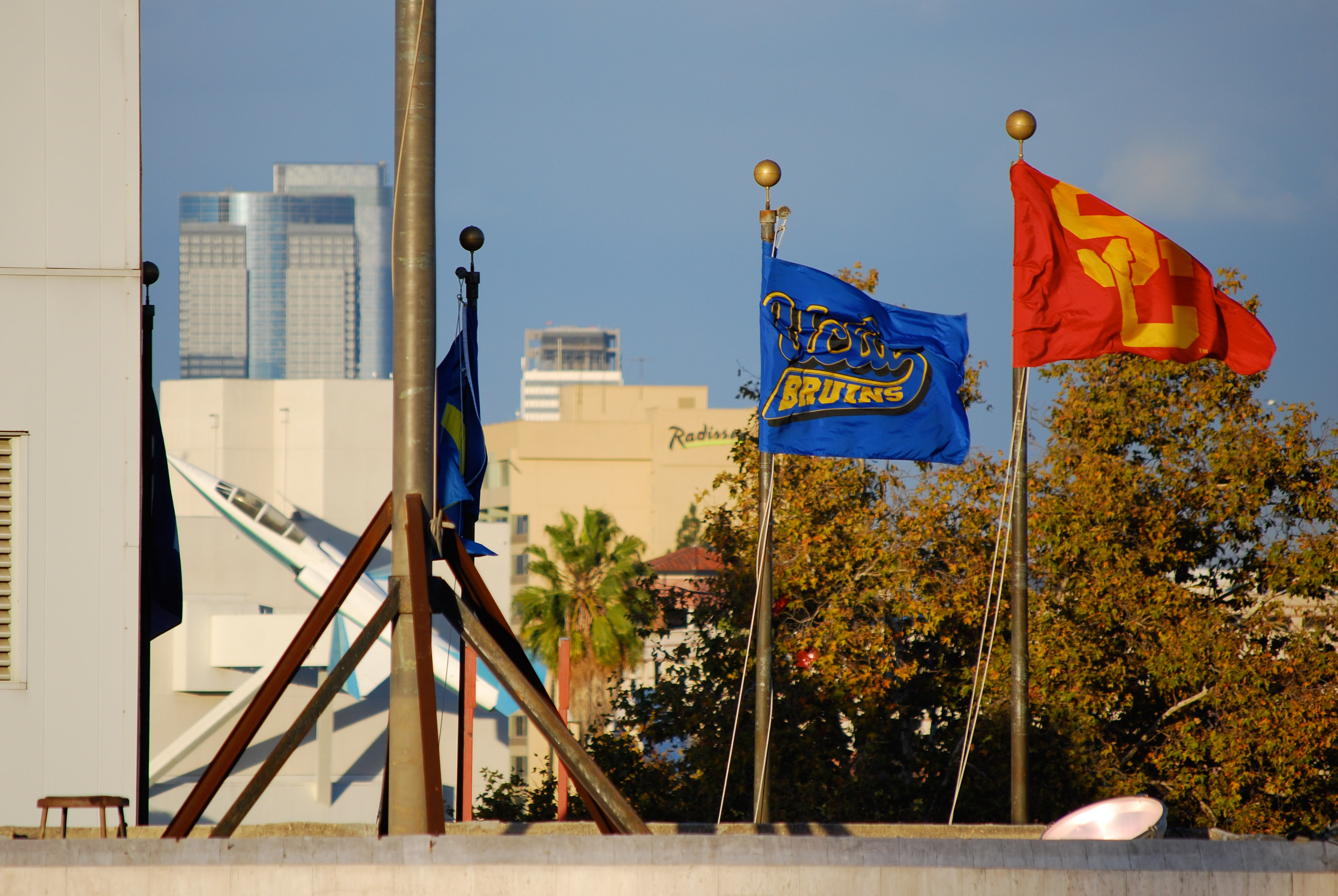
UCLA's and USC's flag.

The schools have been together in the same athletic conference since 1928, when UCLA joined USC in the Pacific Coast Conference, a predecessor of the Pac-12 Conference. USC had joined the PCC in 1922. When the PCC broke up after the 1958-1959 season, USC and UCLA were charter members of the newly formed Athletic Association of Western Universities. The AAWU, with expansion, would become the Pac-8, Pac-10, and then the Pac-12 Conference. USC is recognized as consistently being one of the top football programs in the nation, while UCLA is recognized as consistently being one of the top basketball programs in the nation. However, a somewhat rare confluence of events occurred in 1954, which began with USC in its last of only two Final Four appearances in the 1954 NCAA basketball tournament (Note: The NCAA did not split into divisions until the 1956–57 school year, creating the University and College Divisions at that time. It adopted its current three-division setup in 1973–74, with the University Division becoming Division I and the College Division split into today's Divisions II and III. Championships in women's sports were not added until 1981–82.) and ended with UCLA winning its only non-NCAA Football National Championship. Both schools also are successful in many "non-revenue" or "Olympic" sports. Both have had success in track and field, water polo, tennis, volleyball, and golf. As of 2023, USC has won 26 NCAA championships in men's outdoor track and field, 21 in men's tennis, and 12 in baseball, the most of any school in each respective sport. Likewise, UCLA has won 20 NCAA championships in men's volleyball and 12 in softball, also the most of any school in those sports. Both also are the only schools to have won official NCAA championships in beach volleyball, with USC winning 5 and UCLA 2.

As of June 2024, UCLA ranked second overall and USC ranked third overall in NCAA team championships behind Stanford. Both schools also have several non-NCAA championships, including AIAW and pre-NCAA championships.

== Crosstown Cup ==
The Crosstown Cup, formerly the Lexus Gauntlet, the Crosstown Gauntlet, and the SoCal BMW Crosstown Cup, is the name given to a competition between UCLA and USC in the 19 NCAA-sanctioned varsity sports in which both compete. (Although slightly different scoring rules were in effect in the different versions of the competition.) In 2003, 2005, and 2007 UCLA won the Lexus Gauntlet Trophy, while USC won the trophy in 2002, 2004, 2006, 2008, and 2009 (the first back-to-back win). After the 2009 season, Lexus stopped sponsoring the award. The competition was renamed the Crosstown Gauntlet, which USC won in 2010, 2011, 2012, and 2014, and UCLA won in 2013. In 2015, due to new sponsorship, the competition became the SoCal BMW Crosstown Cup. It was won by UCLA in 2015 and USC in 2016, when the sponsorship arrangement concluded. The competition has since been known simply as the Crosstown Cup. UCLA won the Crosstown Cup in 2017 and 2018; USC won in 2019 and 2021, with the 2020 competition being suspended due to the COVID-19 pandemic.

== Football rivalry ==
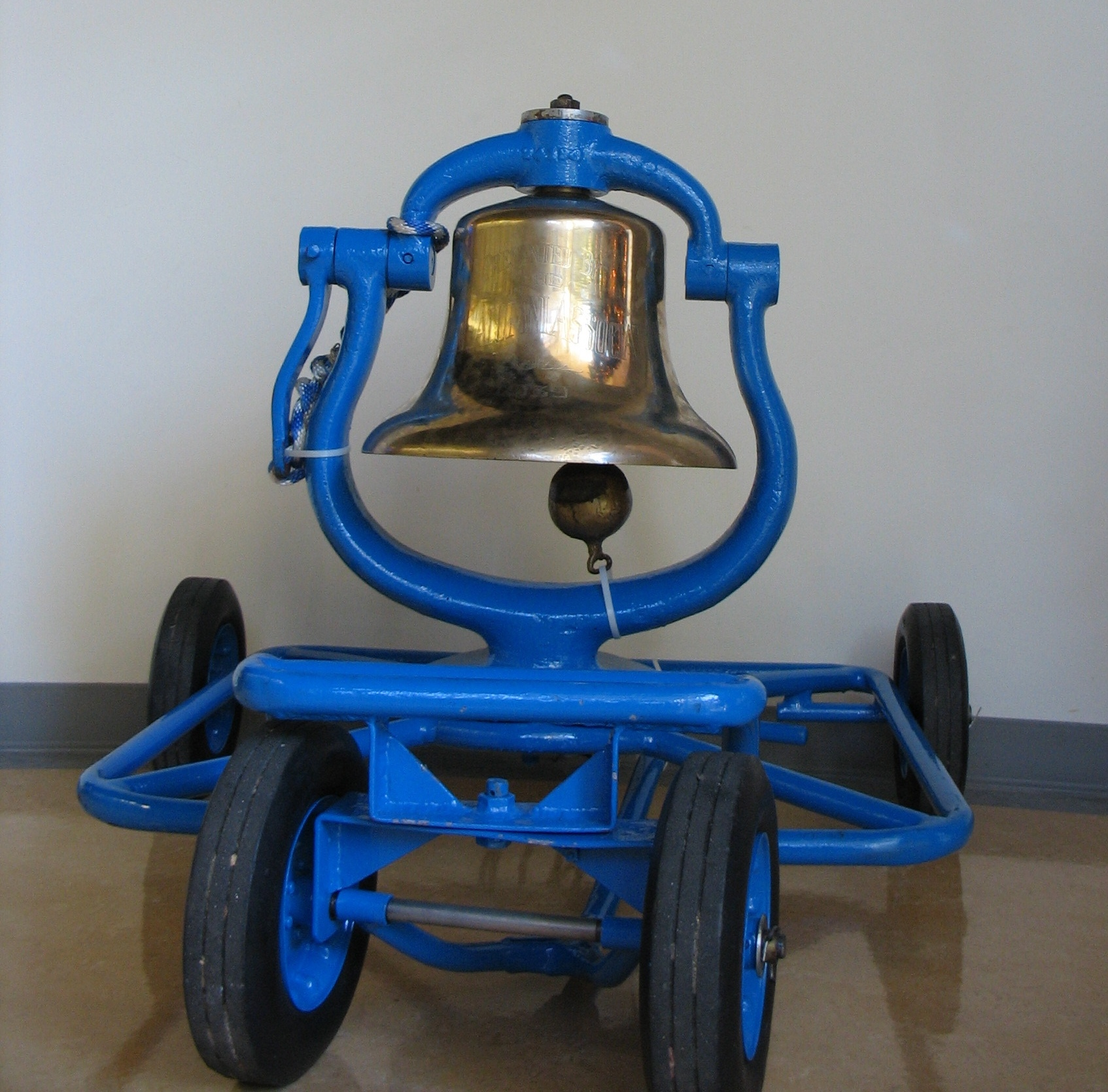
UCLA's possession of the Victory Bell in blue

Both football teams are often among the top in the West Coast. The winner of the rivalry football game has often won or shared the Pac-12 Conference (Pac-12) title. A berth in the Rose Bowl game has been on the line many times as well for both schools. Both teams have spoiled conference and national championship runs for the other.

Since the 1916 formation of the Pacific Coast Conference, which the Pac-12 claims as part of its history, USC has won or shared 37 conference titles and UCLA has won or shared 17 titles. Washington is second in overall conference titles with 18. Since the 1959 season, when the Pac-12 was formed as the Athletic Association of Western Universities, through the 2007 season, the schools have won or shared 33 of the 48 conference titles.

USC has won 17 conference championships outright, shared eight and gone to the Rose Bowl or BCS bowl 21 times. UCLA has won six conference championships outright, shared five and gone to the Rose Bowl eight times. The schools have thrice shared the conference championship.

In 2011, UCLA became the first Pac-12 South Division champion – while USC held the better of the two records, the Trojans were ineligible for postseason play that year due to NCAA sanctions.

USC began a rise to national prominence under Howard Jones in 1925. The Trojans began a major rivalry with Notre Dame in 1926. UCLA joined the Pacific Coast Conference in 1928. Los Angeles Times sportswriter Braven Dyer predicted on the day of the first football meeting on September 28, 1929, "In years to come, this game will probably be one of the football spectacles of the West" USC dominated the early games (so much so, that after the first two games, the series was suspended for five years and they did not play each other from 1931 to 1935) until UCLA established itself.

By the late 1930s, star players such as Kenny Washington, Jackie Robinson, and Bob Waterfield enabled UCLA to be competitive. With the hiring of Hall of Fame coach Henry "Red" Sanders, UCLA became the more dominant program in the 1950s and won their first and only National Championship in 1954. A famous quote was attributed to Sanders regarding the rivalry, "Beating 'SC is not a matter of life or death, it's more important than that."

Sanders died suddenly of a heart attack before the 1959 season. In 1960 John McKay, the winningest coach is USC football history, took over the struggling USC program. Upon the arrival of McKay, USC entered a new golden age in its storied history. During McKay's tenure, the Trojans won 8 conference titles, 5 Rose Bowls, produced two Heisman Trophy winners (Mike Garrett and O. J. Simpson) and won three national championships (1962, 1967, and 1972) and shared one (1974). Against UCLA, McKay was tough to beat, posting a 10–5–1 record against the Bruins between 1960 and 1975. McKay's favorite saying was, "There is nothing worse than losing to UCLA and nothing better than beating Notre Dame." Tommy Prothro was the UCLA coach who posted the wins against McKay's teams, and drew more attention to the rivalry.

For most seasons from the mid-1960s to the end of the 1970s, the two schools were the top powers on the West Coast with USC usually holding the top spot. In the 15 Rose Bowls played from 1966 to 1980, USC or UCLA played in 12 of them. Even with the rise of Don James' Washington Huskies in the 1980s and early 90s, UCLA or USC still went to the Rose Bowl seven times between 1981 and 1995. In the 1990s, UCLA enjoyed an eight-game winning streak against USC.

The Bruins' unbeaten string ended in 1999 when the Trojans began their longest win streak, 7, against the Bruins, though two of those wins (2004 and 2005) are now vacated, cutting the USC streak to five. Pete Carroll was hired by USC in December 2000. During Carroll's tenure (2001–2009 seasons), USC was virtually unbeatable against its two most heated rivals, UCLA and Notre Dame. The only game that UCLA beat a Pete Carroll-coached team was the 13–9 win in 2006 at the Rose Bowl that kept USC out of the BCS Championship game and allowed the Bruins to keep the record for consecutive wins (8) in the rivalry.

=== Title of the game ===
A number of titles have been applied to the football game such as: "The Los Angeles City Championship", "The Crosstown Showdown", "The Battle of L.A. or Los Angeles", or simply the "crosstown rivalry". None have become the singular name for the game. Most often the game is referred to as the USC–UCLA (or UCLA–USC) football game by the media. Fans of a particular team refer to it as the USC game or UCLA game, using the name of the opposing school.

=== Activities before the game ===
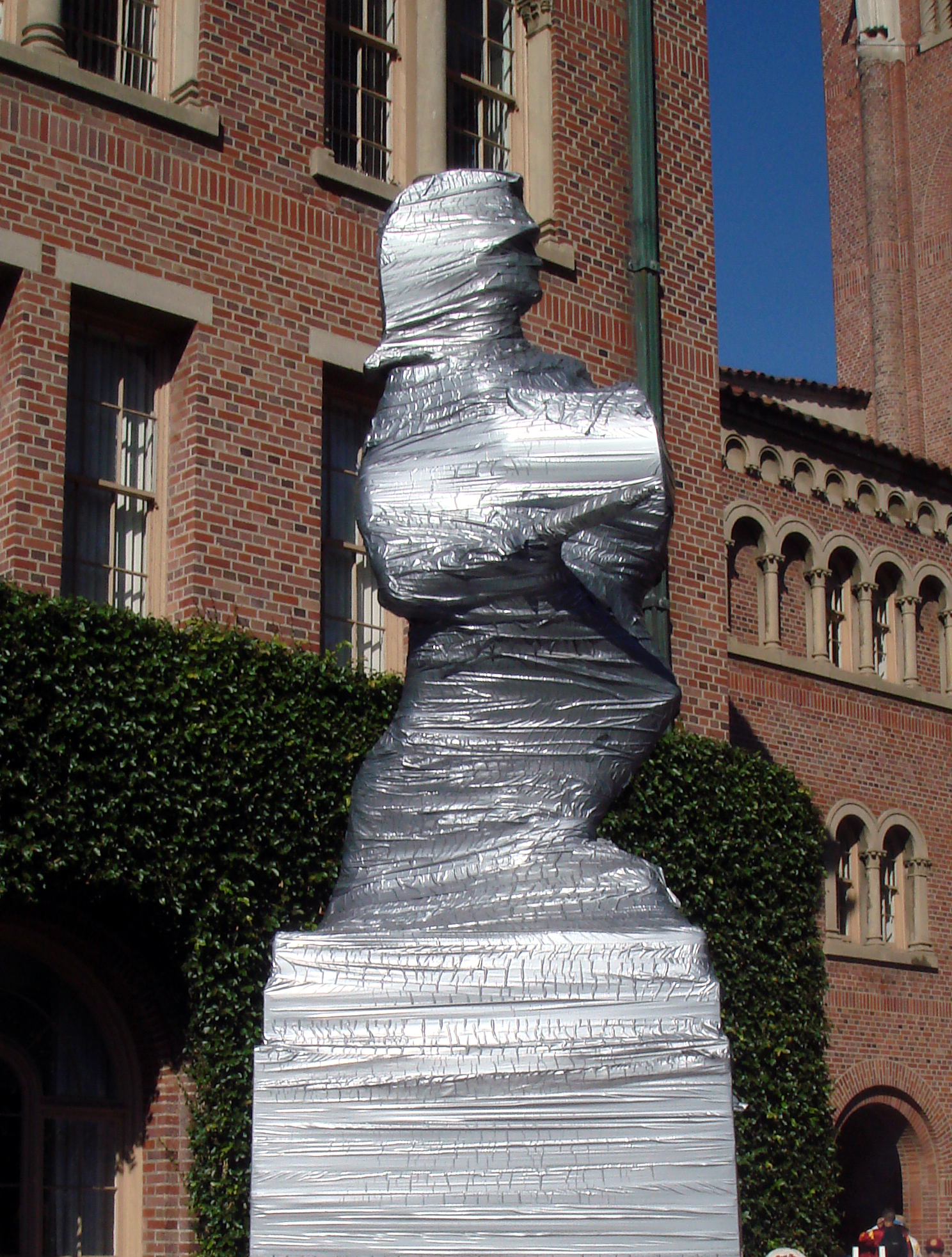
"Tommy Trojan" wrapped in duct tape during rivalry week

At UCLA, the week before the game is known as "Beat 'SC Week" (officially dubbed "Blue and Gold Week"). At USC, the week before the game is known as "Troy Week" during which the "Conquest" rally is held.

Both schools host a number of activities on their respective campuses during the week to promote school spirit. Activities include parades, bonfires, rallies, and live entertainment.

Also, both schools take steps to prevent vandalism of two major landmarks on campus: USC wraps its Trojan Shrine (better known as "Tommy Trojan") in bubble wrap and duct tape, while UCLA covers its Bruin Bear statue with tarp stating "THE BRUIN BEAR IS HIBERNATING. BEAT 'SC.", and more recently a $5000 wooden puzzle box. Groups of UCLA students known as "Bruin Bear Security Force" also camp out in Bruin Plaza, ostensibly to protect the Bruin Bear in the event of a prank, while the USC Trojan Knights hold a week-long vigil guarding Tommy Trojan with the sign "Don't Bruin your life". This has come as a response to students painting the statues in the rival schools' colors before the game.

There are a number of inter-campus competitions between various groups before the game.

- ROTC "Blood Bowl" – The football rivalry extends to the military training units at both schools. The Naval and Army Officers Training Corps midshipmen and cadets at both universities compete in the annual "Blood Bowl" flag football game against each other, usually held the Friday before the official game, as a parallel to the varsity match. The name stems from the often rough and passionate play by the midshipmen and cadets representing school pride. After a 25–12 victory on December 3, 2010, by the Army Battalion, UCLA continues to lead the series all time versus USC 15–11. As for Navy ROTC, the USC Trojan Battalion has soundly defeated the UCLA Bruin Battalion three times over the past four years, with no game played in 2020.
- Daily Bruin vs. Daily Trojan "Blood Bowl" – Staff of the Daily Bruin and Daily Trojan have competed in a flag football contest that is also called the "Blood Bowl". This tradition has existed since at least 1950.
- The Band Bowl – From the 1950s until 2000 the UCLA Marching Band and the USC Marching Band played in a flag football contest called the "Band Bowl". While parked on the USC campus for the 2000 game, UCLA band's equipment truck was broken into with many instruments and gear being stolen. The incident ended the Band Bowl between the two schools.
- UCLA vs. USC Football Manager's Bowl – UCLA and USC football equipment managers compete in a flag football contest the week leading up to the actual football game. The series was suspended in 2007 after several participants required hospital emergency-room treatment in 2006 because of injuries In 2011, the UCLA managers beat the USC managers in triple overtime. The UCLA managers have won the previous 4 match-ups.
- UCLA vs. USC Kickoff Golf Challenge – UCLA teams compete against USC teams in a two-person best ball scramble.
- UCLA vs. USC Men's Ice Hockey – UCLA and USC have teams that compete in ACHA Division II club-level Ice hockey. They begin their series for the Crosstown cup.
- UCLA vs. USC Men's Rugby – UCLA and USC compete every year on the day after the football game. UCLA has won every matchup since 2004 with an overall record of 45–6.
- We Run the City 5K – A 5 km rivalry run held the Sunday before the football game that benefits Special Olympics Southern California. Runners pledge their allegiance to their team upon registration. Registration is open to all fans, students, alumni, staff, and the community. This is a family friendly run/walk managed by Special Olympics Southern California with USC and UCLA serve as the title sponsors since its inception in 2012.

=== Activities during the game ===
Starting with the 2008 season, the winners of a blood drive competition were announced during halftime, with the winners donating more blood to the American Red Cross. UCLA won in 2008, 2009, 2010 and 2011.

On November 13, 2012, UCLA served notice to the USC Marching Band that its drum major would not be allowed to stab a sword into the Bruins logo before the game in the Rose Bowl on November 17, 2012.

=== Sharing the Los Angeles Coliseum ===
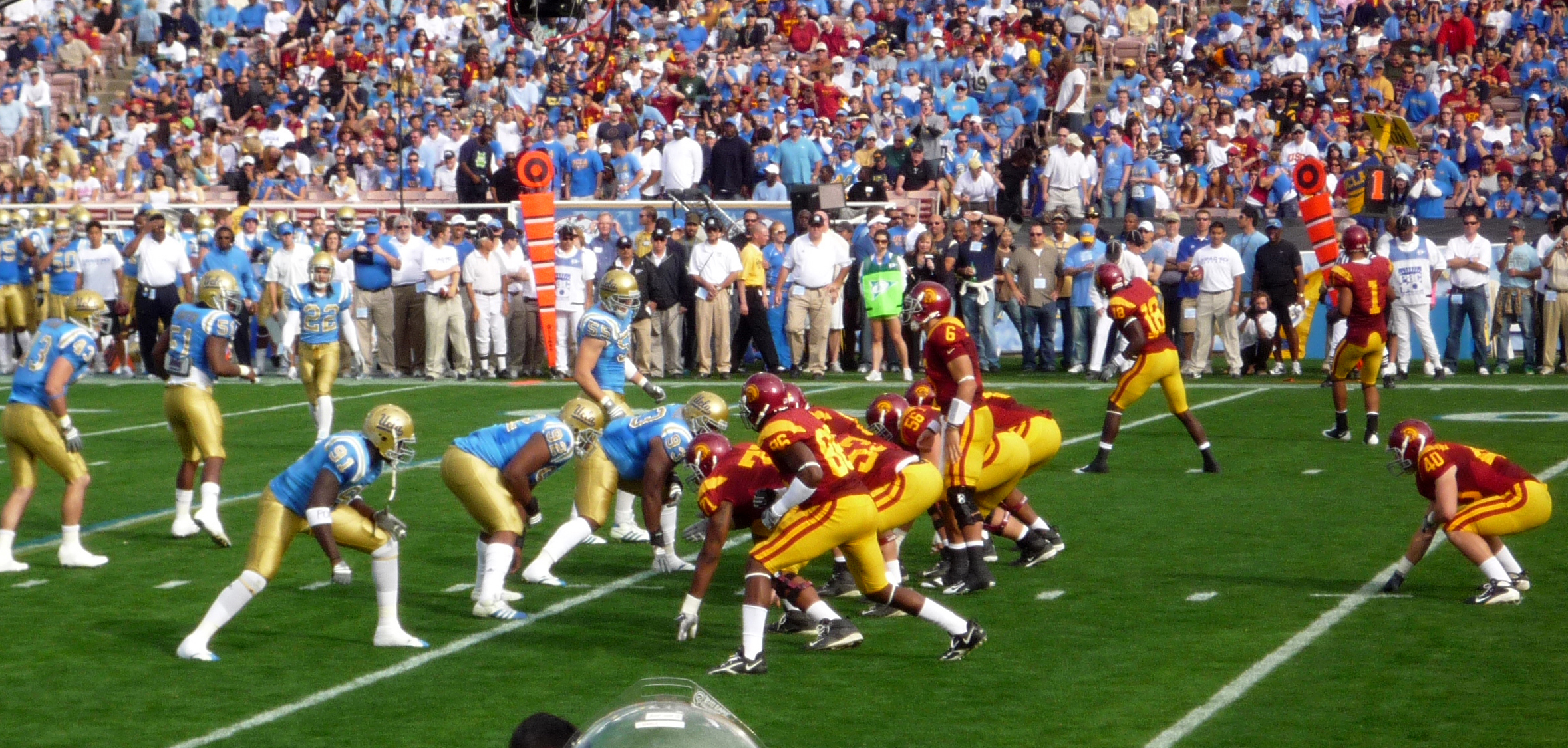
The 2008 game marked a return to both teams wearing their color jerseys; a tradition born out of the two schools sharing the Los Angeles Coliseum from 1929 to 1981.

For a number of years, the schools shared the Los Angeles Memorial Coliseum as their home stadium, until UCLA moved to the Rose Bowl for the 1982 season. Each school alternated as the designated home team for the game, with home fans on the north side of the Coliseum and visiting fans on the south (press box) side. Beginning in the 1984 season, when the game was played at the Rose Bowl for the second time, the visiting fans moved to the end-zone visitor sections of each respective stadium.

Players on both teams wore their home football jerseys for the game until 1982. An NCAA rule change for the 1983 season required the visiting team specifically to wear white jerseys, to provide more contrast for black-and-white photography and television broadcasts.

Before the 2008 season, the coaches at the time, USC coach Pete Carroll and UCLA coach Karl Dorrell, expressed an interest in restarting the tradition of both teams wearing primary colored home jerseys. At the time, the NCAA football rules Article 3. a. stated, "Players of opposing teams shall wear jerseys of contrasting colors, and the visiting team shall wear white jerseys." USC coach Pete Carroll said he would be willing to lose two timeouts during the game so that the USC team could wear their cardinal jerseys for the UCLA–USC football game on December 6, 2008. It was determined before the 2008 game that the visiting school would only lose one timeout for incorrect equipment. Carroll agreed to forfeit a timeout to satisfy the ruling and Coach Rick Neuheisel agreed to forfeit one in return, even though, as the coach of the home team, he was not required to do so by the NCAA rules.

In the wake of the coaches' decisions, the NCAA decided to amend their rules regarding away teams' uniforms for the 2009 seasn, stating that the teams must agree on the decision for both teams to wear their colored jerseys before the game and that the uniforms must be of easily contrasted colors. Since the home team is already required to wear its colored home jerseys and would not be in violation of any equipment rules, this essentially leaves the decision up to them as to whether or not to allow the visiting team is to wear their home uniforms.

Because UCLA called the Coliseum home and USC won a number of Rose Bowl games, each school has a lifetime winning record in the others' current home stadium.

=== Victory Bell ===
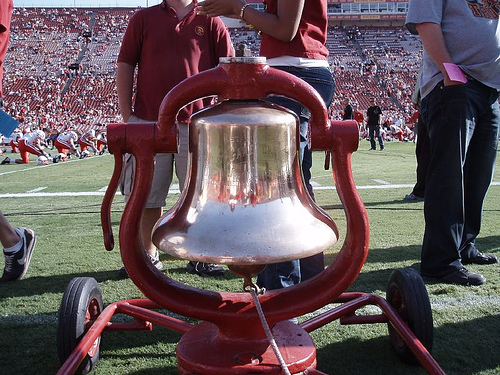
The Trojan Knights watching over the Victory Bell during a USC home game.

When the football teams from these schools compete against each other, the victor is awarded the Victory Bell. The Victory Bell was originally from an old Southern Pacific railroad locomotive. It was given to the UCLA student body by the UCLA Alumni Association in 1939.

It was UCLA's symbol of victory until it was stolen by a USC organization called the Trojan Knights in 1941. After being hidden in various locations for over a year before resurfacing in a USC student magazine (known as the Wampus), a prank war between the two universities ensued until 1942, when the student body presidents of the two schools agreed that the bell would be the trophy awarded the winner of the annual UCLA–USC football game.

The bell itself is brass, and the metal mounting around it is painted blue or cardinal by the school that won the football game and earned its possession. When UCLA possesses it, the UCLA Rally Committee is responsible for its protection and care. While it is in USC's possession, the Trojan Knights are responsible for hiding, protecting, and showcasing the bell (including ringing the bell during home football games). USC currently has the Victory Bell after its 29-10 victory on November 29, 2025.

With the Rose Bowl stadium being the home field for UCLA, the UCLA–USC rivalry football game has been played there during even numbered years since 1982.

Following expansion and the division of the conference into two football divisions, with UCLA and USC both in the South Division, the division title and a berth in the Pac-12 Championship Game have been on the line for at least one team twice. Both teams have either won the championship or spoiled it for the other at one time or another.

=== Bowl games ===
Until the Rose Bowl Game became part of the Bowl Championship Series (BCS) and later the College Football Playoff (CFP), a berth in the Rose Bowl to face the Big Ten Conference champion was the ultimate goal that was awarded to the then-Pacific-10 conference champion. Through the 2016 season, USC has appeared in the Rose Bowl 34 times and UCLA has appeared 12 times.

During the BCS era (1998–2013), the Rose Bowl was the destination for the first-place Big Ten and Pac-12 teams, should either fail to qualify for the BCS championship game. Since the establishment of the CFP in 2014, the Rose Bowl is one of six bowls that rotates as host of a CFP semifinal game. In years in which the Rose Bowl does not host a CFP semifinal, the Rose Bowl Game is assured of hosting the first-place teams from the two conferences should they fail to be selected for the CFP semifinals.

UCLA was the first Pac-10 team to appear in a BCS bowl, the 1999 Rose Bowl, their last conference championship year. USC has appeared in six BCS bowl games, winning the BCS championship in 2005.

Before the Pac-10 expanded in 2011 and became the Pac-12, the Rose Bowl and conference championship were on the line for both teams 20 times and at least one team 37 times.

=== Football series record ===
As of the end of the 2025 college football season, USC leads 53–34–7 (record excludes two vacated USC wins due to NCAA penalty for violation of NCAA rules). There has been one overtime game in the series in 1996. Many of the games of this rivalry have ultimately determined the Pac-10 Rose Bowl representative and often a chance for USC to play for the national championship. USC was forced to vacate both its wins from the 2004 and 2005 seasons due to NCAA violations.

UCLA victories	USC victories	Ties	Forfeits / Vacated wins

No.	Date	Location	Winner	Score
1	September 28, 1929	USC	USC	76–0
2	September 27, 1930	UCLA	USC	52–0
3	November 26, 1936	USC	Tie	7–7
4	December 4, 1937	USC	USC	19–13
5	November 24, 1938	USC	#14 USC	42–7
6	December 9, 1939	UCLA	Tie	0–0
7	November 30, 1940	USC	USC	28–12
8	December 6, 1941	UCLA	Tie	7–7
9	December 12, 1942	USC	#13 UCLA	17–14
10	September 23, 1943	UCLA	USC	20–0
11	November 27, 1943	USC	USC	26–13
12	September 23, 1944	USC	Tie	13–13
13	November 25, 1944	UCLA	#8 USC	40–13
14	September 21, 1945	UCLA	USC	13–6
15	December 1, 1945	USC	USC	26–15
16	November 23, 1946	UCLA	#4 UCLA	16–13
17	November 22, 1947	USC	#4 USC	6–0
18	November 20, 1948	UCLA	USC	20–13
19	November 19, 1949	USC	USC	21–7
20	November 25, 1950	UCLA	UCLA	39–0
21	November 24, 1951	USC	#18 UCLA	21–7
22	November 22, 1952	UCLA	#4 USC	14–12
23	November 21, 1953	USC	#5 UCLA	13–0
24	November 20, 1954	UCLA	#2 UCLA	34–0
25	November 19, 1955	USC	#5 UCLA	17–7
26	November 25, 1956	UCLA	USC	10–7
27	November 23, 1957	USC	UCLA	20–9
28	November 22, 1958	UCLA	Tie	15–15
29	November 21, 1959	USC	UCLA	10–3
30	November 26, 1960	UCLA	USC	17–6
31	November 25, 1961	USC	UCLA	10–7
32	November 24, 1962	UCLA	#1 USC	14–3
33	November 30, 1963	USC	USC	26–6
34	November 21, 1964	UCLA	USC	34–13
35	November 20, 1965	USC	#7 UCLA	20–16
36	November 19, 1966	UCLA	#8 UCLA	14–7
37	November 18, 1967	USC	#8 USC	21–20
38	November 23, 1968	UCLA	#1 USC	28–16
39	November 22, 1969	USC	#5 USC	14–12
40	November 21, 1970	UCLA	UCLA	45–20
41	November 20, 1971	USC	Tie	7–7
42	November 18, 1972	UCLA	#1 USC	24–7
43	November 24, 1973	USC	#9 USC	23–13
44	November 23, 1974	UCLA	#8 USC	34–9
45	November 28, 1975	USC	#14 UCLA	25–22
46	November 20, 1976	UCLA	#13 USC	24–14
47	November 25, 1977	USC	USC	29–27
48	November 18, 1978	UCLA	#5 USC	17–10
49	November 24, 1979	USC	#4 USC	49–14

No.	Date	Location	Winner	Score
50	November 22, 1980	UCLA	#18 UCLA	20–17
51	November 21, 1981	USC	#10 USC	22–21
52	November 20, 1982	Rose Bowl	#11 UCLA	20–19
53	November 19, 1983	Coliseum	UCLA	27–17
54	November 17, 1984	Rose Bowl	#7 UCLA	29–10
55	November 23, 1985	Coliseum	USC	17–13
56	November 22, 1986	Rose Bowl	#18 UCLA	45–25
57	November 21, 1987	Coliseum	USC	17–13
58	November 19, 1988	Rose Bowl	#2 USC	31–22
59	November 18, 1989	Coliseum	Tie	10–10
60	November 17, 1990	Rose Bowl	#19 USC	45–42
61	November 23, 1991	Coliseum	#25 UCLA	24–21
62	November 21, 1992	Rose Bowl	UCLA	38–37
63	November 20, 1993	Coliseum	#16 UCLA	27–21
64	November 19, 1994	Rose Bowl	UCLA	31–19
65	November 18, 1995	Coliseum	UCLA	24–20
66	November 23, 1996	Rose Bowl	UCLA	48–41^{(2 OT)}
67	November 22, 1997	Coliseum	#7 UCLA	31–24
68	November 21, 1998	Rose Bowl	#3 UCLA	34–17
69	November 20, 1999	Coliseum	USC	17–7
70	November 18, 2000	Rose Bowl	USC	38–35
71	November 17, 2001	Coliseum	USC	27–0
72	November 23, 2002	Rose Bowl	#7 USC	52–21
73	November 22, 2003	Coliseum	#2 USC	47–22
74	December 4, 2004	Rose Bowl	None	29–24
75	December 3, 2005	Coliseum	None	66–19
76	December 2, 2006	Rose Bowl	UCLA	13–9
77	December 1, 2007	Coliseum	#8 USC	24–7
78	December 6, 2008	Rose Bowl	#5 USC	28–7
79	November 28, 2009	Coliseum	#24 USC	28–7
80	December 4, 2010	Rose Bowl	USC	28–14
81	November 26, 2011	Coliseum	#10 USC	50–0
82	November 17, 2012	Rose Bowl	#17 UCLA	38–28
83	November 30, 2013	Coliseum	#22 UCLA	35–14
84	November 22, 2014	Rose Bowl	#11 UCLA	38–20
85	November 28, 2015	Coliseum	USC	40–21
86	November 19, 2016	Rose Bowl	#13 USC	36–14
87	November 18, 2017	Coliseum	#11 USC	28–23
88	November 17, 2018	Rose Bowl	UCLA	34–27
89	November 23, 2019	Coliseum	#23 USC	52–35
90	December 12, 2020	Rose Bowl	#15 USC	43–38
91	November 20, 2021	Coliseum	UCLA	62–33
92	November 19, 2022	Rose Bowl	#7 USC	48–45
93	November 18, 2023	Coliseum	UCLA	38–20
94	November 23, 2024	Rose Bowl	USC	19–13
95	November 29, 2025	Coliseum	#19 USC	29–10
Series: USC leads 52–34–7
† USC was forced to vacate victories. Ties have previous winner retaining trophy.

=== Winning streaks in the series ===
UCLA holds the longest winning streak in the series, as UCLA won eight straight games from 1991 to 1998. USC's longest streak was for seven wins from 1999 to 2005, which is not recognized because multiple years have vacated wins. But because a vacated win (under the NCAA) still counts as a loss for the opponent, UCLA's longest losing streak is still the seven games from 1999 to 2005.

=== The 1967 "Game of the Century" ===
The 1967 USC vs. UCLA football game was one of the historically significant football games of the 20th century. It matched No. 4 USC with O. J. Simpson against No. 1 UCLA with Gary Beban for the Conference Championship, National Championship, and Heisman Trophy on the line for Beban or Simpson. USC won 21–20 and went on to defeat Indiana in the Rose Bowl and win the national championship. Despite Simpson's sensational performance in this game and accumulating 1,543 rushing yards for the season, Beban won the Heisman Trophy. Simpson won the trophy the following year.

=== Other notable games ===
- In the 1929 season, UCLA would play football in the Pacific Coast Conference for the first time. USC had just come off an undefeated National Championship season under the legendary Howard Jones. In the opening game of the season, the USC "Thundering Herd" defeated UCLA 76–0, which stands as the most lopsided score of the series.
- 1939 season – This was the first year where the Rose Bowl was on the line for both teams, and the first time both teams were ranked. The game ended in a scoreless tie, and USC went to the 1940 Rose Bowl.
- 1952 season – UCLA was ranked No. 3 and USC was ranked No. 4. Both teams were undefeated and untied. USC would win on 14–12. USC would later go on to lose to Notre Dame but win the 1953 Rose Bowl.
- 1963 season – The game, scheduled for November 23, was postponed because of the assassination of John F. Kennedy, which occurred on Friday, November 22. It was played on November 30, with USC prevailing 26–6.
- 1965 season – #7 UCLA met #6 USC for the AAWU (Pac-8) title and the right to meet undefeated and #1 Michigan State in the 1966 Rose Bowl. The 1965 "Gutty Little Bruins" team won 20–16 with a score at 2:39 left to play, then upset the Spartans in the Rose Bowl Game.
- 1969 season – Undefeated #6 UCLA (8–0–1) met undefeated #5 USC (8–0–1) with the 1970 Rose Bowl on the line. USC would prevail with a score in the final two minutes to win 14–12.
- 1976 season – This was one of the biggest games of the 1976 season. Undefeated #2 UCLA (9–0–1) vs. #3 ranked USC (8–1) met to determine the 1977 Rose Bowl representative, and an outside shot at the National Championship should #1 ranked Pittsburgh lose. USC won 24–14 in the first rivalry game for both John Robinson and Terry Donahue.
- 1982 season – The first rivalry game in the Rose Bowl, and the last to feature both teams in home jerseys until the 2008 game, in the final play USC quarterback Scott Tinsley attempted a two point conversion, but UCLA's Karl Morgan sacked him before the throw to preserve the Bruins’ 20-19 win, and propel the Bruins to their first Rose Bowl in their new home stadium and the first Rose Bowl and conference championship for Terry Donahue. It was John Robinson's last game in his first stint with USC before leaving to coach the Los Angeles Rams.
- 1988 season – Undefeated second-ranked USC (9–0) and quarterback Rodney Peete met 9–1, sixth-ranked UCLA and quarterback Troy Aikman with the 1989 Rose Bowl on the line. UCLA had been ranked No. 1 before losing to Washington State. A possible Heisman trophy for Peete or Aikman was on the line. The attendance set a regular season Rose Bowl record of 100,741. Rodney Peete was stricken with measles the week before the game and had been to the hospital. But he managed to lead the Trojans over the Bruins 31–22. It would set up the classic #1 Notre Dame vs #2 USC matchup the following week. Peete and Aikman would finish 2nd and 3rd in the Heisman balloting behind Barry Sanders.
- 1993 season – #16 UCLA and #22 USC met at the Coliseum with the Rose Bowl on the line for both teams. UCLA, quarterbacked by Wayne Cook, jumped out to a 17–0 lead at halftime, only to see USC cut the deficit to 24–21 early in the 4th. After a Bjorn Merten field goal made it 27–21 UCLA, USC quarterback Rob Johnson completed consecutive long passes to Johnnie Morton and Ken Grace to move the ball to the UCLA 3-yard line with 1:16 to play. Two USC runs behind All-American tackle Tony Boselli were stopped, then on third down, Johnson's pass was intercepted in the end zone by Marvin Goodwin to seal the win for the Bruins. The result created a 3-way tie between UCLA, USC, and Arizona, and UCLA advanced to the 1994 Rose Bowl, its first Rose Bowl in 8 years, due to head-to-head wins over both other teams. UCLA broke a 10-game losing streak with the Rose Bowl on the line for both schools.
- 1996 season – UCLA erased a 17-point deficit in the final 7 minutes of the fourth quarter to tie the score, then blocked a potential game-winning USC field goal at the end of regulation to create the first (and as of 2023, only) overtime game in the rivalry's history. The Bruins went on win, 48–41, in double overtime, to extend their win streak to six games. Cade McNown becomes the only UCLA quarterback to defeat USC all four years of his college career.
- 1999 season – USC won 17–7 to break the Bruins' streak of eight straight.
- 2005 season – USC had been ranked No. 1 all season and faced a one-loss eleventh ranked UCLA (9–1) team as its last obstacle to the dream 2006 Rose Bowl BCS Championship matchup with #2 Texas. USC featured Heisman trophy winner Matt Leinart and eventual winner Reggie Bush. USC defeated UCLA 66–19 in one of the most lopsided games of the series since the first matchup in 1929. The win was later vacated for NCAA infractions.
- 2006 season – "13–9"; on December 2, 2006, UCLA defeated the Trojans, 13–9. In doing so, the Bruins not only ended No. 2-ranked USC's 63-game streak of scoring 20-plus points per game, but also eliminated the Trojans' from competing in their fourth-consecutive national title game (after winning the 2003 and 2004 AP National Championships and narrowly losing to Texas in the 2005 BCS National Championship game), which would have pitted the No. 2 Trojans against No. 1 ranked Ohio State in the 2006 BCS National Championship game. This was only the second USC loss to a major rival (UCLA or Notre Dame) in the Pete Carroll era.
- 2011 season – "50–0"; on November 26, 2011, USC routed UCLA 50–0, which is the largest margin of victory in the rivalry since the 1930 matchup. Quarterback Matt Barkley set the record for passing yards (423) and touchdowns (6) in the history of the rivalry, while wide receiver Marqise Lee set the record for receiving yards (224). The game marked USC's 12th victory in 13 years against UCLA.
- 2018 season – UCLA won 34–27 to end a three-game winning streak in the series by USC. Bruins running back Joshua Kelley carried the ball 40 times for a career-high 289 yards, the most rushing yards for a player on either team in the history of the rivalry. In their 88th meeting, it was the first time the schools entered with a combined 13 losses. The Rose Bowl crowd of 57,116 was the lowest in the series since 1950, when 51,906 attended a 39–0 Bruins win at the Coliseum.
- 2019 season – USC won 52–35 behind quarterback Kedon Slovis's school-record 515 passing yards, which was also the most in the rivalry's history. The Trojans established a school record with four receivers each catching for over 100 yards.
- 2020 season – Due to COVID-19 restrictions, the teams played in an empty Rose Bowl stadium where USC defeated UCLA 43-38.
- 2021 season – In a 62-33 win, UCLA tied records for the most points (62), most touchdowns (9) and most extra points (8) scored against any USC football team.

=== Rivalry glory years ===
Between 1965 and 1978, the conference championship and Rose Bowl berth were on the line for both teams nine times.

- 1965 #7 UCLA uses two late touchdowns sandwiched around an on-side kick to beat #6 USC, 20–16.
- 1966 #8 UCLA, playing without injured star QB Gary Beban, beats #7 USC, 14–7.
- 1967 #2 USC, led by O. J. Simpson's 64-yard TD run and three blocked kicks, beats #1 UCLA, 21–20.
- 1969 #5 USC, after a penalty on a 4th & 10 incompletion, scores a controversial late TD to beat #6 UCLA, 14–12.
- 1972 #1 USC pulls away in the 2nd half to beat No. 14 UCLA, 24–7. UCLA was led by quarterback Mark Harmon, future television and movie actor.
- 1973 #9 USC, taking advantage of numerous turnovers, beats #8 UCLA, 23–13.
- 1974 #8 USC wins easily over an injury riddled unranked UCLA squad, 34–9.
- 1976 #3 USC, behind the scrambling and passing of QB Vince Evans, beats #2 UCLA, 24–14.
- 1978 #5 USC runs out the last 6 1/2 minutes of the clock to hold off #14 UCLA, 17–10.

In two other years (1975 and 1977) between 1965 and 1978, the Rose Bowl berth was on the line for UCLA only.

- 1975 #14 UCLA overcomes 8 lost fumbles from 11 total (both Pac-12 records) and holds off unranked USC, 25–22 and goes on to upset #1 Ohio State in the Rose Bowl
- 1977 #17 UCLA loses on a last-second USC field goal, 29–27; thus, Washington goes to the Rose Bowl and upsets Michigan.

The USC coaches during this time were John McKay and John Robinson, while UCLA was coached by Tommy Prothro, Pepper Rodgers, Dick Vermeil, and Terry Donahue.

== Basketball ==
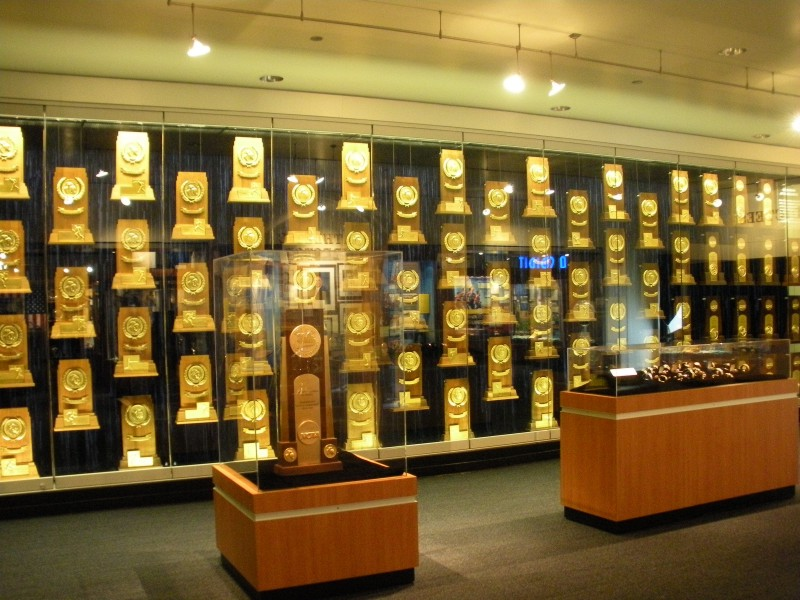
NCAA National Championship trophies, rings, watches

=== Men's ===
In the history of Pac-12 Conference men's basketball through 2024, UCLA has won or shared 32 conference championships and USC has won seven outright and shared two others. When John Wooden became the coach, UCLA turned into a national basketball powerhouse, and the Bruins have since become known as one of the blue bloods in college basketball. UCLA has won 11 NCAA Division I men's basketball tournaments and has dominated the conference, winning two games for every one that USC won.

==== Notable games ====
- The first official meeting between the two schools as they are now known took place in February 1928 after UCLA was invited to join the Pacific Coast Conference. UCLA won two of a three-game basketball series to inaugurate the basketball rivalry.
- The lowest scoring game in the series is from 1932, where USC went into a stall in the first half. UCLA won 19–17.
- USC had a 41-game winning streak against UCLA from 1932 to 1943, a national record that stood until UCLA eventually beat it in 1980 with a 42nd consecutive win against Cal, on the way to a 52-game winning streak, the current NCAA record of one opponent over another. UCLA Defeated USC 42–37 in the first of the two final home games in the 1943 season to break the streak. This is still the third-longest streak of one Division 1 opponent against another.
- A three-game series in March 1951 was the first time both teams were nationally ranked, with UCLA at 17 and USC at 18 in the AP poll. A USC player, Ken Flower, was offered a bribe to throw the game. Flower immediately told USC assistant coach Al Conti and eventually the police were contacted.
- In the 1960–1961 season, USC and UCLA met for the third time on March 3, 1961, in the game that would ultimately decide the AAWU champion and 2nd place. The teams had split the two previous games. USC beat UCLA 86–85 in overtime, and later advanced to the NCAA tournament.
- In the 1968–1969 season, USC took UCLA, led by Lew Alcindor, to two overtimes before losing 61–55 at the Los Angeles Sports Arena. In the second game, one night later on March 8, 1969, USC would finally defeat UCLA 46–44, marking the Bruins' first loss in Pauley Pavilion. This was also one of only two losses Lew (later Kareem Abdul-Jabbar) would experience in his college career. The "stall", which USC coach Bob Boyd used against UCLA in 1967 for USC., finally worked in 1969.
- In the 1970–1971 basketball season, UCLA and USC were ranked No. 1 and #2 for much of the season. #2 ranked USC coached by Bob Boyd suffered its first loss against #3 ranked UCLA, blowing a 9-point second half lead. In the rematch in the final game of the season, UCLA jumped out to a big early lead and went on to win 72–63. USC would finish the season 24–2 and ranked No. 2, but only the conference champion, UCLA, could be invited to the 1971 NCAA University Division basketball tournament, as there were no at-large slots in the bracket. This would be one of the cases for expanding the bracket to 32 teams for the 1975 NCAA Division I basketball tournament.
- In the 1973–1974 basketball season, the two teams were tied for first in the Pac-8 going into the last game of the season. With the conference championship and berth in the 1974 NCAA Division I basketball tournament on the line, Bill Walton led UCLA to a lopsided victory. Notably, UCLA would be the national semi-finalist in the NCAA tournament, while USC would be the semi-finalist in the Collegiate Coaches' Association Tournament, a tournament that invited second-place conference teams.
- In the 1984–1985 season, UCLA and USC would meet for the game that would decide first place in the Pacific-10. USC already had beat UCLA 78–77 in double overtime at the Los Angeles Memorial Sports Arena. The second game at Pauley Pavilion on February 28, 1985, was finally decided in quadruple overtime with USC winning 80–78. USC would be invited to the 1985 NCAA Division I men's basketball tournament, while UCLA was invited to and won the National Invitation Tournament.
- In the 2007–2008 season, UCLA and USC met in the 2008 Pacific-10 Conference men's basketball tournament, for the first time in 225 games, in post-season play. The teams had split in the regular season with the Trojans winning at Pauley Pavilion and the Bruins winning at Galen Center. In their third game, a capacity crowd of 18,997 at the Staples Center saw UCLA beat USC 57–54 in the semi-finals. Both teams had highly regarded freshmen: Kevin Love and O. J. Mayo. USC later had to vacate the regular season win when it was found that Mayo had accepted gifts from agents while still in high school, which made him ineligible for NCAA play.

==== Men's Basketball series record ====
UCLA victories	USC victories	Ties	Forfeits / Vacated wins

No.	Date	Location	Winner	Score
1	1928	UCLA	USC	45–35
2	1928	USC	UCLA	34–27
3	1928	USC	UCLA	47–37
4	1929	USC	USC	28–23
5	1929	USC	USC	39–31
6	1929	USC	UCLA	44–33
7	1930	UCLA	USC	33–16
8	1930	UCLA	USC	42–30
9	1930	UCLA	USC	33–28
10	1931	UCLA	UCLA	25–16
11	1931	UCLA	USC	24–22
12	1931	UCLA	UCLA	46–23
13	1932	UCLA	UCLA	19–17
14	1932	USC	UCLA	26–24
15	1932	USC	USC	35–31
16	1933	USC	USC	49–27
17	1933	USC	USC	39–33
18	1933	UCLA	USC	44–18
19	1934	UCLA	USC	39–26
20	1934	UCLA	USC	39–22
21	1934	UCLA	USC	46–21
22	1934	UCLA	USC	32–23
23	1935	UCLA	USC	39–34
24	1935	UCLA	USC	52–22
25	1935	UCLA	USC	55–22
26	1935	UCLA	USC	43–33
27	1936	USC	USC	38–36
28	1936	UCLA	USC	32–24
29	1936	UCLA	USC	36–32
30	1936	USC	USC	55–28
31	1937	UCLA	USC	41–31
32	1937	UCLA	USC	36–31
33	1937	UCLA	USC	46–36
34	1937	UCLA	USC	43–29
35	1938	USC	USC	48–31
36	1938	UCLA	USC	40–30
37	1938	UCLA	USC	52–33
38	1938	USC	USC	57–35
39	1939	UCLA	USC	69–36
40	1939	UCLA	USC	59–49
41	1939	UCLA	USC	43–35
42	1939	UCLA	USC	57–26
43	1940	USC	USC	50–32
44	1940	USC	USC	60–26
45	1940	UCLA	USC	32–26
46	1940	UCLA	USC	47–35
47	1941	UCLA	USC	56–35
48	1941	UCLA	USC	43–41
49	1941	USC	USC	53–47
50	1941	USC	USC	52–37
51	1942	UCLA	USC	59–51
52	1942	USC	USC	42–30
53	1942	UCLA	USC	63–44
54	1942	UCLA	USC	49–35
55	1943	USC	USC	60–49
56	1943	USC	USC	51–39
57	1943	UCLA	UCLA	42–37
58	1943	UCLA	USC	53–46
59	1944	UCLA	UCLA	33–19
60	1944	USC	USC	48–41
61	1944	USC	UCLA	32–30
62	1944	UCLA	UCLA	40–32
63	1945	USC	USC	53–25
64	1945	UCLA	UCLA	41–36
65	1945	UCLA	UCLA	34–28
66	1945	USC	USC	37–20
67	1946	USC	USC	43–33
68	1946	UCLA	USC	45–40
69	1946	USC	UCLA	45–35
70	1946	UCLA	USC	60–43
71	1947	USC	UCLA	60–46
72	1947	UCLA	UCLA	61–46
73	1947	USC	UCLA	71–66
74	1947	UCLA	UCLA	66–54
75	1948	UCLA	USC	56–42
76	1948	USC	UCLA	51–50
77	1948	UCLA	USC	68–57
78	1948	USC	USC	62–46
79	1949	UCLA	UCLA	74–68
80	1949	USC	USC	59–52
81	1949	USC	UCLA	51–50
82	1949	UCLA	UCLA	63–55
83	1950	USC	USC	58–45
84	1950	UCLA	#10 UCLA	68–47
85	1950	UCLA	USC	45–43
86	1950	USC	#6 UCLA	74–57
87	1951	USC	#19 USC	53–34
88	1951	USC	UCLA	57–44
89	1951	UCLA	#17 UCLA	59–53
90	1951	UCLA	#18 USC	43–41

No.	Date	Location	Winner	Score
91	1951	UCLA	#17 UCLA	49–41
92	1952	USC	UCLA	55–48
93	1952	USC	UCLA	67–58
94	1952	UCLA	UCLA	66–51
95	1952	UCLA	UCLA	63–57
96	1953	UCLA	#12 USC	65–54
97	1953	UCLA	UCLA	72–62
98	1953	USC	USC	66–65
99	1953	USC	USC	76–64
100	1954	USC	USC	68–65
101	1954	USC	UCLA	81–63
102	1954	UCLA	USC	79–68
103	1954	UCLA	USC	69–67
104	1955	UCLA	#10 UCLA	70–67
105	1955	UCLA	#10 UCLA	74–64
106	1955	USC	#9 UCLA	66–65
107	1955	USC	#9 UCLA	75–55
108	1956	USC	#10 UCLA	85–70
109	1956	USC	#10 UCLA	97–84
110	1957	UCLA	USC	84–80
111	1957	UCLA	#7 UCLA	65–55
112	1958	UCLA	UCLA	64–56
113	1958	UCLA	UCLA	52–51
114	1959	UCLA	UCLA	57–53
115	1959	UCLA	UCLA	65–63
116	1959	UCLA	UCLA	47–45
117	1959	UCLA	USC	72–62
118	1960	UCLA	#10 UCLA	63–62
119	1960	UCLA	USC	91–71
120	1960	UCLA	UCLA	72–70
121	1961	UCLA	#9 USC	78–63
122	1961	UCLA	UCLA	86–83
123	1961	UCLA	#10 USC	86–85
124	1962	UCLA	UCLA	73–59
125	1962	UCLA	USC	74–60
126	1962	UCLA	UCLA	69–62
127	1963	UCLA	UCLA	77–65
128	1963	UCLA	UCLA	86–72
129	1963	UCLA	USC	62–60
130	1964	UCLA	#1 UCLA	79–59
131	1964	UCLA	#1 UCLA	78–71
132	1964	UCLA	#1 UCLA	91–81
133	1964	USC	#4 UCLA	84–75
134	1965	UCLA	#2 UCLA	77–71
135	1965	UCLA	#2 UCLA	52–50
136	1965	USC	UCLA	86–67
137	1965	USC	UCLA	94–76
138	1966	UCLA	UCLA	94–79
139	1966	USC	UCLA	99–62
140	1966	UCLA	#1 UCLA	105–90
141	1966	UCLA	#1 UCLA	107–83
142	1967	USC	#1 UCLA	40–35^{OT}
143	1967	UCLA	#1 UCLA	83–55
144	1968	UCLA	#2 UCLA	101–67
145	1968	USC	#2 UCLA	72–64
146	1969	USC	#1 UCLA	61–55^{2OT}
147	1969	UCLA	USC	46–44
148	1970	UCLA	USC	87–86
149	1970	USC	#1 UCLA	91–78
150	1971	USC	#3 UCLA	64–60
151	1971	UCLA	#1 UCLA	73–62
152	1972	UCLA	#1 UCLA	81–56
153	1972	USC	#1 UCLA	79–66
154	1973	USC	#1 UCLA	79–56
155	1973	UCLA	#1 UCLA	76–56
156	1974	UCLA	#1 UCLA	65–54
157	1974	USC	#3 UCLA	82–52
158	1975	UCLA	#4 UCLA	89–84
159	1975	USC	#4 UCLA	72–68
160	1976	UCLA	#12 UCLA	68–62
161	1976	USC	#7 UCLA	87–73
162	1977	UCLA	#8 UCLA	77–59
163	1977	USC	#4 UCLA	78–69
164	1978	UCLA	#6 UCLA	83–71
165	1978	USC	#2 UCLA	91–78
166	1979	UCLA	#6 UCLA	89–86
167	1979	USC	#4 UCLA	102–94^{OT}
168	1980	USC	USC	82–74
169	1980	UCLA	UCLA	91–64
170	1981	UCLA	USC	68–66
171	1981	USC	#12 UCLA	76–62
172	1982	USC	USC	86–71
173	1982	UCLA	UCLA	69–66
174	1983	UCLA	#8 UCLA	77–60
175	1983	USC	#8 UCLA	71–64
176	1984	UCLA	#15 UCLA	75–69^{OT}
177	1984	USC	USC	80–72
178	1985	USC	USC	78–77^{2OT}
179	1985	UCLA	USC	80–78^{4OT}
180	1986	UCLA	UCLA	66–56

No.	Date	Location	Winner	Score
181	1986	USC	USC	79–64
182	1987	USC	UCLA	77–65
183	1987	UCLA	UCLA	82–76
184	1988	UCLA	UCLA	81–65
185	1988	USC	UCLA	85–70
186	1989	USC	UCLA	67–66
187	1989	UCLA	UCLA	68–65
188	1990	UCLA	#15 UCLA	89–72
189	1990	USC	USC	76–75
190	1991	UCLA	#10 UCLA	98–81
191	1991	USC	USC	76–74
192	1992	UCLA	#25 USC	86–82
193	1992	USC	#13 USC	83–79
194	1993	USC	UCLA	90–80
195	1993	UCLA	USC	72–62
196	1994	UCLA	#4 UCLA	101–72
197	1994	USC	USC	85–79
198	1995	USC	#7 UCLA	73–69
199	1995	UCLA	#1 UCLA	85–66
200	1996	UCLA	#15 UCLA	99–72
201	1996	USC	#16 UCLA	61–59
202	1997	USC	UCLA	96–87
203	1997	UCLA	#17 UCLA	82–60
204	1998	UCLA	#9 UCLA	101–84
205	1998	USC	#12 UCLA	82–75^{OT}
206	1999	USC	#13 UCLA	98–80
207	1999	UCLA	#16 UCLA	68–63
208	2000	USC	USC	91–79
209	2000	UCLA	UCLA	83–78
210	2001	UCLA	UCLA	80–75
211	2001	USC	UCLA	85–75
212	2002	USC	USC	81–77
213	2002	UCLA	#15 UCLA	67–65
214	2003	UCLA	USC	80–75
215	2003	USC	USC	86–85
216	2004	UCLA	USC	76–69
217	2004	USC	USC	78–77^{OT}
218	2005	USC	UCLA	72–69
219	2005	UCLA	UCLA	90–69
220	2006	UCLA	#18 UCLA	66–45
221	2006	USC	USC	71–68
222	2007	USC	#4 UCLA	65–64
223	2007	UCLA	#2 UCLA	70–65
224	2008	UCLA	None	72–63†
225	2008	USC	#6 UCLA	54–46
226	2008	Staples Center	#3 UCLA	57–54
227	2009	USC	#10 UCLA	64–60
228	2009	UCLA	#10 UCLA	76–60
229	2009	Staples Center	USC	65–55
230	2010	UCLA	USC	67–46
231	2010	USC	USC	68–64
232	2011	USC	USC	63–52
233	2011	UCLA	UCLA	64–50
234	2012	USC	UCLA	66–47
235	2012	UCLA	UCLA	64–54
236	2012	Staples Center	UCLA	55–40
237	2013	UCLA	USC	75–71^{OT}
238	2013	USC	UCLA	75–59
239	2014	UCLA	UCLA	107–73
240	2014	USC	UCLA	83–73
241	2015	USC	UCLA	83–66
242	2015	UCLA	UCLA	85–74
243	2015	Las Vegas, NV	UCLA	96–70
244	2016	UCLA	USC	89–75
245	2016	USC	USC	80–61
246	2016	Las Vegas, NV	USC	95–71
247	2017	USC	USC	84–76
248	2017	UCLA	#6 UCLA	102–70
249	2017	Las Vegas, NV	#3 UCLA	76–74
250	2018	UCLA	UCLA	82–79
251	2018	USC	UCLA	83–72
252	2019	USC	USC	80–67
253	2019	UCLA	UCLA	93–88^{OT}
254	2020	UCLA	USC	74–63
255	2020	USC	USC	54–52
256	2021	USC	USC	66–48
257	2021	UCLA	USC	64–63
258	2022	USC	#21 USC	67–64
259	2022	UCLA	#17 UCLA	75–68
260	2022	Las Vegas, NV	#13 UCLA	69–59
261	2023	UCLA	#10 UCLA	60–58
262	2023	USC	USC	77–64
263	2024	USC	UCLA	65–50
264	2024	UCLA	USC	62–56
265	2025	USC	UCLA	82–76
266	2025	UCLA	UCLA	90–63
267	2026	UCLA	UCLA	81–62
268	2026	USC	UCLA	89–65
Series: UCLA leads 151–116
† USC was forced to vacate victories.

Score sources:

=== Women's ===
In women's basketball, UCLA has one AIAW championship and one NCAA championship. USC has two NCAA championships. USC won its second title in 1984 at UCLA's Pauley Pavilion.

==== Notable games ====
- The Bruins and Trojans faced each other twice in the second round of the AIAW championships, with UCLA winning in 1979 and USC winning in 1981.
- The USC Trojans were two-time defending national champions in the 1984–85 season. They featured star player Cheryl Miller, sister of UCLA player Reggie Miller. UCLA star athlete Jackie Joyner was a key to stopping Miller and the Trojans in both games between the two schools, breaking a USC seven-game winning streak over UCLA.
- The 2024–25 season was the first for UCLA and USC in the Big Ten Conference. The Bruins were undefeated and carried a #1 ranking in the polls – the program's first top ranking it its history – for twelve consecutive weeks before meeting the #6 ranked Trojans at the Galen Center on February 13, 2025. USC defeated UCLA 71–60 for the Trojans' very first defeat of a #1 team at home. In the re-match at Pauley Pavilion on March 1, with the #4 Trojans and #2 Bruins tied for first place in the Big Ten heading into the final regular season finale, USC again defeated UCLA 80–67 to win the regular season Big Ten Championship. The teams met a third time in the 2025 Big Ten women's basketball tournament championship game on March 9 in Indianapolis, where the #4 ranked UCLA Bruins defeated the #2 ranked USC Trojans 72–67 to win the Big Ten Tournament championship. Both the Bruins and Trojans would be number 1 seeds in the 2025 NCAA Division I women's basketball tournament, with UCLA as the number 1 seed overall and USC the fourth number 1 seed.
- In 2025–26, USC was without their star JuJu Watkins, as she was recovering from an ACL injury that she had suffered during the previous year's NCAA women's basketball tournament. UCLA meanwhile had lost Londynn Jones, Janiah Barker, and their entire 2024–25 freshman class to the transfer portal following their Final Four loss to UConn, however they added Utah transfer Gianna Kneepkens in the portal. After USC's regular season sweep the year prior, UCLA returned the favor in 2025–26, winning both games 80–46 and 73–50 respectively. UCLA's second victory over USC in the final game of the regular season allowed them to finish with an 18–0 record in Big Ten play and become the first Big Ten team to go undefeated in conference play since Maryland in 2014–15. UCLA went on to win its first national championship at the end of the year.

== Other notable sports rivalries ==
Because of the geographical proximity and conference affiliation, UCLA and USC compete in other NCAA-sanctioned sports, such as Basketball, Track and Field, Volleyball, and Water Polo. UCLA and USC have been at or near the top of the list of NCAA schools with the most NCAA Division I championships. They have faced each other for the national title in several sports including men's volleyball and women's water polo. Although basketball and football tend to get the most attention, the rivalry between the two schools is intense in every sport.

=== Baseball ===
The athletic rivalry began in 1920 when the University of California, Southern Branch Cubs defeated USC in spring baseball 7–6. USC has gone on to be the premier team in college baseball with 21 appearances in the College World Series and 12 titles, the most of any school and double the next closest school, Texas, who has six titles in 34 appearances. UCLA has appeared in the College World Series five times. UCLA won its first NCAA Baseball title in 2013.

As of the start of the 2021 season, USC leads UCLA in the series 263-144. Since 2010, UCLA and USC have met in the second game of a college baseball doubleheader at Dodger Stadium called the Dodgertown classic as well as a three-game conference series.

=== Fencing ===
Both the USC Fencing Club and UCLA fencing club are in the Intercollegeiate Fencing Conference of Southern California (IFCSC). They compete against NCAA fencing teams as well, such as UCSD, Caltech, and ASU.

=== Soccer ===
UCLA women's soccer team has dominated the Women of Troy, 22–5–1. But at the 2007 NCAA College Cup, USC won in the semi-finals, ending UCLA's 8 straight victories over the Trojans. USC went on to be the first Pac-10 (as it was called at the time) school to win the NCAA Women's Soccer Championship. In the 2008 regular season game, a pair of goals by Kristina Larsen gave UCLA a 2–1 win over USC in the Los Angeles Coliseum before a record crowd of 7,804 fans.

To advance to the NCAA Championship quarterfinals, the Bruins defeated the Women of Troy (1–0) in the round of 16 on Saturday, November 22, 2008, at Drake Stadium. It was also a battle between UCLA's Lauren Cheney and Kara Lang and USC's Amy Rodriguez, all of whom participated in the Beijing Olympic Games—Cheney and Rodriguez for the USA and Lang for Canada. Cheney and Rodriguez would win gold medals with Team USA, defeating Lang's Canada team in the quarterfinals. UCLA won the NCAA Division I Women's Soccer Championship in 2013, defeating Florida State 1–0 in overtime.

In 2016, UCLA bested USC 1–0 in the regular season finale. This motivated USC team to knock off 6 straight teams including top ranked West Virginia 3–1 in the finals to win their second NCAA National Title.

=== Tennis ===
USC and UCLA are two of the three winningest Men's tennis programs. As of the 2014 season, USC has won 21 NCAA Men's Tennis Championships and UCLA has won 16. This is the most, and third most, with Stanford being the second most with 17 championships. USC won five of up to 2014 (2009–2012, 2014), while UCLA's most recent Championship was in 2005. There was a run from 1960 to 1971 where either UCLA or USC was the champion. In twelve of the tournaments, one team has been runner-up to the other who won the championship, with an even split of six championships for both UCLA and USC.

UCLA has won two NCAA Division I Women's Tennis Championships, most recently in 2014. USC won in 1983 and 1985.

=== Volleyball ===
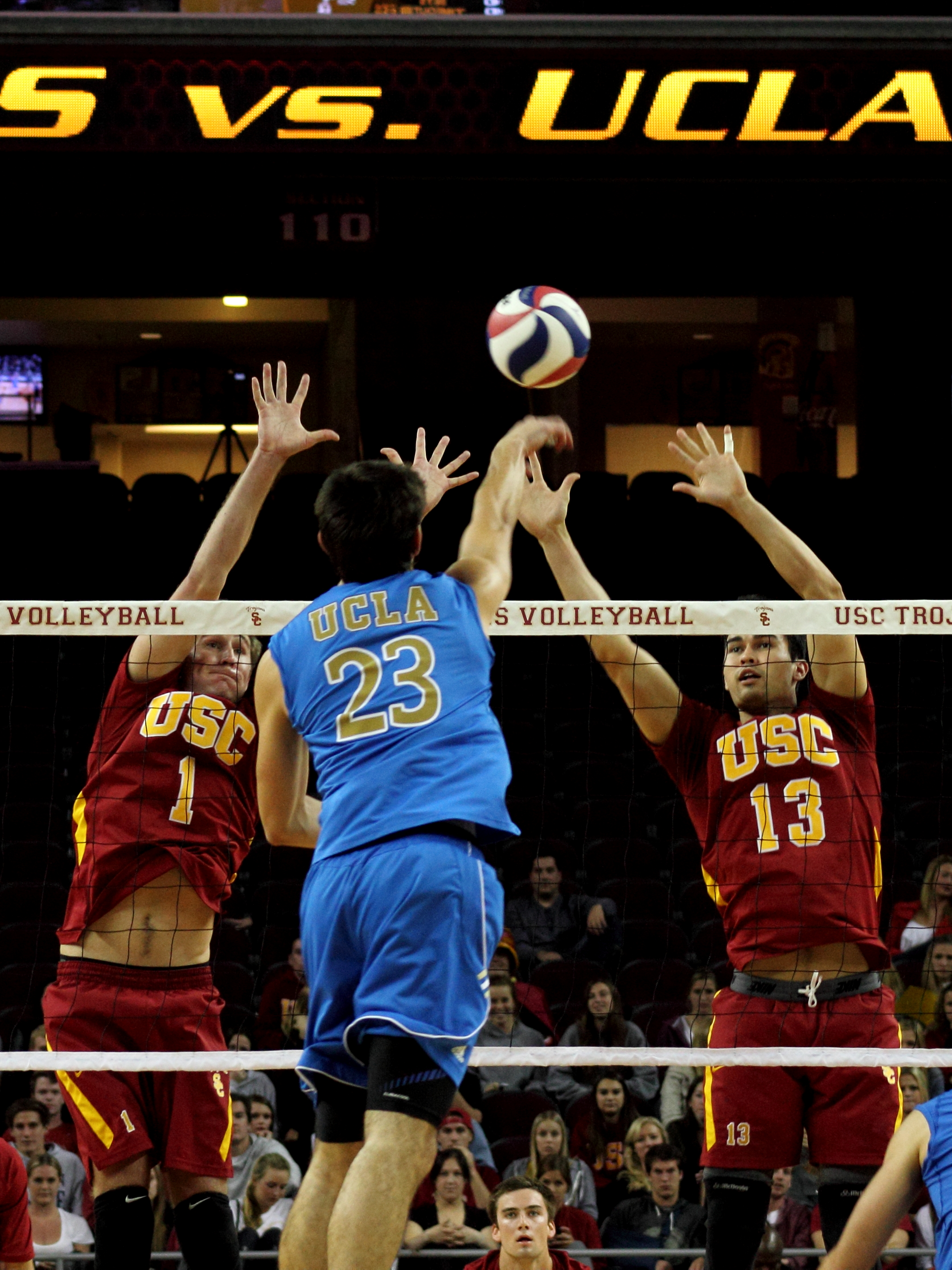
A UCLA vs. USC volleyball match in 2013

UCLA has dominated men's volleyball under the coaching of Al Scates. As of 2024, UCLA has won 21 NCAA championships. The next closest school is Pepperdine with five NCAA titles. USC has won four NCAA titles, the third-winningest program in the sport. UCLA and USC have faced each other in the championship game of the NCAA Men's Volleyball Championship four times.

- 1979 UCLA 3–1 USC
- 1980 USC 3–1 UCLA
- 1981 UCLA 3–2 USC
- 1987 UCLA 3–0 USC

In women's volleyball, UCLA won the 2011 national championship. UCLA now has won four and USC has won three Division I championships. In addition, USC and UCLA each have won three AIAW Women's volleyball championships.

In 1976 USC defeated UCLA to win the AIAW volleyball championship. In 1981 USC defeated UCLA three sets to two in the first NCAA Division I women's volleyball championship match.

=== Water polo ===
The two schools compete in water polo. In men's, UCLA carries a slight lead over USC in the all-time series of 102–94–1. In the NCAA Men's Water Polo Championship, UCLA leads with 13 championships to 10. Due to the low number of schools participating in the sport and the State of California's dominance (no team from outside of California has ever played in the championship match), title game matches between the two teams are relatively common, occurring in 1996, 2009, 2011, 2012, 2014, 2015, 2017, 2020, and 2024, in which UCLA holds a 6-3 advantage.

In women's water polo, UCLA has a 56–42 lead over USC in the all-time series. In the NCAA Women's Water Polo Championship, UCLA dominated early on, winning 7 of the first 9 NCAA Championships, including the first tournament in 2001, with a total of 8 as of the end of the 2025 season. USC has won 6, most recently in 2021. The two teams have faced each other in the women's title game 4 times, in 2006, 2008, 2009, 2021. UCLA won the first 3 matches by scores of 9–8, 6–3, and 5–4, respectively, and USC won the most recent in 2021 by a score of 18-9.

=== Golf ===
In February 2023, the UCLA and USC Women's golf teams began a head to head competition named The Battle For the Bell. A replica of the Football series Victory Bell is the trophy.

== Olympic athletes ==
Both UCLA and USC send many athletes to the Olympic Games. As of the 2020 Summer Olympics, USC athletes account for 326 medals and UCLA athletes account for 270. A USC Trojan has been a Gold medal winner in every summer Olympics since 1912. As of the 2020 Summer Olympics, UCLA and USC athletes combined account for more than one fifth of all medals won by the United States of America. Their 596 combined medals would rank sixth on the country list.

== Rivalry beyond sports ==
College Comparison (2021)
Category	USC	UCLA
Location	Los Angeles, CA	Los Angeles, CA
Ownership	Private university	Public university
Founded	1880	1919
Students	49,500	41,364
School colors	USC Cardinal and USC Gold	UCLA Blue and Westwood Gold
Nickname	Trojans	Bruins
Football stadium	L.A. Coliseum	Rose Bowl
Basketball arena	Galen Center	Pauley Pavilion
Annual tuition	$60,466	$13,258 (CA resident) $43,012 (non-resident)
Undergrad admit rate	9.8%	8.9%

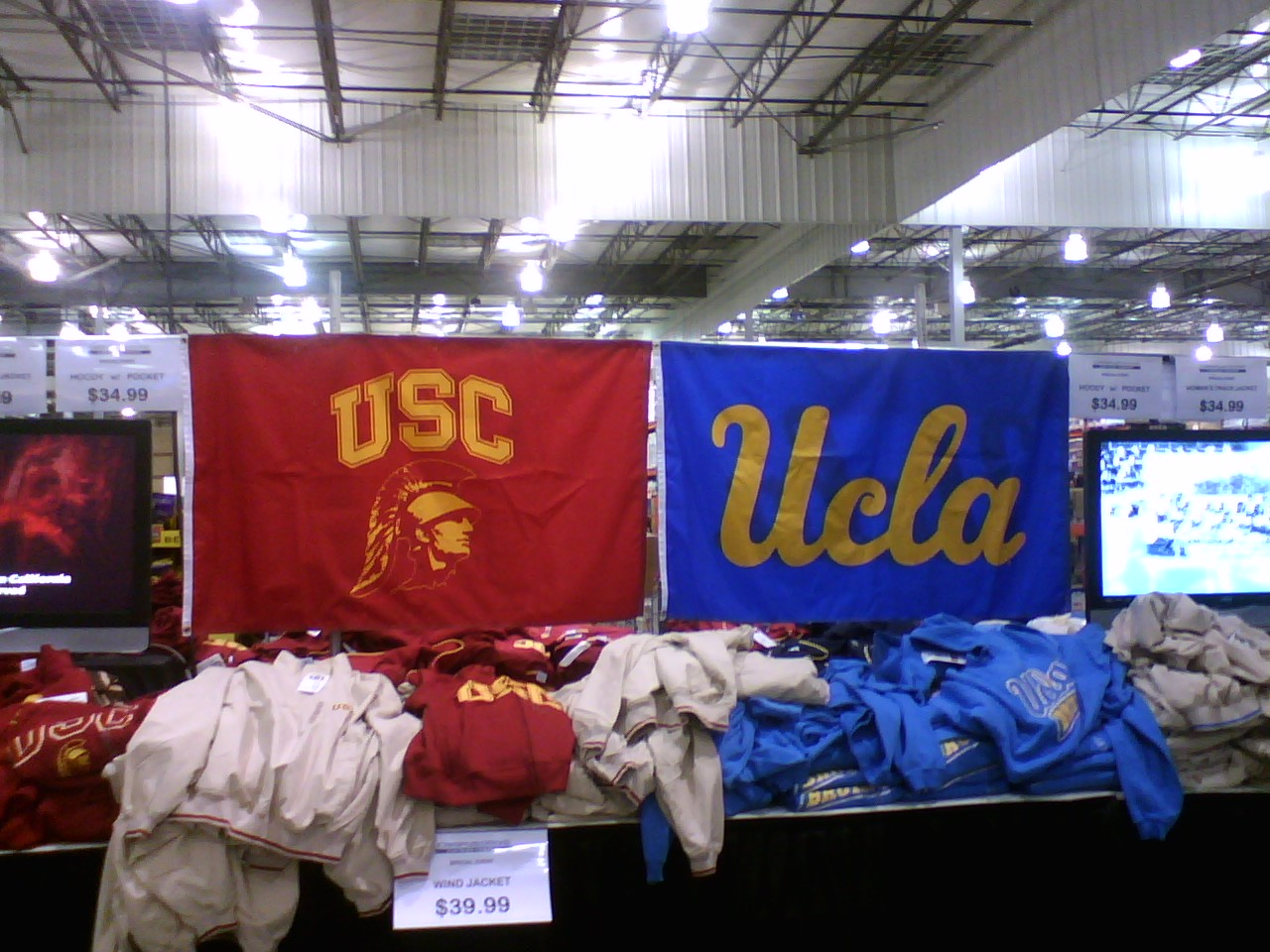
UCLA and USC gear on sale at side by side at Costco

The UCLA–USC rivalry extends beyond athletics, as both universities are often ranked highly in academic lists. Both were Top 30 in U.S. News & World Report's 2022 National University Rankings (UCLA at No. 20, USC at No. 27). Graduate schools at both universities are among the top in their fields. High schools in Southern California send some of their top graduates to both schools every year, as do community colleges around Los Angeles.

Since the universities share the same city, the rivalry is also a microcosm of a geopolitical rivalry based upon location, cost of attendance and growth patterns of the schools.

=== Geography ===
The crosstown rivals are separated by just 11 miles, with UCLA located on the Westside of Los Angeles. The Westwood campus is nestled between several affluent and desirable communities: Brentwood, Bel-Air and Beverly Hills. Although the area was relatively remote and unsettled at the time of UCLA's move to the campus in 1929, a century of growth in the area has made the location a bustling hub.

In 2012, Bruins football coach Jim Mora said he sold recruits on the safety of UCLA's campus location: "I mean, we don't have murders one block off our campus." He denied he was making a reference to USC, where two graduate students had been murdered near campus just months earlier.

USC, by contrast, is located in the University Park neighborhood of South Los Angeles by Exposition Park. It was a fashionable area in the early years of the city, but the 20th century saw the rapid decline of the area's manufacturing base and increasing crime. By the early 2000s, the crime rate had declined significantly and the city began an effort to "erase a stigma that has dogged the southern part of the city" by changing the name from "South Central" to "South Los Angeles". The university has recently expanded its campus reach in the area with a renovated USC Village town center for retail and residential space.

=== Funding and cost of attendance ===
The University of California is a public university, while the University of Southern California is a private university. As a public university, UCLA offers discounted tuition for California residents. UCLA's estimated cost of attendance (tuition and fees, housing and meals, books, etc.) for 2021-22 is approximately $36,297 for in-state students vs. $66,051 for out-of-state students. At USC, no differentiation in fees is made for students and the estimated cost of attendance for 2021-22 is $81,659. Costs of attendance at both universities can be offset by financial aid, in the form of loans or grants based on merit or need or both. This includes athletic scholarships.

=== Founding ===
USC was established in 1880, at a time when Los Angeles had a population of 11,000. The university formally opened with 53 students and 10 faculty. UCLA was founded in 1919 when California Gov. William D. Stephens signed California Assembly Bill 626, establishing the Southern Branch of the University of California. The university became the University of California at Los Angeles in 1926 (the “at” was replaced by a comma in 1958), and moved to its current campus in 1929.

== UCLA–USC rivalry in popular culture ==
- On the Jack Benny NBC radio program from November 26, 1950 (the Sunday after that season's UCLA-USC game), the episode was about Jack trying to go to the game with Mary Livingstone and Dennis Day. Jack also had the USC and UCLA coaches as guests on his television show.
- The Sports Illustrated Swimsuit Issue in 1989 is the magazine's top-selling issue of all-time. On page 225 is a photo of a UCLA student posing in a bikini in her bedroom, while in the background are a Bruin bear wearing a button with a four-letter expletive directed at USC, "Fuck SC", and a poster underneath that says "My Two Favorite Teams are the BRUINS and Whoever Is Playing USC." The St. Petersburg Times brought the picture to the magazine's attention. Sports Illustrated managing editor Mark Mulvoy responded, "You're the first person to tell me this. Twenty million people have read that issue and no one noticed it. We did not do it on purpose. This was not an attempt to sneak the word into Sports Illustrated. I regret it." The Register-Guard, the daily newspaper of Eugene, Oregon (home to fellow Pac-12 member Oregon), wrote that the magazine was accustomed to criticism for Swimsuit Issue photos being too revealing. The newspaper published an accompanying photo of the magazine cover with the caption, "The SI cover was OK, but page 225 wasn't".
- In a 2005 ESPN commercial, a man wearing a UCLA sweatshirt opens his door on Halloween to find a young Trick-or-treater dressed in a Trojan outfit. He closes his door in disgust without handing out any candy. (The commercial's comedy lies in the fact that UCLA and USC fans retain a lifetime rivalry with each other, while still living side by side.)
- In a 2006 episode of The New Adventures of Old Christine, Old Christine's ex-husband, Richard, takes their son Richie to the UCLA–USC game at the Coliseum.
- In 2013, A City Divided, a documentary film that chronicled the rivalry was directed by Emmy Award winning filmmaker Jack Baric and produced by former USC All-American quarterback Paul McDonald. The film, which was broadcast on Fox Sports West, was used as the catalyst for "Rivals United for a Kure," a campaign to raise funds for cancer research.

== See also ==
- UCLA Bruins athletics
- USC Trojans athletics
- 1967 USC vs. UCLA football game
- Game of the Century (college football)
- SoCal BMW Crosstown Cup
- List of NCAA schools with the most NCAA Division I championships

=== Other Pac-12 football rivalries ===
- Apple Cup – Trophy for the Washington / Washington State football game
- Oregon–Oregon State football rivalry – Oregon / Oregon State football game
- Big Game – Stanford / California football game
- Rumble in the Rockies – Colorado / Utah football game
- Territorial Cup – Trophy for the Arizona / Arizona State football game

=== Other Crosstown Rivalries in Los Angeles ===
- Freeway Series
- Freeway Face-Off
- Lakers–Clippers rivalry
- El Tráfico
