= Victory Bell =

Victory Bell may refer to:

- Blue Key Victory Bell, awarded to the winner of the football game between Ball State University and Indiana State University
- Governor's Victory Bell, awarded to the winner of the football game between the University of Minnesota and Pennsylvania State University
- Victory Bell (Cincinnati–Miami), awarded to the winner of the football game between the University of Cincinnati and Miami University
- Victory Bell (Duke–North Carolina), awarded to the winner of the football game between Duke University and the University of North Carolina at Chapel Hill
- Victory Bell, awarded to the winner of the Missouri–Nebraska football game
- Victory Bell (Pacific–San Jose State), formerly awarded to the winner of the football game between the University of the Pacific and San Jose State University
- Victory Bell (UCLA–USC), awarded to the winner of the football game between the University of Southern California and the University of California, Los Angeles
- Victory Bell (University of Portland), Oregon, two bells rung for sporting and other events
- Victory Bell, rung by Fordham University football players
- Victory Bell, rung by Washington State University football players
- Victory Bell, former rivalry trophy of Cal Poly and Fresno State and currently rung at Cal Poly football games after scores
- Victory Bell, former football rivalry trophy of Santa Clara and Saint Mary's

== See also ==
- Victreebel, a carnivorous Pokémon based on the pitcher plant
