= George Tirebiter =

Former canine mascot of the University of Southern California

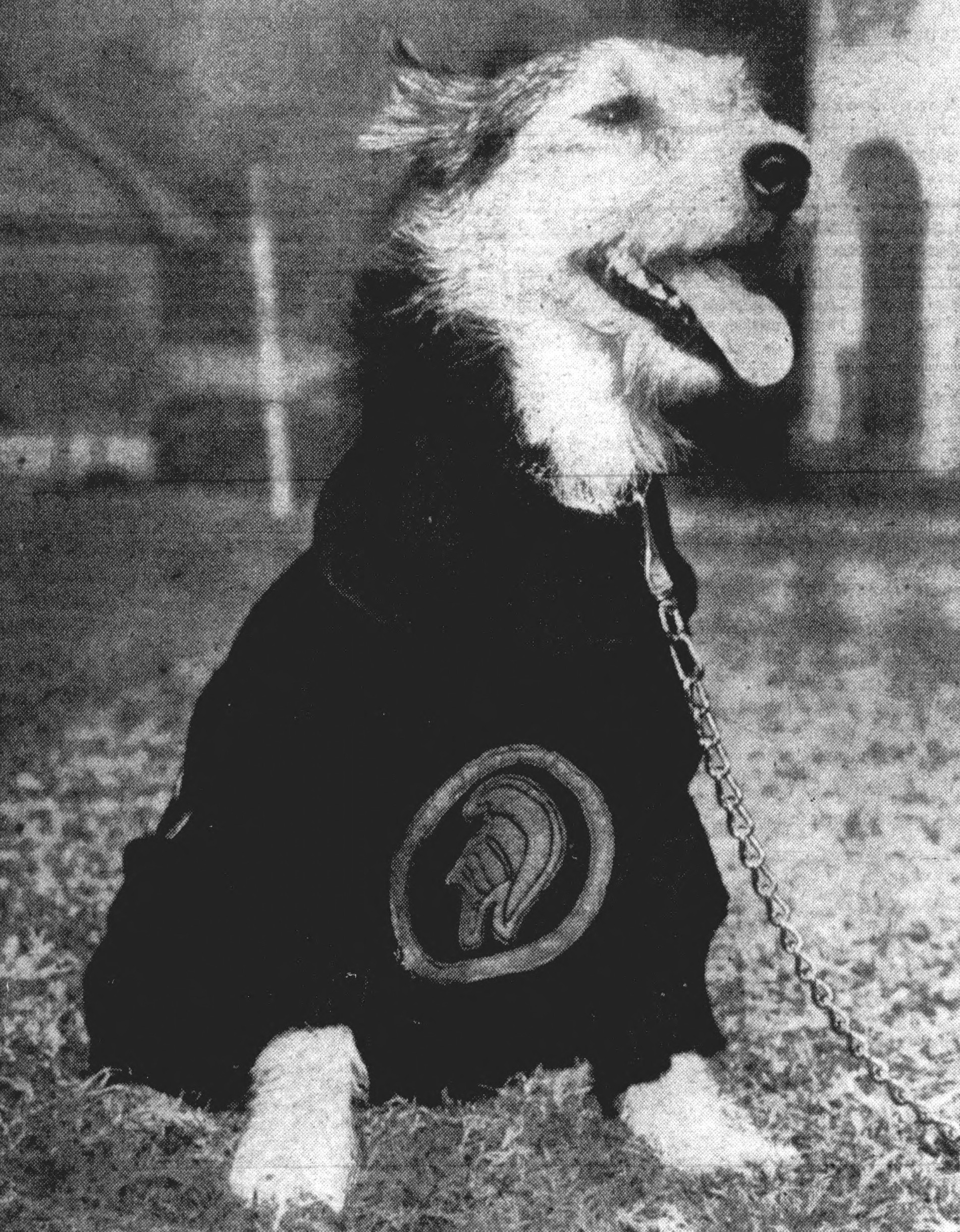
George Tirebiter II wearing a USC Trojans sweater in 1950.

George Tirebiter was the nickname initially given to a dog at the University of Southern California in the 1940s who was the unofficial mascot of the school before becoming the official mascot on October 22, 1947. The nickname was passed on to George Tirebiter's subsequent successors after the original Tirebiter's death in 1950. The original Tirebiter was a nationally known figure and beloved canine of the University of Southern California. He would lead the marching band out at home football games and once even entered in an armored car. Tirebiter was kidnapped, or thought to have been kidnapped, multiple times by the University of Southern California's rival the University of California, Los Angeles, USC student politicians for publicity, and once possibly by a newspaper. The line of Tirebiters lasted through 1961 when the legacy of the Tirebiter mascots was replaced with Traveler, the white Andalusian horse ridden by a Trojan rider at USC home football games and various other university events.

== Origins ==
There exists a wide range of possible stories for Tirebiter's origin.

One claims that a stray dog was discovered by a group of USC students at Currie's Ice Cream parlor and that one student remarked that the dog looked like a Navy V-12 student named George Kuhns. Thus, the dog was dubbed "George".

Another story was that the dog was the pet of a local couple and that he was initially named "Leo". When the couple split the dog was abandoned before being adopted by a local woman, Ann Schreiber. She was supposedly a great lover of dogs who wanted to provide for the lost dog. She named him "George" due to the resemblance he bore to a friend of hers.

Another origin story was claimed by Dan Schiavone, president of the Trojan Knights, on the occasion of a memorial ceremony honoring Tirebiter on September 21, 1950. Schiavone claimed that Tirebiter was a K-9 police dog that was discarded from the program and subsequently found as a stray on USC's campus. However, the veracity of this account is somewhat in question due to the context of the speech and this being the singular mention of such an origin.

He received the surname "Tirebiter" because he would bite at the tires of cars he chased down Trousdale Parkway, which bisects the campus. (Today Trousdale is only open to foot traffic.)

== George Tirebiter I ==
The first George Tirebiter was for a period of around six years the unofficial mascot of USC. He was notable for chasing down passing cars and nipping at their wheels. The dog quickly became a staple to the student body. He was pampered by the fraternities and sororities in USC's Greek community, routinely being carried back and forth from campus and being fed ice cream.

In 1947, the student body urged the student government to designate George Tirebiter as the official mascot of USC. In an elaborate celebration involving a parade of 30 cars, a marching band, and campus celebrities, George Tirebiter was crowned the official mascot of the University of Southern California on October 22, 1947.

Shortly after his coronation as official mascot, George Tirebiter was kidnapped by UCLA students on October 30, 1947. He was taken from USC's campus and sedated. Then the UCLA students shaved the letters U-C-L-A into the fur on Tirebiter's back. To take the prank one step further they took Tirebiter by the Los Angeles Times to be photographed for the paper. After this ordeal, Tirebiter was finally returned to USC in a "doped and confused" state.

Once he became the official mascot, the Trojan Knights became his handler at campus events and football games. At football games, Tirebiter would be led out onto the field with the marching band and for the length of the game stand in front of the student rooting section.

George became further endeared to the student body when he bit UCLA mascot Joe Bruin on the nose at a home football game and chased after Oski, the Golden Bear mascot of the University of California Berkeley, at another home game.

In 1948, Tirebiter got into trouble with city health officials because of two incidents of biting people and his semi-stray status. The city presented an ultimatum to USC. They required that someone or some organization assume responsibility and ownership for the dog or he would be turned into the pound. In the wake of these events on September 29, 1948, the Trojan Knights decided that they would take responsibility for Tirebiter's housing, food, ownership, legal liability, and transportation.

After assuming responsibility for the dog, the Trojan Knights built a doghouse on Bovard Field for him. Due to Tirebiter's loud barking and his proximity to classrooms, numerous professors complained about the noise and disruption he caused. One professor actually proposed that one student should always be on "Tirebiter duty" to pet the dog and make sure he did not disrupt class.

Throughout Tirebiter's time as USC's unofficial and official mascot, many people attempted to describe what kind of dog Tirebiter could possibly be. The most common characterization was that he was merely a pound mutt. Other attempts, even by canine experts, had similarly underwhelming conclusions. A zoology professor described him as "sort of an Airedale Terrier," but conceded that "it would take another 100 years of breeding to produce another George."

In 1949, Tirebiter's already surly nature began to get worse. The Trojan Knights decided to place him in the care of a local animal shelter with the hopes that he would recover. However, his condition did not improve. In early 1950, he no longer even recognized or acknowledged his caretakers. Eddy and George Prussell, former presidents of the Trojan Knights, conferred with Dean of Students Bernard L. Hyink to decide on a solution. They decided to send him to the farm of Bill Hubbard, a Trojan alumnus, in El Centro, California, for the summer so that the dog could recover. Sadly, sometime during June 1950, Tirebiter was run over by a passing car on the farm and killed. For the next three months, however, this news was not disseminated to the public. It was not until September 19, 1950, that Tirebiter's fate was known. A Daily Trojan writer routinely asked Dan Schiavone, the president of the Trojan Knights, "How's Tirebiter getting along?" Schiavone responded matter-of-factly, "He's dead." This news was then broken on September 20, 1950, by the Daily Trojan with the full page headline "Tirebiter is Dead!"

The student body then planned a memorial ceremony for Tirebiter on September 22, 1950. The ceremony was led by Schiavone and consisted of a parade of convertibles with black bunting, a marching band, and the student body. Upon reaching Tirebiter's cement footprints, immortalized during Tirebiter's coronation in 1947, a memorial wreath was laid and a trumpeter played "Taps" as the campus said farewell to its beloved canine mascot.

== Successors ==
=== Search for a successor ===
The day before the memorial ceremony for Tirebiter I, plans were already being made to find a successor of some sort for the mascot. A ballot was printed in the Daily Trojan with choices of "George Jr., Other Animal, Statue of George, or Other Object.". Nominations of all sorts began to pour in from the student body. Through one day of voting, Delta Tau Delta's pedigreed boxer "Sully" led the voting. Behind him were the Trojan Knights's proposed successor "George Jr.", who they claimed was Tirebiter I's son, and the Acacia fraternity's bulldog "Pythagoras." In addition to these early leaders, a variety of other canines and memorials were proposed.

On September 25, 1950, Acacia decided to withdraw Pythagoras from the campaign. Don Gibbs, the fraternity president, explained, "We do not feel that a fraternity-owned dog would make a good mascot because of the competition between fraternities. A true mascot must have the complete backing of the entire student body in promoting school athletic spirit. Therefore, we are withdrawing 'Pythagoras'."

Additionally on September 25, it was announced that "Hector the Horse", a spotted Palomino horse had been entered into the race by the Trovets, a spirit and service organization. Floyd McCann, president of the Trovets, claimed, "We feel that Hector the Trojan Horse is a much more dignified and appropriate symbol of SC tradition than some dog. George was a character in his own right and voluntarily adopted the Trojans. But we don't believe he can be replaced by draft methods." This quote, now seems quite prescient in light of USC's adopting its iconic mascot, Traveler, in 1961.

On September 26, it became a showdown between "George Tirebiter II" and "Hector the Trojan Horse" after the withdrawal of Sully, the Delta Tau Delta boxer. Although Hector was leading by a slim margin of 36 votes, possible financial problems with Hector were reported by the Daily Trojan. They calculated that it would be considerably more expensive to have an equine mascot than a canine mascot. This was due to Hector not being owned by USC, but rather being rented from a nearby stable.

On September 28, it was announced that George Tirebiter II would be the official successor to Tirebiter I. The final vote in the student body senate was guided by Tirebiter II's victory in the Daily Trojan student poll 800 votes to Hector's 518. It is a remarkable increase in voting in one day that finally decided the winner. Tirebiter II's candidacy was most likely aided by the financial questions relating to Hector's ownership and upkeep.

=== Tirebiter II ===
George Tirebiter II was named the official mascot on September 28, 1950. He made his official debut at a football spirit rally for the USC-Iowa game on September 29.

== Statue ==
In 2006, USC unveiled a statue celebrating the mascot's memory. The life-size statue portrays George Tirebiter II (although he is often mistaken for George Tirebiter I) with a small piece of chewed tire and is located at the south end of campus on Trousdale Parkway between the Mudd Hall of Philosophy and the Leventhal School of Accounting. George is facing Exposition Park and the Los Angeles Memorial Coliseum: the home stadium for USC Trojans football. During "Troy Week", the week before the annual rivalry football game against UCLA, the Trojan Knights, with the help of USC facilities management, erect a cardinal and gold doghouse around the statue to protect it from possible vandalism.

The plaque on the statue reads:

George Tirebiter was a shaggy mutt who - for a few glorious years in the '40s and '50s - became a beloved Trojan mascot. No one is quite sure when George wandered onto campus, but his feisty personality made him a student favorite as he chased cars and bit tires along University Avenue, not far from where you stand. He was taken to football games in a limousine where he led the Trojan marching band onto the field, often wearing sweaters and odd little hats. He once drew the cheers of thousands when he bit the mask of UCLA mascot, Joe Bruin, on the nose. Rumor has it there is a transcript on file showing George with a GPA of 3.2 in such courses as Chasing Cats 101 and Biting Tires 270. Of all the great USC mascots, none had the bite of George Tirebiter.

== Cultural references ==
The protagonist of the 1970 Firesign Theatre album Don't Crush That Dwarf, Hand Me the Pliers was named George Leroy Tirebiter, after the dog, and that album's movie-within-a-play, High School Madness featured a boy named Porgy Tirebiter. George Leroy Tirebiter appears in other Firesign Theatre works.

== See also ==
- List of individual dogs
