= USC Helenes =

The USC Helenes, founded in 1921, is one of the University of Southern California's oldest service organizations.

== History ==
In 1921 Arabella De Oliviera established the USC Helenes as an all-female service organization. Originally, the Helenes were called the Amazons and membership was reserved for upperclassmen. The underclassmen involved were divided into two groups: the Chimes and the Spurs. When the Amazons changed their name in 1969 to the "Helenes," the three separate branches became one, unified organization. The name change was implemented to keep with the Trojan theme of the University and was inspired by the iconic Helen of Troy.

In 2021, the Helenes became a gender-inclusive organization and opened membership to non-women.

The organization recently celebrated 100 years of service and tradition at USC and continues to be a presence on campus and in the surrounding LA area. After the unveiling of the statue of Hecuba in the USC Village, the Helenes began guarding the statue as part of rivalry "Conquest Week" activities surrounding the annual game against UCLA.

As of Fall 2016, Erica Lovano McCann serves as the Helenes faculty advisor.

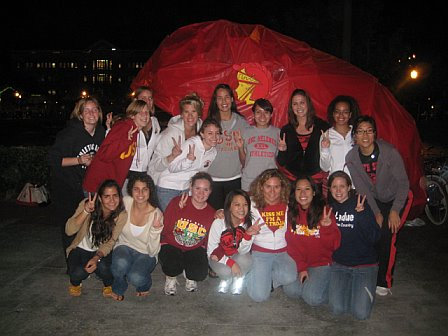
The Helenes created a Homecoming float in 2007.

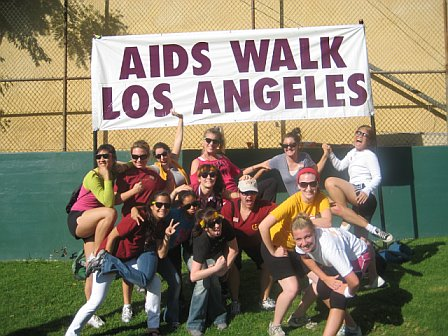
the Helenes participate in an AIDS walk.

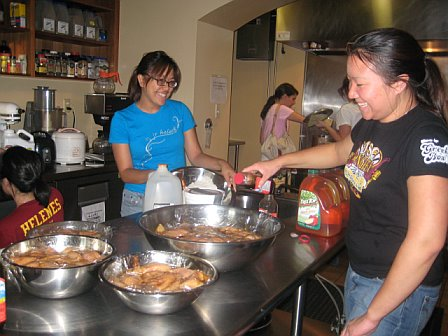
Helenes are active members of the LA community: here they prepare a warm meal for those in need.

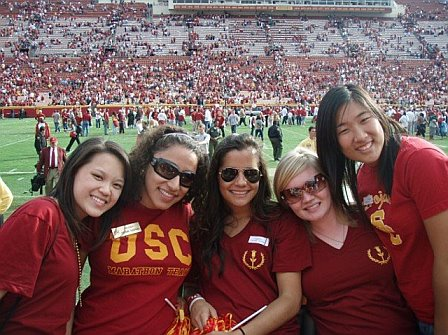
The Helenes arrive hours early to football games to help decorate the student section of the stadium
