= Southern California Crosstown Cup =

Year-long sports competition between USC and UCLA

Logo of the Crosstown Cup

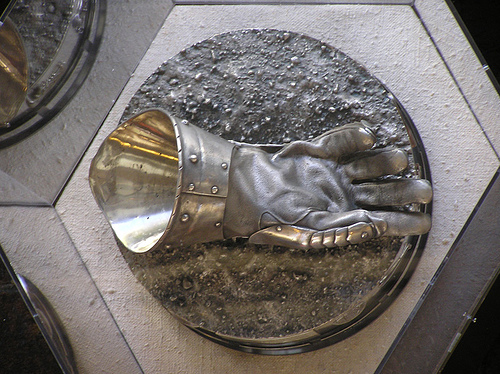
UCLA–USC Lexus Gauntlet (2001–2009)

The Southern California Crosstown Cup is a year-long all-sports college competition between the UCLA Bruins and the USC Trojans. While UCLA and USC have had a sports rivalry since the 1920s, the official yearly head-to-head all-sports competition began with the 2001–2002 season as the Lexus Gauntlet. After the 2008–2009 season, Lexus' sponsorship ended. For the next five seasons USC and UCLA continued to keep track of the scores and yearly winners. Without an official sponsor, the competition was referred to as the Crosstown Gauntlet from fall 2009 to spring 2014. Starting with the 2014–2015 season, the series was sponsored for two years by The Southern California BMW Centers and renamed the SoCal BMW Crosstown Cup. Since the 2016–2017 season there has again been no official sponsor and the competition has been referred to as the Crosstown Cup.

During the original Lexus sponsorship, a Northern California version of the Gauntlet was held between Stanford University and University of California, Berkeley for three seasons.

== Scoring structure ==
Points are awarded for each of the 19 NCAA-sanctioned sports in which the two schools compete against each other. Each of these 19 varsity sports is worth 10 points. All regular season and postseason head-to-head competition in a single sport counts as a series, and all of the points for that sport are awarded to the winner of the series. Points are split in the event of a series tie. For sports without head-to-head competition, such as both men's and women's golf, all of the points for that sport are awarded based on which school finishes higher in the conference tournament. In sports with both head-to-head and multi-competitor events, such as swimming and track & field, only the head-to-head results are counted. For example, as there is only one match played, a football victory is worth 10 points, while all head-to-head Men's water polo victories count as a series worth 10 total points. Currently, with 19 active sports in which UCLA and USC compete against each other, there are 190 points available in a season, with 100 needed to clinch an overall win. In the event of a tie after all points have been settled, there are three tiebreakers. The first tiebreaker is regular season head-to-head wins. If a tie remains, next is postseason head-to-head wins. Finally, the third tiebreaker is whichever school won the most conference championships in head-to-head sports.

Under the original Lexus sponsorship and the unsponsored period from 2009 to 2014, the scoring structure was slightly different. Instead of each sport being worth 10 points, only football, men's basketball, women's basketball, and women's volleyball were worth 10 points. All other sports were worth 5 points. As a result, there were originally 110 points available with 57.5 points needed to win. After the two schools began competing in women's beach volleyball for the 2012–2013, this changed to 115 points available and 60 needed to win.

== UCLA–USC ==
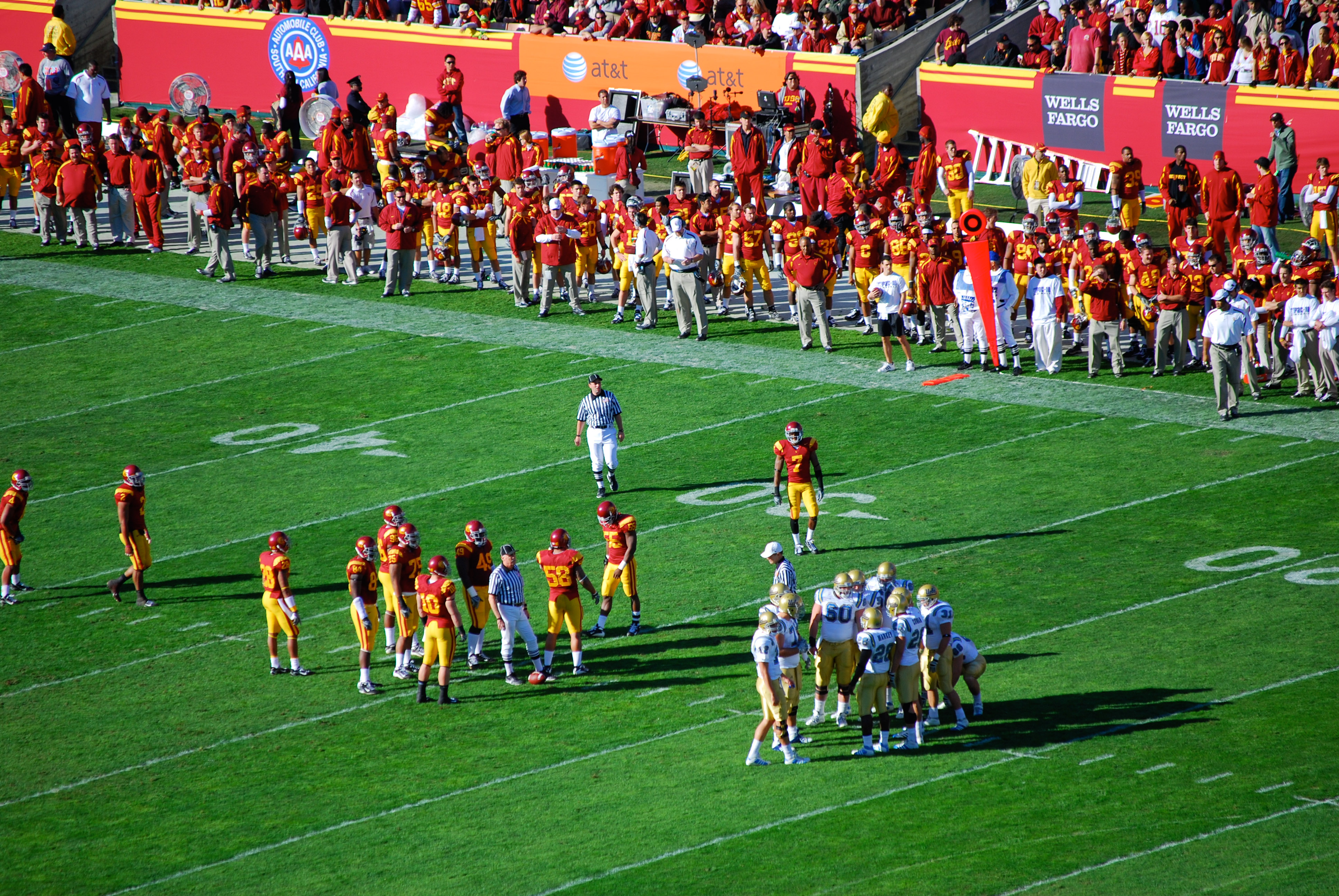
The football portion of the Gauntlet, UCLA vs. USC

The Southern version matched Los Angeles rivals the University of Southern California and the University of California, Los Angeles. It began with the 2001 Fall season.

Winners by year

Year	Winner	Score	Notes
Lexus Gauntlet			
2001–02	USC	55–55	USC won with the first tiebreaker: regular season head-to-head wins (16–15)
2002–03	UCLA	55–55	UCLA won with the second tiebreaker: postseason head-to-head wins (4–0)
2003–04	USC	57.5–52.5	
2004–05	UCLA	67.5–42.5	UCLA clinched the Gauntlet prior to the conclusion of the athletic season, and the resulting trophy inscription showed the score 70–40. Afterwards, USC won back 2.5 points with a victory over UCLA in the NCAA Women's Tennis Championship
2005–06	USC	60–50	
2006–07	UCLA	72.5–37.5	
2007–08	USC	67.5–42.5	
2008–09	USC	65–45	
Crosstown Gauntlet			
2009–10	USC	65–45	
2010–11	USC	72.5–37.5	
2011–12	USC	62.5–47.5	
2012–13	UCLA	65–50	
2013–14	USC	60–55	
SoCal BMW Crosstown Cup			
2014–15	UCLA	95–85	First year under new scoring system; each sport is now worth 10 points. Teams did not meet in Women's Beach Volleyball, meaning the total points possible were 10 less than in subsequent years.
2015–16	USC	120–70	
Crosstown Cup			
2016–17	UCLA	105–85	Starting this year, the schools quietly stopped referring to this competition by the sponsored name and instead used Crosstown Cup. The new scoring system was retained.
2017–18	UCLA	115–75	
2018–19	USC	105–85	
2019–20	Suspended	85–45	UCLA was leading when the competition was suspended due to the COVID-19 Pandemic.
2020–21	USC	100–90	
2021–22	UCLA	100–90	
2022–23	USC	105–85	
2023–24	UCLA	120–70	
2024–25	USC	115–75	
2025–26	UCLA	115–75	
Total Wins			
	USC	14–10	

== California–Stanford ==
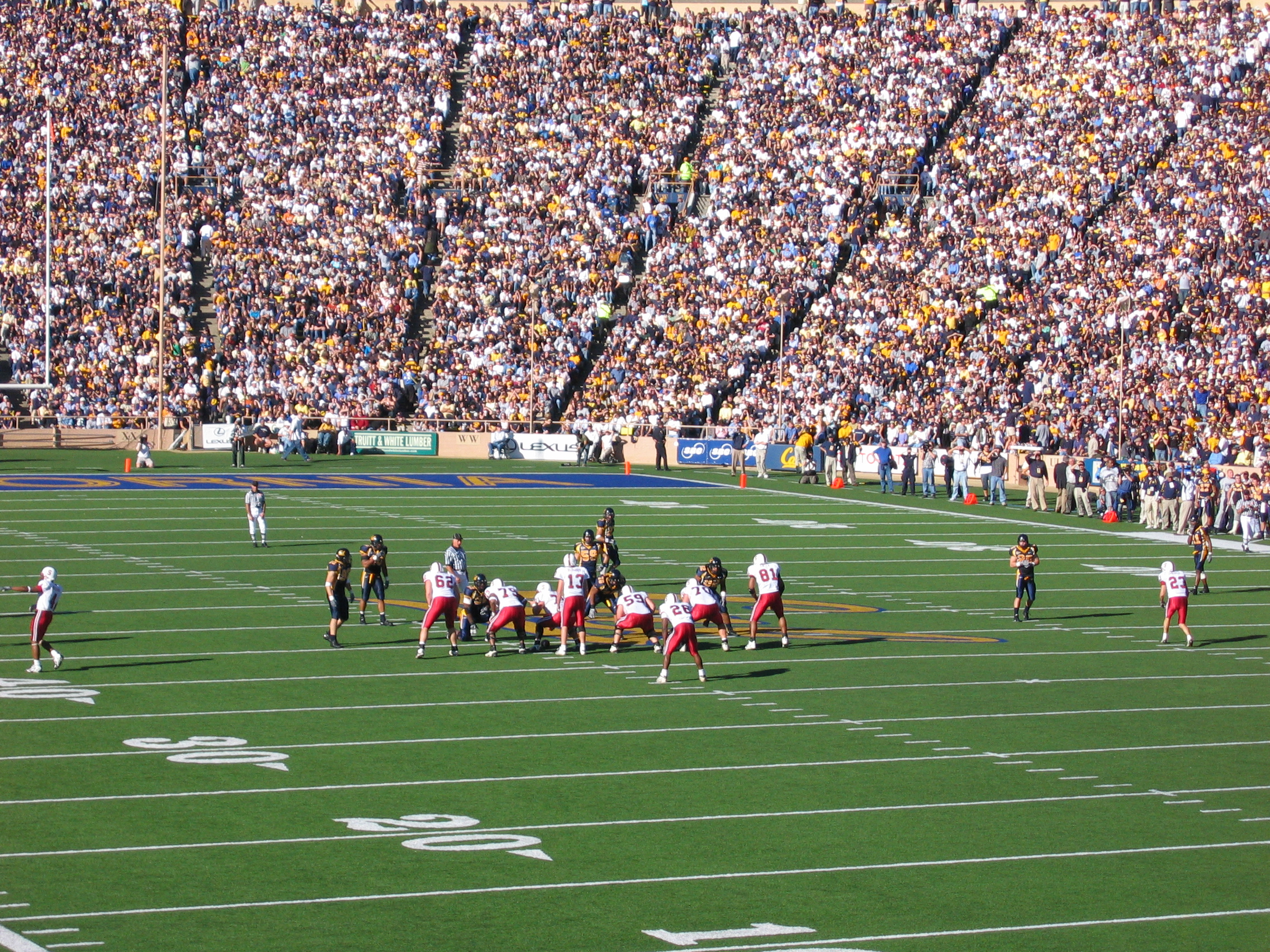
The football portion of the Gauntlet, Cal vs. Stanford

The Northern version matched Bay Area rivals Stanford University and the University of California, Berkeley. It began with the 2004 fall season and ended after the 2007 spring season.

Winners by year

Year	Winner	Score
2004–05	Stanford	70–65
2005–07	Stanford	77.5–57.5

== See also ==
- Big Game
- UCLA–USC rivalry
