= Traveler (mascot) =

University of Southern California mascot

- Traveler logo
- University: University of Southern California
- Conference: Big 10
- First seen: 1961

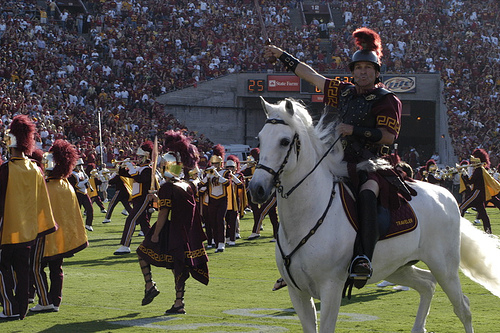
Traveler on the sidelines during a football game.

Traveler is a horse who is the mascot of the University of Southern California. Traveler appears at all USC home football games in the Los Angeles Memorial Coliseum as well as many other outdoor events, including numerous Rose Parades. The current horse is Traveler IX. Although the Traveler web site describes Traveler as "pure white," most of the horses who have served as Traveler are actually gray horses whose hair coats have become completely white. (Truly white horses are rare.) On November 4, 2012, the costumed version of Tommy and Traveler were introduced for men's and women's basketball games.

Traveler horse statue

== Introduction ==
Traveler was introduced in the autumn of 1961, during the USC Trojans football team's home opener at the Coliseum, against the Georgia Tech Yellow Jackets. To dress Traveler's rider Richard Saukko as a Trojan warrior, USC used its connections to the film industry to procure the costume worn by Charlton Heston in Ben Hur two years earlier. The costume proved to be too heavy for extended use, so Saukko made his own leather uniform for the 1962 season and the same costume has been used since. The name was believed to have been inspired by the gray horse Traveller, ridden by Civil War Confederate general Robert E. Lee, In August 2017 concerns that the horse's name had a connection to Lee led to further research, which revealed that the first Traveler was acquired with his name, spelled with one L, in 1957 after he had become unreliable as a movie horse. On Equinespot.com, Traveler is listed as one of the six most common horse names to begin with the letter T.

== See also ==
- List of historical horses
