= Widney =

Widney is a surname. Notable people with the surname include:

- Joseph Widney (1841–1938), American doctor, educator, historian, and religious leader
- Robert M. Widney (1838–1929), American lawyer and judge
