= History of the University of Southern California =

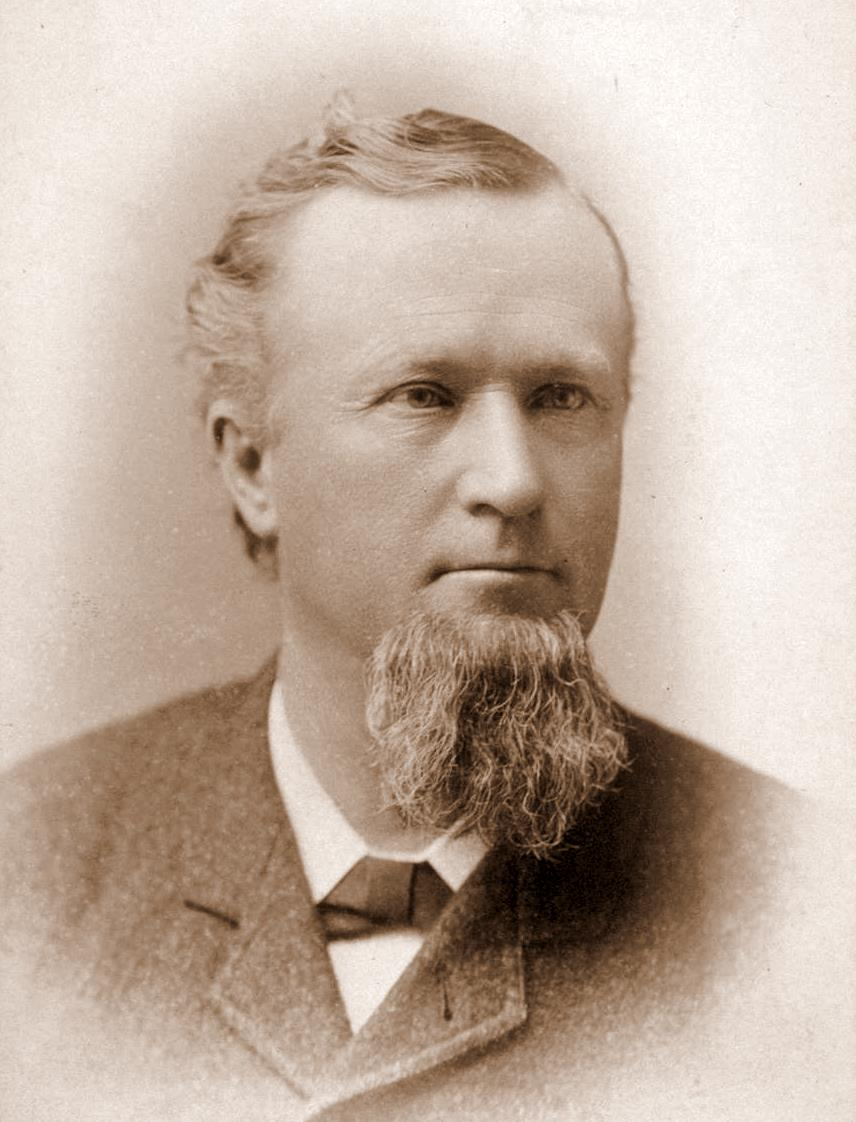
Robert M. Widney, founder of the university, photographed in 1885

The University of Southern California was founded in 1880, and is the oldest private research university in California.

== Founding and early years ==
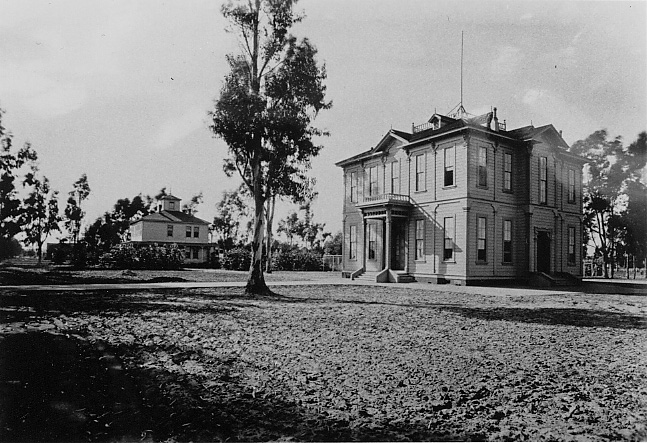
The Widney Alumni House, the campus's first building

The University of Southern California was co-founded by Judge Robert M. Widney, who helped secure donations from several key figures in early Los Angeles history, along with a Protestant nurseryman, Ozro Childs; an Irish Catholic former governor, John Gately Downey; and a German Jewish banker, Isaias W. Hellman. The three donated 308 lots of land to establish the campus and provided the necessary seed money for the construction of the first buildings. Originally operated in affiliation with the Methodist Church, the school mandated from the start that "no student would be denied admission because of race". The university is no longer affiliated with any church, having severed formal ties in 1952. When USC opened in 1880, tuition was $15.00 per term, and students were not allowed to leave town without the knowledge and consent of the university president. The school had an enrollment of 53 students and a faculty of 10. The city lacked paved streets, electric lights, telephones, and a reliable fire-alarm system. Its first graduating class in 1884 was a class of three—two males and female valedictorian Minnie C. Miltimore.

In 1929, USC established the country's first filmmaking program through the USC Department of Cinema, in collaboration with the Academy of Motion Picture Arts and Sciences.

=== Symbols ===
The colors of USC are cardinal and gold, which were approved by USC's third president, the Reverend George W. White, in 1896. In 1958, the shade of gold, which was originally more of an orange color, was changed to a more yellow shade. The letterman's awards were the first to make the change.^{[d]}

=== Athletics ===
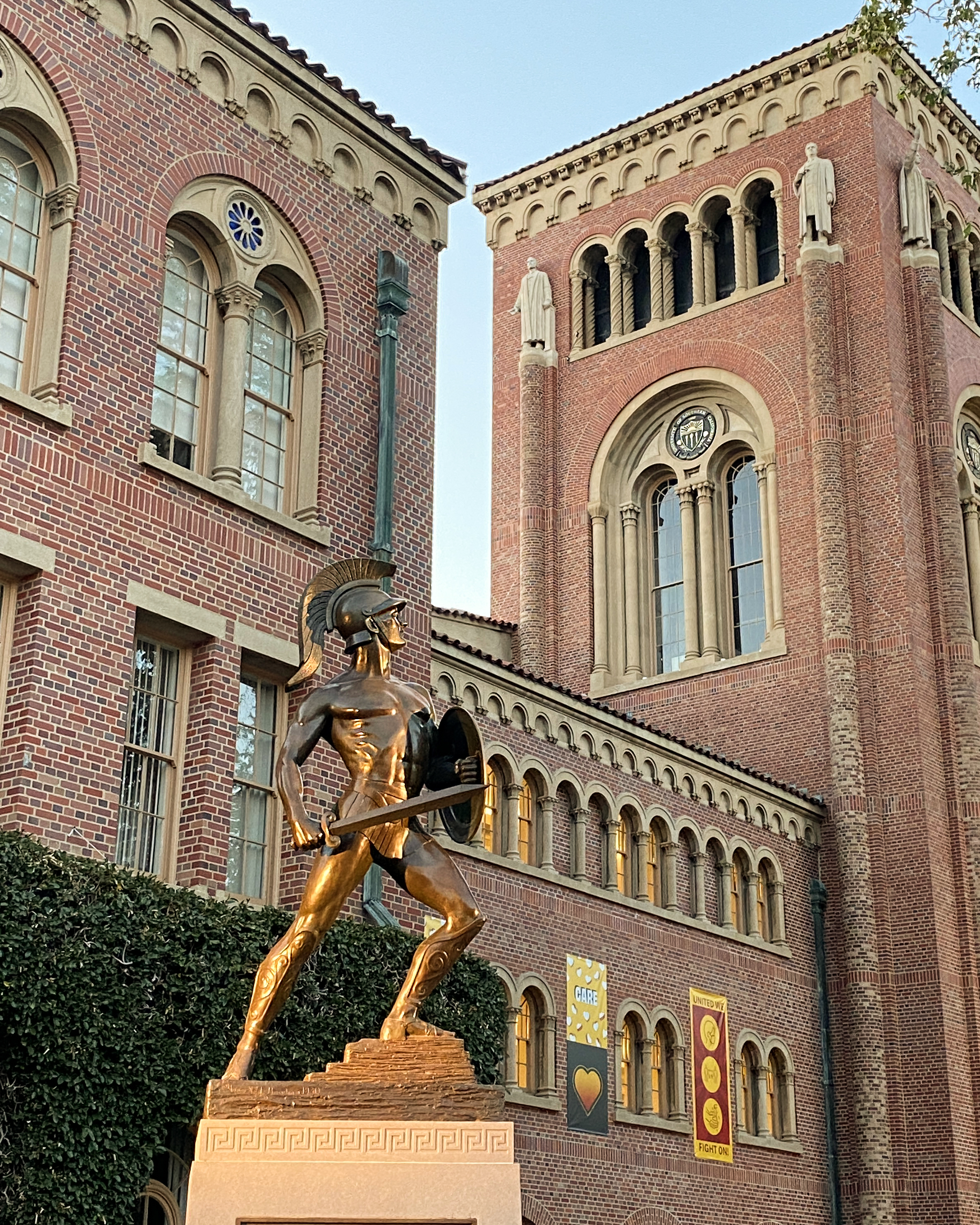
"Tommy Trojan" is a major symbol of the university, though he is not the mascot.

USC students and athletes are currently known as Trojans, epitomized by the Trojan Shrine, nicknamed "Tommy Trojan", near the center of campus. Until 1912, USC students (especially athletes) were known as Fighting Methodists or Wesleyans, though neither name was approved by the university. During a fateful track and field meet with Stanford University, the USC team was beaten early and seemingly conclusively. After only the first few events, it seemed implausible USC would ever win, but the team fought back, winning many of the later events, to lose only by a slight margin. After this contest, Los Angeles Times sportswriter Owen Bird reported the USC athletes "fought on like the Trojans of antiquity", and the president of the university at the time, George F. Bovard, approved the name officially.

USC joined the Pacific Coast Conference(PCC) in 1922. In 1959 PCC was dissolved and replaced by the Athletic Association of Western Universities(AAWU), of which USC was a founding member of alongside California, Stanford, UCLA, and Washington. With the addition of Oregon and Oregon State, the conference was renamed into the Pac-8.

On June 30, 2022, USC announced that they are switching conferences from the Pac-12 to the Big Ten effective on August 2, 2024, along with UCLA.

== 20th century ==
The university oversaw a massive expansion of its programs throughout the 20th century: founding the Gould School of Law in 1900, the School of Engineering and the School of Pharmacy in 1905, the Rossier School of Education in 1909, the School of Architecture in 1914, the Suzanne Dworak-Peck School of Social Work in 1920, the Price School of Public Policy and the School of Cinematic Arts in 1929.

=== School of Cinematic Arts ===
In 1929, USC established the country's first filmmaking program through the USC Department of Cinema, in collaboration with the Academy of Motion Picture Arts and Sciences.

Douglas Fairbanks first pitched his idea for a film school to his fencing partner, Rufus B. von KleinSmid, then-president of University of Southern California. In 1929, USC offered its first film course, Introduction to Photoplay, taught by Fairbanks’ friend Irving Thalberg, Mary Pickford and D.W. Griffith. The course led to the formation, of the Department of Cinematography in 1932, which later became the USC School of Cinematic Arts.

=== World War II ===
The onset of World War II led to a transformation of campus life, with a shift in academic programs and student enrollment. Total enrollment fell 15%; military programs were instituted, and by the end of the war 75% of male students were involved in some branch of the military. USC was one of 131 colleges and universities nationally that took part in the V-12 Navy College Training Program, which offered students a path to a Navy commission. After the war ended, enrollment of veterans under the G.I. Bill soared to 24,000 by 1947, straining USC's facilities and resources.

=== Post World War II and Late 20th Century ===
The school expanded again, founding the School of Dramatic Arts in 1945, the Annenberg School for Communication and Journalism, and the Davis School of Gerontology in 1975.

The university joined the Association of American Universities in 1969.

USC hosted a variety of venues for the 1984 Summer Olympics, including parts of the Olympic village. 36 Trojans competed in the 1984 Summer Olympics, winning a total of 22 medals, 9 of which were gold.

=== Rise of the Internet ===
USC helped develop a variety of technologies that assisted in the development of the internet. The USC Information Sciences Institute was founded in 1972, and contributed to the growth and development of the internet. The Information Sciences Institute became one of the earliest nodes on ARPANET, the predecessor to the Internet, and in 1977 figured prominently in a demonstration of its international viability. While part of the ISI, researcher Paul Mockapetris developed the now-familiar Domain Name System characterized by .com, .org, .net, .gov, and .edu on which the Net still operates. (The names .com, .org et al. were invented at SRI International, an ongoing collaborator.)

== 21st century ==
By 2017 USC was responsible for $8 billion in economic output in Los Angeles County; USC students spend $563 million yearly in the local economy, and visitors to the campus add another $37.9 million.

Recognizing that China–United States relations would play a great role in shaping the 21st century, in 2006, USC established the USC U.S.-China Institute (USCI). Known for its conferences, speakers series, training programs, publications, and documentaries, USCI works to inform public discussion with policy-relevant research and timely programming. It publishes US-China Today and is widely known for its twelve-part Assignment:China documentary series on how China has been covered by American journalists since the 1940s. In 2010, the U.S. government and the USA Pavilion organizers asked USCI to manage the recruitment, selection, training and supervision of the students selected to staff the pavilion at the Shanghai Expo.

The university underwent several expansions to its programs throughout the 21st century. In 2001, USC's famous School of Cinematic Arts school added an Interactive Media Division studying stereoscopic cinema, panoramic cinema, immersive cinema, interactive cinema, video games, virtual reality, and mobile media. In September 2006, George Lucas donated $175 million to expand the film school.

In 2004 Qualcomm founder Andrew Viterbi made a $52 million donation to the university's School of Engineering.

In 2013, the university opened the USC Jimmy Iovine and Andre Young Academy after a $70 million donation from Beats Electronics founders Jimmy Iovine and Andrew Young. The academy is also home to the Iovine and Young Hall, intended "for instruction, design and fabrication, conversation and collaboration, and chance meetings that spark inspiration." The Hall is home to a fabrication lab for materials and electronics, a multimedia lab, an adaptive studio/lecture classrooms, an alumni incubator for Academy student-founded companies, and a podcast booth.

In 2015, the university opened the Kaufman School of Dance.

In 2017 the University Village, located on the north side of Jefferson Boulevard between Hoover Street and McClintock Avenue, opened with a five-floor dorm complex, along with a Target store and a Trader Joe's Market on the first floor, was completed as part of the campus expansion.

=== Legal issues ===
USC became embroiled in a series of legal matters in the 2010s. On May 1, 2014, USC was named as one of many higher-education institutions under investigation by the Office of Civil Rights for potential Title IX violations by Barack Obama's White House Task Force to Protect Students from Sexual Assault. USC is also under a concurrent Title IX investigation for potential antimale bias in disciplinary proceedings, as well as denial of counseling resources to male students, as of 8 March 2016. In 2018, USC was ordered to pay $111,965 in legal fees to a male student accused of rape after the Title IX investigation run by Gretchen Means Gaspari was deemed unfair. In 2020, USC was penalized for its faulty Title IX processes by the U.S. Department of Education's Office for Civil Rights.

In 2017, the university came into the national spotlight when the Los Angeles Times published information about Carmen A. Puliafito, the dean of USC's medical school. After accusations of drug use, he resigned from his position as dean in 2016 and was fired from the school the following year after the news stories were published. His medical license was subsequently suspended pending a decision whether it should be terminated. On August 17, 2018, his license G 88200 in the State of California was revoked based on discipline orders. In 2019, USC lost accreditation for their joint-run fellowship program in cardiovascular disease.

To replace Puliafito, USC named Rohit Varma as dean of Keck School of Medicine of USC, but in 2017, Varma resigned after it came to light that USC had disciplined him for inappropriate behavior 15 years earlier.

The following year, the Los Angeles Times broke another story about USC focusing on George Tyndall, a gynecologist accused of abusing 52 patients at USC. The reports span from 1990 to 2016, and include using racist and sexual language, conducting exams without gloves, and taking pictures of his patients' genitals. Inside Higher Ed noted that "other incidents in which the university is perceived to have failed to act on misconduct by powerful officials" have occurred, when it reported that the university's president, C. L. Max Nikias, was resigning. Tyndall was fired in 2017 after reaching a settlement with the university. The school did not report him to state medical authorities or law enforcement at the time, though the LAPD is now investigating Tyndall. As of June 1, 2018, 401 people had contacted a special hotline to receive complaints about the doctor. On October 18, nearly 100 women were reported to have filed new lawsuits against the university, bringing the number of accusations up to over 500 current and former students. USC agreed to pay $215 million as a settlement after hundreds of women claimed the school did not address their complaints. In 2020, Nikias reportedly received $7.6 million as an exit package, including $194,000 for his wife, Niki Nikias, as "first lady". On March 25, 2021, USC and a group of 710 women suing the university announced that they had reached an $852 million settlement, the largest sexual abuse settlement against any university. This brought the total value of the Tyndall settlements to over $1.1 billion.

In 2018, Dennis Kelly resigned as men's health physician at USC after almost 20 years. The following year, he was accused by six male graduate students of inappropriate conduct. By 2020, 49 accusations of misconduct had been made against Dr. Kelly, all by gay or bisexual students and former students.

USC was one of several universities involved in the 2019 college admissions bribery scandal. On March 12, 2019, three coaches and one athletic director were charged with having accepted bribes from wealthy families in return for fraudulently facilitating their children's admission to USC. Among the 12 university personnel charged for their involvement in the scandal nationwide, four were associated with USC.

In 2018, an assistant professor in the Suzanne Dworak-Peck School of Social Work, Erick Guerrero, resigned due to allegations of an affair with a student. In 2018, USC Suzanne Dworak-Peck School of Social Work Dean Marilyn L. Flynn moved to a "new role" after allegations of inappropriate financial transactions. In 2019, Interim President Wanda Austin fired USC Marshall School of Business Dean James Ellis for the large number of complaints about harassment in his 12 years as dean. In 2020, USC School of Dramatic Arts Dean David Bridel resigned after admitting to an affair with an undergraduate.

In 2020, the head of the Title IX Office, Gretchen Means Gaspari, left USC after a whistleblower suit was filed alleging that USC had been involved in "the systematic destruction of investigative records, including the deletion of a 'preservation file' related to George Tyndall". Means Gaspari was also accused of "retaliating against the attorney for reporting that her own husband, John Gaspari, was convicted of misusing graphic photographs involving another woman". John Gaspari was the executive director of USC's Center for Work and Family Life from 2000 to 2018, and he received the President's Award for Staff Achievement from Nikias in 2013. He was "convicted of misusing graphic photographs involving another woman" and fired from USC in 2018.
