= John Strother Griffin =

American physician

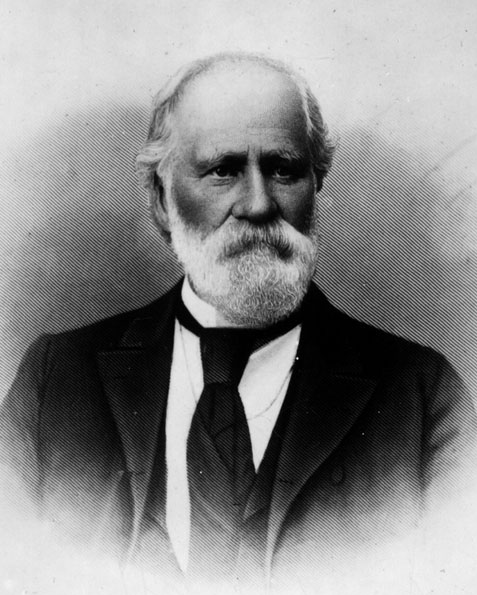
Undated portrait

John Strother Griffin (1816–1898) was an American surgeon attached to General Stephen W. Kearney's expedition from New Mexico to California, and later a founder of and prominent landowner in East Los Angeles, as well as a member of the Common Council of the city of Los Angeles, where he was one of the first university-trained physicians to settle.

== Family ==
John Strother Griffin was born in Fincastle, Virginia, on June 25, 1816, to John Caswell Griffin and Mary Talbot Hancock, both of Virginia. He had five siblings: George Hancock, William Preston, Julia Elizabeth, Caroline Margaret and Elizabeth Croghan. He was a nephew of William Clark of the Lewis and Clark Expedition, and later a brother-in-law of Confederate General Albert Sidney Johnston. His father died when he was seven and his mother when he was nine. Griffin was then brought up by a maternal uncle, George Hancock, in Louisville, Kentucky, and given a "classical education".

He was married about 1856 to Louisa M. E. Hayes or Hays of Baltimore, who died in 1888, ten years before Griffin's own death on August 23, 1898. Griffin died in his Eastside Los Angeles home at 1109 Downey Ave., where he lived with his nephew and niece, Mr. and Mrs. Hancock M. Johnston, and their children. Funeral services were conducted in the home and at the gravesite in Evergreen Cemetery by Joseph Widney. Pallbearers were J. M. Griffith, Harris Newmark, S. Lazard, Reginaldo Del Valle, Major Ben Truman and James Craig. Besides the Johnsons, he was survived by two nieces, Mrs. George J. Denis and Mrs. William B. Pritchard.

== Education ==
Griffin attended the University of Pennsylvania, where he received a medical degree in 1837. At that time the university listed his "place of origin" as "Kentucky".

== Career ==
=== Military ===
In 1840, Griffin was appointed assistant surgeon in the Army and served under General William J. Worth in Florida and, with the rank of captain, on the southwestern frontier at Fort Gibson. Griffin came to California for the first time as part of the Army of the West under General Stephen W. Kearney on the trek from New Mexico in 1846. He was stationed in San Diego and in Los Angeles in charge of the military hospitals, visited the California Gold Country during the 1849 gold rush, and was stationed in Benicia until 1852. In that period he served as part of an expedition against the Yuma Indians on the Colorado River. He was assigned to Washington, D.C., in 1853 and resigned from the service in 1854.

In 1944, the California Historical Society published Griffin's diary relating his wartime experiences under the title A Doctor Comes to California — The Diary of John S. Griffin, M.D., 1846–1847.

Doctor Griffin's story concerns the hardships endured by General Kearney's small force as it crossed the unknown and trackless deserts, and it recounts what took place in the battles of San Pascual, San Gabriel, La Mesa and Los Angeles, and reveals his methods of treatment for wounds and diseases afflicting the soldiers in his charge. The narrative is most interesting.

=== Civilian ===
==== Medicine ====
Before joining the Army, Griffin practiced for three years in Louisville, Kentucky, and returned to Los Angeles after he left the service. In Griffin's obituary, the Los Angeles Times noted that:

Physicians were scarce in those days, and a man with a university education and seventeen years' experience as army surgeon and general pratictioner was instantly welcomed and called to minister to the ailments of all the best people around. Like a circuit rider he journeyed up and down Southern California to answer to the calls of American settlers and Spanish patrons.

Griffin is said to have been the "second pioneer educated physician to arrive in Los Angeles", the first being Richard Den, who arrived there in 1843.

One of his staff was Bridget "Biddy" Mason, who worked for him as a midwife and nurse, becoming known for her herbal remedies. She earned $2.50 a day, considered a good wage for African-American women at that time. In 1856, Mason had been declared a person "free forever" in a successful suit she filed as a slave brought from slave-holding Texas into the free state of California in 1851. The judge rendering the decision was Benjamin Hayes, the brother of Griffin's wife.

==== James King of William ====
Griffin was summoned all the way to San Francisco to advise doctors on the treatment of James King of William, the editor of the San Francisco Evening Bulletin, who was shot at close range on May 14, 1856, by James P. Casey, whom King had publicly identified in his newspaper as having had a criminal record in New York.

Medical historian John Long Wilson wrote that King, who was active during the San Francisco Committee of Vigilance era:

dared to expose scoundrels in both public and private domains; and by relentlessly pursuing a campaign against them, he changed the course of history in the beleaguered city. It is of special interest to us that the violence erupting as a result of his biting editorials had extraordinary medical dimensions.

Doctors who first treated King had inserted a sponge into the bullet wound to stanch the bleeding and were debating whether to remove it in order to fight a severe infection that had arisen. After examining King on May 18, Griffin advised against the removal, fearing hemorrhage from a severed subclavian artery. King died on May 20. Casey was soon executed after a "trial" arranged by the Vigilance Committee.

Wilson opined that:

Dr. Griffin's conspicuous army service in Southern California combined with his sterling personal qualities no doubt contributed to his rapid rise to leadership in civic and business affairs in Los Angeles, and to his acquisition of a large surgical practice within a few years. Although memorial statements about his career say that he sought new treatments and was not hesitant to discard old methods, we have no specifics as to the meaning of these generalities and we have no information about his experience with vascular surgery. In any case, we know that he sided with ... [his] timid colleagues and advised against removing the sponge. Assuming that it was not already too late to make a difference, we must conclude that it was Griffin's opinion that sealed the fate of James King of William.

Nevertheless, a coroner's jury returned a verdict of "no medical malpractice", stating that King would have died of the wound regardless of the sponge.

==== Smallpox epidemic ====
In return for his work in stemming a smallpox epidemic, the city of Los Angeles awarded Griffin a plot of land on what was called the "Enchanted Hill" where Lincoln High School was later built (now 3501 North Broadway).

==== Real estate and politics ====
Griffin was called "the father of East Los Angeles" and was said to have created the first suburb of the city of Los Angeles in Lincoln Heights after he purchased 2,000 acres of ranchland for $1,000 and in 1870, with his nephew Hancock Johnson, erected houses on the site. That land was a rancho called La Rosa de Castilla, on the east side of the Los Angeles River, taking in the deserted hills between Los Angeles and Pasadena — what is today the Eastside neighborhood of the city of Los Angeles. In late 1874 the two men offered an additional thirty-five acres, divided into 65x165-foot lots, for $150 each. They planned the laying out of streets and gifted East Side Park (present-day Lincoln Park) to the city of Los Angeles.

Griffin undertook many business deals in early Los Angeles with landowner and politician Benjamin Davis Wilson, including railways, oil exploration, real estate, farming and ranching, and in 1863 they bought Rancho San Pascual — which encompassed the present-day cities of Pasadena, Altadena, South Pasadena, Alhambra, San Marino and San Gabriel — and diverted water from the Arroyo Seco to the dry mesa via an aqueduct called the "Wilson Ditch".

He was one of the incorporators of the Los Angeles City Water Company and the Farmers and Merchants Bank.

Los Angeles historian H.D. Barrows wrote in 1898 that:

When this city and section were terrorized by an organized banditti which killed Sheriff James R. Barton and party in January 1857, and the city was placed under quasi martial law, Dr. Griffin by general consent was placed at the head of the semi-military defensive organization of our citizens.

A Democrat, Griffin was a member of the Los Angeles Common Council from May 1858 to May 1859.

== Legacy ==
Griffin Avenue in Montecito Heights and Lincoln Heights is named for him.
