= Statue of Albert Sidney Johnston =

Statue of Albert Sidney Johnston may refer to:

- Statue of Albert Sidney Johnston (Texas State Cemetery)
- Statue of Albert Sidney Johnston (University of Texas at Austin)
