= Albert Sidney Johnston =

Confederate States Army officer (1803–1862)

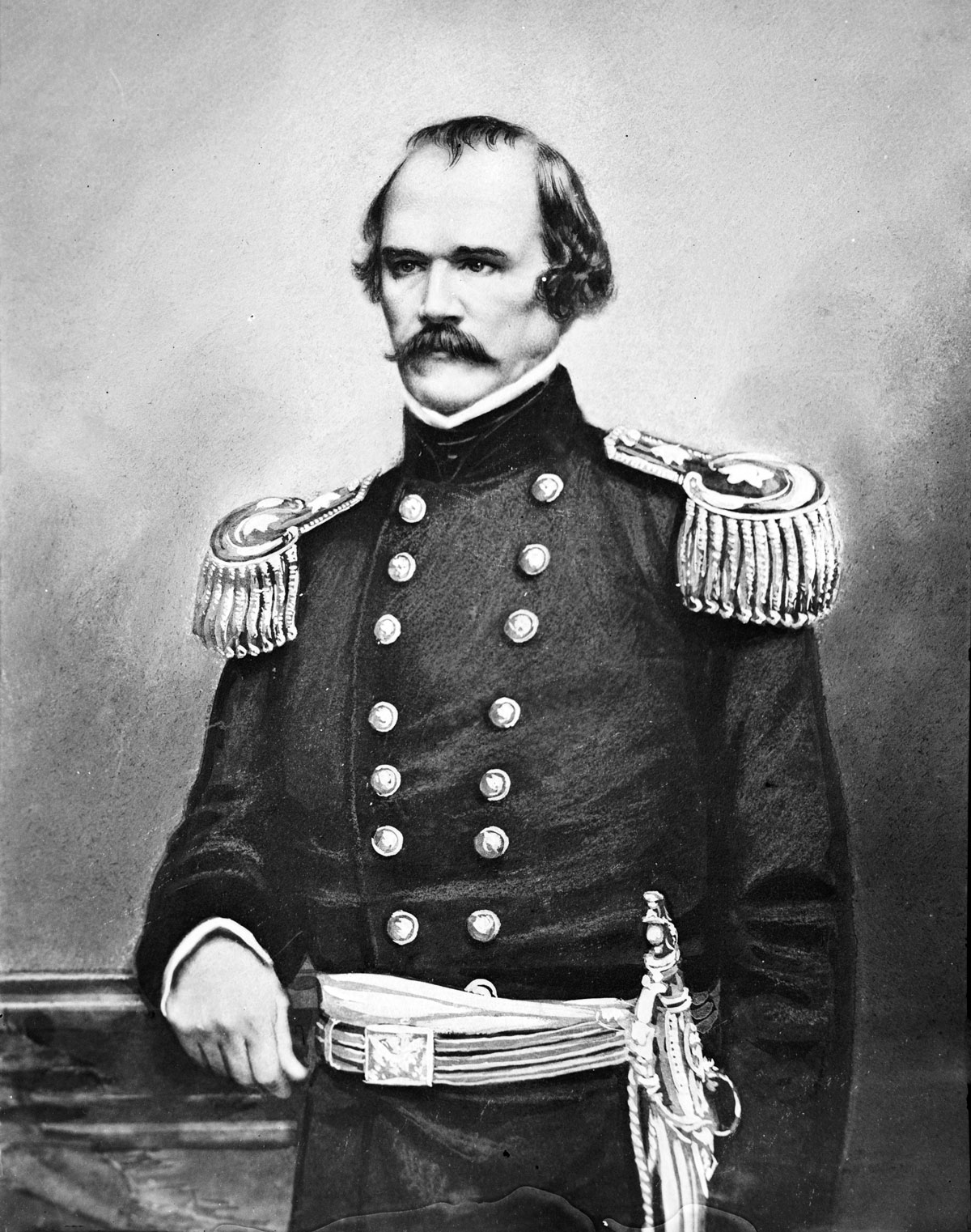
- Johnston in uniform, c. 1861
- Born: February 2, 1803; Washington, Kentucky, U.S.
- Died: April 6, 1862 (aged 59); Shiloh, Tennessee, U.S.
- Burial place: Texas State Cemetery
- Military career
- Allegiance: United States; Republic of Texas; Confederate States
- Branch: United States Army; Texian Army; Confederate States Army
- Service years: 1826–1834; 1846–1861 (U.S.); 1836–1840 (Tex.); 1861–1862 (C.S.)
- Rank: Brevet Brigadier General (U.S.); Senior Brigadier General (Tex.); General (C.S.)
- Nickname: Sidney
- Units: 2nd Infantry Regiment; 6th Infantry Regiment; Los Angeles Mounted Rifles
- Commands: 1st Texas Rifles; 2nd Cavalry Regiment; Department of the Pacific; Army of Central Kentucky; Army of Mississippi Department No. 2
- Conflicts: Black Hawk War; Texas-Indian Wars; Battle of the Neches; Mexican–American War; Battle of Monterrey; Utah War; American Civil War; Battle of Shiloh †
- Awards: Texas Military Hall of Honor

General Albert Sidney Johnston (February 2, 1803 – April 6, 1862) was a U.S. military officer who served as a general officer in three different armies: the Texas Army, the United States Army, and the Confederate States Army. He saw extensive combat during his 34-year military career, fighting actions in the Black Hawk War, the Texas-Indian Wars, the U.S.-Mexican War, the Utah War, and the American Civil War, where he died on the battlefield.

Considered by Confederate States President Jefferson Davis to be the finest general officer in the Confederacy before the later emergence of Robert E. Lee, he was killed early in the Civil War at the Battle of Shiloh on April 6, 1862. Johnston was the highest-ranking officer on either side killed during the war. Davis believed the loss of General Johnston "was the turning point of our fate."

Joseph E. Johnston, a distinguished Confederate general who was not related, assumed command in the Western Theater in November 1862, several months subsequent to A.S. Johnston's passing.

== Early life and education ==
Johnston was born in Washington, Kentucky, the youngest son of Dr. John and Abigail (Harris) Johnston. His father was a native of Salisbury, Connecticut. He was a grandson of Revolutionary War patriot Edward Harris. Although Albert Johnston was born in Kentucky, he lived much of his life in Texas, which he considered his home. Three of his half-brothers, Darius, Orramel, and the lawyer Josiah Stoddard Johnston, had assisted with recruitment but did not join, participated in the Gutiérrez–Magee Expedition in Texas during the period of Spanish administration. Josiah who served in the Louisiana territorial legislature and later the U.S. Congress. He acted as a mentor to A.S Johnston, using his political influence to secure his half-brother's appointment to the U.S. Military Academy at West Point. He was first educated at Transylvania University in Lexington, Kentucky, where he met fellow student Jefferson Davis. Both were appointed to the United States Military Academy at West Point, New York, though Davis was two years behind Johnston. In 1826, Johnston graduated eighth of 41 cadets in his class from West Point with a commission as a brevet second lieutenant in the 2nd U.S. Infantry.

Johnston was assigned to New York and Missouri posts. In August 1827, he participated in the expedition to capture Red Bird, the rebellious Winnebago chief. Johnston later wrote: "I must confess that I consider Red Bird one of the noblest and most dignified men I ever saw... He said: 'I have offended. I sacrifice myself to save my country.'" Johnston served in the brief Black Hawk War of 1832 as chief of staff to Brevet Brigadier General Henry Atkinson. The commander praised Johnston for "talents of the first order, a gallant soldier by profession and education and a gentleman of high standing and integrity."

In April 1834, Johnston resigned from the United States Army to care for his wife, who had contracted tuberculosis. They moved back to Kentucky, but she died in August 1835. Johnston was then approached by an agent from the Republic of Texas, who requested his aid in the defense of the country from invasion by the Republic of Mexico. Johnston agreed, and leaving his two children in the care of relatives in Kentucky, traveled south.

== Texian Army ==
Johnston moved to Texas in 1836 and enlisted as a private in the Texian Army after the Texas War of Independence from the Republic of Mexico. He was named Adjutant General as a colonel in the Republic of Texas Army on August 5, 1836. On January 31, 1837, he became senior brigadier general in command of the Texas Army.

On February 5, 1837, Johnston fought in a duel with Texas Brigadier General Felix Huston, who was angered and offended by Johnston's promotion. Huston had been the acting commander of the army and perceived Johnston's appointment as a slight from the Texas government. Johnston was shot through the hip and severely wounded, requiring him to relinquish his post during his recovery.

Afterward, Johnston said he fought Huston "as a public duty... he had little respect for the practice of dueling." He believed that the "safety of the republic depended upon the efficiency of the army... and upon the good discipline and subordination of the troops, which could only be secured by their obedience to their legal commander. General Huston embodied the lawless spirit in the army, which had to be met and controlled at whatever personal peril."

Many years later, Huston said that the duel was "a shameful piece of business, and I wouldn't do it again under any circumstances... Why, when I reflect upon the circumstances, I hate myself... that one act blackened all the good ones of my life. But I couldn't challenge Congress; and President Houston, although a duelist, was too far above me in rank. Well, thank God I didn't kill him."

On December 22, 1838, Mirabeau B. Lamar, the second president of the Republic of Texas, appointed Johnston as Secretary of War. He defended the Texas border against Mexican invasion. In 1839, he campaigned against Native Americans in northern Texas during the Cherokee War of 1838–39. At the Battle of the Neches, Johnston and Vice President David G. Burnet were both cited in the commander's report "for active exertions on the field" and "having behaved in such a manner as reflects great credit upon themselves."

In February 1840, Johnston resigned his position as Secretary of War and returned to Kentucky, marrying for the second time. He purchased a large plantation in Brazoria County, Texas, named "China Grove." He leased the property out and moved his family to Galveston.

== United States Army ==
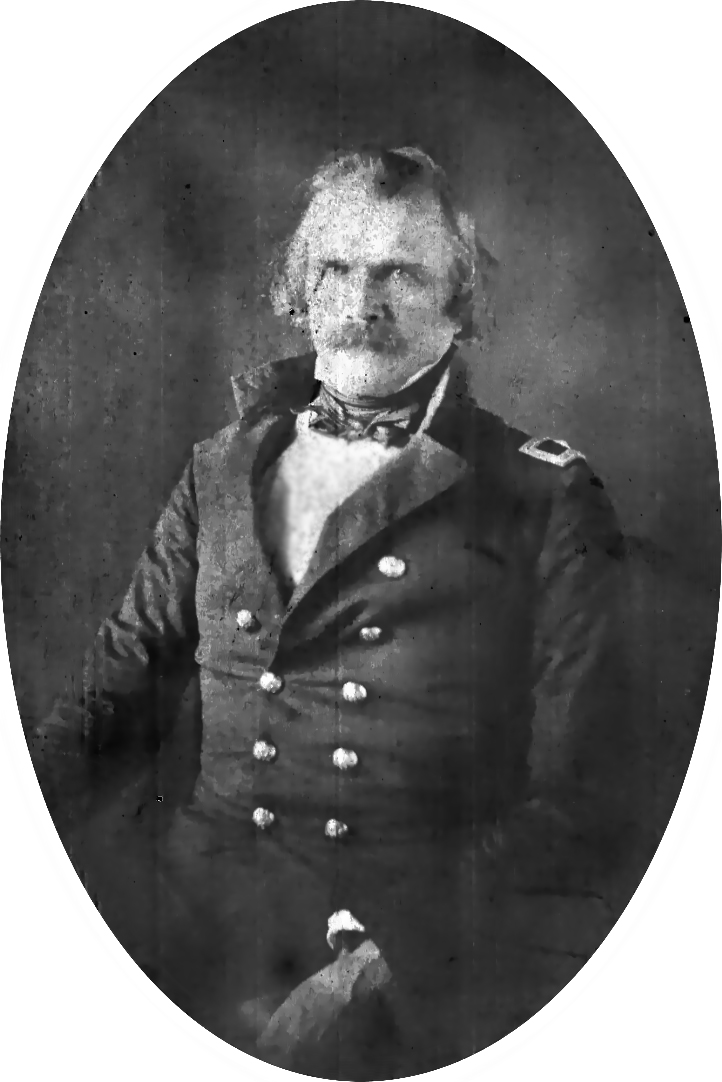
Johnston as commander of the Department of Utah. Portrait taken by Samuel C. Mills at Camp Floyd, Utah Territory, winter of 1858–59

When the United States declared war on Mexico in May 1846, Johnston rode 400 miles from his home in Galveston to Port Isabel to volunteer for service in Brigadier General Zachary Taylor's Army of Occupation. Johnston was elected as colonel of the 1st Texas Rifle Volunteers but the enlistments of his soldiers ran out just before the army's advance on Monterrey, so Taylor appointed him as the inspector general of Brigadier General William O. Butler's division of volunteers. Johnston convinced a few volunteers of his former regiment to stay on and fight.

During the Battle of Monterrey, Butler was wounded and carried to the rear, and Johnston assumed an active leadership role in the division. Future U.S. general, Joseph Hooker, was with Johnston at Monterrey and wrote: "It was through [Johnston's] agency, mainly, that our division was saved from a cruel slaughter... The coolness and magnificent presence [that he] displayed on this field... left an impression on my mind that I have never forgotten." General Taylor considered Johnston "the best soldier he had ever commanded."

Johnston resigned from the army just after the battle of Monterrey in October 1846. He had promised his wife, Eliza, that he would only volunteer for six months' service. In addition, President James K. Polk's administration's preference for officers associated with the Democratic Party prevented the promotion of those, such as Johnston, who were perceived as Whigs:

Authorized to appoint a large number of officers in the increased military force, raised directly by the United States, an unjust discrimination was made in favor of Democrats... Not one Whig was included, and not one of the Democratic appointees had seen service in the field, or possessed the slightest pretension to military education. Such able graduates of West Point as Henry Clay, jun., and William R. McKee, were compelled to seek service through State appointments in volunteer regiments, while Albert Sidney Johnston, subsequently proved to be one of the ablest commanders ever sent from the Military Academy, could not obtain a commission from the General Government. In the war between Mexico and Texas, by which the latter had secured its independence, Johnston had held high command, and was perhaps the best equipped soldier, both by education and service, to be found in the entire country outside the regular army at the time of the Mexican war. General Taylor urged the President to give Johnston command of one of the ten new regiments. Johnston took no part in politics; but his eminent brother, Josiah Stoddard Johnston, long a senator from Louisiana, was Mr. Clay's most intimate friend in public life, and General Taylor's letter was not even answered.

He remained on his plantation after the war until he was appointed by later 12th president Zachary Taylor to the U.S. Army as a major and was made a paymaster in December 1849 for a district of Texas encompassing the military posts from the upper Colorado River to the upper Trinity River. He served in that role for more than five years, making six tours and traveling more than 4,000 miles (6,400 km) annually on the Indian frontier of Texas. He served on the Texas frontier at Fort Mason and elsewhere in the western United States.

In 1855, 14th president Franklin Pierce appointed him colonel of the new 2nd U.S. Cavalry (the unit that preceded the modern 5th U.S.), a new regiment, which he organized, his lieutenant colonel being Robert E. Lee, and his majors William J. Hardee and George H. Thomas. Other subordinates in this unit included Earl Van Dorn, Edmund Kirby Smith, Nathan G. Evans, Innis N. Palmer, George Stoneman, R.W. Johnson, John B. Hood, and Charles W. Field, all future Civil War generals. On March 31, 1856, Johnston received a promotion to temporary command of the entire Department of Texas. He campaigned aggressively against the Comanche, writing to his daughter that "the Indians harass our frontiers and the 2nd Cavalry and other troops thrash them wherever they catch them." In March 1857, Brigadier General David E. Twiggs was appointed permanent commander of the department and Johnston returned to his position as colonel of the 2nd Cavalry.

=== Utah War ===
As a key figure in the Utah War, Johnston took command of the U.S. forces dispatched to crush the supposed Latter Day Saint rebellion in November 1857. Their objective was to install Alfred Cumming as governor of the Utah Territory, replacing Brigham Young, and restore U.S. legal authority in the region. As Johnston had replaced Brigadier General William S. Harney in command, he only joined the army after it had already departed for Utah. Johnston's adjutant general, and future U.S. general in the Civil War, Major Fitz John Porter wrote: "Experienced on the Plains and of established reputation for energy, courage, and resources, [Johnston's] presence restored confidence at all points, and encouraged the weak-hearted and panic-stricken multitude. The long chain of wagons, kinked, tangled, and hard to move, uncoiled and went forward smoothly."

Johnston worked tirelessly over the next few months to maintain the effectiveness of his army in the harsh winter environment at Fort Bridger, Wyoming. Major Porter wrote to an associate: "Col. Johnston has done everything to add to the efficiency of the command – and put it in a condition to sustain the dignity and honor of the country – More he cannot do… Don't let any one come here over Col. Johnston – It would be much against the wishes and hopes of everyone here – who would gladly see him a Brigadier General." Even the Mormons commended Johnston's actions, with the Salt Lake City Deseret News reporting that "It takes a cool brain and good judgment to maintain a contented army and healthy camp through a stormy winter in the Wasatch Mountains."

Johnston and his troops hoped for war. They had learned of the Mountain Meadows Massacre and wanted revenge against the Mormons. However, a peaceful resolution was reached after the army had endured the harsh winter at Fort Bridger. In late June 1858, Johnston led the army through Salt Lake City without incident to establish Camp Floyd some 50 miles distant. In a report to the War Department, Johnston reported that "horrible crimes… have been perpetrated in this territory, crimes of a magnitude and of an apparently studied refinement in atrocity, hardly to be conceived of, and which have gone unwhipped of justice." Nevertheless, Johnston's army peacefully occupied the Utah Territory. U.S. Army Commander-in-Chief, Major General Winfield Scott, was delighted with Johnston's performance during the campaign and recommended his promotion to brevet brigadier general: "Colonel Johns[t]on is more than a good officer – he is a God send to the country thro' the army." The Senate confirmed Johnston's promotion on March 24, 1858.

Although disappointed to have never been given the opportunity to put the Mormons to the sword, Johnston’s time in the Utah Territory was profitable. His soldiers provided protection to emigrant wagon trains heading to California and Oregon and his officers discovered more efficient routes traversing the region. In the summer of 1859, Johnston provided carers, wagons, and an armed escort for eighteen children discovered to have survived the Mountain Meadows Massacre for their journey back to the east.

=== Relationship with Native Americans ===
While serving in the Utah Territory, Major Porter reported that "Colonel Johnston took every occasion to bring the Indians within knowledge and influence of the army, and induced numerous chiefs to come to his camp... Colonel Johnston was ever kind, but firm, and dignified to them... The Utes, Pi-Utes, Bannocks, and other tribes, visited Colonel Johnston, and all went away expressing themselves pleased, assuring him that so long as he remained they would prove his friends, which the colonel told them would be best for them. Thus he effectively destroyed all influence of the Mormons over them, and insured friendly treatment to travelers to and from California and Oregon."

In August 1859, parts of Johnston's Army of Utah were implicated as participants in an alleged massacre at Spring Valley, a retaliation against an Indian massacre of an emigrant train to California. There are conflicting reports of the event and Johnston only referenced it in a November 1859 report to Gen. Scott. He wrote: "I have ascertained that three [emigrant] parties were robbed, and ten or twelve of their members, comprising men, women, and children, murdered... The perpetrators of the robbery of the first party were severely chastised by a detachment of dragoons, under the command of Lieutenant Gay. The troops failed to discover the robbers of the last two parties that were attacked. They are supposed to be vagabonds from the Shoshonee (sic) or Snake and Bannack (sic) Indians, whose chiefs deny any complicity with these predatory bands. There is abundant evidence to prove that these robber bands are accompanied by white men, and probably instigated and led by them. On that account I am inclined to believe the disclaimer of the Indians referred to, of having any knowledge of the robberies or any share in the plunder." The only conflicting report of the incident to that of Gen. Johnston and Lieut. Gay was the account of Elijah Nicholas Wilson (written in 1910, about 51 years later) and oral histories.

In late February 1860, Johnston received orders from the War Department recalling him to Washington D.C. to prepare for a new assignment. "In Southern Utah, an Indian chief, to prove his friendship and warn off prowling clansmen, ran on foot for several days beside his wagon, keeping pace with the trot of the mules. General Johnston on parting gave him among other presents, to his extravagant delight, a 'coat of many colors'... a patchwork quilt that had served through the campaign." Johnston spent 1860 in Kentucky until December 21, when he sailed for California to take command of the Department of the Pacific. In the spring of 1861, Johnston dispatched small parties of troops to patrol northern California in response to reports of Native American raids on settlers in the region. He warned his officers that there must be "no indiscriminate slaughter of the guilty with the innocent" and there were no further incidents.

== Views on slavery ==
Johnston's eldest son recalled that "General Johnston's views in regard to slavery were those generally held in the South, where he was born and brought up, and with whose social structure he had been identified... they were the beliefs of eight millions of people..." In 1846, he owned four slaves in Texas. In 1855, having discovered that a slave was stealing from the Army payroll, Johnston refused to have him physically punished and instead sold him for $1,000 to recoup the losses. Johnston explained that "whipping will not restore what is lost and it will not benefit the [culprit], whom a lifetime of kind treatment has failed to make honest." In 1856, he called abolitionism "fanatical, idolatrous, negro worshipping" in a letter to his son, fearing that the abolitionists would incite a slave revolt in the Southern states. Upon moving to California, Johnston sold one slave to his son and freed another, Randolph Hughes, or "Ran", who agreed to accompany the family on the condition of a $12/month contract for five more years of servitude. Ran accompanied Johnston throughout the American Civil War until the latter's death.

== American Civil War ==
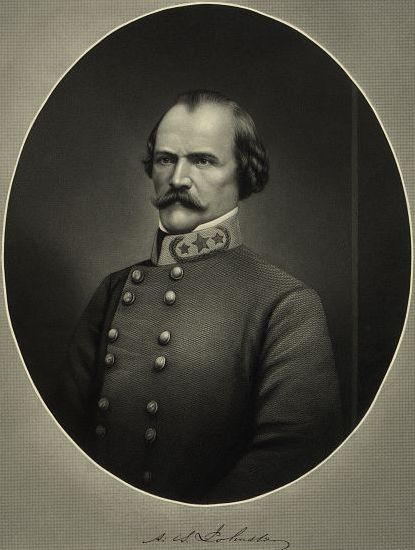
Albert S. Johnston in Confederate Army uniform wearing Three Gold Stars and Wreath on a General's Collar

In the lead up to the American Civil War, rumors began to circulate that Johnston, as a known sympathizer of the southern states, would turn over control of the Federal military installations in San Francisco to clandestine southern paramilitary organizations. So alarmed was the Governor of California, John G. Downey, that he visited Johnston to discuss the allegations. Johnston responded: “I have spent the greater part of my life in the service of my country, and while I hold her commission [I] shall serve her honorably and faithfully. I shall protect her public property, and not a cartridge or a percussion cap belonging to her shall pass to any enemy while I am here as her representative. There is no man in the Union more sorely afflicted than I am at the occurrences now taking place. I have been long identified with Texas, her interests and public men, and her action may control my future destiny. But in any event I shall give due notice and turn over intact my department to my successor." Johnston strengthened the garrisons of all the military assets in San Francisco, transferred 10,000 muskets and their ammunition from the Benicia arsenal to the more secure fortress on Alcatraz Island, and ordered heightened surveillance of all boats and passengers operating in San Francisco Harbor.

A group of Southern sympathizers had plans to separate California and Oregon to establish a 'Pacific Republic,' but this endeavor was unsuccessful, partly because General Johnston declined to participate.

Like many regular army officers from the Southern United States, Johnston opposed secession. Nevertheless, he resigned his commission soon after he heard of the Confederate states' declarations of secession. Following Texas's secession in early 1861, he chose to join the Confederacy as its second-ranking officer, having declined an offer to serve as Winfield Scott's second-in-command on the federal side. The War Department accepted it on May 6, 1861, effective May 3. On April 28, he moved to Los Angeles, the home of his wife's brother John Griffin. Considering staying in California with his wife and children, Johnston remained there until May, but news of the secession of Texas, the shelling of Fort Sumter, and the mobilization of 75,000 Union volunteers to suppress the rebellion compelled Johnston to act. “It seems like fate that Texas has made me a Rebel twice,” he commented to his wife. Johnston enlisted in the Los Angeles Mounted Rifles (a pro-Southern militia unit) as a private, leaving Warner's Ranch on May 27. He participated in their trek across the Southwestern deserts to Texas, crossing the Colorado River into the Confederate Territory of Arizona on July 4, 1861. His escort was commanded by Alonzo Ridley, Undersheriff of Los Angeles, who remained at Johnston's side until he was killed.

On August 31, 1861, President Davis submitted five nominations for the rank of full general to C.S Congress, with seniority dates as follows: Samuel Cooper, effective May 16; Albert Sidney Johnston himself, effective May 30; Robert E. Lee, effective June 14; Joseph E. Johnston, effective July 4; and P. G. T. Beauregard, effective July 21. Joseph Johnston, who had anticipated being ranked first, was placed fourth, behind a presidential associate friendship with Albert Sidney Johnston, an officer whose colonelcy was relatively recent (Lee), and the head of the army's administrative functions (Cooper). The Seniority Crisis of 1861 represented a critical juncture in the Confederate Army's leadership, resulting in a notable estrangement between Jefferson Davis and Joseph E. Johnston. This crisis originated from the decision to rank officers based on their seniority, which positioned Johnston as the fourth among the five full generals. Joe Johnston's formal objection to this decision played a substantial role in the deterioration of command relationships within the Confederate high command.

Early in the Civil War, Confederate President Jefferson Davis decided that the Confederacy would attempt to hold as much territory as possible, distributing military forces around its borders and coasts. In the summer of 1861, Davis appointed several generals to defend Confederate lines from the Mississippi River east to the Allegheny Mountains. Aged 58 when the war began, Johnston was old by Army standards. He came east to offer his service for the Confederacy without having been promised anything, merely hoping for an assignment.

The most sensitive, and in many ways, the most crucial areas, along the Mississippi River and in western Tennessee along the Tennessee and the Cumberland rivers were placed under the command of Maj. Gen. Leonidas Polk and Brig. Gen. Gideon J. Pillow. The latter had initially been in command in Tennessee as that State's top general. Their impolitic occupation of Columbus, Kentucky, on September 3, 1861, two days before Johnston arrived in the Confederacy's capital of Richmond, Virginia, after his cross-country journey, drove Kentucky from its stated neutrality. The majority of Kentuckians allied with the U.S. camp. Polk and Pillow's action gave U.S. Brig. Gen. Ulysses S. Grant an excuse to take control of the strategically located town of Paducah, Kentucky, without raising the ire of most Kentuckians and the pro-U.S. majority in the State legislature.

=== Department No. 2 ===
On September 10, 1861, Johnston was assigned to command the huge area of the Confederacy west of the Allegheny Mountains, except for coastal areas. He became commander of the Confederacy's western armies in the area often called the Western Department or Western Military Department. Johnston's appointment as a full general by his friend and admirer Jefferson Davis had already been confirmed by the Confederate Senate on August 31, 1861. The appointment had been backdated to rank from May 30, 1861, making him the second-highest-ranking general in the Confederate States Army. Only Adjutant General and Inspector General Samuel Cooper ranked ahead of him. After his appointment, Johnston immediately headed for his new territory. He was permitted to call on Arkansas, Tennessee, and Mississippi governors for new troops. However, politics largely stifled this authority, especially concerning Mississippi. On September 13, 1861, Johnston ordered Brig. Gen. Felix Zollicoffer with 4,000 men to occupy Cumberland Gap in Kentucky to block U.S. troops from coming into eastern Tennessee. The Kentucky legislature had voted to side with the United States after the occupation of Columbus by Polk. By September 18, Johnston had Brig. Gen. Simon Bolivar Buckner with another 4,000 men blocking the railroad route to Tennessee at Bowling Green, Kentucky.

Johnston had fewer than 40,000 men spread throughout Kentucky, Tennessee, Arkansas, and Missouri. Of these, 10,000 were in Missouri under Missouri State Guard Maj. Gen. Sterling Price. Johnston did not quickly gain many recruits when he first requested them from the governors, but his more serious problem was lacking sufficient arms and ammunition for the troops he already had. As the Confederate government concentrated efforts on the units in the East, they gave Johnston small numbers of reinforcements and minimal amounts of arms and material. Johnston maintained his defense by conducting raids and other measures to make it appear he had larger forces than he did, a strategy that worked for several months. Johnston's tactics had so annoyed and confused U.S. Brig. Gen. William Tecumseh Sherman in Kentucky that he became paranoid and mentally unstable. In a letter to his wife, Sherman stated: "I find myself riding a whirlwind unable to guide the storm. Rumors and reports pour in on me of the overwhelming force collected in front across Green River... To advance would be madness and to stand still folly... the idea of going down to history with a fame such as threatens me nearly makes me crazy, indeed I may be so now." Sherman overestimated Johnston's forces and was relieved by Brig. Gen. Don Carlos Buell on November 9, 1861. However, in his Memoirs, Sherman strongly rebutted this account.

=== Mill Springs ===
East Tennessee (a heavily pro-union region of the southern U.S. during the Civil War) was occupied for the Confederacy by two unimpressive brigadier generals appointed by Jefferson Davis: Felix Zollicoffer, a brave but untrained and inexperienced officer, and soon-to-be Maj. Gen. George B. Crittenden, a former U.S. Army officer with apparent alcohol problems. While Crittenden was away in Richmond, Zollicoffer moved his forces to the north bank of the upper Cumberland River near Mill Springs (now Nancy, Kentucky), putting the river to his back and his forces into a trap. Zollicoffer decided it was impossible to obey orders to return to the other side of the river because of the scarcity of transport and proximity of U.S. troops. When U.S. Brig. Gen. George H. Thomas moved against the Confederates, Crittenden decided to attack one of the two parts of Thomas's command at Logan's Cross Roads near Mill Springs before the U.S. forces could unite. At the Battle of Mill Springs on January 19, 1862, the ill-prepared Confederates, after a night march in the rain, attacked the U.S. soldiers with some initial success. As the battle progressed, Zollicoffer was killed and the Confederates were turned back and routed by a U.S. bayonet charge, their force of 4,000 suffering 533 casualties, while Crittenden's conduct in the battle was so inept that subordinates accused him of being drunk. The Confederate troops who escaped were assigned to other units as General Crittenden faced an investigation of his conduct.

After the Confederate defeat at Mill Springs, Davis sent Johnston a brigade and a few other scattered reinforcements. He also assigned him Gen. P. G. T. Beauregard, who was supposed to attract recruits because of his victories early in the war and act as a competent subordinate for Johnston. The brigade was led by Brig. Gen. John B. Floyd, a former Governor of Virginia. After Johnston, Beauregard, and Hardee, Floyd was the most senior officer in the Western Department by virtue of his early date of commission as a general. Floyd took command at Fort Donelson as the senior general present just before U.S. Brig. Gen. Ulysses S. Grant attacked the fort. Historians believe the assignment of Beauregard to the west stimulated U.S. commanders to attack the forts before Beauregard could make a difference in the theater. U.S. Army officers heard that he was bringing 15 regiments with him, but this was an exaggeration of his forces.

=== Fort Henry, Fort Donelson, Nashville ===
Based on the assumption that Kentucky neutrality would act as a shield against a direct invasion from the north, circumstances that no longer applied in September 1861, Tennessee initially had sent men to Virginia and concentrated defenses in the Mississippi Valley. Even before Johnston arrived in Tennessee, construction of two forts had been started to defend the Tennessee and the Cumberland rivers, which provided avenues into the State from the north. Both forts were located in Tennessee to respect Kentucky neutrality, but these were not in ideal locations. Fort Henry on the Tennessee River was in an unfavorable low-lying location, commanded by hills on the Kentucky side of the river. Fort Donelson on the Cumberland River, although in a better location, had a vulnerable land side and did not have enough heavy artillery to defend against gunboats.

Maj. Gen. Polk ignored the problems of the forts when he took command in July 1861 because they were not in his jurisdiction. After Johnston took command and included the forts in Polk's area of authority, he at first refused to comply with Johnston's order to send an engineer, Lt. Joseph K. Dixon, to inspect the forts. After Johnston asserted his authority, Polk had to allow Dixon to proceed. Dixon recommended that the forts be maintained and strengthened, although they were not in ideal locations, because much work had been done on them, and the Confederates might not have time to build new ones. Johnston accepted his recommendations. Johnston wanted Major Alexander P. Stewart to command the forts, but President Davis appointed Brig. Gen. Lloyd Tilghman as commander. Alerted by a U.S. reconnaissance on January 14, 1862, Johnston ordered Tilghman to fortify the high ground opposite Fort Henry, which Polk had failed to do despite Johnston's orders. Tilghman failed to act decisively on these orders, which were too late to be adequately carried out in any event. On January 20, 1862, Johnston ordered Floyd, Buckner, and 8,000 troops from Bowling Green to Russellville, Kentucky. Here they could respond to an advance from Buell's Army of the Ohio at South Carrollton, Kentucky, or to an offensive by Grant's forces at Cairo, Illinois, up the Cumberland River.

Gen. Beauregard arrived at Johnston's headquarters at Bowling Green on February 4, 1862, and was given overall command of Polk's force at the western end of Johnston's line at Columbus, Kentucky. Gen. Pillow was assigned to defend Clarksville, Tennessee, with a small force. On February 6, 1862, U.S. gunboats attacked the ill-sited Fort Henry, which had flooded because of the unusually high rainfall in early 1862. Gen. Tilghman sent nearly all of his 3,000-man force to Fort Donelson, and remained at Fort Henry with 94 artillery men to fight it out with the gunboats. Several of the Confederate artillery pieces exploded or were destroyed during the combat and Tilghman was compelled to surrender Fort Henry. At a conference at Covington House in Bowling Green the next day, Johnston, Beauregard, and Hardee decided that the U.S. gunboats were invincible and that Fort Donelson was untenable. Johnston knew he could be trapped at Bowling Green if Fort Donelson fell, so he moved his force to Nashville, the capital of Tennessee and an increasingly important Confederate industrial center, beginning on February 11, 1862.

After deciding that Fort Donelson was untenable on February 7, 1862, Johnston received intelligence from Buckner the next day reporting that Grant's army only numbered 12,000 men. In the next few days, Johnston received information from several officers describing the "considerable damage suffered by the Union ironclads during the battle of Fort Henry." These two pieces of information gave Johnston confidence that Fort Donelson could be defended. On February 12, 1862, Maj. Gen Braxton Bragg informed a subordinate that "General A.S. Johnston, from whom I heard yesterday, feels confident of holding Fort Donelson and driving the enemy from the Tennessee soon." Johnston ordered Gen. Pillow and Gen. Floyd to concentrate their troops at Fort Donelson, confident that the 16,000 Confederate troops could defeat Grant's army and that Fort Donelson's batteries could repel the gunboats. Unfortunately for Johnston, the senior generals sent to the fort to command the enlarged garrison, Floyd, Pillow, and Buckner squandered their chance to achieve victory over Grant's forces when comparably sized, and became despondent when large Union reinforcements arrived on the night of February 13, 1862. After a failed breakout attempt on February 15, 1862, Gen. Buckner, having been abandoned by Floyd and Pillow, surrendered Fort Donelson the next morning. Colonel Nathan Bedford Forrest escaped with his cavalry force of about 700 men before the surrender. The Confederates suffered about 1,500 casualties, with an estimated 12,000 to 14,000 taken prisoner. U.S. casualties were 500 killed, 2,108 wounded, and 224 missing.

Johnston, who had little choice in allowing Floyd and Pillow to take charge at Fort Donelson based on seniority after he ordered them to add their forces to the garrison, took the blame and suffered calls for his removal because a full explanation to the press and public would have exposed the weakness of the Confederate position. His passive defensive performance while positioning himself in a forward position at Bowling Green, spreading his forces too thinly, not concentrating his forces in the face of U.S. advances, and appointing or relying upon inadequate or incompetent subordinates subjected him to criticism at the time and by later historians. However, one Confederate officer observed that when Johnston assumed command in September 1861, he had "found an army of hastily levied volunteers, badly equipped, miserably clad, fully one half stricken down by disease, destitute of transportation, and with barely the shadow of discipline... with these men he held at bay a force of the enemy of fully 100,000 men... The Southern States were protected from invasion. Time was obtained to drill and consolidate the volunteer force. The army was sustained in the fertile and abundant grain-producing regions of Kentucky, transportation gathered of the most efficient character, immense supplies of beef, corn, and pork collected from the surrounding country and safely garnered in depots further South for the coming summer campaign." Johnston had held his position for six months but the fall of the forts exposed Nashville to an imminent attack, and it fell without resistance to U.S. forces under Gen. Buell on February 25, 1862, two days after Johnston had to pull his forces out to avoid having them captured as well.

=== Corinth ===
Johnston was in a perilous situation after the fall of Ft. Donelson and Henry; with barely 17,000 men to face an overwhelming concentration of Union force, he hastily fled south into Mississippi by way of Nashville and then into northern Alabama. Johnston himself retreated with the force under his personal command, the Army of Central Kentucky, from the vicinity of Nashville. With Beauregard's help, Johnston decided to concentrate forces with those formerly under Polk and now already under Beauregard's command at the strategically located railroad crossroads of Corinth, Mississippi, which he reached by a circuitous route. Johnston kept the U.S. forces, now under the overall command of Maj. Gen. Henry Halleck, confused and hesitant to move, allowing Johnston to reach his objective undetected. He scraped together reinforcements from Louisiana, as well as part of Polk's force at Island No. 10, and 10,000 additional troops under Gen. Bragg brought up from Mobile. Bragg at least calmed the nerves of Beauregard and Polk, who had become agitated by their apparent dire situation in the face of numerically superior forces, before Johnston's arrival on March 24, 1862.

Johnston's army of 17,000 men gave the Confederates a combined force of about 40,000 to 44,669 men at Corinth. On March 29, 1862, Johnston officially took command of this combined force, which continued to use the Army of the Mississippi name under which Beauregard had organized it on March 5.

Johnston's only hope was to crush Grant before Buell and others could reinforce him. He started his army in motion on April 3, intent on surprising Grant's force as soon as the next day. It was not an easy undertaking; his army had been hastily thrown together, two-thirds of the soldiers had never fired a shot in battle, and drill, discipline, and staff work were so poor that the different divisions kept stumbling into each other on the march. Beauregard felt that this offensive was a mistake and could not possibly succeed, but Johnston replied "I would fight them if they were a million" as he drove his army on to Pittsburg Landing. His army was finally in position within a mile or two of Grant's force, undetected, by the evening of April 5, 1862.

=== Shiloh ===
Johnston launched a massive surprise attack with his concentrated forces against Grant at the Battle of Shiloh on April 6, 1862. As the Confederate forces overran the U.S. camps, Johnston personally rallied troops up and down the line on his horse. One of his famous moments in the battle occurred when he witnessed some of his soldiers breaking from the ranks to pillage and loot the U.S. camps and was outraged to see a young lieutenant among them. "None of that, sir", Johnston roared at the officer, "we are not here for plunder." Then, realizing he had embarrassed the man, he picked up a tin cup from a table and announced, "Let this be my share of the spoils today", before directing his army onward.

At about 2:30 pm, while leading one of those charges against a U.S. camp near the "Peach Orchard", he was wounded, taking a bullet behind his right knee. The bullet clipped a part of his popliteal artery, and his boot filled up with blood. No medical personnel were on the scene since Johnston had sent his personal surgeon to care for the wounded Confederate troops and U.S. prisoners earlier in the battle.

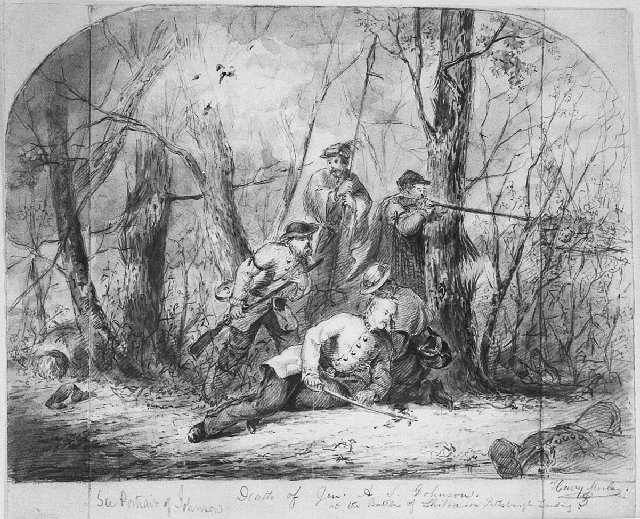
Henry Mosler's drawing of the death of General Johnston

Within a few minutes, Johnston was observed by his staff to be nearly fainting. Among his staff was Isham G. Harris, the Governor of Tennessee, who had ceased to make any real effort to function as governor after learning that Abraham Lincoln had appointed Andrew Johnson as military governor of Tennessee. Seeing Johnston slumping in his saddle and his face turning deathly pale, Harris asked: "General, are you wounded?" Johnston said his last words in a weak voice: "Yes... and I fear seriously." Harris and other staff officers removed Johnston from his horse, carried him to a small ravine near the "Hornets Nest", and desperately tried to aid the general, who had lost consciousness. They could not find the fatal wound and Harris sent an aide to fetch Johnston's surgeon. A few minutes later, Johnston died from blood loss before a doctor could be found. An examination of the case by modern neurosurgeons reported that "based on the description of the completely severed popliteal artery... General Johnston, sitting in the saddle of his horse with his leg extended, would quickly lose consciousness and bleed to death within a few minutes of the injury described by his surgeon." Harris believed that if the tourniquet found in Johnston's pocket had been applied the general could have been saved, but the neurosurgeons stated that "in actual battlefield medical practice, by the time they navigated Johnston on his horse with his leg extended (and bleeding) to a safe place, the blood loss may have already led to his death, even if the wound was immediately identified."

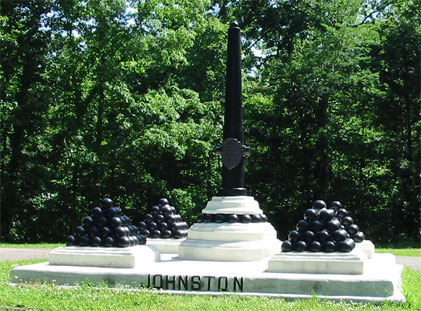
Monument to Johnston at Shiloh National Military Park

Harris and the other officers wrapped General Johnston's body in a blanket to not damage the troops' morale with the sight of the dead general. Johnston and his wounded horse, Fire Eater, were taken to his field headquarters on the Corinth road, where his body remained in his tent for the remainder of the battle. P. G. T. Beauregard assumed command of the army. He resumed leading the Confederate assault, which continued advancing and pushed the U.S. forces back to a final defensive line near the Tennessee river. With his army exhausted and daylight almost gone, Beauregard called off the final Confederate attack around 1900 hours, figuring he could finish off the U.S. army the following morning. However, Grant was reinforced by 20,000 fresh troops from Gen. Buell's Army of the Ohio during the night and led a successful counter-attack the following day, driving the Confederates from the field and winning the battle. As the Confederate army retreated to Corinth, Johnston's body was taken to the home of Colonel William Inge, which had been his headquarters in Corinth. It was covered in the Confederate flag and lay in state for several hours.

It is possible that a Confederate soldier fired the fatal round, as many Confederates were firing at the U.S. lines while Johnston charged well in advance of his soldiers. However, historian Timothy B. Smith noted: "A bullet had entered the back of the leg. This sparked some wild speculation that the general was shot from the rear by one of his own men, despite the fact that a horseman could at any time be facing any direction on a spirited and excited mount that was also in the process of being wounded multiple times." Alonzo Ridley of Los Angeles commanded the bodyguard "the Guides" of Gen. A. S. Johnston and was by his side when he fell. Johnston was the highest-ranking fatality of the war on either side and his death was a strong blow to the morale of the Confederacy. At the time, Davis considered him the best general in the country.

== Personal life ==
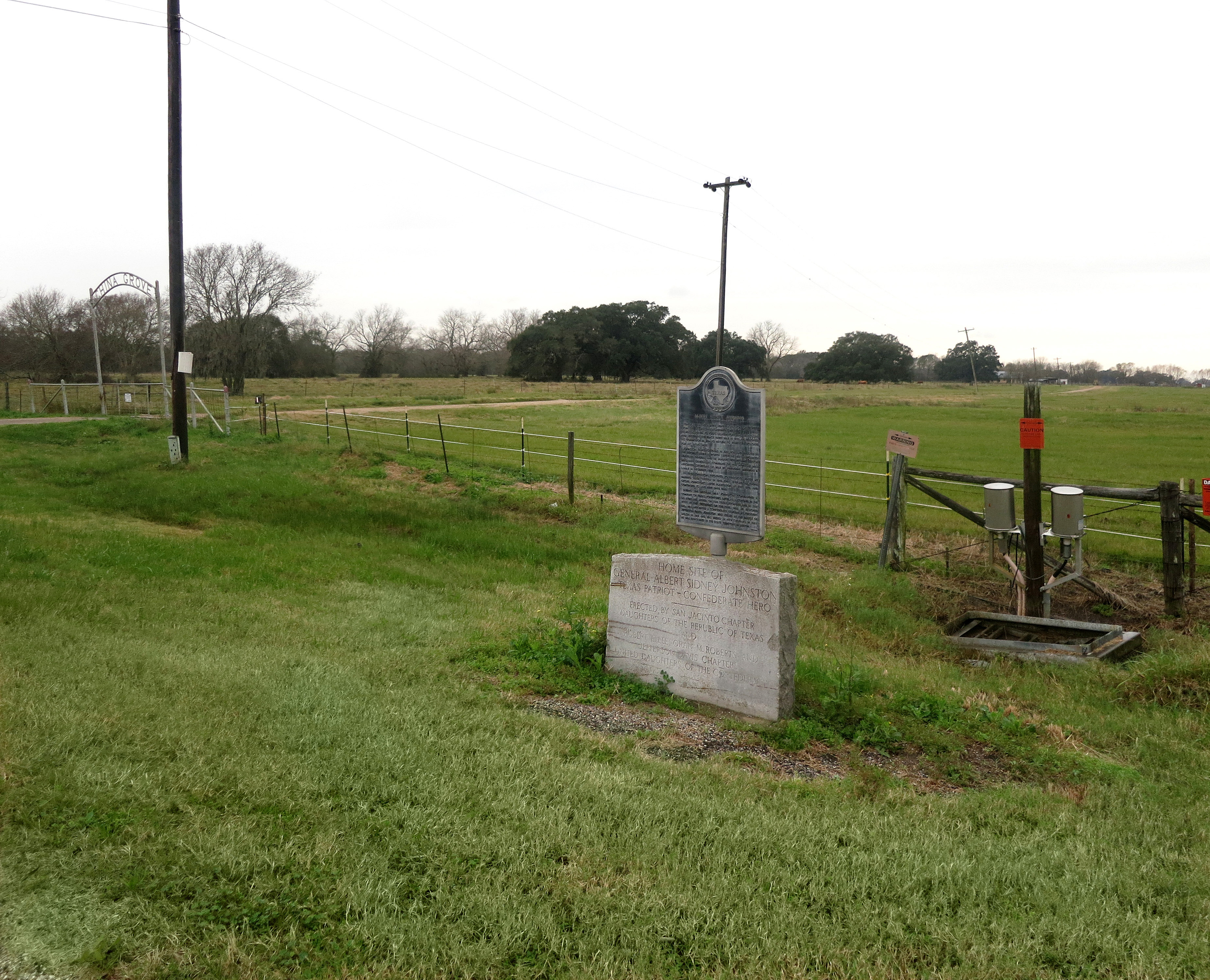
China Grove Plantation, Johnston's Texas home

In 1829, Johnston married Henrietta Preston, sister of Kentucky politician and future Civil War general William Preston. They had three children at Jefferson Barracks, of whom two survived to adulthood. Their son, William Preston Johnston, became a colonel in the Confederate States Army. Their daughter, also named Henrietta Preston, never married. In 1834, the senior Johnston resigned his commission to care for his dying wife in Kentucky, who succumbed two years later to tuberculosis. In 1843, Johnston married Eliza Griffin, his late wife's first cousin. The couple had a son, Albert Sidney Jr., when living in Shelbyville, Kentucky. They had two more children at the China Grove plantation in Texas, of whom one, Hancock McClung, survived to adulthood. A daughter, Margaret Strother, was born in Austin in 1851, followed by a third son, Griffin, in 1857. A sixth child, Eliza Alberta, was born when the family lived in Los Angeles, where they had permanently settled.

== Legacy and honors ==
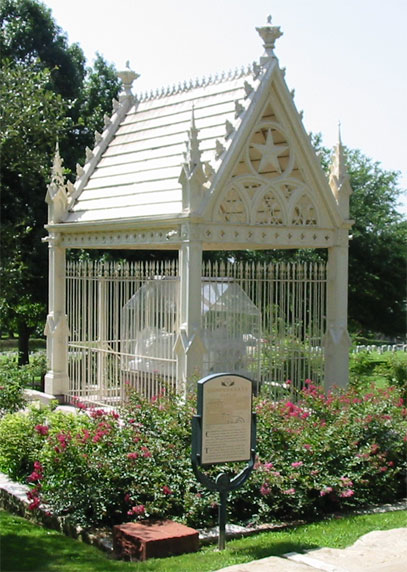
Johnston's tomb and statue by Elisabet Ney in the Texas State Cemetery in Austin, Texas

Contemporary medical professionals suggest that A.S. Johnston's life might have been preserved had a tourniquet been applied above his wound to staunch the bleeding. At the time, battlefield medical understanding was limited, and officers lacked the necessary knowledge and proficiency to utilize a tourniquet effectively. Modern trauma experts, among them is physician Norman McSwain, one of A.S. Johnston's descendants, contend that the timely application of a tourniquet above the arterial injury could have managed the hemorrhage and potentially saved his life. A tourniquet functions by compressing the artery, thereby stopping blood flow beyond the point of application, which prevents fatal blood loss until surgical intervention can be performed.

The suggestion that General Johnston might have emerged as the "Robert E. Lee of the West" appears to be founded more on speculative potential and what historians might have argued if he had survived after hypothetical Confederate victories at Pittsburg Landing. A parallel to Patrick Cleburne being the "Stonewall Jackson of the West."

Johnston was survived by his wife, Eliza, and six children. His wife and five younger children, including one born after he went to war, chose to live out their days at home in Los Angeles with Eliza's brother, Dr. John Strother Griffin. Johnston's eldest son, Albert Sidney Jr. (born in Texas), had already followed him into the Confederate States Army. In 1863, Albert Jr. was on his way out of San Pedro harbor on a ferry after taking home leave in Los Angeles. While a steamer was taking on passengers from the ferry, a wave swamped the smaller boat, causing its boilers to explode. Albert Jr. was killed in the accident.

Upon his passing, General Johnston received the highest praise ever given by the Confederate government: accounts were published on December 20, 1862, and after that, in the Los Angeles Star of his family's hometown. Johnston Street, Hancock Street, and Griffin Avenue, each in northeast Los Angeles, are named after the general and his family, who lived in the neighborhood.

Johnston was initially buried in New Orleans. In 1866, a joint resolution of the Texas Legislature was passed to have his body moved and reinterred at the Texas State Cemetery in Austin. The re-interment occurred in 1867. Forty years later, the state appointed Elisabet Ney to design a monument and sculpture of him to be erected at the grave site, installed in 1905.

The Texas Historical Commission has erected a historical marker near the entrance of what was once Johnston's plantation. An adjacent marker was erected by the San Jacinto Chapter of the Daughters of The Republic of Texas and the Lee, Roberts, and Davis Chapter of the United Daughters of the Confederate States of America.

In 1916, the University of Texas at Austin recognized several confederate veterans (including Johnston) with statues on its South Mall. On August 21, 2017, as part of the wave of confederate monument removals in America, Johnston's statue was taken down. Plans were announced to add it to the Briscoe Center for American History on the east side of the university campus.

Johnston was inducted to the Texas Military Hall of Honor in 1980.

In the fall of 2018, A. S. Johnston Elementary School in Dallas, Texas, was renamed Cedar Crest Elementary. Albert Sidney Johnston High School in Austin, Texas was closed in 2008 due to academic failures and was later repurposed as an academy. Johnston Middle School in Houston, Texas, was also renamed Meyerland Middle School. Three other elementary schools named for Confederate veterans were renamed simultaneously.

== See also ==
- Albert Sidney Johnston High School, a defunct public high school in Austin, Texas
- List of American Civil War generals (Confederate)
- List of Confederate monuments and memorials
- Statue of Albert Sidney Johnston (Texas State Cemetery), a 1903 memorial sculpture by Elisabet Ney
- Statue of Albert Sidney Johnston (University of Texas at Austin), a statue by Pompeo Coppini
