= Senator Maclay =

Senator Maclay may refer to:

- Charles Maclay (1822–1890), California State Senate
- Samuel Maclay (1741–1811), U.S. Senator from Pennsylvania from 1803 to 1809
- William Maclay (Pennsylvania senator) (1737–1804), U.S. Senator from Pennsylvania from 1789 to 1791
