= History of USC =

History of USC may refer to:

- History of the University of South Carolina
- History of the University of Southern California
- History of the United States Congress

== See also ==
- USC (disambiguation)
