= George F. Bovard =

George Finley Bovard (August 8, 1856 – September 24, 1932) was the fourth president of the University of Southern California, serving from 1903 to 1921. Bovard administration building is named after him. His brother, Marion McKinley Bovard, was the university's first president.

Academic offices
Preceded by George W. White	4th President of the University of Southern California; 1903–1921	Succeeded by Rufus B. von KleinSmid
