= Robert Samuel Maclay =

American missionary in East Asia (1824–1907)

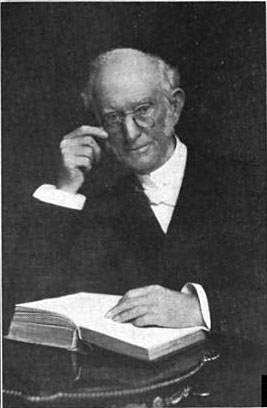
- Missionary to China, Japan and Korea
- Born: February 7, 1824; Concord, Pennsylvania
- Died: August 18, 1907 (aged 83); Los Angeles, California
- Religion: Methodism

Robert Samuel Maclay, D.D. (simplified Chinese: 麦利和; traditional Chinese: 麥利和; Pinyin: Mài Lìhé; Foochow Romanized: Măh Lé-huò; February 7, 1824 - August 18, 1907) was an American missionary who made pioneer contributions to the Methodist Episcopal missions in China, Japan and Korea. He served as the first president of Aoyama Gakuin University.

== Life ==
=== Early life ===
Robert Samuel Maclay was born on February 7, 1824, in Concord, Pennsylvania, one of nine children. His parents, Robert Maclay and Arabella Erwin Maclay, ran a tanning business in the local community. His father, a respected member of the Democratic Party, was raised up in the Presbyterian faith but became actively involved in the Methodist Episcopal Church, dedicating himself to spreading the Gospel, his mother an immigrant from the north of Ireland who shared her husband's religious devotion.

Maclay entered Dickinson College in the fall of 1841 and was elected into the Belles Lettres Society. As a college student he was highly influenced by his professor Rev. John McClintock. He graduated with a Bachelor of Arts degree on July 10, 1845, and at his graduation he presented a commencement speech entitled The Rule and End of Life. Later Maclay received his Master's degree was subsequently honored with a Doctor of Divinity. One year after his graduation, Maclay was ordained in the Baltimore Conference of the Methodist Episcopal Church.

Maclay's ministry within the United States was brief. Throughout the 1840s, many American churches experienced a growing concern for the expansion of mission work overseas, and at that time the Methodist Episcopal Church suffered a split into two conferences due to the controversial issue over slavery. Maclay avoided the internal struggle of the Church and responded to the overseas mission call. On September 10, 1847, he was appointed as a missionary to Fuzhou, China.

=== Life among the Chinese ===
Four hundred millions! Who are they? Our brethren; bone of our bone, flesh of our flesh. What are they? Heathen, athwart whose gloomy night of error no ray of light ever shines; idolaters, bowing down to senseless images, the workmanship of their own hands. What are they? Men, created by God; fallen, ruined, helpless; victims, morally, of a foul and relentless malady; sinking into guilt and woe unutterable, inconceivable; immortals, objects of the divine compassion, subjects of Christ's mediation, into the mysteries of whose redemption angels desire to look, and for whose eternal salvation all heavenly intelligences are moved with a profound and ceaseless solicitude.

— R.S. Maclay, Life Among the Chinese, Chapter I. General View of China

On October 12, 1847, Maclay, together with another Methodist missionary Rev. Henry Hickok, boarded the "Paul Jones" and set sail for China. They arrived in Fuzhou on April 12 the next year, reinforcing the mission work that had been commenced by Revs. Moses Clark White and Judson Dwight Collins. On July 10, 1850, Maclay and Henrietta Caroline Sperry were married in Hong Kong by Bishop George Smith. The newly wedded couple returned on August 14 to the mission field in Fuzhou, and the next year they had their first child Eleanor Henrietta Maclay. The Maclays had five sons and three daughters in total, four of whom died at a young age.

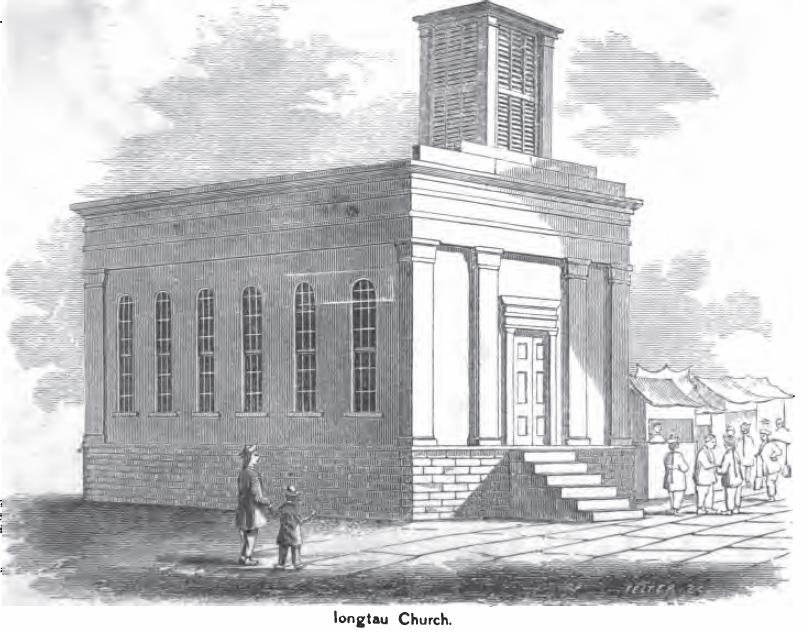
Church of the True God, the first Methodist church erected in East Asia

In their first years in China the Mission was slow in progress, faced with strong enmity and plagued with health problems. For ten years after the arrival of the first Methodists to Fuzhou, not a single convert was won. And of the twelve missionaries that had been sent before 1851 only the Maclays remained in the field by 1854; others had either died or returned to America. While the first years were primarily preparatory, significant achievements were made, however, in the educational work. By May 1849, three days schools for boys were founded, each with an attendance of twenty pupils. In December 1850, Mrs. Maclay opened the first mission school for girls, which employed a native teacher to teacher lessons in reading, writing, singing, geography, and arithmetic, by incorporating Bible stories, Christian doctrines and hymns. These schools were successful not only in providing education, but also in improving the relationship between the Chinese and the Methodist missionaries.

Shortly after the establishment of schools, Maclay and other missionaries purchased premises in and outside Fuzhou for use as chapels. Eventually, these missionaries acquired a level of fluency which permitted them to preach in the local vernacular. On August 3, 1856, the first Methodist church in East Asia, the Church of the True God (真神堂), was erected at Yangtou (洋頭); and on October 18 the same year, the second church was built on the south bank of River Min, the Church of Heavenly Peace (天安堂). On July 14, 1857, Maclay baptized the first Chinese convert connected with the Methodist Episcopal Mission, a 47-year-old man named Ting Ang (陳安).

While in China Maclay published two books: Life Among the Chinese with Characteristic Sketches and Incidents of Missionary Operations and Prospects in China (1861) and an Alphabetic Dictionary of the Chinese Language in the Foochow Dialect that he completed with Rev. Caleb Cook Baldwin (1870).

- Robert Samuel Maclay (1861). Life among the Chinese: with characteristic sketches and incidents of missionary operations and prospects in China. NEW YORK 200 MULBERRY-STREET: Carlton & Porter. pp. 400. (Original from the New York Public Library)
- Robert Samuel Maclay, C. C. Baldwin (1870). An alphabetic dictionary of the Chinese language in the Foochow dialect. FOOCHOW: Methodist Episcopal mission press. pp. 1107.(Original from the University of California)
- Robert Samuel Maclay, C. C. Baldwin (1870). An alphabetic dictionary of the Chinese language in the Foochow dialect. FOOCHOW: Methodist Episcopal mission press. pp. 1107.(Original from Harvard University)

=== Missionary work in Japan and Korea ===
In 1871, Maclay returned to the United States and was appointed superintendent of the newly founded mission in Japan. Maclay arrived in Yokohama on June 12, 1873, and immediately set about learning the Japanese language and seeking converts. He became an integral part of the Wesleyan mission in Japan, helping to found and serve as first president of the Anglo-Japanese College (now the Aoyama Gakuin) in Tokyo. While serving in Japan, Maclay was asked to travel to Korea to survey the possibility of a Methodist mission there. In June, 1884, Maclay made a brief visit to Seoul, where he acquired the permission of the king to begin medical and educational mission work. He declined leadership of the mission, though, and returned to Yokohama.

=== Retirement ===
Maclay retired from the mission field in 1887 and returned to San Fernando in California. He became the dean of the Maclay School of Theology (named for his brother Senator Charles Maclay), and spent the rest of his life as an educator. Maclay died on August 18, 1907, in Los Angeles, California.

=== Family life ===
Maclay had been married twice. On July 10, 1850, he was married to Henrietta Caroline Sperry in Hong Kong; on June 6, 1882, he was married secondly to Sarah Ann Barr in San Francisco. There were no children out of his second marriage. His youngest son Edgar Stanton Maclay (1863–1919) was a historian. His brother Charles Maclay was a state senator of California. His nephews included Judge Robert Maclay Widney, a founder of the University of Southern California, and Dr. Joseph Widney, the second president of the University of Southern California.
