= Caleb Cook Baldwin =

American missionary (1820–1911)

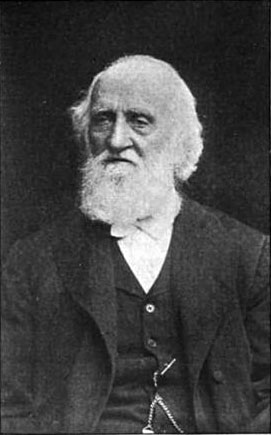
- Missionary to China
- Born: 1820; Bloomfield, New Jersey
- Died: July 20, 1911 (aged 90–91); East Orange, New Jersey

Caleb Cook Baldwin (1820 – July 20, 1911; Chinese: 摩憐 or 摩嘉立; Pinyin: Mólián, Mó Jiālì; Foochow Romanized: Mò̤-lèng, Mò̤ Gă-lĭk) was one of the first Congregationalist missionaries to Fuzhou, China.

== Life and works ==
Born in Bloomfield, New Jersey in 1820, C. C. Baldwin received his high school education at the Bloomfield Academy at the foot of "the Green" where he was also an assistant teacher. He graduated from Princeton College in 1841 and taught school from 1841 to 1844 in a state academy in Cecil Co. Maryland. Baldwin graduated from Princeton Theological Seminary in 1847 and was ordained as an Evangelist in the Old Presbyterian Church in Bloomfield. He married Harriet Fairchild of Bloomfield and left for China in 1847 in a sailing vessel. Under the American Board of Missions, the couple arrived in the spring of 1848 at Fuzhou. The couple labored together in the missionary field for 47 years (1848–1895) with short furloughs to the United States in 1859, 1871, and 1885. The Baldwins learned the native language and were responsible for extensive work in literacy, education and evangelistic departments. Founding schools and superintending them in cities and villages, the Baldwins traveled by boats, sedans and the most primitive locomotion. Baldwin's last and most important literary work was a careful version of the dictionary and the Fuzhou-language Bible. In 1895, the Baldwins returned to America where Mrs. Baldwin died in July 1896. Baldwin died of heart failure in 1911. Caleb C. Baldwin's monumental works were the Alphabetic Dictionary of the Chinese Language in the Foochow Dialect (with Robert S. Maclay) in 1870 and the Manual of the Foochow Dialect (榕腔初學撮要) in 1871. In connection with his wife he also translated much of the Bible into Fuzhou dialect and prepared text-books such as Catechism of Christian Doctrine (聖學問答).
