= Race Life of the Aryan Peoples =

1907 book by Joseph Widney

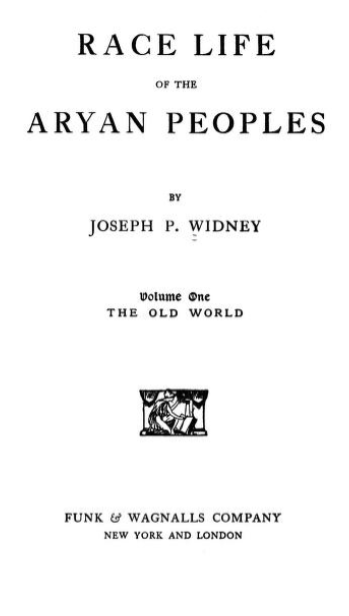
- Title page for Race Life of the Aryan Peoples (1907)
- Author: Joseph Pomeroy Widney
- Language: English
- Publisher: Funk & Wagnalls
- Publication date: 1907

Race Life of the Aryan Peoples is a two-volume book written by Joseph Pomeroy Widney, at the time chancellor of the University of Southern California, published in New York by Funk & Wagnalls in 1907.

Written before the era of modern genetic science, it purports to tell the history of the Aryan race, a hypothesized race which, in the late 19th and early 20th centuries, was commonly thought to exist and was regarded as descended from the original speakers of Proto-Indo European. At the time the book was published, the Aryan race was generally regarded as one of three major branches of the Caucasian race, along with the Semitic race and the Hamitic race. This approach to categorizing human population groups is now considered to be misguided and biologically meaningless.

== Outline of the content of the book ==
Widney describes what he believed was the origin of the "Proto-Aryans" in Central Asia about 7000 years ago, and how they spread out and formed the great "Aryan empires." He included empires which were predominantly Indo-European language-speaking: The Hittite Empire, Persian Empire, Mauryan Empire, Macedonian empire, Roman Empire, Gupta Empire, Spanish Empire, First French Empire, and British Empire, finally resulting in the colonization of North America by the "Aryans", with the entire process culminating in the manifest destiny of the "Aryan Americans" of the United States to establish an American Empire:

Every land is filled with the nameless graves of races which have died out, from the Mound Builders of the Mississippi Valley to the Hittites of upper Syria, or the Negroid of the lower Euphratean plain—disappeared from the earth; supplanted by some other and more efficient race type. The earth is only one vast grave of dead and buried races-even the tombs forgotten until the spade of the antiquary chances upon them. It is some times said that these failing races did not have the same chance as the Aryan. In one sense this is true; for races seem to differ in original capacity for development. The Bushman of Australia apparently exhausted his capacity in the evolution of the boomerang; the Indian of the Orinoco, in his blow-pipe and poisoned arrow. But original capacity is gift, not evolution. It takes hold upon some deeper law of being. There are tongues, there are races, there are civilizations, which seem to lack the power of more than a limited growth. They quickly reach a maturity of a low type; then seem to have in them no further possibility of development. But in an other sense they have had the same chance as the Aryan. They, too, have had earth, and sea, and sky. But while the Aryan out of these same material surroundings has evolved a civilization of the higher type, they only evolved the lower type. And the Aryan did not borrow; he evolved. The question naturally arises, Why did they not do the same? We can only drop back upon the one explanation-lack of original capacity.... Every racial division of mankind seems to have a type of civilization which, and which only, is normal to that especial race . All other types seem to be abnormal and alien to it. Its own type is normal because it is in harmony with the individual race type of mind, and has been evolved by it. A borrowed civilization ignores and violates this law, for the types are dissimilar. It is not a difference of degree, but an unlikeness of type. This fact explains why borrowed civilizations have always proven to be failures when taken from radically unlike peoples.

— Joseph Pomeroy Widney, Race Life of the Aryan Peoples (1907), vol. II, pgs. 234-235.

== Ethnic groups traditionally regarded as included in the Aryan race ==
The book also discusses the "racial characteristics" of the various subgroups of the Aryan race and their constituent ethnic groups. Widney believed that these characteristics were determined by the soil and climate of the original homeland of each subgroup or individual ethnic group. The Eastern branch, according to Widney, included the Indo-Aryans (including the Maldivians) and the Iranian peoples (including Kurds). The Western branch included the Armenians, Balts, Slavs, Romani, Albanians, Greeks, Romanics, Teutonics, Celts, Anglo-Americans (includes the European-Americans and the Anglo-Canadians), Québécois, North American White Hispanics, White Latin Americans, Anglo-Australians, Anglo-New Zealanders, British diaspora in Africa, and Boers.

== Editions ==
- 100th Anniversary edition: Race Life of the Aryan Peoples Volumes 1 and 2 (Hardcover) Kessinger Publishing (2007) (ISBN 0548108781)

== See also ==
- Anatolian hypothesis
- Indo-Aryan migration
- Kurgan hypothesis
- Proto-Indo-Europeans
- Indo-European migrations
