= George W. White (educator) =

President of the University of Southern California

Rev. George W. White during his tenure as President of USC

The Reverend George W. White, D.D. (February 18, 1858 – December 1, 1940) was an American minister. He was the third president of the University of Southern California. He held office from 1895 to 1899. At the time of his appointment, he was presiding elder of the Los Angeles District of the Methodist Episcopal Conference.

Academic offices
Preceded by Joseph P. Widney	3rd President of the University of Southern California; 1895-1899	Succeeded by George F. Bovard
