= Eliza Griffin Johnston =

American wildflower painter and diarist (1821–1896)

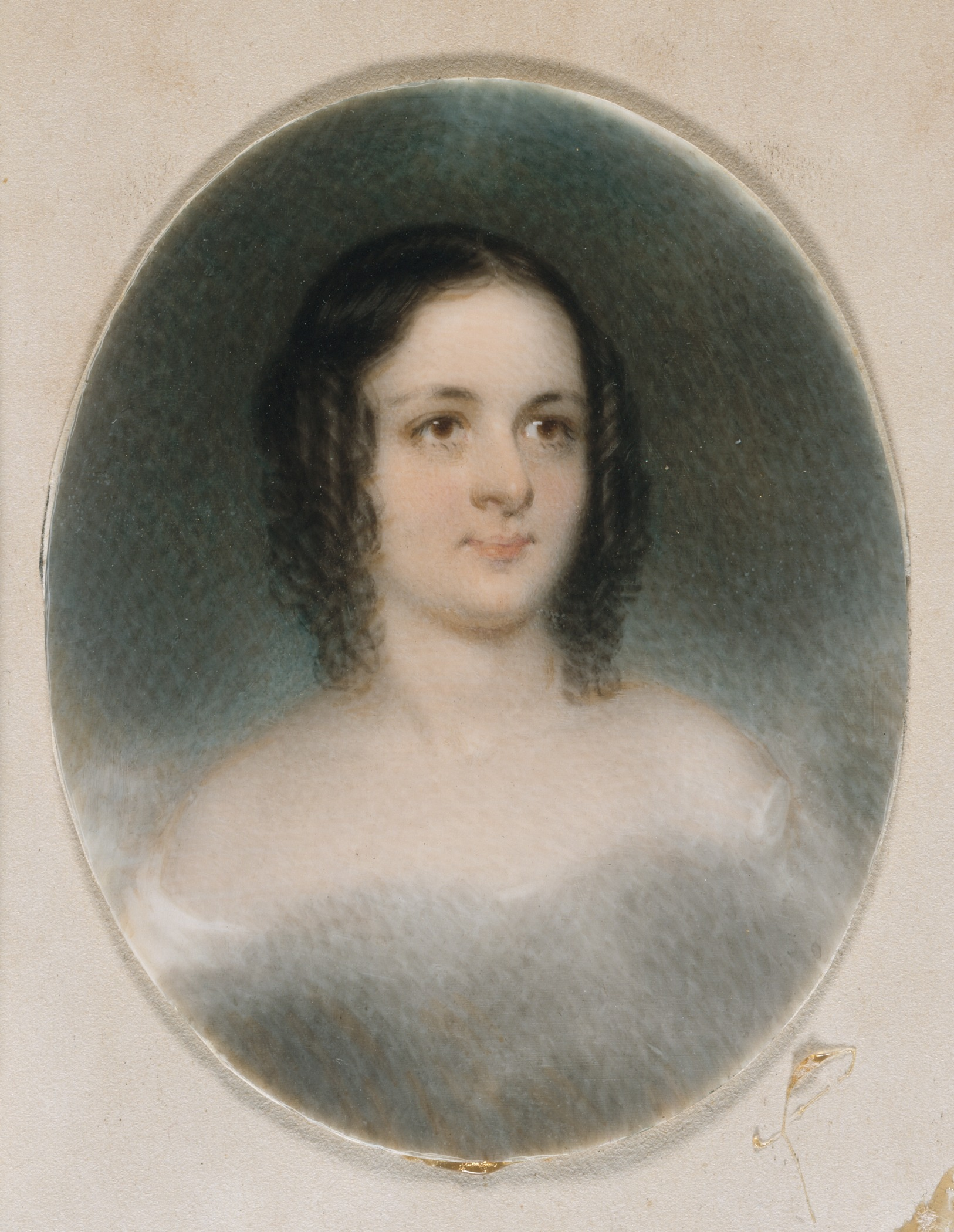
- portrait by Thomas Campbell
- Born: December 26, 1821; Fincastle
- Died: September 25, 1896 (aged 74); Los Angeles
- Occupation: Painter, diarist
- Spouse(s): Albert Sidney Johnston
- Parent(s): John Caswell Griffin; Mary Talbot Griffin

Eliza Croghan Griffin Johnston (December 26, 1821 – September 25, 1896) was an American wildflower painter and diarist. She was the second wife of Confederate General Albert Sidney Johnston.

== Life ==
Eliza Croghan Griffin was born on December 26, 1821 in Fincastle, Virginia. She was the only surviving daughter of John Caswell Griffin and Mary Talbot Hancock Griffin. After her parents died in 1826, she was raised by her maternal grandfather, then her maternal uncle, who lived in Louisville, Kentucky. She was educated at Mrs. Segoigne's School in Philadelphia and learned painting, piano, singing, and French.

In 1843, Eliza Griffin married Albert Sidney Johnston. She was the first cousin of his late wife Henrietta Preston. They lived on a plantation near Galveston, Texas called China Grove, which they lost a few years later, unable to pay the mortgage. They later settled in Austin, Texas. In Texas, Eliza Johnston painted Texas birds and wildflowers. A hundred and one of her paintings were published as Texas Wild Flowers in 1971.

When Albert Johnston was appointed to lead the 2nd Cavalry Regiment, she travelled with him from Missouri to Texas in 1855 and 1856. Her diary of this period is a source of historical information about the military of the time and of individuals who were future participants in the American Civil War.

During the Civil War, Eliza Johnston and her children lived with her brother in Los Angeles, California. She raised the children herself after Albert Johnston was killed at the Battle of Shiloh in 1862.

Eliza Griffin Johnston died on 25 September 1896 in Los Angeles.
