= Marion McKinley Bovard =

First president of the University of Southern California (1847–1891)

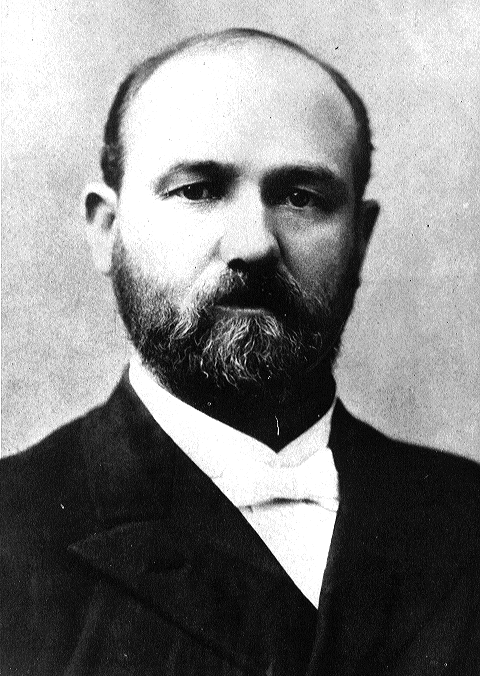

Marion McKinley Bovard (January 11, 1847 – December 29, 1891) was the first president of the University of Southern California in Los Angeles, California. He held office from the school's founding in 1880 until his death in December 1891. At the time of its founding, the city of Los Angeles had only 11,000 people. Bovard oversaw the establishment of the College of Letters, Arts and Sciences (1880), School of Music (1884), College of Medicine (1885) and what would become the School of Fine Arts (1887). He was also the president during the creation of the precursor to the Spirit of Troy and the school's first college football game in 1888.

Upon his death, the fledgling school was still facing financial hardships that became the focus of his successor, Joseph P. Widney, M.D.

Academic offices
Preceded by (none)	1st President of the University of Southern California; 1880-1891	Succeeded by Joseph P. Widney
