= Alonzo Ridley =

American 49er, trader and engineer

Alonzo Ridley (June 3, 1826 – March 25, 1909) was a 49er, trader, Indian agent, engineer, Undersheriff of Los Angeles County, and Confederate Army officer from California, who led the Los Angeles Mounted Rifles on their march across the Southwestern deserts from California to Texas in 1861.

== Early life ==
Ridley was born in 1826 in Bowdoin, Maine. He lived in New England until 1849, when he left Massachusetts for California.
