= Charles Maclay =

American politician

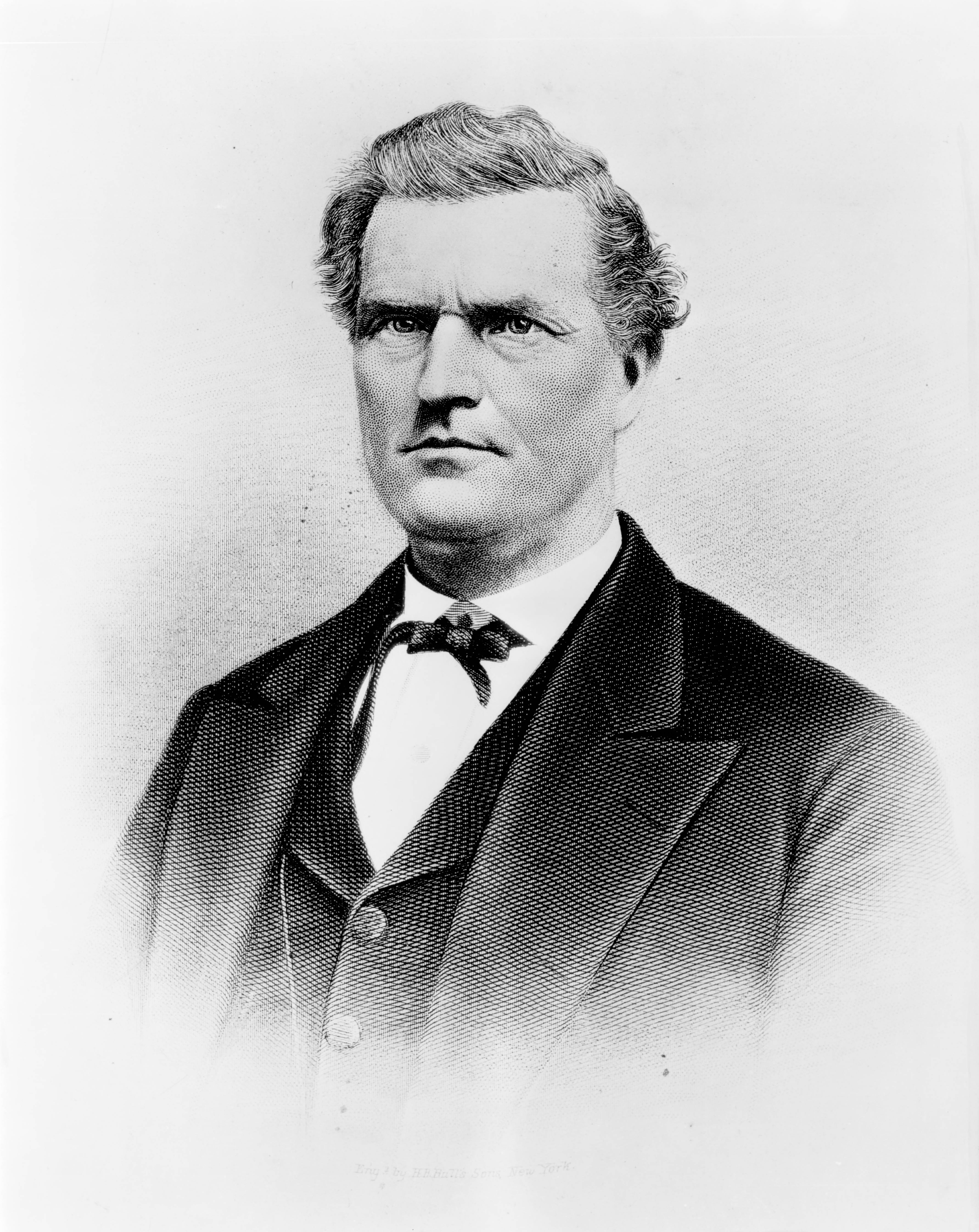
Charles Maclay

Charles Maclay (November 9, 1822 – July 19, 1890) was a California state senator and is known for his act of purchasing a 56,000-acre land grant in 1874, what was known as San Fernando Rancho, and using the land to found the city of San Fernando, California in the San Fernando Valley.

== History ==
Charles Maclay's heritage was Scots-Irish. He was the brother of Robert Samuel Maclay, a pioneer missionary to China; and the uncle of Robert Maclay Widney, a founder of the University of Southern California, and of Joseph Widney, the second president of the University of Southern California. Maclay was a Methodist minister.

Charles Maclay, an abolitionist, became a California State Assemblyman in the 7th District from Santa Clara County (1861-1863) and later a California State Senator (1867-1872).

In 1867, when the seat held by State Senator William J. Knox came open after Knox's unexpected death, The San Jose Mercury, campaigned for Maclay with the popular song "Wha'll be King but Charlie?" (Scots for "Who'll be king but Charlie.")

=== San Fernando Valley, California ===
In 1874, Maclay purchased a 56,000-acre land grant in 1874, what was known as San Fernando Rancho.

In 1882, cousins George K. Porter and Benjamin F. Porter, owner of future Porter Ranch, each received one-third of the total land.

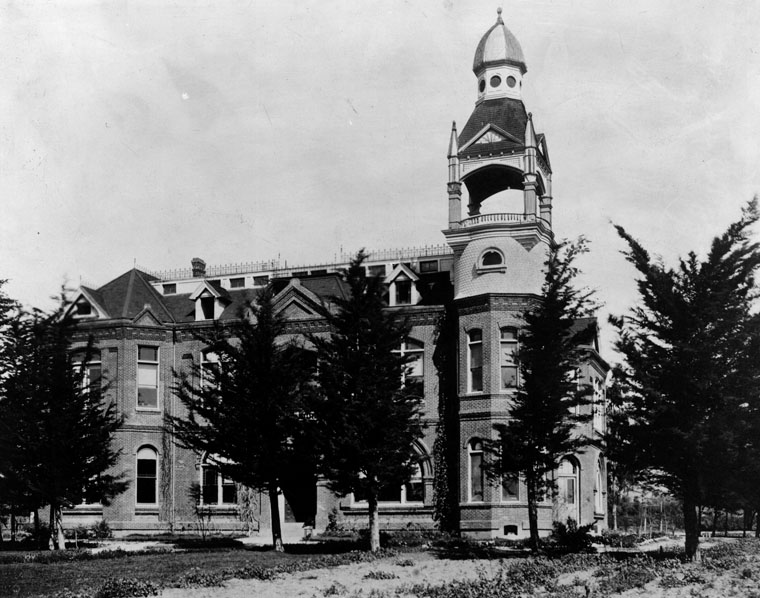
Maclay School of Theology, in San Fernando, California circa 1890.

In 1885, Maclay founded the Maclay School of Theology, a Methodist seminary in his newly founded town of San Fernando, California. After his death it became an affiliate and moved to the campus of the University of Southern California before becoming the Claremont School of Theology in 1957.

== Legacy ==
- City of San Fernando
- Claremont School of Theology
- Charles Maclay Junior High School, Pacoima, California: in 1960, the High School opened in his honor. In the late 1990s the school was renamed the Charles Maclay Middle School. Their slogan is Home of the Scotsman and uniforms sport their school colors green, white, and grey.
- Maclay Street is a central thoroughfare through the City of San Fernando, crossing from Laurel Canyon Boulevard to Pacoima Canyon Road.

== See also ==
- Ranchos of California
- History of the San Fernando Valley to 1915
