= Robert M. Widney =

American judge and founder of the University of Southern California

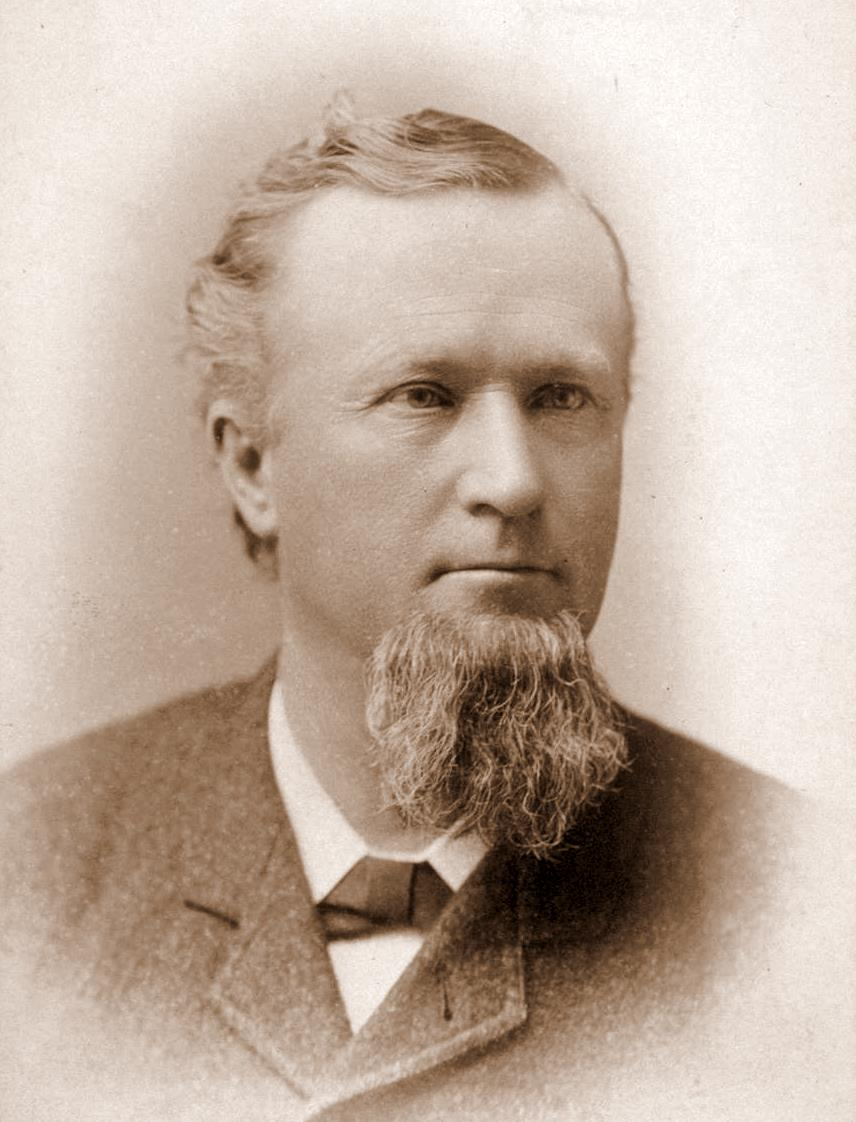
Robert M. Widney

Robert Maclay Widney (December 23, 1838 – November 14, 1929) was an American lawyer, judge, and one of the founders of the University of Southern California (USC).

== History ==
He was born in Piqua, Ohio. He was the older brother of Joseph Widney, second president of USC; and the nephew of Robert Samuel Maclay, a pioneer missionary to China; and Charles Maclay, later a state senator for California.

Widney left Ohio in September 1855 and spent two years hunting and trapping on the Great Plains and in the Rocky Mountains.

=== Los Angeles ===
Widney arrived in California in September 1857. He studied at the University of the Pacific (then located in Santa Clara) from 1858 to 1862. He was admitted to the bar in 1865, and moved to Los Angeles in 1867. In 1871, he was named a judge of the Court of California for Los Angeles and San Bernardino Counties. He was a founder of the Los Angeles Chamber of Commerce (established in 1873). He was a member of the 19th century 'Lincoln' Republican Party.

In 1874 Widney began the first successful public rail transit company in Los Angeles, building a 1.5 miles (2.4 km) horse drawn trolly line between Los Angeles Plaza and 6th Street at Pearl Street (present day Figueroa Street in downtown Los Angeles).

=== University of Southern California ===
Los Angeles was still a growing frontier town in the early 1870s, when a group of public-spirited citizens led by Judge Robert Maclay Widney first saw the need and imagined establishing a university in the city. It took nearly a decade for this vision to become a reality, but in 1879 Widney formed a board of trustees and on July 29, 1879, secured a donation of 308 lots of undeveloped land in South Los Angeles from three prominent members of the community — Ozro W. Childs, a Protestant Los Angeles horticulturist and merchant; former California governor John G. Downey, an Irish-Catholic pharmacist and businessman; and Isaias W. Hellman, a German-Jewish Los Angeles philanthropist and banker/founder of Farmers and Merchants Bank of Los Angeles. The gift provided land for a campus as well as a source of endowment, the seeds of financial support for the nascent institution.

On August 29, 2014, a statue of Judge Robert Maclay Widney was unveiled by USC President C. L. Max Nikias before USC Trustees, senior leadership, and members of the USC community, including descendants of the founder. The bronze monument, sculpted by Christopher Slatoff, stands on campus at the entrance of the Widney Alumni House.

=== Death ===
Robert M. Widney died on November 14, 1929 at the age of 90 in Los Angeles. He was interred at Angelus-Rosedale Cemetery in Central Los Angeles.
