= 1974 NCAA Division I tennis championships =

1974 NCAA Division I Tennis Championships
- Date: May 1974
- Edition: 29th
- Location: Los Angeles, California
- Venue: David X. Marks Tennis Stadium; University of Southern California

Champions

Men's singles
- (United States) John Whitlinger (Stanford)

Men's doubles
- (United States) John Whitlinger / (United States) Jim Delaney (Stanford)
← 1973 ·	NCAA Division I Tennis Championships	· 1975 →

The 1974 NCAA Division I Tennis Championships were the 29th annual tournaments to determine the national champions of NCAA Division I men's singles, doubles, and team collegiate tennis in the United States. This was the first year after the NCAA changed the name of the University Division to its present-day moniker, Division I.

Defending champions Stanford once again captured the team championship, the Indians' second such title. Stanford finished five points ahead of USC in the final team standings (30–25).

== Host site ==
This year's tournaments were contested at the David X. Marks Tennis Stadium at the University of Southern California in Los Angeles, California.

== Team scoring ==
Until 1977, the men's team championship was determined by points awarded based on individual performances in the singles and doubles events.
