= Mark Jackson (athletic director) =

American athletic director (born 1972)

Current position
- Title: Athletic director
- Team: Northwestern
- Conference: Big Ten

Biographical details
- Born: September 14, 1972 (age 54); Boston, Massachusetts, U.S.
- Education: Colby College, B.A. Trinity College, M.A.

Playing career
- 1991–1994: Colby
- Position: Defensive back

Administrative career (AD unless noted)
- 2015–2024: Villanova
- 2024–present: Northwestern

Mark Jackson (born September 14, 1972) is the athletic director for Northwestern University. Previously, Jackson was the senior associate athletic director for the University of Southern California and the athletic director for Villanova University.

== Education and Playing career ==
Jackson graduated from Xaverian Brothers High School in Westwood, Massachusetts. He then received a bachelor's degree in Government from Colby College, where played defensive back on the football team from 1991 to 1994. Jackson also received a master's degree in Public Policy from Trinity College (Connecticut) in 1997.

== Coaching career ==
Jackson began his coaching career in football as a graduate assistant at Trinity from 1995 to 1996 as he pursued his master's degree.

Jackson joined the New England Patriots' coaching staff as a special teams coaching assistant under then-Patriots head coach Pete Carroll in 1998. Carroll was fired following the 1999, but Jackson stayed on with new head coach Bill Belichick's coaching staff as a special teams and running backs coaching assistant through 2000.

== Athletics management career ==
In 2001, Jackson rejoined Carroll, then the head coach at the University of Southern California, as the school's director of football operations and assistant athletic director, a position he held through 2005. Jackson was instrumental in building projects for the USC athletic program, including the McKay Center, the Uytengsu Aquatics Center and the renovation of Heritage Hall.

In 2006, Jackson served as Executive Senior Associate Director of Athletics at Syracuse University before being hired as Vice President of Athlete Development at the boxing development firm A2 Holdings.

Jackson was then hired by Oakland Raiders coach Lane Kiffin as the team's director of football development in 2007. On December 15, 2008, Raiders head coach Tom Cable announced that Jackson had been relieved of his duties amid a public departure of Raider assistant James Cregg who joined Kiffin's staff at the University of Tennessee.

== Athletic director at Villanova ==
After his time with the Raiders, Jackson returned to the USC athletic department before his selection as Athletic Director at Villanova in 2015. In his time at Villanova, the men's basketball program has won two of their three NCAA titles, reaching the Final Four three times and winning the Big East Conference tournaments and five regular season championships.

In March 2020, Jackson was one of 28 collegiate athletic directors selected as a winner of the Under Armour AD of the Year Award (ADOY), presented by the National Association of Collegiate Directors in Athletics (NACDA). He has served as chair and co-chair (Respectively) of the Big East Athletic Directors Committee, the Big Five Athletic Directors Committee, and the Collegiate Sports Summit for Athletic Directors. Four times at Villanova, the Wildcats program won the Big East Conference President's Cup, a measure of performance "in athletic competition, academic performance and community service."

=== USC athletic director candidacy ===
On three occasions when the USC athletic director position became vacant (in 2016, 2019 and 2023), Jackson was named as a leading candidate for the position, owing to his experience at the school.

Jackson rejected the position in 2016 after Pat Haden left the role.

In 2019, after Lynn Swann's resignation as USC AD, the Trojans were far enough along in their negotiations with Jackson that they were even exploring the details of his buyout with Villanova. However, Jackson has rebuffed all mentions of returning to USC and remained at Villanova. The Trojans eventually hired former Cincinnati Bearcats AD Mike Bohn.

When reports of a hostile work environment forced Bohn to resign under pressure in May 2023, The Athletic mentioned Jackson's name, but the school chose former University of Washington AD Jennifer Cohen instead.
