= 1968 NCAA University Division tennis championships =

1968 NCAA University Division Tennis Championships
- Date: May 1968
- Edition: 23rd
- Location: San Antonio, Texas
- Venue: Trinity University

Champions

Men's singles
- (United States) Stan Smith (USC)

Men's doubles
- (United States) Bob Lutz / (United States) Stan Smith (USC)
← 1967 ·	NCAA University Division Tennis Championships	· 1969 →

The 1968 NCAA University Division Tennis Championships were the 23rd annual tournaments to determine the national champions of NCAA University Division men's singles, doubles, and team collegiate tennis in the United States.

Two-time defending champions USC captured the team championship, the Trojans' tenth such title. USC finished eight points ahead of Rice in the final team standings (31–23). Furthermore, Bob Lutz and Stan Smith (both from USC) also repeated as doubles champions while Smith claimed the singles title over defending champion Lutz.

== Host site ==
This year's tournaments were contested at Trinity University in San Antonio, Texas.

== Team scoring ==
Until 1977, the men's team championship was determined by points awarded based on individual performances in the singles and doubles events.
