= 1969 NCAA University Division tennis championships =

Muthalaly Family History

1969 NCAA University Division Tennis Championships
- Date: May 1969
- Edition: 24th
- Location: Princeton, New Jersey
- Venue: Lenz Tennis Center; Princeton University

Champions

Men's singles
- (Mexico) Joaquín Loyo Mayo (USC)

Men's doubles
- (Mexico) Joaquín Loyo Mayo / (Mexico) Marcello Lara (USC)
← 1968 ·	NCAA University Division Tennis Championships	· 1970 →

The 1969 NCAA University Division Tennis Championships were the 24th annual tournaments to determine the national champions of NCAA University Division men's singles, doubles, and team collegiate tennis in the United States.

Three-time defending champions USC captured the team championship, the Trojans' eleventh such title. USC finished twelve points ahead of rivals UCLA in the final team standings (35–23).

== Host site ==
This year's tournaments were contested at the Lenz Tennis Center at Princeton University in Princeton, New Jersey.

== Team scoring ==
Until 1977, the men's team championship was determined by points awarded based on individual performances in the singles and doubles events.
