= 1967 NCAA University Division tennis championships =

1967 NCAA University Division Tennis Championships
- Date: May 1967
- Edition: 22nd
- Location: Carbondale, Illinois
- Venue: SIU Courts; Southern Illinois University Carbondale

Champions

Men's singles
- (United States) Bob Lutz (USC)

Men's doubles
- (United States) Bob Lutz / (United States) Stan Smith (USC)
← 1966 ·	NCAA University Division Tennis Championships	· 1968 →

The 1967 NCAA University Division Tennis Championships were the 22nd annual tournaments to determine the national champions of NCAA University Division men's singles, doubles, and team collegiate tennis in the United States.

Defending champions USC captured the team championship, the Trojans' ninth such title. USC finished five points ahead of rivals UCLA in the final team standings (28–23).

== Host site ==
This year's tournaments were contested at the SIU Courts at Southern Illinois University Carbondale in Carbondale, Illinois.

== Team scoring ==
Until 1977, the men's team championship was determined by points awarded based on individual performances in the singles and doubles events.
