= 1973 NCAA University Division tennis championships =

1973 NCAA University Division Tennis Championships
- Date: May 1973
- Edition: 28th
- Location: Princeton, New Jersey
- Venue: Lenz Tennis Center; Princeton University

Champions

Men's singles
- (United States) Sandy Mayer (Stanford)

Men's doubles
- (United States) Sandy Mayer / (United States) Jim Delaney (Stanford)
← 1972 ·	NCAA University Division Tennis Championships	· 1974 →

The 1973 NCAA University Division Tennis Championships were the 28th annual tournaments to determine the national champions of NCAA University Division men's singles, doubles, and team collegiate tennis in the United States. This was the final year before the NCAA changed the name of its University Division to its present-day moniker, Division I.

Stanford, the previous year's runners-up, captured the team championship, the Cardinal's first such title. Stanford finished five points ahead of USC in the final team standings (33–28).

== Host site ==
This year's tournaments were contested at the Lenz Tennis Center at Princeton University in Princeton, New Jersey.

== Team scoring ==
Until 1977, the men's team championship was determined by points awarded based on individual performances in the singles and doubles events.
