= Felix Field and Loker Stadium =

Athletics venue in Los Angeles, California

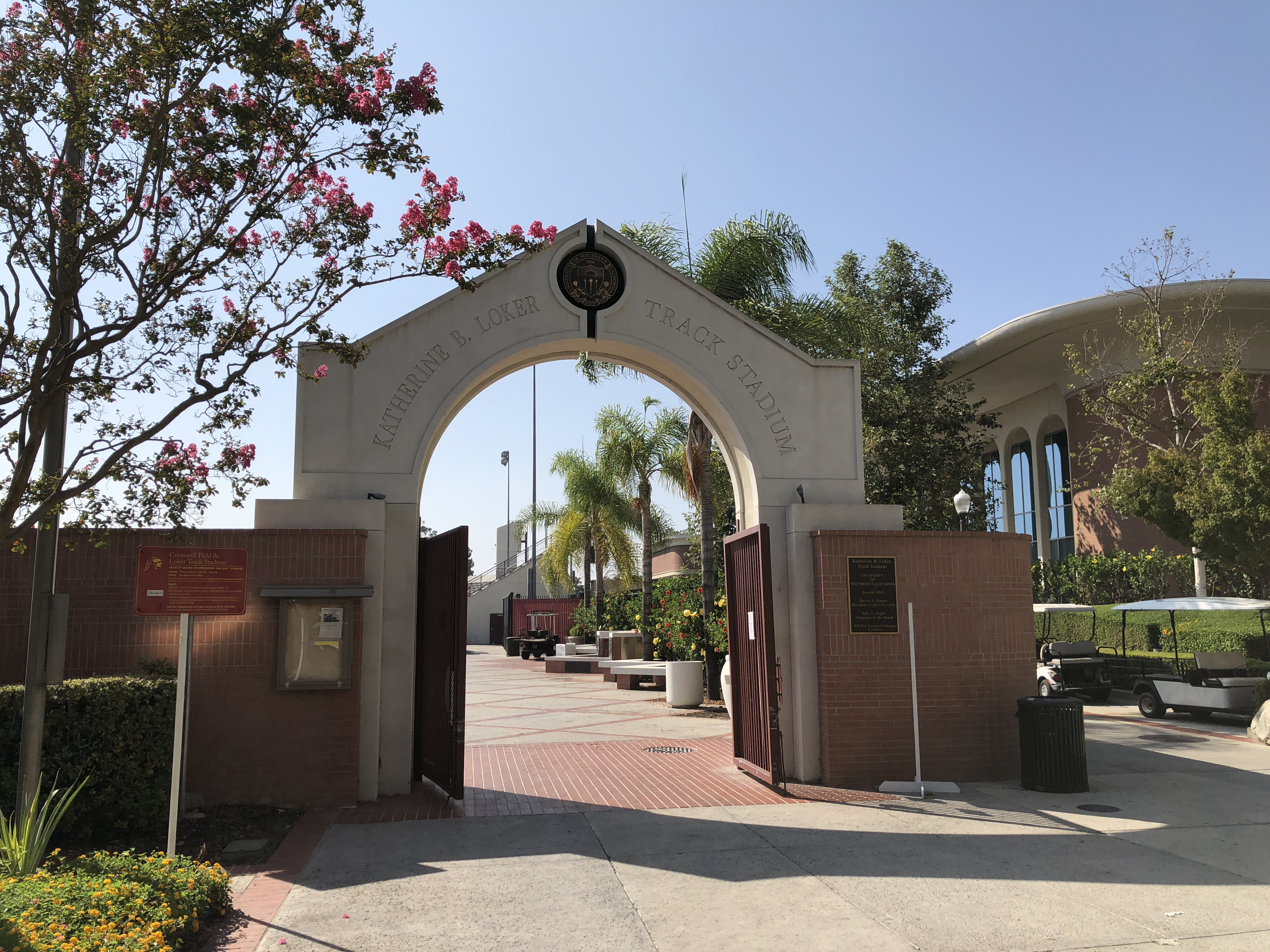
- Interactive map of Felix Field and Loker Stadium
- Location: 3550 McClintock Ave. Los Angeles
- Coordinates: 34.021°N 118.286°W
- Owner: University of Southern California
- Operator: University of Southern California
- Capacity: 3,000

Construction
- Built: 2001
- Opened: 2001

Tenants
- USC Trojans (NCAA) (2001–present)

Felix Field and Loker Stadium is an outdoor track and field facility located on the campus of the University of Southern California in Los Angeles. The facility, rebuilt in 2001, serves as the outdoor home of the USC Trojans men's and women's track and field teams. The stadium is named for Katherine B. Loker and has a seating capacity of 3,000. The field located at the center of the stadium was previously known as Cromwell Field, originally named after Dean Cromwell, USC’s track and field coach from 1909 to 1948. The University renamed the field in 2023 to honor USC alumnae and US Olympian Allyson Felix. The entrance to the facility is called "Louis Zamperini Plaza" and includes tributes to USC's NCAA and Olympic champions.

== Renovations ==
Felix Field and Loker Stadium both underwent renovations in the winter of 2012–2013. The track and the infield were replaced and the exterior of the stadium was renovated.

== Events ==
During the 1984 Summer Olympics, the facility served as the training track at the USC Olympic Village and the warm-up track for the track and field competition. The facility hosted the PAC-10 conference championship meet in 2003 and PAC-12 conference championship meet in 2013. The 2015 Special Olympics World Summer Games were held at the facility.

== Gallery ==
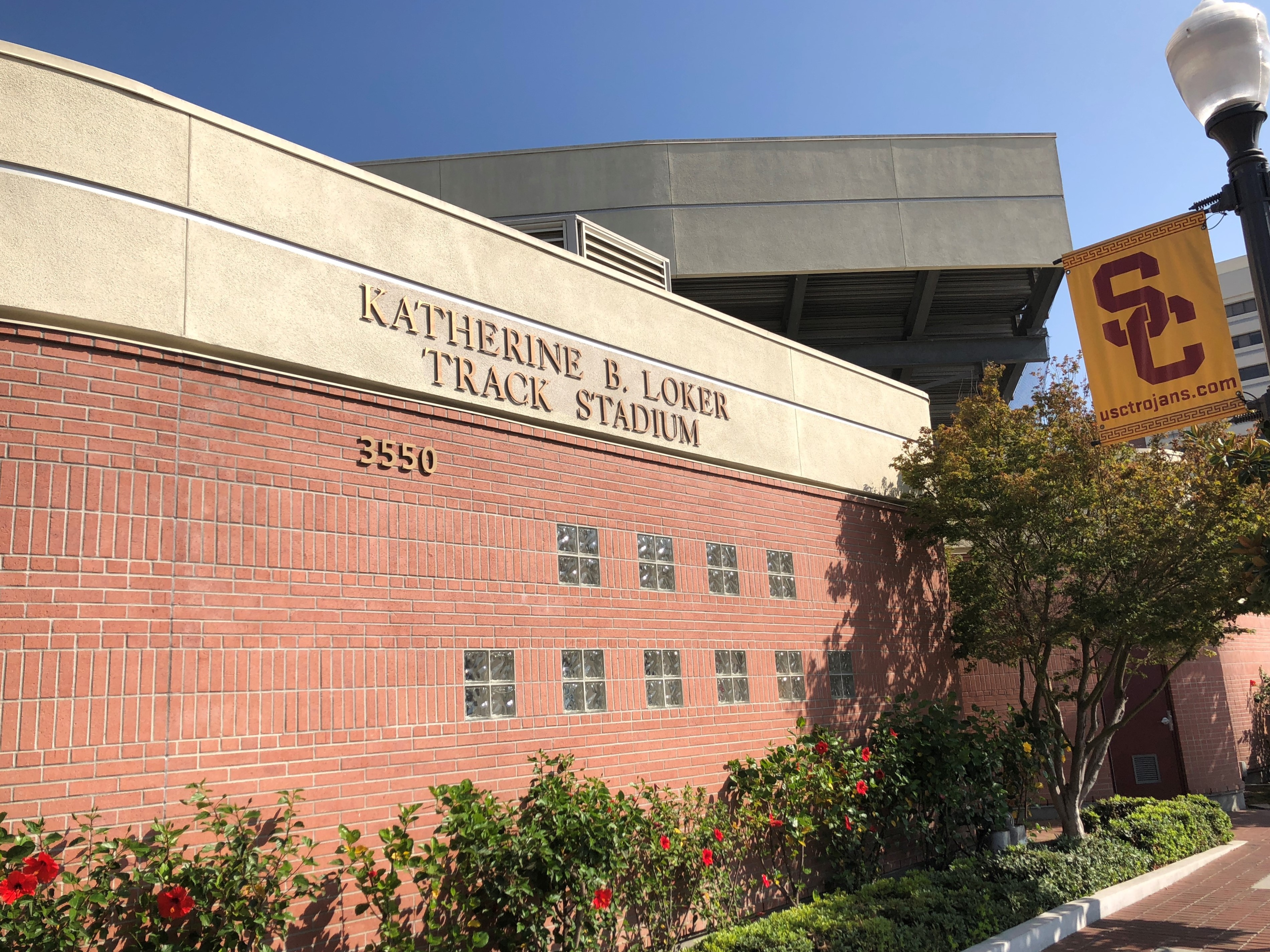
Felix Field and Loker Stadium Exterior

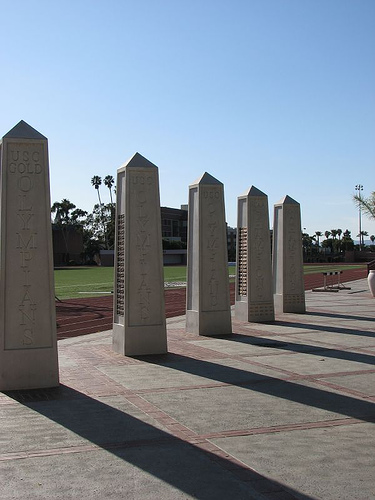
Louis Zamperini Plaza in Loker Stadium

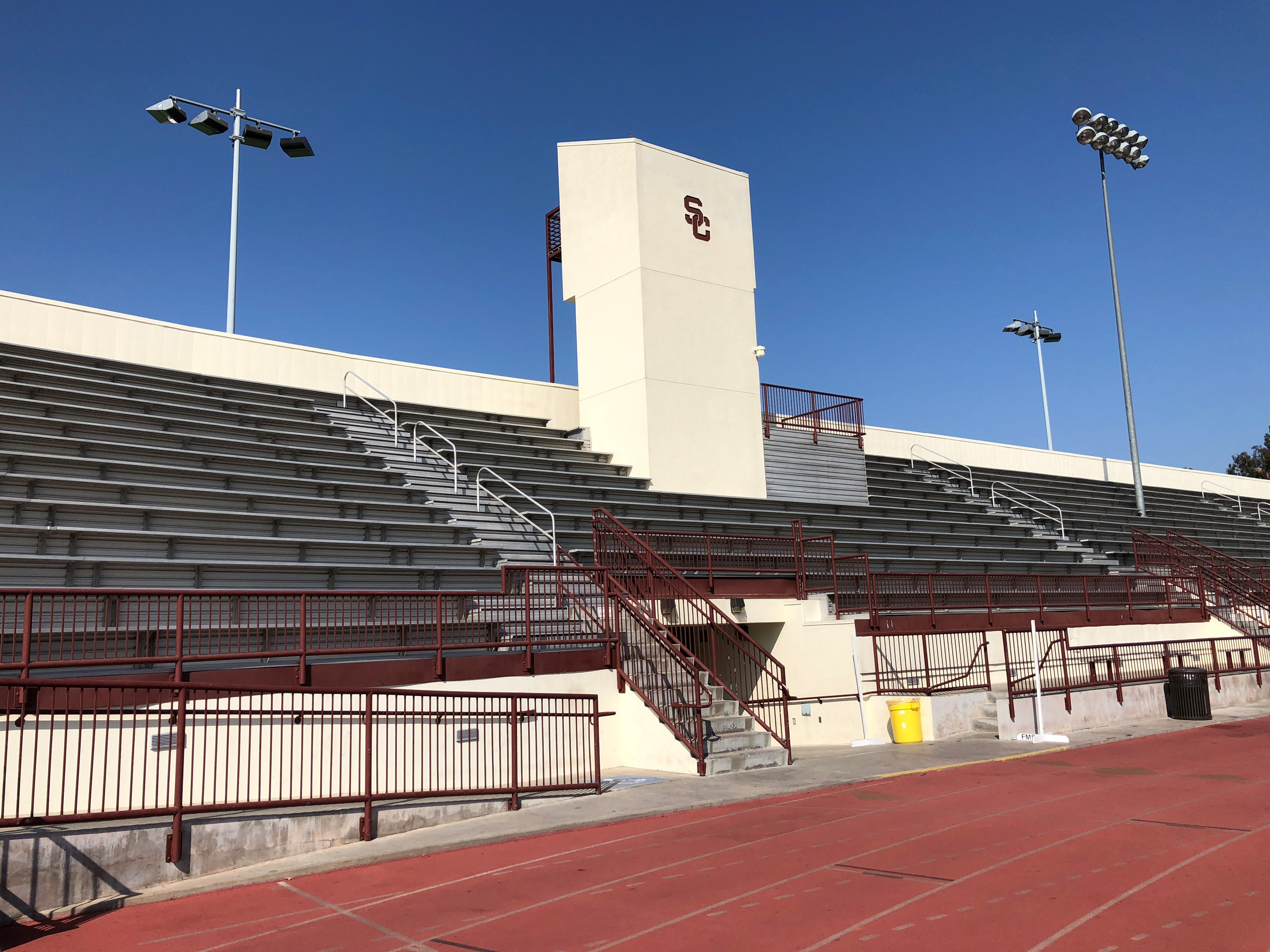
Felix Field and Loker Stadium Grandstand

== See also ==
- USC Trojans
