= 1971 NCAA University Division tennis championships =

1971 NCAA University Division Tennis Championships
- Date: May 1971
- Edition: 26th
- Location: South Bend, Indiana
- Venue: Courtney Tennis Center; University of Notre Dame

Champions

Men's singles
- (United States) Jimmy Connors (UCLA)

Men's doubles
- (Pakistan) Haroon Rahim / (United States) Jeff Borowiak (UCLA)
← 1970 ·	NCAA University Division Tennis Championships	· 1972 →

The 1971 NCAA University Division Tennis Championships were the 26th annual tournaments to determine the national champions of NCAA University Division men's singles, doubles, and team collegiate tennis in the United States.

Defending champions UCLA captured the team championship, the Bruins' tenth such title. UCLA finished eight points ahead of Trinity (TX) in the final team standings (35–27).

== Host site ==
This year's tournaments were contested at the Courtney Tennis Center at the University of Notre Dame in South Bend, Indiana.

== Team scoring ==
Until 1977, the men's team championship was determined by points awarded based on individual performances in the singles and doubles events.
