= 1970 NCAA University Division tennis championships =

1970 NCAA University Division Tennis Championships
- Date: May 1970
- Edition: 25th
- Location: Salt Lake City, Utah
- Venue: Eccles Tennis Center; University of Utah

Champions

Men's singles
- (United States) Jeff Borowiak (UCLA)

Men's doubles
- (South Africa) Pat Cramer / (Mexico) Luis-Augusto García (Miami)
← 1969 ·	NCAA University Division Tennis Championships	· 1971 →

The 1970 NCAA University Division Tennis Championships were the 25th annual tournaments to determine the national champions of NCAA University Division men's singles, doubles, and team collegiate tennis in the United States.

UCLA captured the team championship, the Bruins' ninth such title. UCLA finished four points ahead of Rice and Trinity (TX) in the final team standings (26–22–22).

== Host site ==
This year's tournaments were contested at the Eccles Tennis Center at the University of Utah in Salt Lake City, Utah.

== Team scoring ==
Until 1977, the men's team championship was determined by points awarded based on individual performances in the singles and doubles events.
