= 1972 NCAA University Division tennis championships =

1972 NCAA University Division Tennis Championships
- Date: May 1972
- Edition: 27th
- Location: Athens, Georgia
- Venue: University of Georgia

Champions

Men's singles
- (United States) Dick Stockton (Trinity)

Men's doubles
- (United States) Sandy Mayer / (United States) Roscoe Tanner (Stanford)
← 1971 ·	NCAA University Division Tennis Championships	· 1973 →

The 1972 NCAA University Division Tennis Championships were the 27th annual tournaments to determine the national champions of NCAA University Division men's singles, doubles, and team collegiate tennis in the United States.

Trinity (TX) captured the team championship, the Tigers' first such title. Trinity finished six points ahead of Stanford in the final team standings (36–30).

== Host site ==
This year's tournaments were contested at the University of Georgia in Athens, Georgia.

== Team scoring ==
Until 1977, the men's team championship was determined by points awarded based on individual performances in the singles and doubles events.
