= David X. Marks Tennis Stadium =

Tennis facility in Los Angeles, California

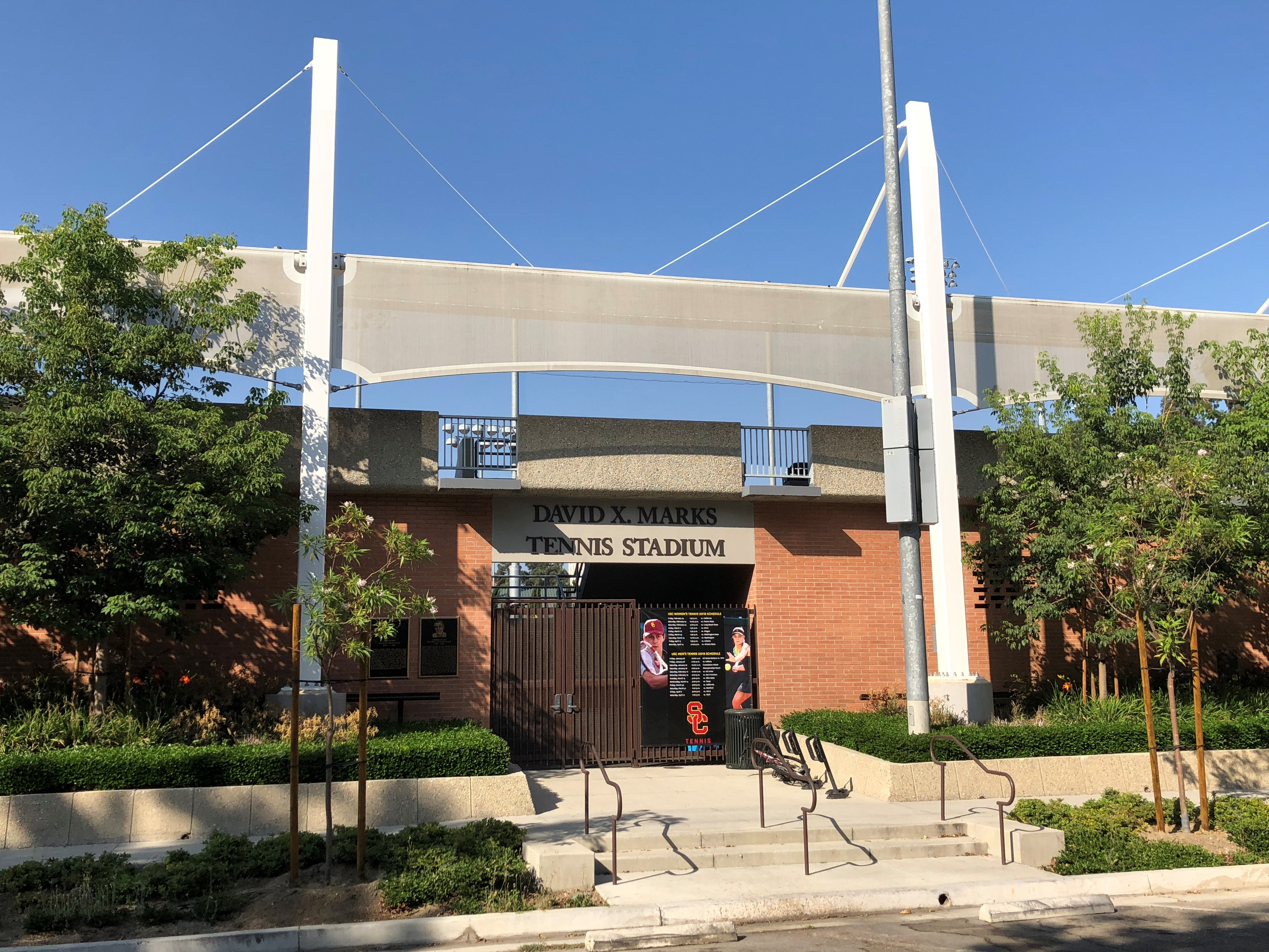
- Interactive map of David X. Marks Tennis Stadium
- Location: 1075 Childs Way; Los Angeles
- Coordinates: 34.021°N 118.286°W
- Owner: University of Southern California
- Operator: University of Southern California
- Capacity: 1,000

Construction
- Opened: 1971

Tenants
- USC Trojans (NCAA) (1971–present)

The David X. Marks Tennis Stadium is a tennis facility located on the campus of the University of Southern California in Los Angeles. The facility, built in 1971, serves as the home of the USC Trojans men's and women's tennis teams. The facility provides six outdoor tennis courts and has a seating capacity of 1,000. The stadium is named for David X. Marks, a World War I pilot.

== Renovations ==
In 2015, The Buntmann Family Tennis Center was added and includes a new entrance and lobby. In 2005, a new LED scoreboard was installed. In 2002, 700 chair-back seats were added replacing bleacher seating.

== Events ==
The 1974 men’s NCAA Tennis Tournament was held at the stadium.

== Gallery ==
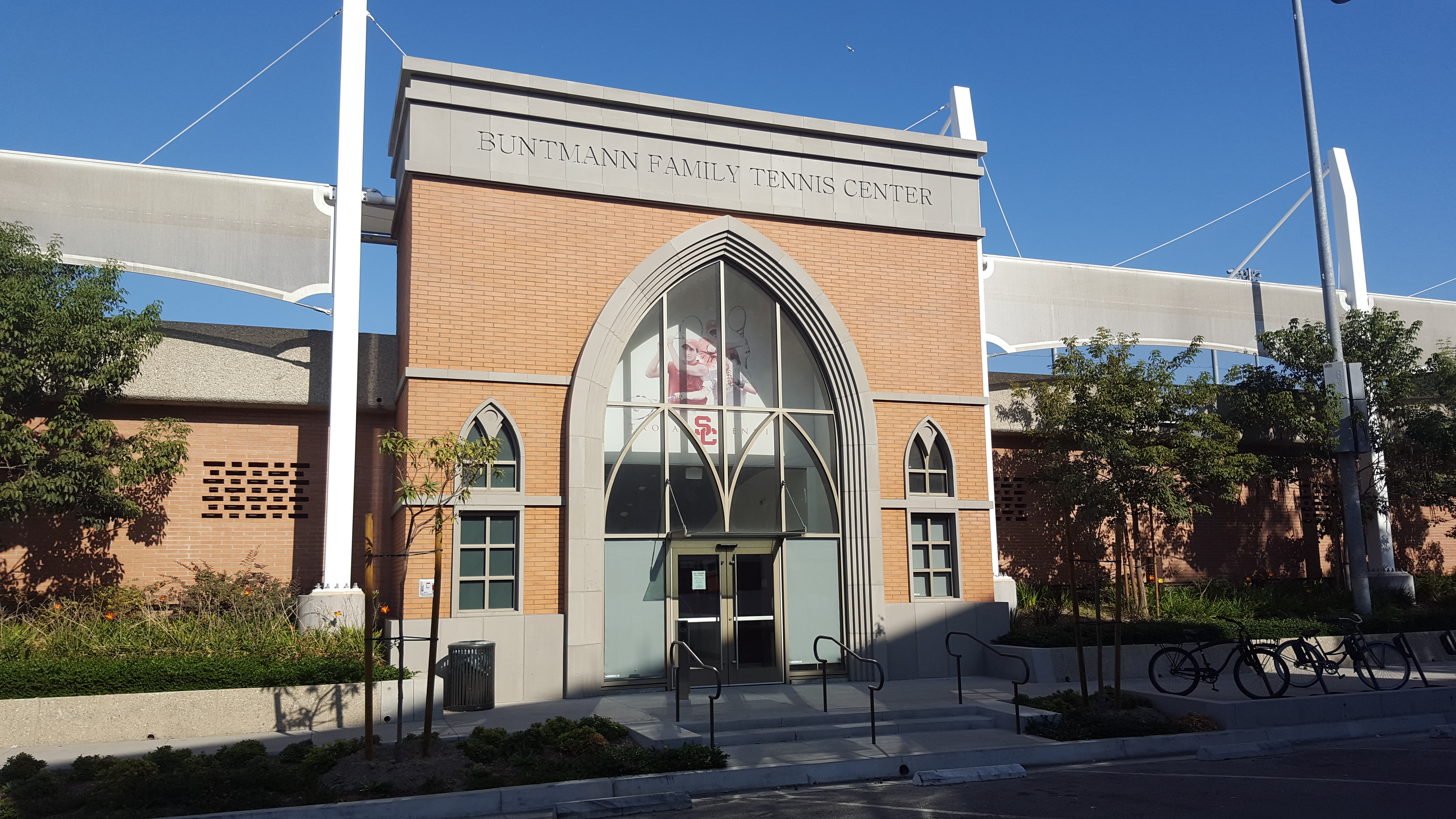
Marks Tennis Stadium-Buntmann Family Tennis Center

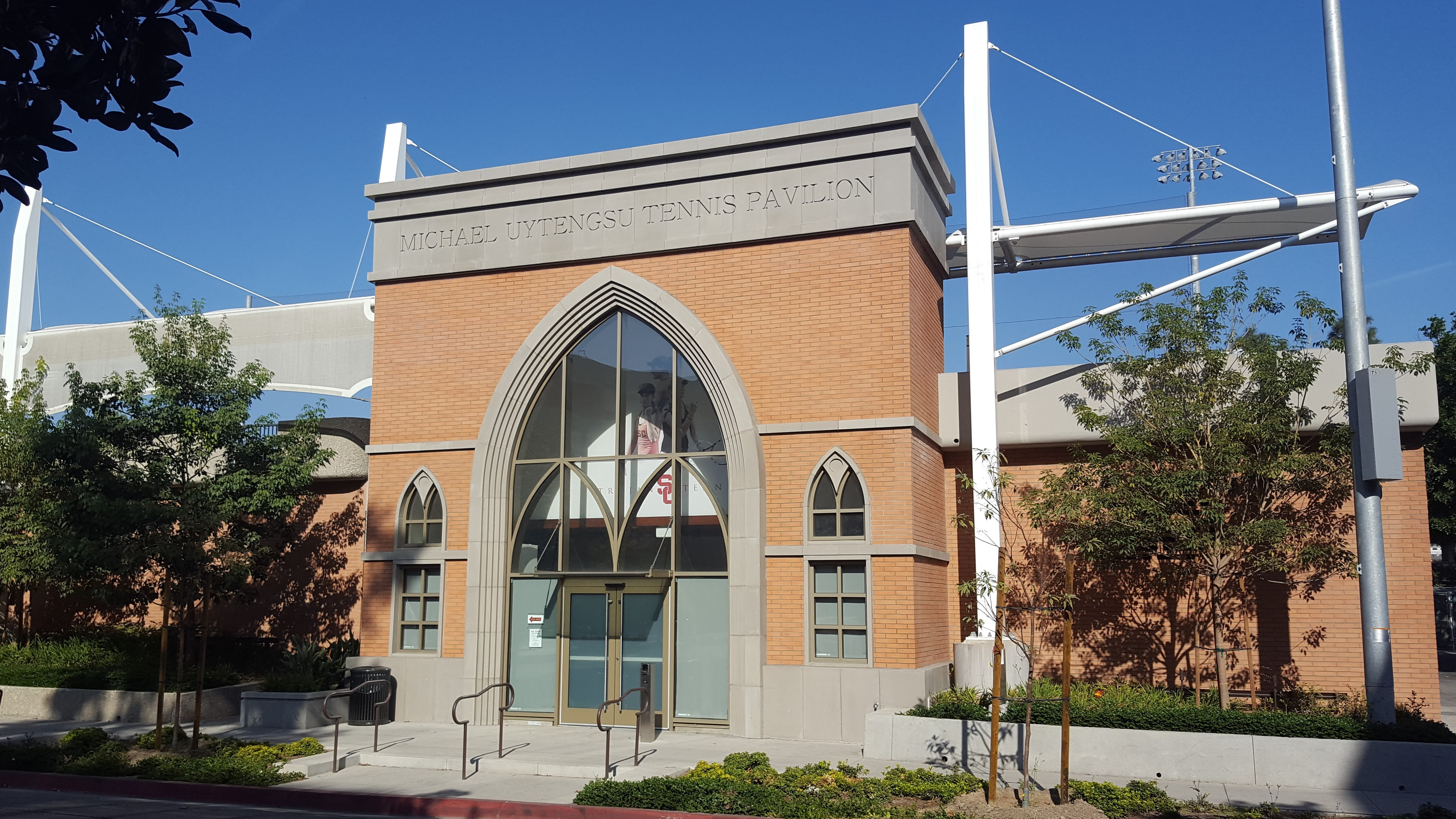
Marks Tennis Stadium-Michael Uytengsu Tennis Pavilion

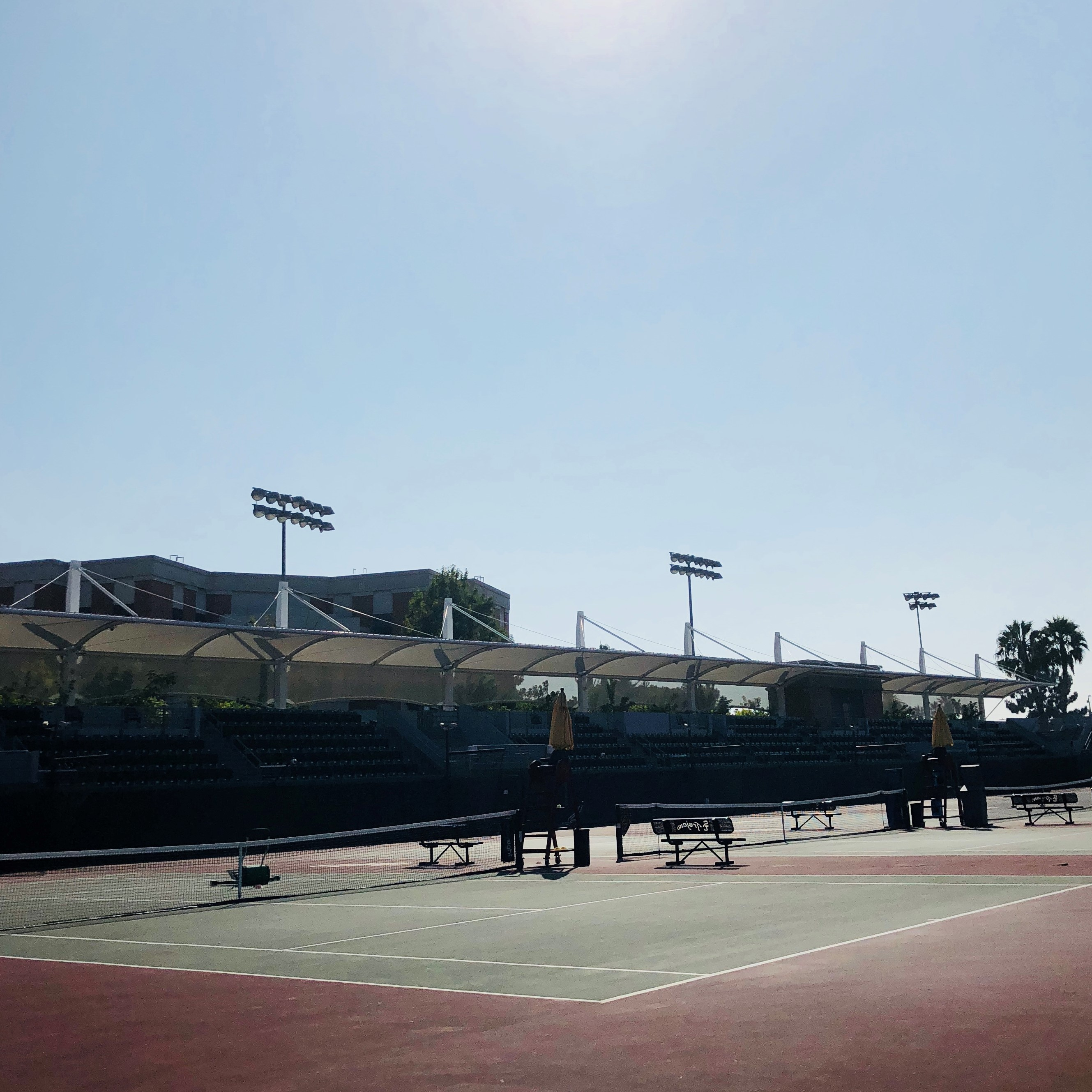
David X. Marks Tennis Stadium Courts
