= Jennifer Cohen (athletic director) =

Athletic director at the University of Southern California

Current position
- Title: Athletic director
- Team: USC
- Conference: Big Ten

Biographical details
- Born: August 22, 1969 (age 56); Arcadia, California, U.S.

Jennifer Lynn Cohen (née Smith; born 1969) is an American college sports administrator who currently serves as the athletic director at the University of Southern California (USC). Prior to this role, she served as the athletic director at the University of Washington from 2016 to 2023, and held athletics administration roles at Pacific Lutheran, Puget Sound, and Texas Tech.

== Personal life ==
Born in Arcadia, California, Cohen moved to Tacoma, Washington in the second grade. She attended high school at Curtis Senior High. After applying to the University of Washington and getting waitlisted, Cohen attended San Diego State University and graduated in 1991. She then went on to earn a master's degree in physical education with an emphasis in sports administration from Pacific Lutheran University in 1994.

Cohen is the mother of two sons, Tyson and Dylan, who are student athletes at Spokane Falls Community College and Montana, respectively.

== Career ==
Cohen began her career in sports administration as a Division III volleyball coach, where she took on extraneous roles as the "de facto strength-and-conditioning coach" and "the staff nutritionist" due to her school's small budget while writing to Division I athletic directors looking for a meeting or interview.

She continued at Texas Tech University as an intern in their athletics department, before later beginning her time in the athletic offices of the University of Washington in 1998.

On February 1, 2016, Cohen became interim athletic director at the University of Washington. She became the seventeenth athletic director of the University of Washington on May 25, 2016. At the time of her appointment, Cohen was one of just three female athletic directors in the Power Five conferences and the only female AD in the Pac-12.

On August 21, 2023 she accepted the athletic director position at USC. She was preceded by Mike Bohn.
