= Howard Jones Field/Brian Kennedy Field =

Sporting venue in the United States

Coordinates: 34.023023°N 118.288883°W

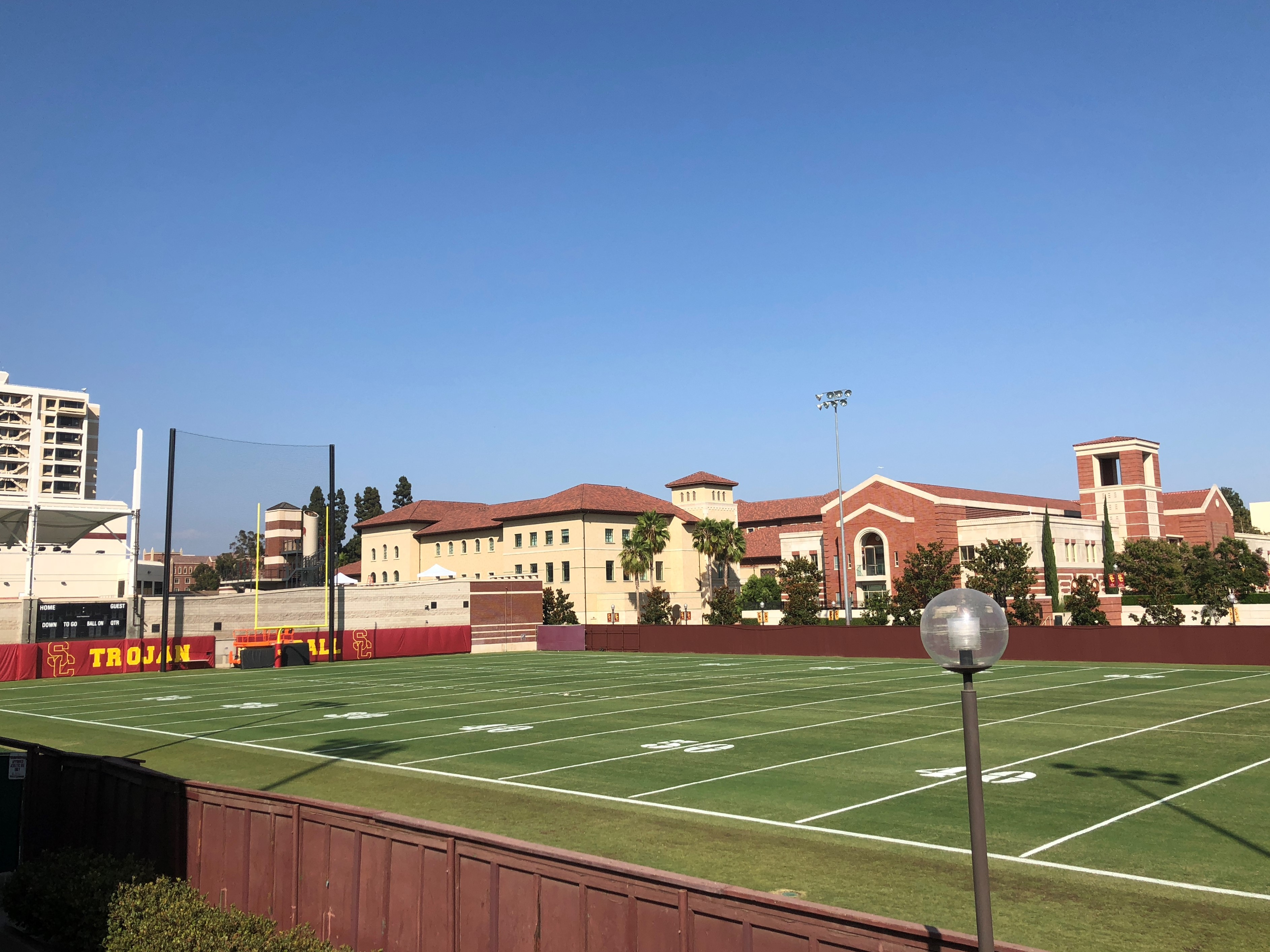
Howard Jones Field

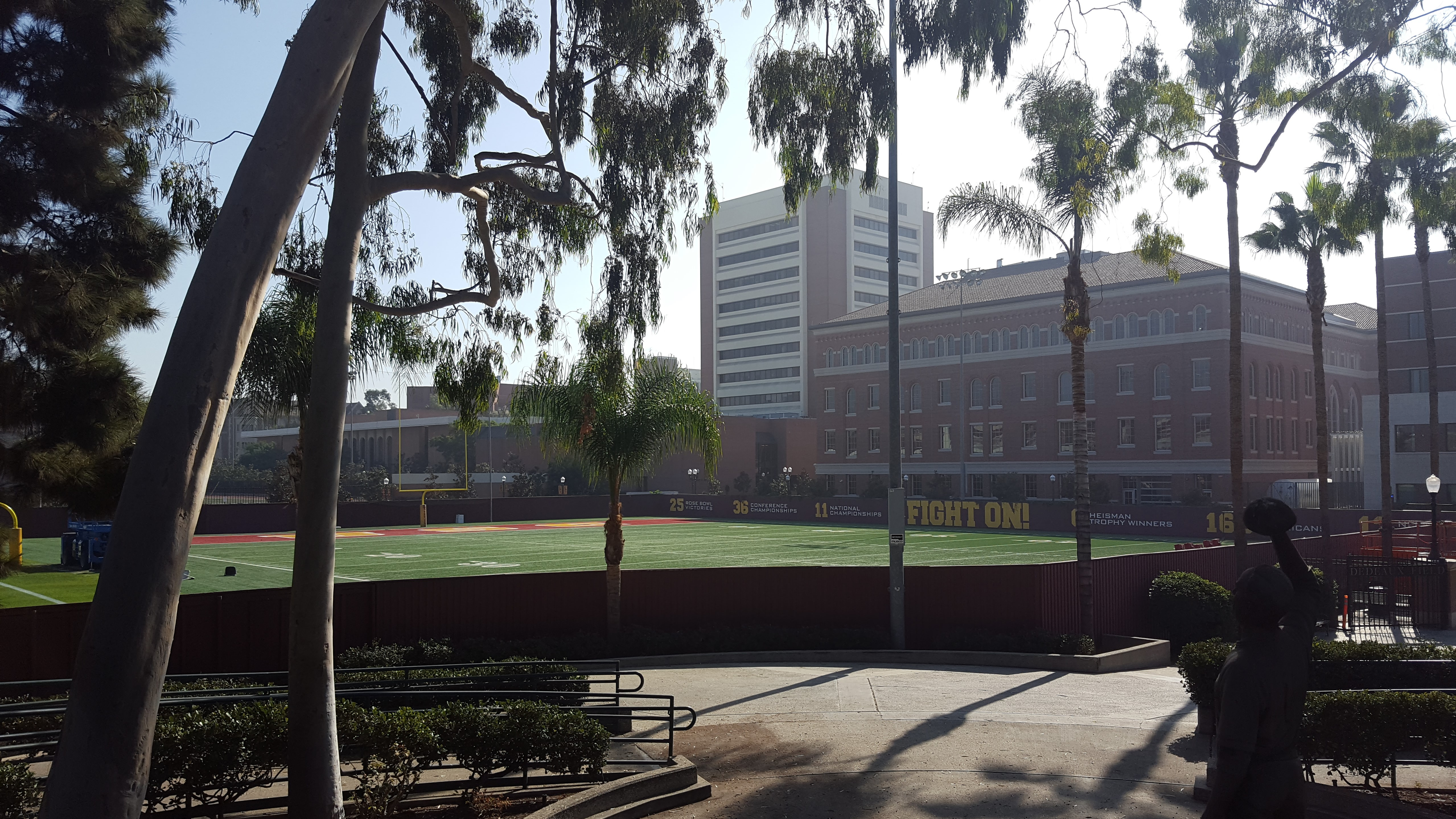
Brian Kennedy Field

Howard Jones Field/Brian Kennedy Field is the practice facility for the USC Trojans football team. Howard Jones Field is named after former USC head football coach, Howard Jones. The facility was expanded in the fall of 1998 to include Brian Kennedy Field. In early 1999, Goux's Gate — named after the late popular long-time former assistant coach Marv Goux — was erected at the entrance to the practice fields.
