= Mike Bohn =

American sports administrator (born 1960)

Biographical details
- Born: November 16, 1960 (age 66); Hinsdale, Illinois, U.S.

Playing career

Football
- 1982: Kansas

Baseball
- 1982–1983: Kansas
- Positions: Quarterback (football); Pitcher, first baseman, outfielder (baseball)

Coaching career (HC unless noted)

Football
- 1983–1984: Ohio (GA)

Administrative career (AD unless noted)
- 1984–1992: Air Force (assoc)
- 1992–1995: CFA (marketing)
- 1996–1998: Colorado State (assoc)
- 1998–2003: Idaho
- 2003–2005: San Diego State
- 2005–2013: Colorado
- 2014–2019: Cincinnati
- 2019–2023: USC

Accomplishments and honors

Awards
- 2008 Diversity in Athletics Award

Michael Robert Bohn (born November 16, 1960) is an American sports administrator. He served as the athletic director for the Idaho Vandals, San Diego State Aztecs, Colorado Buffaloes, Cincinnati Bearcats, and USC Trojans.

== Career ==
Born in Hinsdale, Illinois, Bohn's family moved to Boulder, Colorado, when he was a year old; he was a three-sport athlete at Boulder High School and graduated in 1979. At the University of Kansas in Lawrence, Bohn was a quarterback on the Jayhawks' football team in 1982, and was also on the baseball team in 1982 and 1983. He graduated with a Bachelor of Arts degree in 1983, and earned a master's degree in sports administration from Ohio University in 1984.

After more than five years as athletic director at Idaho, and eighteen months at San Diego State, Bohn was appointed at Colorado in 2005, succeeding Dick Tharp and Jack Lengyel (interim); his appointment was extended for a second five-year term in 2010. Hired at Cincinnati in 2014, he succeeded Whit Babcock.

Bohn was hired for the same role with the USC Trojans on November 11, 2019. He resigned on May 19, 2023.
