= USC Trojans =

Intercollegiate sports teams of the University of Southern California

- University: University of Southern California
- Nickname: Trojans
- NCAA: Division I (FBS)
- Conference: Big Ten (primary); MPSF (men's volleyball, water polo)
- Athletic director: Jennifer Cohen
- Location: Los Angeles, California
- Varsity teams: 23
- Football stadium: Los Angeles Memorial Coliseum
- Basketball arena: Galen Center
- Baseball stadium: Dedeaux Field
- Soccer stadium: Rawlinson Stadium
- Other venues: Felix Field and Loker Stadium; David X. Marks Tennis Stadium; Merle Norman Stadium; USC Boathouse; Uytengsu Aquatics Center
- Colors: Cardinal and gold
- Mascot: Traveler (official), Tommy Trojan (unofficial), George Tirebiter (previous)
- Fight song: Fight On
- Website: usctrojans.com

Big Ten logo in USC's colors

The USC Trojans (also Southern California Trojans) are the intercollegiate athletic teams that represent the University of Southern California (USC) in Los Angeles. While the men's teams are nicknamed the Trojans, the women's athletic teams are referred to as either the Trojans or Women of Troy (the university officially approves both terms). The program participates in the Big Ten Conference and has won 139 team national championships, 115 of which are National Collegiate Athletic Association (NCAA) national championships. USC's official colors are cardinal and gold.

The Trojans have a cross-town rivalry in several sports with UCLA. However, USC's football rivalry with Notre Dame predates the UCLA rivalry by three years. The Notre Dame rivalry stems mainly from the annual football game played between these two universities and is considered the greatest intersectional rivalry in college football. The Trojans also enjoy a rivalry with the Stanford Cardinal. The USC Trojans are considered one of the most successful college athletic programs.

== Overview ==
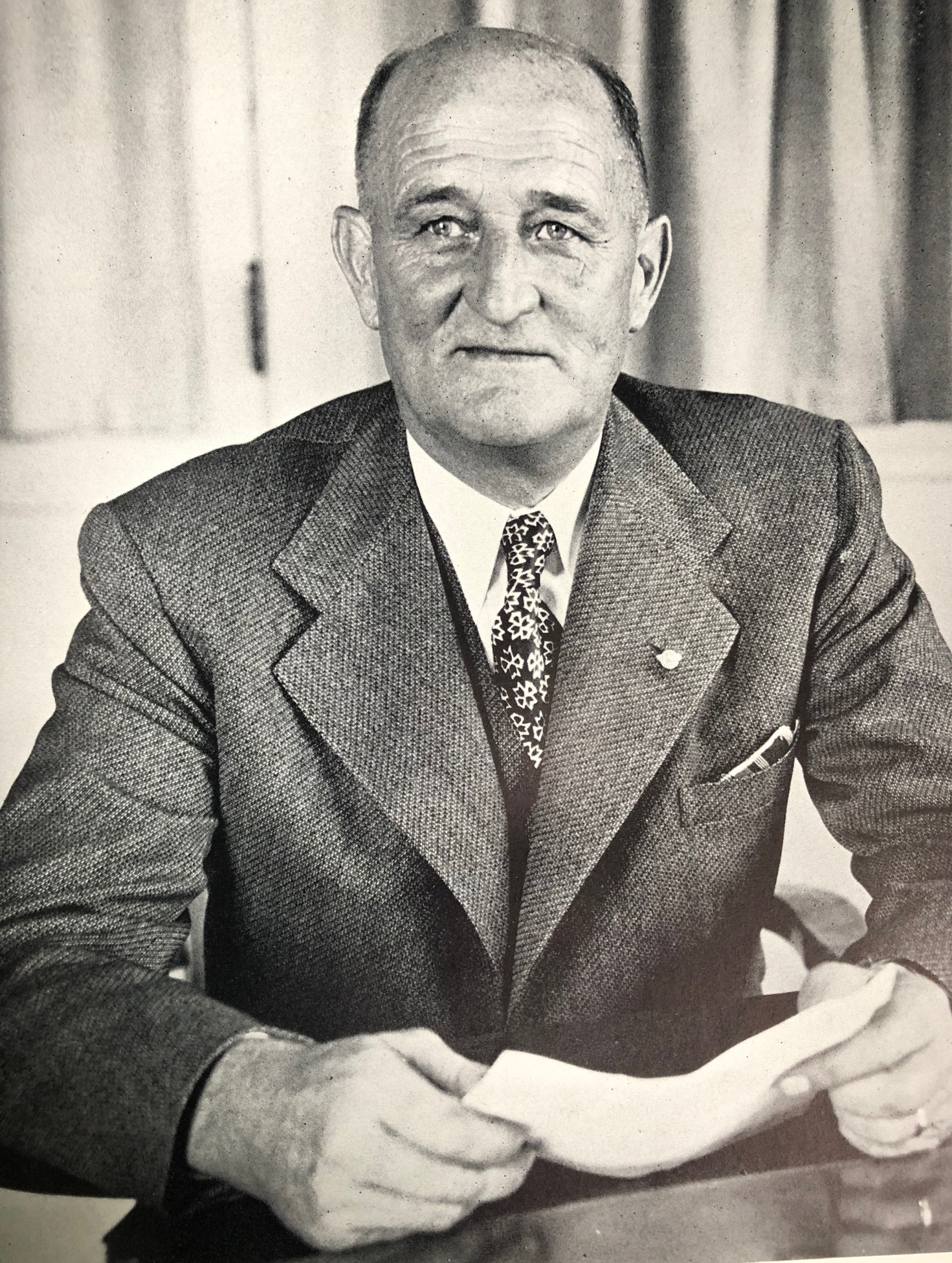
Willis O. Hunter, USC athletic director 1925–1957

- The Trojans have won 139 team national championships, 115 of which are NCAA National Championships. This is the third highest count of all universities behind UCLA and Stanford.
- The Trojan men have won 100 national championships (87 NCAA titles), more than any other university.
- The Women of Troy have earned 39 national championships (28 NCAA titles), third in the nation.
- The Trojans won at least 1 national team title in 26 consecutive years (1959–60 to 1984–85).
- USC won the National College All-Sports Championship an annual ranking by USA Today of the country's top athletic programs – 6 times since its inception in 1971.
- Trojan men athletes have won more individual NCAA titles (302) than those from any other school in the nation and the Women of Troy have brought home another 55 individual NCAA crowns for a combined 357 individual NCAA championships.
- Four Trojans have won the prestigious James E. Sullivan Award as the top amateur athlete in America: diver Sammy Lee (1953), shot putter Parry O'Brien (1959), swimmer John Naber (1977) and swimmer Janet Evans (1989).
- Two Trojans have won the Honda-Broderick Cup as the top collegiate woman athlete of the year: Cheryl Miller (1983–84) and Angela Williams (2001–02). And Trojan women have won 8 Honda Awards, as the top female athlete in their sport.

In March 2019 USC fired senior associate athletic director Donna Heinel (charged with receiving more than $1.3 million in bribes to fabricate athletic credentials of over two dozen students seeking admission to USC) and water polo coach Jovan Vavic (charged with receiving $250,000 in bribes) after they were indicted by federal prosecutors in the 2019 college admissions bribery scandal. Former women's soccer coach Ali Khosroshahin and former assistant women's soccer coach Laura Janke were also indicted, and charged with racketeering.

== Sports teams ==
Men's sports	Women's sports
Baseball	Basketball
Basketball	Beach volleyball
Football	Cross country
Golf	Golf
Swimming and diving	Lacrosse
Tennis	Rowing
Track and field^{†}	Soccer
Volleyball	Swimming and diving
Water polo	Tennis
	Track and field^{†}
	Volleyball
	Water polo
† – Track and field includes both indoor and outdoor.

USC sponsors teams in ten men's and thirteen women's NCAA sanctioned sports.

=== Football ===
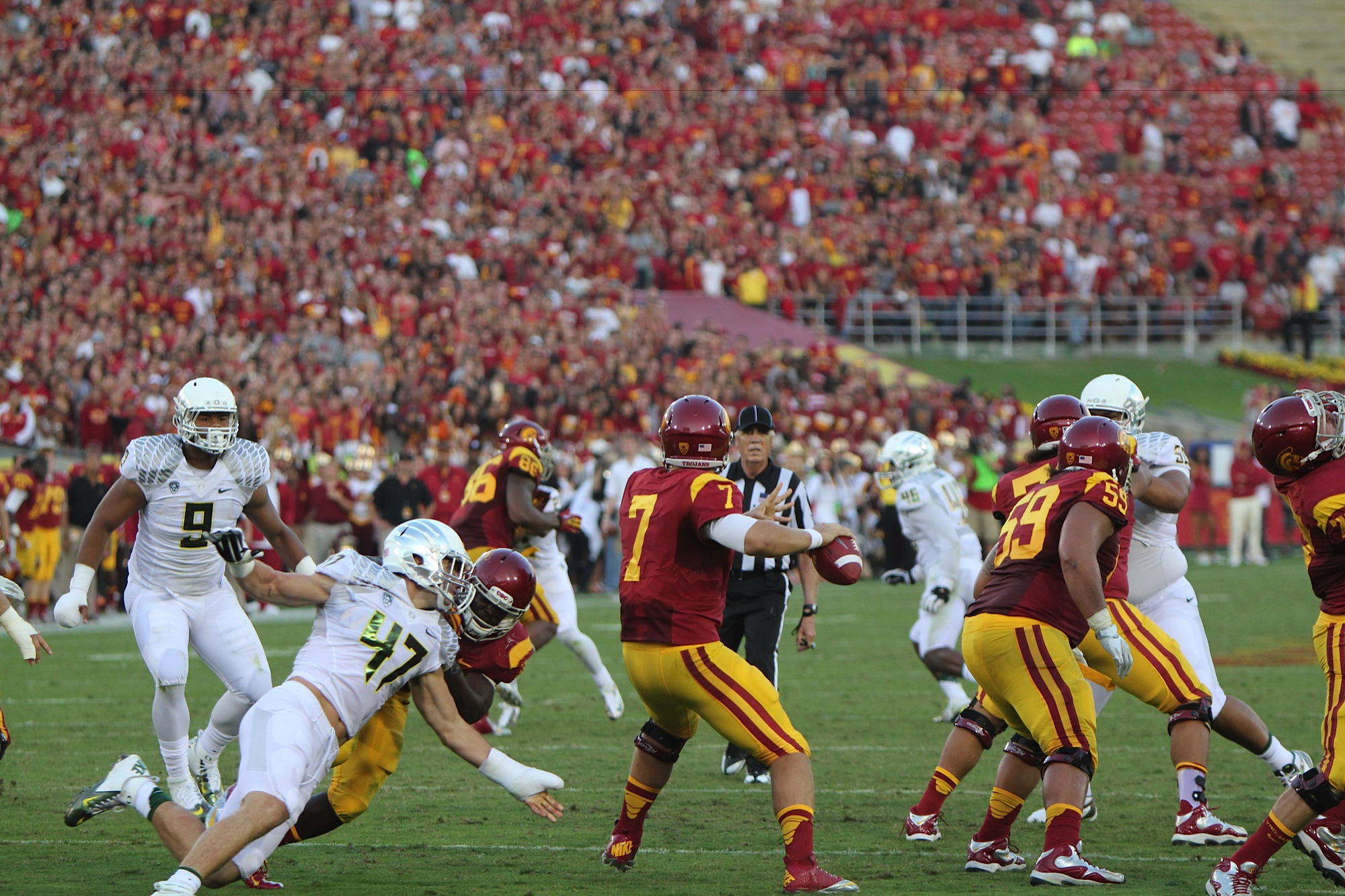
USC v Oregon game in 2012

The USC Trojans football program started in 1888 and has amassed an all-time win–loss record of 793–313–54, giving the program a .707 winning percentage. A December 1998 SPORT magazine ranking listed USC as the No. 4 all-time college football program of the 20th century. In 2009 ESPN ranked USC the second best program in college football history.

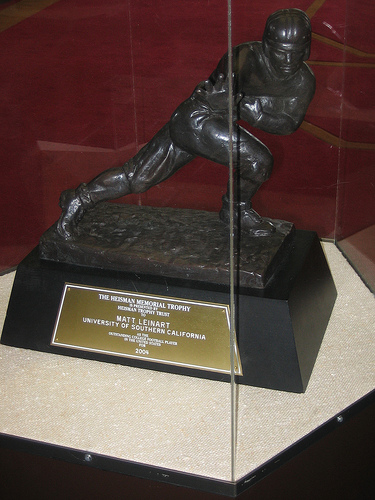
Matt Leinart's Heisman Trophy

The USC football team has been voted National Champions 11 times. USC is also known for its Heisman Trophy winners. USC has the most Heisman winners at 8. Three of the four Heisman winners from 2002 to 2005 were Trojans - Carson Palmer in 2002, Matt Leinart in 2004 and Reggie Bush in 2005.

Four other Trojans tailbacks have won the coveted Heisman Trophy as college football's outstanding player: Mike Garrett in 1965, O. J. Simpson in 1968, Charles White in 1979 and Marcus Allen in 1981. Also notable, USC has 12 players in the Pro Football Hall of Fame, more than any other university. USC's record against opponents from the old Pac-10 is 367–153–29 (.695), and the Trojans have winning records against all nine other members. As of 2017, 501 Trojans have been taken in the NFL draft, more than any other university.

Since 1959, the Trojans have won the conference championship 18 times and tied for the title on 6 other occasions. USC has the nation's best bowl winning percentage (.660) among the 65 schools which have made at least 10 bowl appearances and its 34 Rose Bowl appearances is an all-time best. USC players have been named first team All-American 17 times, with 8 consensus selections and 2 unanimous choices. Football record does "not including 9 overall wins vacated due to NCAA penalty, including 2 vs. UCLA and 1 each vs. WSU, ARIZ, STAN, ORE, CAL, ASU, WASH".

=== Baseball ===
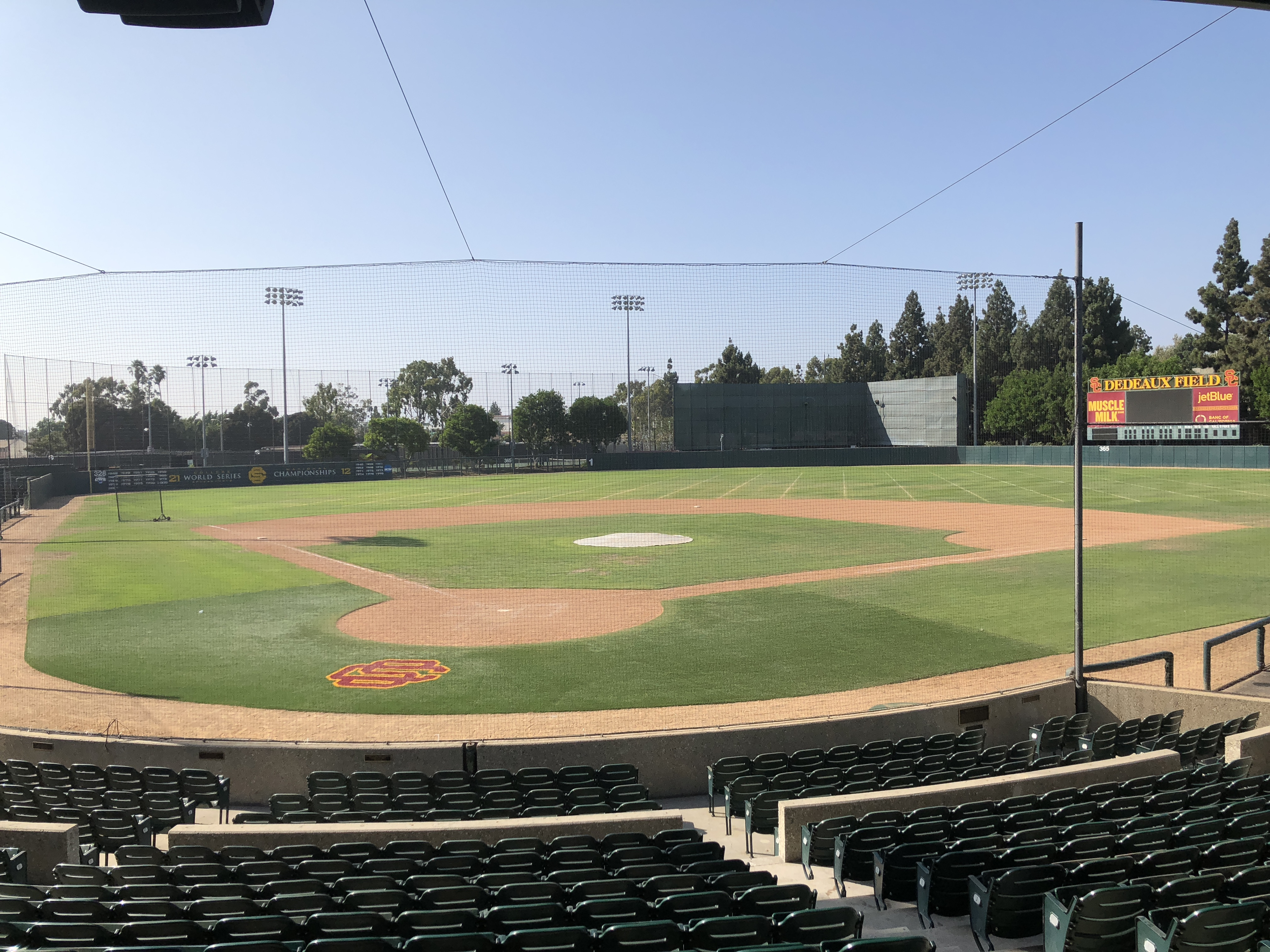
Dedeaux Field

The USC Trojans baseball program has a notable history in baseball: With 12 baseball national championships, the Trojans are far and away the leader in that category (no other school has more than 6). Since starting baseball in 1924, the Trojans have compiled a record of 2,221-1,093-15 (.669) against college opponents, and have captured outright or tied for 38 conference championships. USC's most notable baseball coach was Rod Dedeaux, coaching from 1942 to 1986, who led the school to 11 of its NCAA crowns, including 5 straight from 1970 to 1974.

USC has produced many major league players, including Ron Fairly, Don Buford, Tom Seaver, Dave Kingman, Fred Lynn, Roy Smalley, Steve Kemp, Mark McGwire, Randy Johnson, Bret Boone, Jeff Cirillo, Barry Zito, Geoff Jenkins, Kent Hadley, Aaron Boone, Jacque Jones and Mark Prior. In total, 100 Trojans have gone on to play in the major leagues and scores more in the minors.

=== Basketball ===
==== Men's basketball ====
The USC Trojans men's basketball program has a long tradition. The men's program is only one of about 48 schools which have more than 1,000 victories in college basketball. Since starting basketball in 1907, the Trojans have compiled a record of 1,357–984 (.580), winning 14 league championships. Recently, the 2007 team set a school record for most wins in a season and advanced to the Sweet Sixteen in the NCAA tournament. The university recently announced major sanctions over player O. J. Mayo's receipt of improper benefits during the 2007–2008 season. Notably, USC has vacated all regular season wins during that season, dropping their record for the 2007–2008 season to 1-32. In 2021, the Men of Troy made the Elite Eight

==== Women's basketball ====
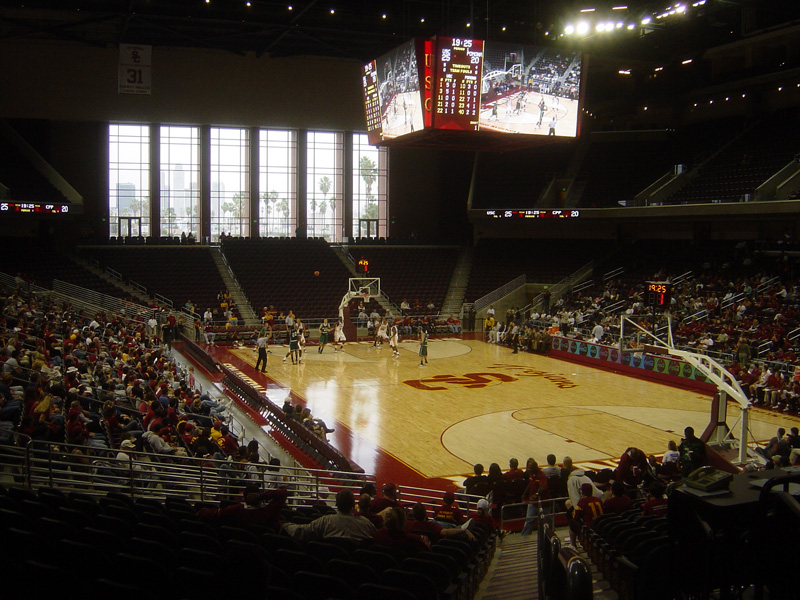
Galen Center - The Los Angeles Skyline visible through the north windows.

The USC Trojans women's basketball program, after improving steadily, first reached the pinnacle of success in women's basketball in 1983 and the Trojans have been near the top almost ever since, winning national championships in 1983 and 1984 and playing in four Final Fours.

The Women of Troy have made the NCAA tourney 6 of the past 14 years, including advancing to the regionals 3 times. Lisa Leslie, who became an Olympic and pro star, won the Naismith Award in 1994 (she was the MVP of the first WNBA All-Star Game). Tina Thompson was the No. 1 pick in the 1997 WNBA draft. Cynthia Cooper was twice an Olympian and WNBA MVP. In 2009, USC hired Mary Wooley as their assistant coach for women's basketball.

=== Women's beach volleyball ===
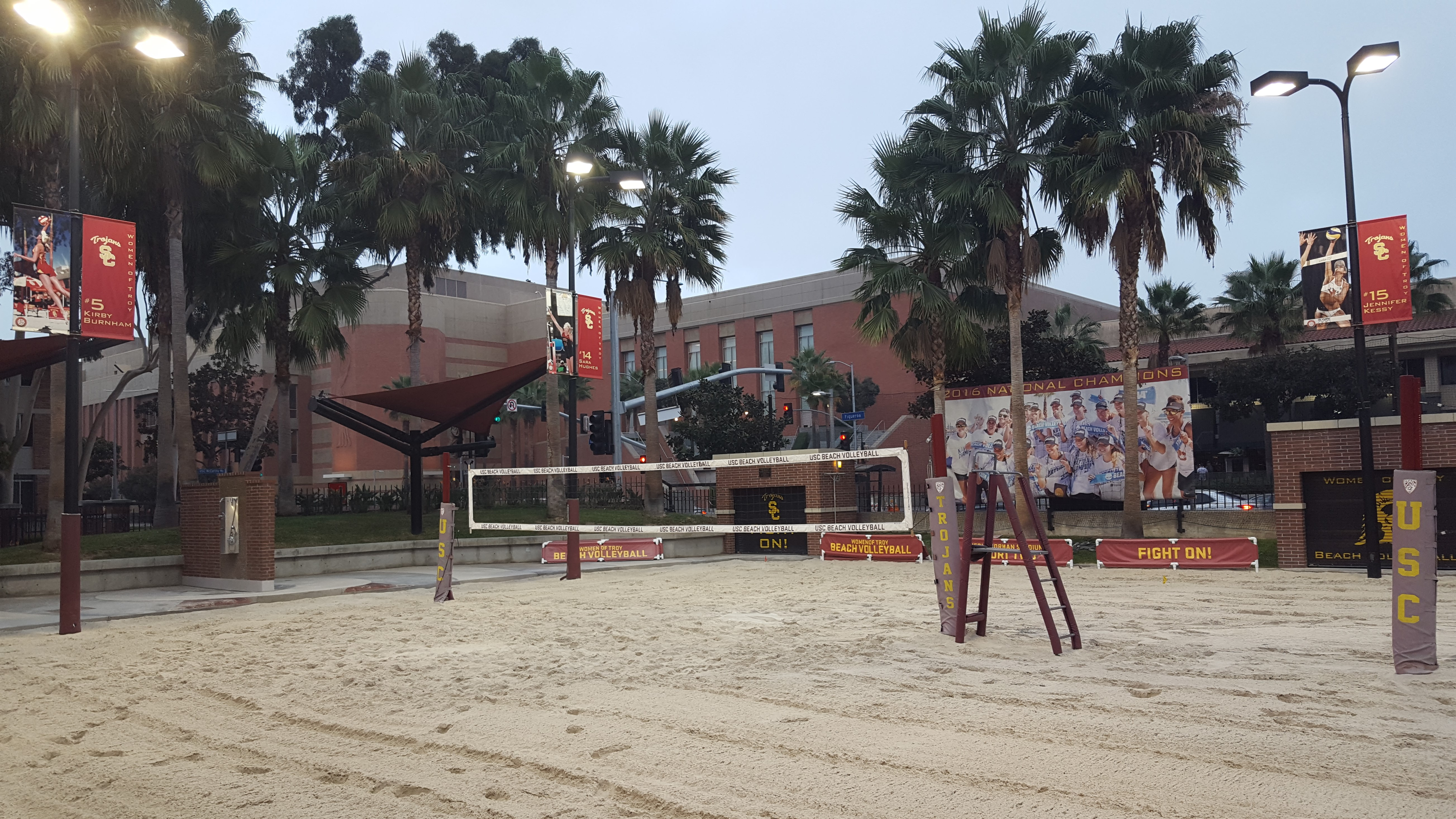
Merle Norman Stadium

The USC Trojans women's beach volleyball team, a women-only sport at the collegiate level, first became a varsity sport in the 2012 season (2011–12 school year). At the time, the NCAA considered it an "emerging sport" for women, recognizing it as an official sport but not conducting an official championship.

Through the 2015 season, national championship play was conducted by the American Volleyball Coaches Association (AVCA). The Trojans won an AVCA national team title in 2015, with a USC team claiming the AVCA pairs championship in each of the 2013–2015 seasons.

The NCAA began sponsoring an official national championship in 2016 (only a team competition; no pairs); USC won the inaugural NCAA title and defended the championship in 2017.

The beach volleyball program's only head coach has been Anna Collier, a former three-sport USC athlete (including indoor volleyball) who has posted a career record of 142–15 (.904) through the 2017 season.

=== Golf ===
==== Men's golf ====
Coach Stan Wood (1955–79) compiled a career record of 462–37 (.926) and won 14 conference championships. He also guided the Trojans to an NCAA record 51 consecutive dual match wins from 1956 to 1959. His teams finished third in the NCAA tourney six times. Ron Rhoads, a former USC all-American golfer, coached from 1980 to 1983. Under coach Randy Lein (1984–92), USC continued its success, winning the conference championship in 1986. The 1991 Trojans finished seventh at the NCAAs. Former team captain Jim Empey took over as coach in 1993. Kurt Schuette became coach in 1995 and guided USC to a fifth-place finish at the NCAA tourney that season, Troy's best placing in 18 years, and then ninth in 1996, 14th in both 1997 and 2003 and sixth in 2005. His 2001 squad won the Pac-10 title, USC's first since 1986, and Troy repeated in 2002.

Three USC golfers have won four NCAA individual championships: Scott Simpson in 1976 and 1977, Ron Commans in 1981, and Jamie Lovemark in 2007. Their best team finish is third place in 1958, 1961, 1964, 1965, 1966, 1975, and 2008. The team has won 20 Pac-12 championships: 1962, 1964–1967, 1969, 1971–1973, 1975, 1976 (south division), 1978, 1980, 1984, 1986, 2001–2002, 2007, 2011, and 2018.

1985 U.S. Amateur champion Sam Randolph, who finished as low amateur at the Masters Tournament in 1985 and 1986, was a first-team All-American for the third straight year in 1986 and was named college golf's Player of the Year. Kevin Stadler was the 2002 Pac-10 Golfer of the Year (USC's first honoree since 1986).

Trojan golfers who have found success at the professional level include Al Geiberger (11 PGA Tour wins including 1966 PGA Championship), Brian Henninger (2 PGA Tour wins), John Jacobs (1 Japan Golf Tour win), Bob McCallister (2 PGA Tour wins), Mark Pfeil (1 PGA Tour win), Sam Randolph (1 PGA Tour win), Tony Sills (1 PGA Tour win), Scott Simpson (7 PGA Tour wins including 1987 U.S. Open), Craig Stadler (13 PGA Tour wins including 1982 Masters Tournament), Kevin Stadler (1 PGA Tour win and 1European Tour win), and Dave Stockton (10 PGA Tour wins including 1970 and 1976 PGA Championships).

==== Women's golf ====
The USC women's golf team's first-ever NCAA team title in 2003, their second in 2008, and their third in 2013. USC also has had second (twice), third, fourth (twice), fifth, seventh (3 times), ninth, 11th, 12th and 14th-place finishes at the NCAA Championships in the past 21 years. The Women of Troy won the Pac-10 tourney in 1989 and the NCAA Regional in 1999 and 2006. Cathy Bright led USC to 5 Top 10 NCAA finishes in her 12 years as head coach (1982–93). Former Trojan player Renee (Mack) Baumgartner returned as head coach in 1994 and led USC to second place at the NCAAs in her first year. Andrea Gaston took over in 1997 (with men's coach Kurt Schuette serving as Director of Golf) and guided USC to 6 NCAA Top 10 finishes, including the 2003 NCAA title. The team has won 8 Pac-12 championships: 1989, 2008, 2011, 2013, 2016, 2019, 2021 & 2023.

Jennifer Rosales won the 1998 NCAA individual title as a freshman, Mikaela Parmlid won as a senior in 2003, Dewi Claire Schreefel as a sophomore in 2006, Annie Park as a freshman in 2013, and Doris Chen as a junior in 2014. Other top individuals have included Marta Figueras-Dotti, Denise Strebig, Kim Saiki, Tracy Nakamura, Jill McGill (the 1993 U.S. Amateur champion), Heidi Voorhees (the 1993 U.S. Amateur medalist), Jennifer Biehn (the 1994 Pac-10 champ), Candie Kung (the 2000 Pac-10 champ), Becky Lucidi (the 2002 U.S. Amateur and 2003 Mexican Amateur champion) and Irene Cho.

USC captured the 2008 NCAA Women's Golf Championship at the par 72, 6,424-yard (5,874 m) University of New Mexico Championship Golf Course. The Trojans won the event by six strokes over UCLA and claimed their first women's golf national championship since 2003. In 2013, they won by 21 strokes over Duke University at the University of Georgia Golf Course (par 72, 6,372-yard (5,827 m)).

=== Women's rowing ===
The women's rowing team, based at the USC Boathouse, has been active since the early 1970s, but scholarships were first awarded in 1998 and USC has emerged as one of the nation's top programs. The varsity, junior varsity and novice eight teams train all year long for regattas from coast to coast. George Jenkins guided USC to national prominence during his 9 years as head coach (1994–2002). Kelly Babraj took over as head coach for the 2003 season, with husband Zenon Babraj serving as director of rowing.

At the 1998 NCAA meet, the Women of Troy rowers [Lisa Bartoli (c), Evalina Boteva, Annelisa Gross, Kasey Ryan, Rebecca Moneymaker] captured their first-ever national championship race in the varsity four+. In 2005, USC made its first-ever NCAA Championships appearance as a team, placing 11th.

=== Women's soccer ===
The women's soccer team began competing in 1993 and calls McAlister Field home. Karen Stanley coached the team for the first three seasons. Jim Millinder took over in 1996 and guided seven of his squads (1998–2003) into the NCAA tourney (USC won the 1998 Pac-10 title).

Isabelle Harvey, the 1998 Pac-10 Player of the Year, was USC's first All-American first teamer (in 2000).

On December 7, 2007, 2-seed USC defeated 1-seed UCLA by a score of 2–1 to reach the College Cup final for the first time in its history. USC had never previously passed the second round in the NCAA tournament before the 2007–2008 season. The Trojans won the national title on December 9, 2007, with a 2–0 win over Florida State University.

Since 2014 the head coach has been Keidane McAlpine.

On December 4, 2016, USC defeated West Virginia 3–1 to win their second NCAA Championship. USC forward Katie Johnson was named the outstanding offensive player of the tournament.

=== Swimming and diving ===
==== Men's swimming and diving ====
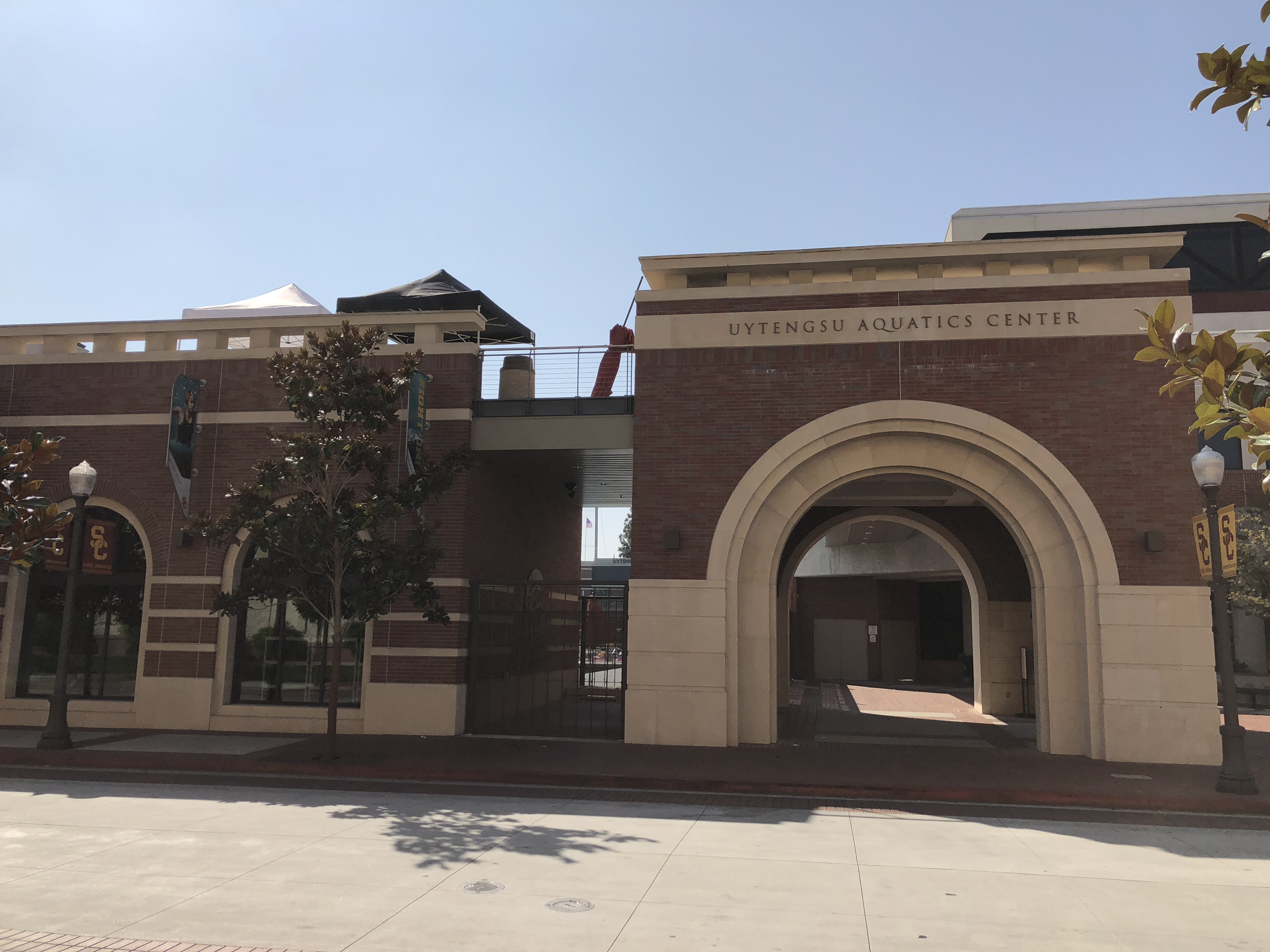
Uytengsu Aquatics Center

The type of dominance USC has had in this sport was best exemplified by Troy's performance in the 1976 Olympic Games, when Trojan swimmers won more golds and more total medals than any country in swimming except the United States.

Over the years, USC men's swimmers have made Olympic teams 122 times, winning 38 gold, 23 silver and 18 bronze medals. Gold medal winners have included Lenny Krayzelburg, John Naber, Bruce Furniss, Murray Rose, Wally Wolf, and Oussama Mellouli.

Since beginning swimming in 1929, the Trojans have captured 9 NCAA championships, all under coach Peter Daland, who retired in 1992 after 35 years at Troy. USC swimmers and divers have won 110 NCAA meet individual and relay titles (including Erik Vendt, who won 5 individual titles in the 2000, 2002 and 2003 meets) and have earned All-American honors an amazing 562 times. Under Daland, USC won 17 Pac-10 championships and amassed an impressive dual meet record of 318-31-1 (.917). Three of his last 6 squads had runner-up finishes at the NCAA meet.

Four-time U.S. Olympic coach Mark Schubert, winner of 2 NCAA titles with the Texas women, succeeded Daland (he also served as the head coach of the Women of Troy). His men's teams placed in the Top-10 at the NCAAs 12 times in his 14 years at USC. Dave Salo was named head coach following for Schubert in both roles in 2007.

==== Women's swimming and diving ====
The USC women's swimming and diving team have finished in the top 10 nationally 25 of the last 30 years, won the NCAA title in 1997, and have produced 233 All-Americans in that span. They have won conference championships in 1979, 1980, 1982 and 1985.

Among USC's more famous women's swimmers are Kristine Quance (who won 9 NCAA titles), Lindsay Benko (who won 5 NCAA titles), Katinka Hosszú (who won 3 NCAA titles), Kaitlin Sandeno (she won 2 races at the 2003 NCAAs), Michelle Ford, Sue Habernigg, Cynthia Woodhead, Sue Hinderaker, Debbie Rudd, Kalyn Keller and diver Blythe Hartley (who won 5 NCAA titles).

=== Tennis ===
==== Men's tennis ====
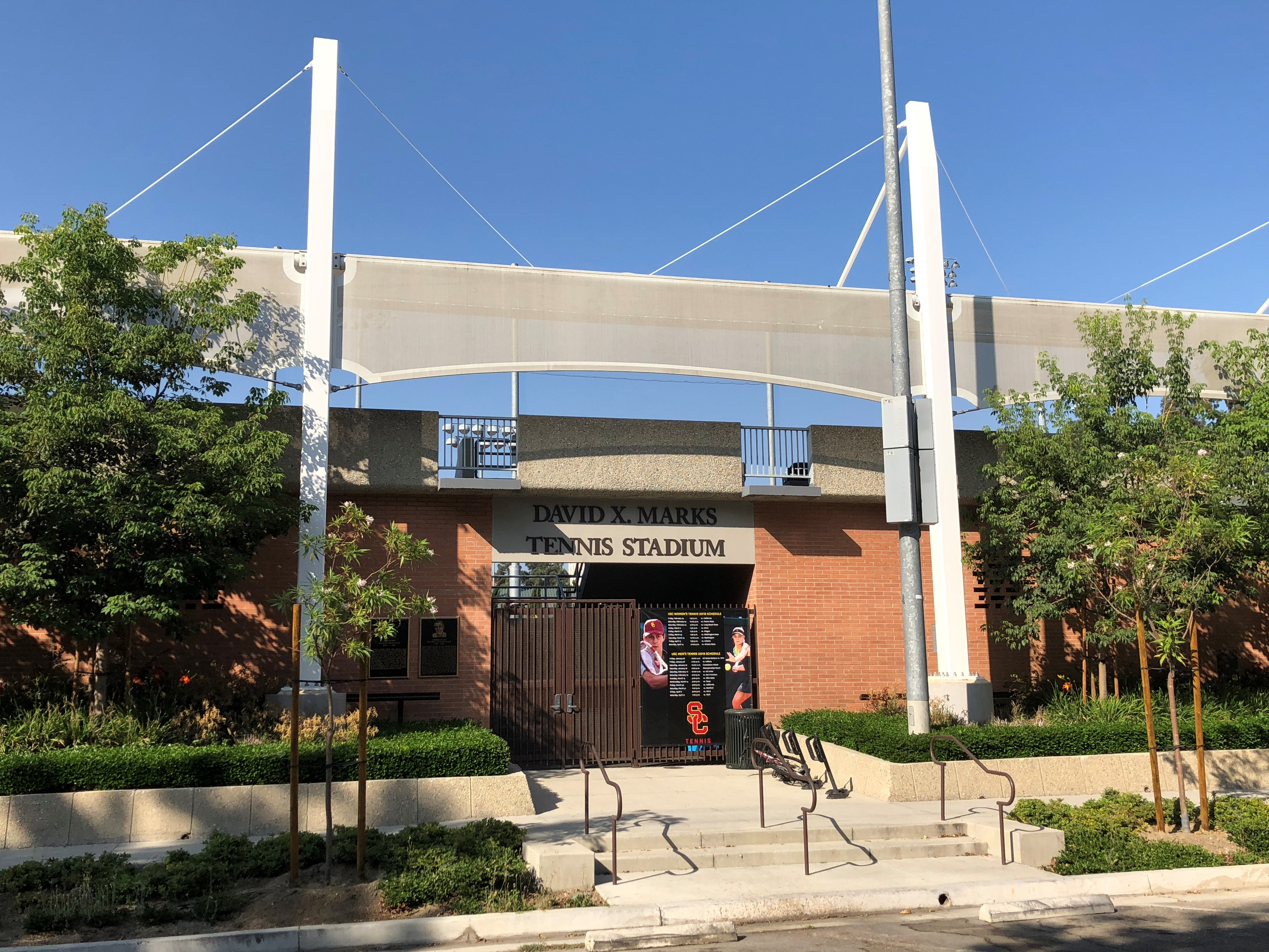
David X. Marks Tennis Stadium

George Toley (1954–80) guided the Trojans for 26 years before resigning during the 1980 season. His career record was 430-92-4 (.821) with 10 NCAA titles. Dick Leach succeeded Toley and posted a 535-133 (.801) mark in 23 years. His 1991, 1993, 1994 and 2002 teams won the NCAA tourney (his 2002 No. 11-seeded Cinderella team was the lowest seed ever to win the NCAA title and did so a month after Leach announced his retirement) and 8 of his other teams finished fourth or better. He was succeeded by ex-Pepperdine, Fresno State and Long Beach State coach Peter Smith for the 2003 season. His 2009, 2010, 2011, 2012 and 2014 teams have won the National Championship.

Overall, USC players have been named to All-American teams 137 times, with many also enjoying successful pro careers, including International Tennis Hall of Famers Stan Smith, Rafael Osuna, Alex Olmedo and Dennis Ralston, as well as Bob Lutz, Raul Ramirez, Butch Walts and Joaquin Loyo Mayo. In 2012, Steve Johnson, Senior, completed his USC career having won 72 consecutive singles matches. Johnson was a back-to-back NCAA Singles Champion from 2011 to 2012 and has a career-high ATP ranking of 21. Daniel Cukierman, from November 13, 2019, until the close of competition in 2020, was ranked No. 1 in the US in singles among men's college tennis players in the 2019-20 Intercollegiate Tennis Association (ITA) Division I Men's Individual National Rankings.

==== Women's tennis ====
Those national crowns all came under Dave Borelli, who coached USC from 1974 to 1988. In duals, Borelli's record was phenomenal: his teams went 300-43 (.875).

Five times Trojans have won national singles titles, along with a doubles champ and 74 All-Americans. Prominent USC stars have included Barbara Hallquist, Lea Antonoplis, Sheila McInerney, Stacy Margolin, Anna-Maria Fernandez, Cecilia Fernandez-Parker, Kelly Henry, Beth Herr, Jewel Peterson, Lindsey Nelson, Maria Sanchez, and Sabrina Santamaria.

Cheryl Woods, a former Trojan player, took over for Borelli in 1989. Richard Gallien, a player and coach at Pepperdine, became head coach in 1996. His 1999, 2000, 2001, 2003 and 2005 teams advanced to the NCAA quarterfinals and he got to the NCAA semi-finals in 2006.

=== Track and field ===
==== Men's track and field ====
The Trojans have won an unprecedented 27 NCAA titles (including 9 straight, 1935–43) in the 85-year history of NCAA outdoor track, plus 3 indoor NCAA titles and 35 Pacific Coast or Pac-10 crowns, including a string of 15 straight (1936–55). They have had 39 unbeaten and untied seasons, including a string of 16 in a row (1946–61). Since starting track and field in 1900, USC has compiled a dual-meet record of 410-116-4 (.777).

Outstanding coaches include Dean Cromwell (1909–48), who won a record 12 NCAA titles and had a dual meet mark of 109–48–1; Jess Mortensen, who never lost a dual meet (64–0) in 11 years and won 7 NCAA titles; and Vern Wolfe, who retired after the 1984 season with 7 national titles and a dual meet record of 106-17-1 (.859). Jim Bush, who won 5 NCAA titles while at crosstown rival UCLA, became USC's head coach in 1991. His 1992 Trojans finished third at the NCAAs with only a 6-man team. Ron Allice, who won 11 state titles at Long Beach City College, took over the combined men's and women's programs in 1995 (the men were fourth at the 1995 NCAA meet, 10th in 1996, third in 1997 while winning the Pac-10 title, seventh in 1998, fifth in 1999 while winning the Pac-10 crown, tied for seventh in 2000 while winning the Pac-10 title, tied for 12th in 2001, tied for 11th in 2002, third in 2003 while winning the Pac-10 title, sixth in 2005 while winning the NCAA West Regional crown and tied for ninth in 2006 while winning the Pac-10 and NCAA West Regional meets).

Sixty USC tracksters have won 88 places on U.S. Olympic teams over the years, including World War II hero Louis Zamperini. Trojans have won 26 individual Olympic titles and shared in 8 relay wins. Gold medal winners include long jumper Randy Williams, pole vaulter Bob Seagren, sprinter Charles Paddock, sprinter Quincy Watts and hurdler Félix Sánchez.

Since 1912, 61 USC track men have equaled or bettered world records, and there have been 110 NCAA outdoor individual or relay winners from Troy—including 2005 and 2006 NCAA high jump champ Jesse Williams (he also won indoors both years).

The Trojans also have a long history of successful distance running, including 9 Olympians and NCAA champions Julio Marin and Ole Oleson.

In 2018, Michael Norman became the first from USC to win The Bowerman, an award that honors collegiate track & field's most outstanding athlete of the year.

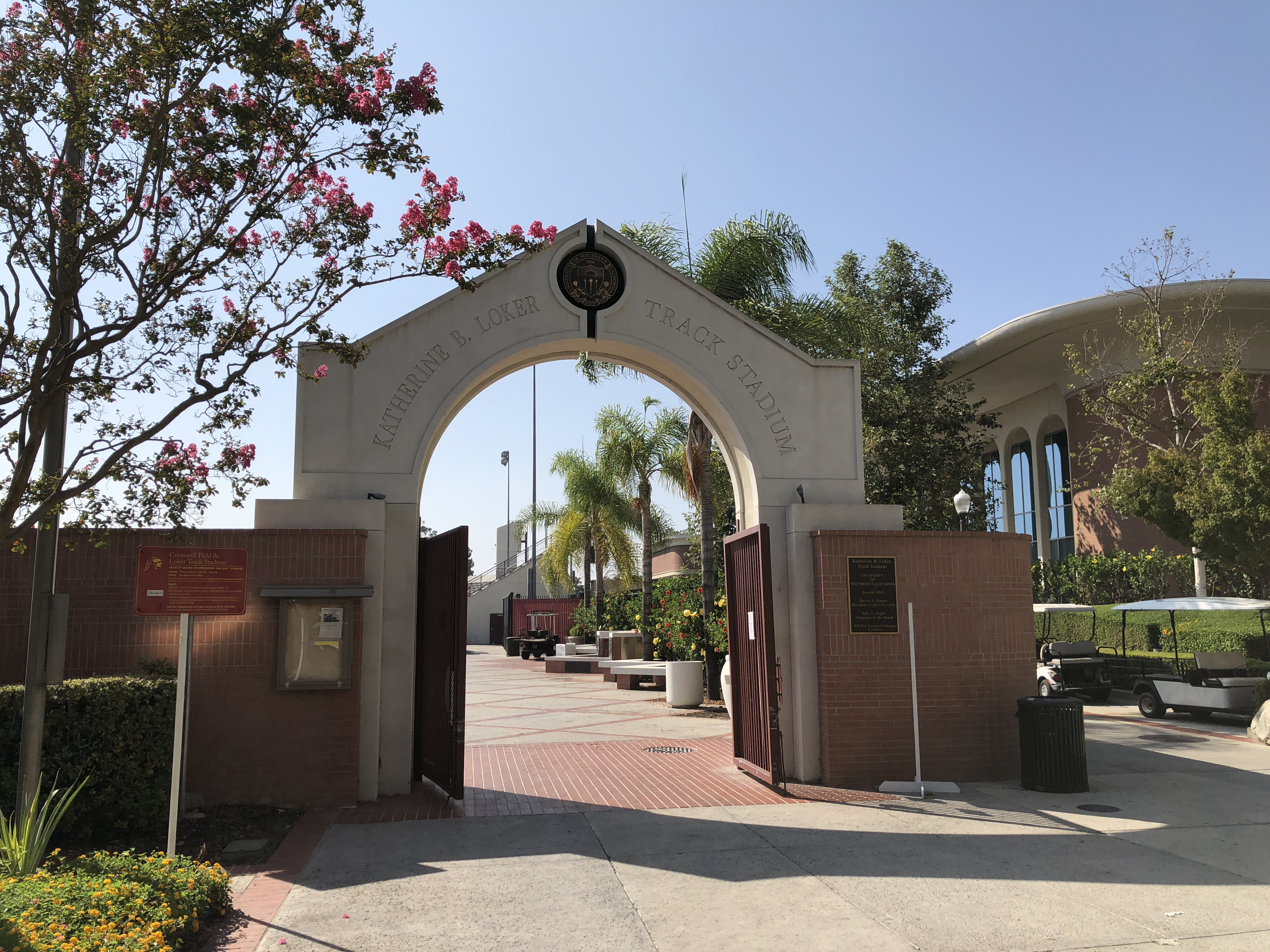
Cromwell Field and Loker Stadium

==== Women's track and field, cross country ====
Lillian Copeland, who received a B.A. in 1928, competed for the Trojans in track and field. She became an Olympic champion in discus throw, and set world records in discus, javelin, and shot put. She was also the first Trojan woman in Olympics. She joined the USC track & field team in 1924. While at USC, she won every track event she entered.

The women's track program at USC has developed into one of the nation's finest. The Trojans have placed in the Top 10 of the NCAA Championships 12 times, including winning the program's first-ever NCAA team title in 2001. The Women of Troy also finished third in 1987, seventh in 1996 (while winning the Pac-10 title), fifth in 1998, third in 1999 (just 4 points from first place), second in 2000 (again just 4 points out of first place), third in 2002, seventh in 2005 and second in 2006 (while winning the NCAA West Regional title). The USC women's track team captured the Mountain Pacific Sports Federation Indoor Track & Field title in 2014.

Sherry Calvert was a former head coach. Calvert, a 4-time All-American javelin thrower at USC who participated in the 1972 and 1976 Olympics, started the program as an undergraduate and coached through 1983. Fred LaPlante succeeded her from 1984 through 1988. Barbara Edmonson was coach in 1992 through 1994. In 1995, Ron Allice took over as the combined men's and women's coach.

Troy has had many other successful track and field athletes. Patty Van Wolvelaere won a pair of national titles in the 100-meter hurdles. Kerry Bell was an All-American heptathlete for 3 years. 1988 NCAA heptathlon champion Wendy Brown and Yvette Bates set world bests in the triple jump during their USC careers. Ashley Selman won the 1990 NCAA javelin title. Angela Williams became the first athlete, male or female, at any level to win 4 consecutive NCAA 100-meter dashes when she did so in 1999, 2000, 2001 and 2002. Natasha Danvers won the 2000 NCAA 400-meter intermediate hurdles. The Women of Troy won the NCAA 1600-meter relay in 1987 and the 400-meter relay in 2000. Brigita Langerholc took the 800 meters and Inga Stasiulionyte captured the javelin, both in the 2001 NCAAs. Natasha Mayers won the NCAA 200 meters in 2002. Virginia Powell won the 2005 and 2006 NCAA indoor and outdoor high hurdles (she also set the collegiate record in the outdoor race).

The Women of Troy also compete in cross country in the fall under coach Tom Walsh.

=== Volleyball ===
==== Men's volleyball ====
The men's volleyball team has made 11 NCAA Final Four appearances since scholarships were first awarded by Troy in the sport in 1977. The Trojans have won 4 NCAA titles (1977, 1980, 1988 and 1990) and have finished second on 7 other occasions (1979, 1981, 1985, 1986, 1987, 1991, 2009).

Ernie Hix, who retired as head coach after the 1981 season, turned USC into one of the top volleyball powers in the nation. Hix's 8-year record was an impressive 146-47 (.756) with 2 national crowns.

Twenty-four Trojans have played on the U.S. National team and USC volleyballers have been named first team All-Americans 27 times. In the 1984 Olympics, Steve Timmons, Dusty Dvorak and Pat Powers all helped lead the United States to its first gold medal ever in the sport, while Timmons repeated with the 1988 U.S. squad.

Timmons, Bryan Ivie, Nick Becker and Dan Greenbaum won bronze medals with the U.S. in 1992. Tim Hovland, Celso Kalache, Adam Johnson, former coach Bob Yoder (a 3-time All-American who coached Troy to an NCAA title in 1988), Donald Suxho and Brook Billings also are key figures in USC's volleyball heritage. Jim McLaughlin took over for Yoder in 1990 and led Troy to an NCAA title in his initial year. Powers became head coach in 1997, Turhan Douglas succeeded him in 2003 and Bill Ferguson took over in 2007.

==== Women's volleyball ====
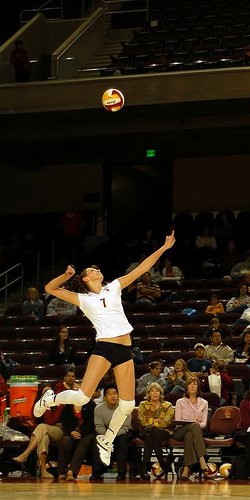
USC Women of Troy Volleyball team.

USC Volleyball has won 6 national championships, 3 in NCAA (1981, 2002, 2003) and 3 before the NCAA sponsored women's Volleyball Championships the first 4 under coach Chuck Erbe. Erbe, who dominated the sport during his 12-year USC coaching tenure which began in 1976, posted a career record of 310-121-3 (.718). He coached the 1976, 1977 and 1980 AIAW champions and the 1981 NCAA titlists. His 1976 team registered the first perfect season (38–0) in women's volleyball history.

Lisa Love, who coached at Texas-Arlington for 7 years, took over for Erbe in 1989 and guided USC into the NCAAs in 9 of her 10 seasons before retiring after the 1998 season. Jerritt Elliott served as interim head coach in 1999 and 2000, guiding the 2000 club to the NCAA Final Four. Mick Haley, head coach of the 2000 U.S. women's Olympic team who won 2 national crowns in the 1980s while at Texas, took over in 2001 and advanced to that season's NCAA regional final. Then, in 2002 and 2003, his teams won the NCAA crown, with the 2003 club going 35–0. USC also made the NCAA Final Four in 2004, 2007, and 2010.

In 1978, Debbie Green-Vargas won the Honda Sports Award for volleyball. Trojans have been named All-American 55 times and 13 have been members of the U.S. Olympic team (including Green, Sue Woodstra, Paula Weishoff, Carolyn Becker, Kim Ruddins, and Nicole Davis). 2008 graduate Asia Kaczor played for the Poland indoor national team at the 2008 Olympics, while 2006 alum Bibiana Candelas represented her native country, Mexico in beach volleyball.

=== Water polo ===
==== Men's water polo ====
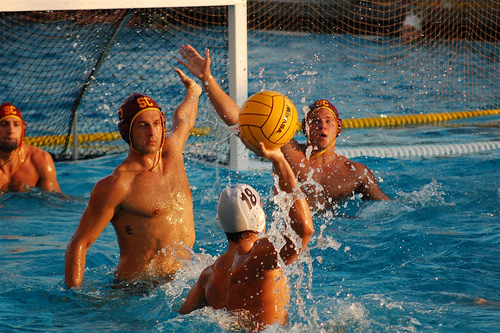
USC Trojans Men's Water Polo

Since starting water polo in 1922, the Trojans have compiled a 1191-511-8 (.699) record, winning 15 conference championships along the way.

Longtime coach John Williams led the Trojans to national prominence during his tenure from 1973 to 1998. Nineteen of his last 22 teams finished the season in the top 7 nationally, including the 1998 NCAA championship team and the 1987, 1993, 1994, 1996 and 1997 squads which placed second in the NCAA tourney.

Jovan Vavic joined as co-head coach in 1995 and took over as head coach in 1999. His 2003, 2005, 2008, 2009, 2010, 2011, 2012, 2013, and 2018 teams won the NCAA championship. With their 2011 victory, the Trojans became the first men's water polo team to win four consecutive championships. Subsequently, the 2012 team became the first to win five in a row, culminating its perfect season by defeating ucla in the NCAA final, held in its home pool, the McDonald' Swim Stadium. The 2008 team also had a perfect 29–0 season. The 2013 team also won the NCAA tournament, becoming the first collegiate water polo team, men's or women's, to win 6 NCAA championships in a row.

Seventeen USC poloists have participated in the Olympics and Trojans have made various All-American teams 140 times. Some of the more prominent names in USC water polo history are Ron Severa, Wally Wolf, Charles Bittick, Greg Fink, Greg Fults, Zach Stimson, Craig Furniss, Charles Harris, Robert Lynn, Drew Netherton, Hrvoje Cizmic, Marko Zagar, Simun Cimerman, Marko Pintaric, George Csaszar, Pedraj Damjanov, Bozidar Damjanovic and Juraj Zatovic (who in 2005 was USC's first-ever male winner of the Peter J. Cutino Award as the National Player of the Year). Since that time USC Has had 4 other Cutino Award winners in J.W. Krumpholz, Joel Dennerley, Kostas Genidounias, and Baron McQuin.

Coach Jovan Vavic was arrested and indicted in March 2019 in the 2019 college admissions bribery scandal. He was accused of signing two "recruits" who had never actually played competitive water polo, to help the students gain admission to USC, in exchange for $250,000 in bribes from the students' parents. He was charged with conspiracy to commit racketeering. The charge carries penalties of a prison term of up to 20 years, and up to $250,000 in fines. Vavic was fired by USC in the immediate wake of his indictment.

==== Women's water polo ====
USC's women's water polo team began play in 1995 under head coach Jovan Vavic. In 1999, in their fifth year of existence, the Women of Troy—led by National Player of the Year and 2000 U.S. Olympic goalie Bernice Orwig—won the national championship in an exciting 5-overtime sudden-death victory over Stanford. USC then was second in the national tourney in 2000. Then in 2004, USC—behind National Player of the Year Moriah van Norman—turned in the sport's first undefeated season (29–0) in winning the NCAA title. USC was third in the 2005 NCAAs, and second in 2006, 2008, and 2009 (losing to UCLA, 5–4).

Besides Orwig and Van Norman, other top players have included Anikó Pelle (the 2000 National Player of the Year), Nina Wengst, Olympian Sofia Konukh, Katrin Dierolf, Kelly Graff, Lauren Wenger (the 2006 National Player of the Year) and Brittany Hayes.

Current Women of Troy Hayes, Erika Figge, Patty Cardenas, and Kami Craig, along with Van Norman and Wenger, are all on the U.S. National Team, while alumnae Anna Pardo and Eszter Gyori play for Spain and Czech Republic, respectively.

On May 16, 2010, the Women of Troy became the 2010 NCAA National Champions after a 10–9 defeat of No. 1 Stanford at the Aztec Aquaplex on the campus of San Diego State University. This was the school's third women's water polo national title. On May 12, 2013, the team won its fourth national championship (third NCAA), beating Stanford, 10–9, with Anni Espar scoring the winning goal in the third sudden-death overtime period. On May 15, 2016, the Women of Troy completed their second undefeated season, winning 8–7 over Stanford in the NCAA championship game, with Stephania Haralabidis scoring from near mid-pool with only six seconds left.

Coach Jovan Vavic was arrested and indicted in March 2019 in the 2019 college admissions bribery scandal, and was fired by USC in the immediate wake of his indictment (see above section).

== Notable non-varsity teams ==
=== Men's rugby ===
Founded in 1886, USC Trojan Rugby Football Club plays Division 1-A college rugby in the PAC Rugby Conference against its PAC-12 rivals, under head coach Loa Milford. USC rugby is the oldest sport at USC, and the only USC club team that awards varsity letters to its players.

== Championships ==
=== NCAA team championships ===
USC has won 116 NCAA team national championships.

- Men's (87)
  - Baseball (12): 1948, 1958, 1961, 1963, 1968, 1970, 1971, 1972, 1973, 1974, 1978, 1998
  - Gymnastics (1): 1962
  - Indoor Track & Field (3): 1967, 1972, 2025
  - Outdoor Track & Field (27): 1926 (unofficial), 1930, 1931, 1935, 1936, 1937, 1938, 1939, 1940, 1941, 1942, 1943, 1949, 1950, 1951, 1952, 1953, 1954, 1955, 1958, 1961, 1963, 1965, 1967, 1968, 1976, 2025
  - Swimming (9): 1960, 1963, 1964, 1965, 1966, 1974, 1975, 1976, 1977
  - Tennis (21): 1946, 1951, 1955, 1958, 1962, 1963, 1964, 1966, 1967, 1968, 1969, 1976, 1991, 1993, 1994, 2002, 2009, 2010, 2011, 2012, 2014
  - Volleyball (4): 1977, 1980, 1988, 1990
  - Water Polo (10): 1998, 2003, 2005, 2008, 2009, 2010, 2011, 2012, 2013, 2018
- Women's (28)
  - Basketball (2): 1983, 1984
  - Beach Volleyball (6): 2016, 2017, 2021, 2022, 2023, 2024
  - Golf (3): 2003, 2008, 2013
  - Outdoor Track & Field (3): 2001, 2018, 2021
  - Soccer (2): 2007, 2016
  - Swimming (1): 1997
  - Tennis (2): 1983, 1985
  - Volleyball (3): 1981, 2002, 2003
  - Water Polo (7): 2004, 2010, 2013, 2016, 2018, 2021, 2026
- See also:
  - Pac-12 Conference NCAA championships
  - List of NCAA schools with the most NCAA Division I championships

=== Other national team championships ===
Below are the 24 national team titles that were not bestowed by the NCAA:

- Men's (13):
  - Football (11): 1928, 1931, 1932, 1939,^{†} 1962, 1967, 1972, 1974, 1978, 2003, 2004
  - Volleyball (2): 1949, 1950
- Women's (11):
  - Beach Volleyball (2): 2009, 2015
  - Tennis (5): 1977 (2)^{‡}, 1978^{‡}, 1979, 1980
  - Volleyball (3): 1976, 1977, 1980
  - Water Polo (1): 1999

† 1939 title is not recognized by College Football Data Warehouse
‡ USC won AIAW national tennis championships in 1977, 1979 and 1980. USC won USLTA team titles in 1977 and 1978.

- See also:
  - List of NCAA schools with the most Division I national championships

== Trophies ==
=== Victory Bell ===
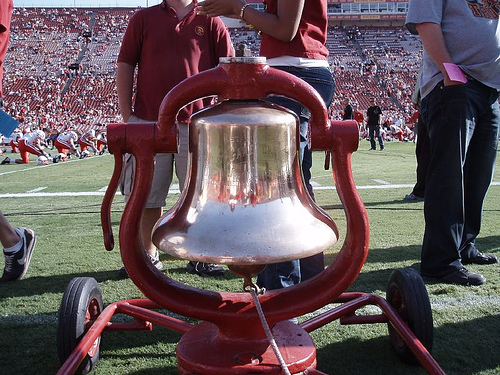
USC's possession of the Victory Bell.

The Victory Bell is the rivalry trophy in the UCLA–USC crosstown rivalry. The winner of the annual football contest keeps the bell for the next year, and paints it the school's color: cardinal red for USC, True Blue for UCLA.

The 295-pound bell was taken from the top of a Southern Pacific locomotive. The bell was given to the UCLA student body in 1939 as a gift from the school's alumni association. Initially, the UCLA cheerleaders rang the bell after each Bruin point. However, during the opening game of UCLA's 1941 season (at the time, both schools used the LA Coliseum for home games), six members of USC's Sigma Phi Epsilon fraternity (who were also members of the Trojan Knights) infiltrated the Bruin rooting section, assisted in loading the bell aboard a truck headed back to Westwood, took the key to the truck, and escaped with the bell while UCLA's actual rooters went to find a replacement key. The bell remained hidden from UCLA students for more than a year, first in the Sigma Phi Epsilon house's basement, then in the Hollywood Hills, Santa Ana and other locations. At one point, it was even concealed beneath a haystack. Bruin students tried to locate the bell, but to no avail. Tension between UCLA and USC students rose as each started to play even more elaborate and disruptive pranks on the other. When the conflict caused the USC President to threaten to cancel the rivalry, a compromise was met: on November 12, 1942, the student body presidents of both schools, in front of Tommy Trojan, signed the agreement that before home games, when the bell is in USC's possession, it sits along Trousdale Parkway for fans to ring as they participate in the "Trojan Walk" to the L.A. Coliseum. During home games, and whenever USC faces UCLA at the Rose Bowl, the Victory Bell is displayed at the edge of the field for the first three quarters of the game. Members of the Trojan Knights emphatically ring the bell every time the Trojans score.

USC has an overall record of 46-28-7 in the crosstown rivalry.

=== The Jeweled Shillelagh ===
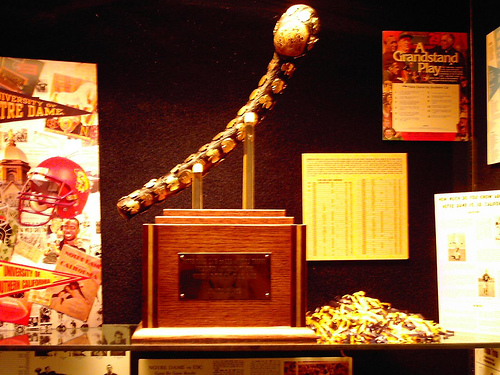
The First Jeweled Shillelagh.

The shillelagh, a Gaelic war club made of oak or blackthorn saplings from Ireland, is the rivalry trophy for USC-Notre Dame football games. Like the Victory Bell, the winner of the annual game gets to keep possession of The Shillelagh until the following year. For every USC victory, a ruby-adorned Trojan head with the year and game score is added; for every Notre Dame win, an emerald-studded shamrock with similar year and score information is added. The club was presented as a rivalry trophy in 1952 by the Notre Dame Alumni Club of Los Angeles (with all the previous games already represented with medallions), and is engraved with "From the Emerald Isle."

There have been two shillelaghs. The original ran out of room in 1989 and was retired; it is now on permanent display at Notre Dame. The second shillelaghs is slightly longer and contains medallions from the 1990 game onwards.

There are now 45 shamrocks, 36 Trojan heads and 5 combined medallions on the shillelaghs.

=== Gauntlet Trophy ===
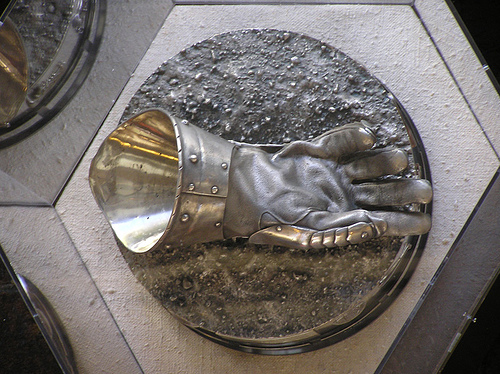
USC UCLA Lexus Gauntlet.

Since 2001, USC athletics have participated in a direct competition with cross-town rival UCLA called the SoCal BMW Crosstown Cup. Originally known as the Lexus Gauntlet, the corporate naming rights shifted to BMW after Lexus did not continue sponsorship of the competition after its contract expired in 2009, however, the two schools do continue to keep track of the competition scores.

A victory in NCAA-sanctioned sports competition between the schools earns the winning school a predetermined number of points towards a final count. (For example, a single football victory is worth 10 points whereas all head-to-head men's water polo victories count as a series and the series is worth 5 points, with 2.5 points awarded to each university in the case of a split.) USC won the trophy's inaugural 2001–02 season, and again in 2003–04 and 2005–06, and then seven straight years from 2007–08 to most recently 2013–14.

== Athletic facilities ==
=== Los Angeles Memorial Coliseum ===
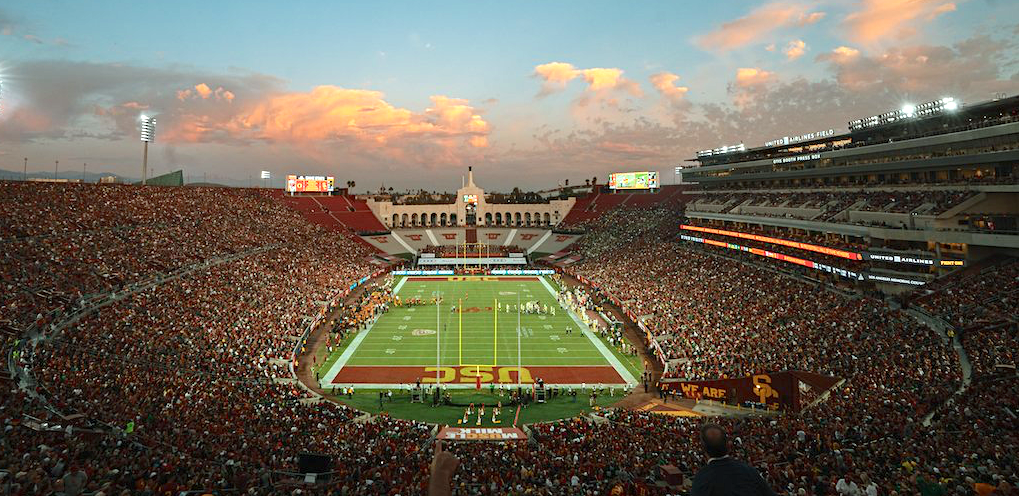
The Los Angeles Memorial Coliseum during a USC game in 2019.

The Los Angeles Memorial Coliseum is one of the largest stadiums in America. USC has played football in the Coliseum ever since the grand stadium was built in 1923. In fact, the Trojans played in the first varsity football game ever held there (beating Pomona College, 23–7, on October 6, 1923). The Coliseum was the site of the 1932 Summer Olympics and hosted the opening and closing ceremonies and track events of the 1984 Olympic Games. Over the years, the Coliseum has been home to many sports teams besides the Trojans, including UCLA football, Los Angeles Chargers, Los Angeles Rams, Los Angeles Raiders football, and Los Angeles Dodgers baseball. The Coliseum, which is managed and operated by USC, has hosted various other events, from concerts and speeches to track meets and motorcycle races.

The Coliseum is located on 17 acres (6.9 ha) in Exposition Park, which also houses museums, gardens and BMO Stadium, the home of Los Angeles FC. The Coliseum is jointly owned by the State of California, Los Angeles County, and the City of Los Angeles. In July 2013 under a new 98-year master lease agreement USC assumed sole financial responsibility for the day-to-day management, operation, and maintenance of both the Coliseum and the Los Angeles Memorial Sports Arena which was later demolished.

The Coliseum has a present full-capacity of 77,500 seats after USC completed a major $315 million renovation of the stadium in 2019 that added a new seven-story Tower on the stadium's south side housing luxury suites, loge boxes, club seats, a new concourse with concession stands, a new press box, and rooftop club lounge.

=== John McKay Center at USC ===
Opened in 2012, the John McKay Center at USC is a $70 million, 110,000-square-foot athletic and academic center named after football coach John McKay and is home to the USC Trojan Football Department. The building houses meeting rooms, coaches' offices and a locker room for the football program, as well as the Stevens Academic Center (including space for tutoring, counseling, study and computer rooms for student-athletes), a weight room, an athletic training room and a state-of-the-art digital media production facility for all of USC's 21 sports.

The centerpiece of the McKay Center is the two-story video board in the Parker Hughes atrium, which can display six big-screen televisions at once as well as promotional videos and graphics. The building has a 60,000-square-foot basement that includes weight room, athletic training room, locker rooms and players' lounge, a 25,000-square-foot ground floor with Student-Athlete Academic Services center, reception area and outdoor courtyard, and a 25,000-square-foot second floor with football coaches' offices, football team meeting rooms, outdoor patio and a state-of-the-art video production facility. The John McKay Center is adjacent to Heritage Hall, the Galen Dining Center, Brittingham Field, and the Howard Jones Field/Brian Kennedy Field practice facility.

=== Howard Jones Field/Brian Kennedy Field ===
Howard Jones Field/Brian Kennedy Field are the practice fields for the USC Trojans football team located across from the John McKay Center at USC.

=== Cromwell Field and Loker Stadium ===
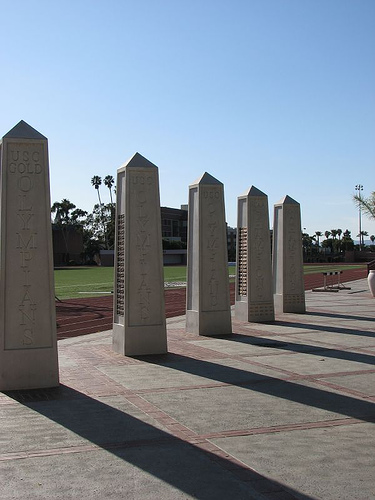
National and Olympic Champion Monuments inside Cromwell Field and Loker Stadium

The 3,000-seat Katherine B. Loker Stadium houses Cromwell Track and Field and is named Cromwell Field and Loker Stadium. It opened in 2001 and was dedicated on May 5 of that year during the USC-UCLA dual meet which USC won handily. The facility includes the track offices, locker rooms, an athlete lounge, family lounges, media facilities, state-of-the-art medical treatment capabilities, and general-purpose meeting rooms. The track and field portion of the venue is still named after USC coach Dean Cromwell, winner of 12 NCAA titles.

The entrance to the facility is called "Louis Zamperini Plaza" and includes tributes to USC's NCAA and Olympic champions.

Cromwell Track & Field was used as a training and warm-up facility during the 1984 Olympic Games in Los Angeles. It underwent a complete refurbishing in fall 1983. Not only was the track resurfaced, but the high jump area was expanded, two new sand pits for the horizontal jumps were installed and a new drainage system was also added.

The stadium hosted the 2003 Pac-10 Championships, the first conference meet hosted by USC since 1986.

=== David X. Marks Tennis Stadium ===
The David X. Marks Tennis Stadium on the USC campus is one of the most modern collegiate tennis facilities in the country.

A new and much-anticipated addition was recently made to the tennis stadium. In May 2004, USC installed a new $300,000 LED Daktronic interactive scoreboard so fans can now follow each match point-for-point from their seat. The new scoreboard will also enables fans at home to log on and follow the match live over the internet.

The stadium also underwent renovations in the summer of 2002. Seven hundred chair-back seats were added to replace the bleachers on the baselines and all five courts were repainted and lined.

The 1,000-seat stadium features five oversized hard courts. Two of the courts are named after famous USC alumni and Wimbledon singles champions, Alex Olmedo and Stan Smith. The center court is named for USC's 13 Grand Slam doubles champions Byron Black, Bob Falkenburg, Luke Jensen, Murphy Jensen, Rick Leach, Bob Lutz, Gene Mako, Olmedo, Rafael Osuna, Dennis Ralston, Raul Ramirez, Ted Schroeder and Smith.

Underneath the stadium is the Leonard Andrews Varsity Lounge and Team Room, along with two locker rooms. The locker rooms were recently renovated through a gift made by John and Michelle Katnik of Diversified Development. Each locker room features the program's recent conference championship trophies, Hall of Fame walls with past NCAA singles and doubles champions, as well as the men's and women's national championship trophies.

At the entrance to the stadium is a list of all 16 of the USC men's national champion years and seven women's tennis national championships, including a newly added 2002 for last year's men's tennis title squad.

The stadium was dedicated in 1973 when former Trojan stars Alex Olmedo, Stan Smith, Dennis Ralston and Bob Lutz held a tennis exhibition. The 1974 men's NCAA Tournament was held at Marks Stadium (USC finished second).

=== Dedeaux Field ===
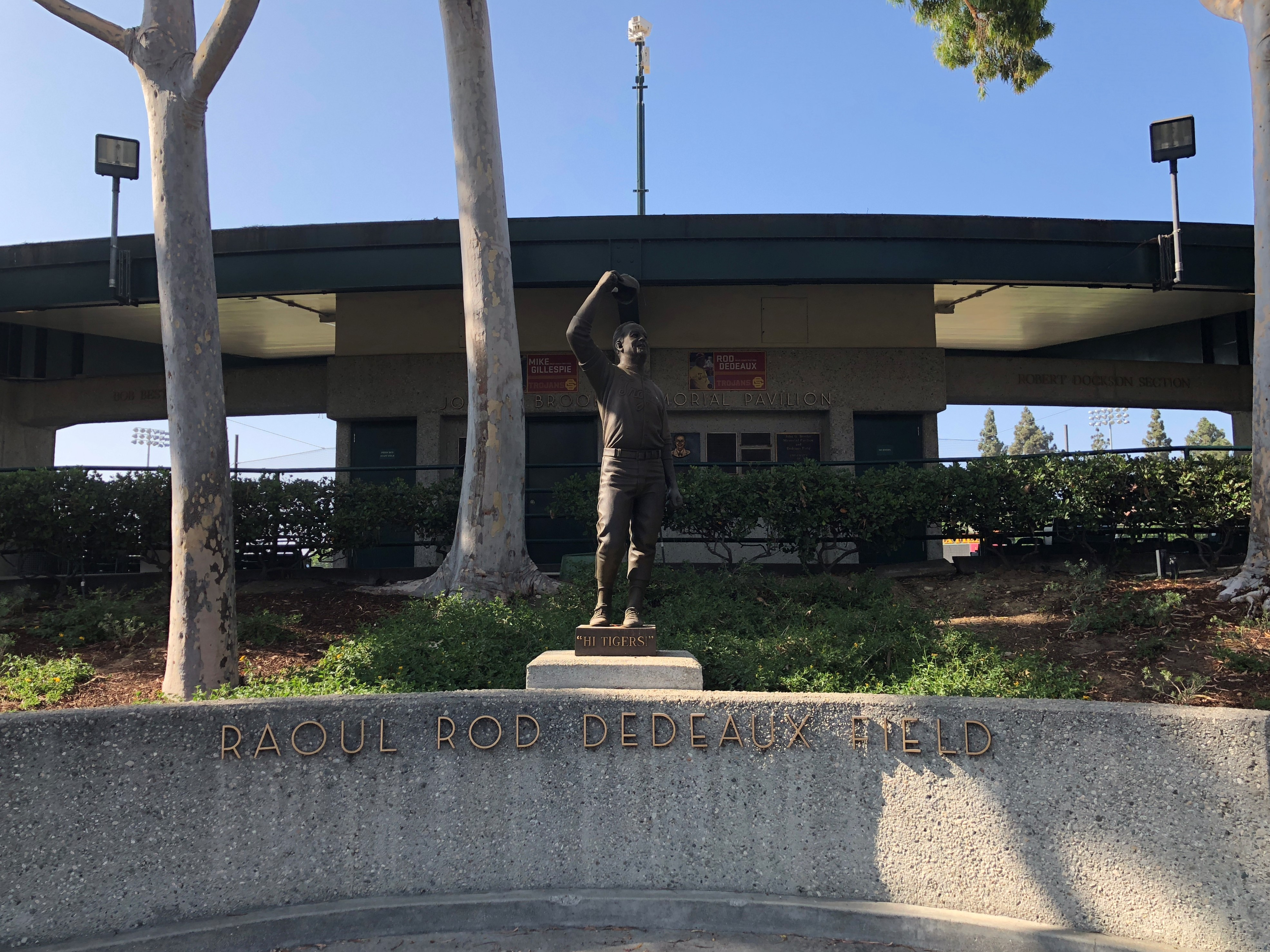
Dedeaux Field

Opened on March 30, 1974, Dedeaux Field, named after head baseball coach Rod Dedeaux, has continually been improved over the years with the grandest project taking place before the 2002 season. A $4 million project signified the largest improvement made to the facility as a new clubhouse and players' lounge were added on the first base side. Expanded offices for the coaching staff and new Hall of Fame were also part of the project, along with a new pavilion. Prior Plaza, named after Jerry and Millie Prior (parents of former Trojan Mark Prior), is located on the first base side and features USC's All-Americans and players who have played in the majors.

A new bleacher section was added on the first base side, pushing capacity to 2,500 at Dedeaux Field. With dimensions of 335 feet (102 m) down the right and left field lines, 365 in the right field power alleys and 375 to the left field power alleys, and 395 to straightaway center, Dedeaux Field is a natural grass field. The outfield fences stand 10 feet (3.0 m) high.

=== Galen Center ===
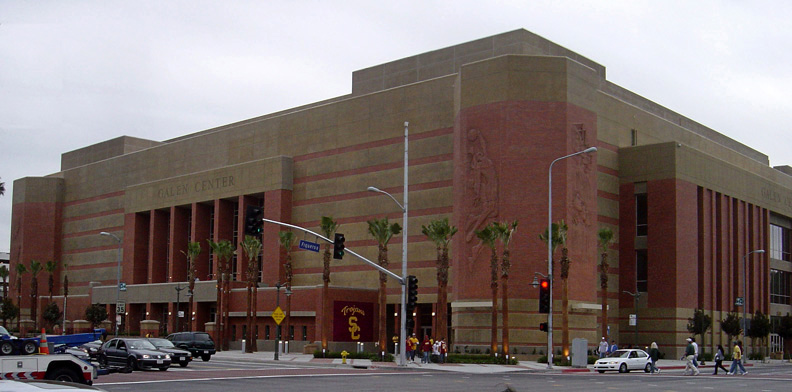
The Galen Center

Opened in September 2006, the Galen Center is the basketball and volleyball facility for the University of Southern California Trojans. Located at the southeast corner of Jefferson Boulevard and Figueroa Street in the Exposition Park area of Los Angeles, it is across the street from the campus and near the Shrine Auditorium.

The facility, named after Louis Galen, is 255,000 square feet (23,700 m^{2}), with a 45,000 square feet (4,200 m^{2}) pavilion, and has three practice courts and offices. The seating capacity is 10,258 as well as 22 private suites.

=== Johnson Family Golf Practice Facility ===
The Burell C. Johnson Family practice facility is the practice facility for the men's and women's golf teams at USC. Dedicated on November 25, 2000, it is night-lighted and provides the Trojan golf teams with an opportunity to practice their short game with a focus on chipping, putting and bunker play. It is located behind Dedeaux Field on the USC campus.

=== Lyon Center ===
The 1,500-seat Lyon Center main gym hosts some USC Trojan intercollegiate events. The Lyon Center is the on-campus student recreation center.

=== McAlister Field ===
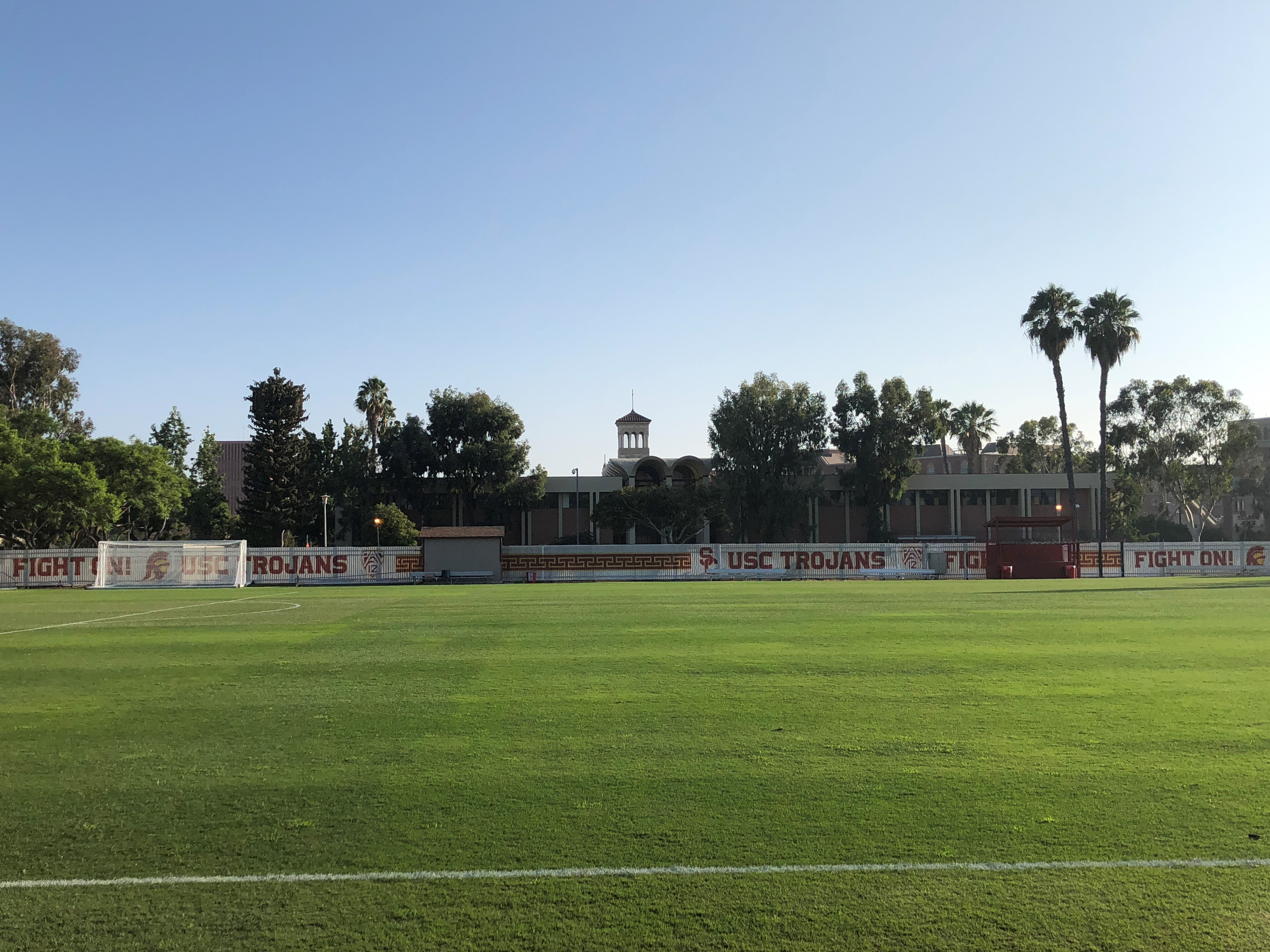
McAlister Field

McAlister Field is a 1,000-seat facility opened in 1998. It is home to the women's soccer team and women's lacrosse team. It is also home to the USC men's and women's club rugby teams.

=== Merle Norman Stadium ===
Merle Norman Stadium was dedicated on March 7, 2013. It is the home of the women's beach volleyball team.

=== USC Boathouse ===
The USC Boathouse is the off-campus boathouse for the USC crew team. It is located at the Los Angeles Harbor.

=== USC Physical education building ===
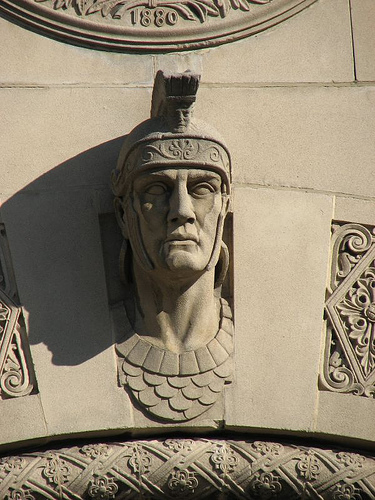
Trojan atop the physical education building

The USC Physical Education building houses the 1,000-seat North Gym and also campus' first indoor swimming facilities. Until 2006, the men's volleyball and women's volleyball teams used the facility as their home venue. The venue is still used for select volleyball matches.

The Trojans basketball and volleyball teams also practiced in the North Gym until 2006.

=== Uytengsu Aquatics Center ===
The Uytengsu Aquatics Center (originally the McDonald's Olympic Swim Stadium) is an outdoor aquatics venue located on the campus of the University of Southern California in Los Angeles, US. The facility features two pools: a long course pool (50x25 meters), and a diving well (25x25 yards), with towers. The facility is the home pool for the USC Trojans swimming and diving teams.

The facility was originally constructed for the 1984 Summer Olympics, and opened in July 1983. Financial assistance for the construction of the facility came from McDonald's, and for the first 29 years of its existence, the stadium bore the name McDonald's Olympic Swim Stadium.

At the time of the '84 Games, it was called the "Olympic Swim Stadium", and was the main Aquatics venue at the Games, hosting competitions in Swimming, Diving, and Synchronized Swimming. (Note: Water Polo was held at Raleigh Runnels Memorial Pool in Malibu, California.) For the Games, the facility featured temporary bleacher seating around the two pools, which were removed after the Games. In 1989, the Lyon Center was built on a portion of the land where the Games stands were.

The pool has hosted several high-level national meets since 1984, including the 1989 U.S. Swimming Nationals, the Swimming competitions at the 1991 U.S. Olympic Festival, and the 1993 U.S. Diving Nationals. It hosted the NCAA Women's Water Polo Championship in 2002 and is slated to host again in 2014. It also hosted the NCAA Men's Water Polo Championship in 2012.

The pool was closed in 2013, was rebuilt, and reopened in 2014 with its current name, an homage to USC alumnus Fred Uytengsu, who donated $8 million for the renovations. The pool is named for former USC swim coach Peter Daland, while the diving tower was dedicated to Olympian diver Sammy Lee.

== Athletic directors ==
- Willis O. Hunter (1925–1957)
- Jess Hill (1957–1972)
- John McKay (1972–1975)
- Dick Perry (1975–1984)
- Mike McGee (1984–1993)
- Mike Garrett (1993–2010)
- Pat Haden (2010–2016)
- Lynn Swann (2016–2019)
- Dave Roberts (interim, 2019)
- Mike Bohn (2019–2023)
- Jennifer Cohen (2023–present)

== Trojan fight songs ==
=== Fight On ===
The school's fight song, Fight On is usually played after first downs and touchdowns. The music for USC's fight song, Fight On, was composed in 1922 by USC dental student Milo Sweet (with lyrics by Sweet and Glen Grant) as an entry in a Trojan spirit contest. Outside of USC, the song has been used in numerous recordings and movies. The song was also adapted by an American task force in the Pacific theater of World War II.

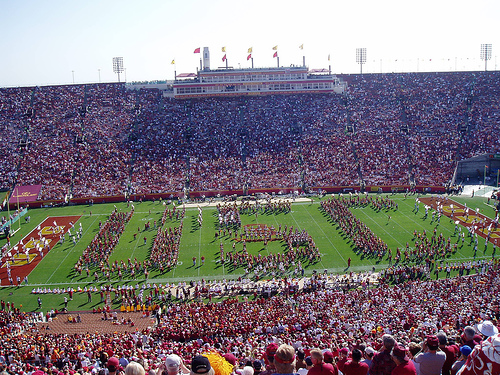
USC Band before a game in 2006.

=== All Hail ===
The words and music to USC's alma mater, All Hail, were composed in the early 1920s by Al Wesson, Troy's longtime sports information director. He wrote the song as a student member of the Trojan Marching Band for the finale of a 1923 campus show.

=== Conquest ===
Another famous USC song is the processional march, Conquest, by Alfred Newman. It is usually played after every USC victory, and in the case of football, after every score. The battle cry, from Newman's score to the 1947 motion picture Captain from Castile, has become synonymous with the tradition of USC since the Trojans adopted it in 1954 during a basketball game against Oregon State. Newman, a composer of film music, was the musical director of Twentieth Century-Fox Studios dedicated this as a perpetual gift to USC.

=== Other songs ===
Tribute To Troy, the incessant stanza of pounding drums and blaring horns, is played after every defensive stop. Fanfare is the introduction to Tribute To Troy and is played when the band takes the field. All Right Now is played after USC recovers a turnover. Another One Bites the Dust is played after USC gets a sack. The William Tell Overture is played at the start of the fourth quarter. Imperial March (Darth Vader's theme from the Star Wars films) is played when USC is flagged for a major penalty. Tusk (by Fleetwood Mac) is also played during the 4th quarter with the fans chanting "U-C-L-A Sucks!" The band plays "Levels" by Avicii whenever the opposing team is flagged for a major penalty.

== Trojans in the Olympics ==
- From the 1904 Summer Olympics through the 2014 winter games, 422 Trojan athletes have competed in the Games, taking home 135 gold medals, 88 silver and 65 bronze.
- At least one USC Trojan has won a gold medal at every Summer Olympics from 1912 all the way through 2024.
- There have been more Trojans in the Olympics than from any other university in the world – if USC were its own nation in the Olympics, it would rank tied for 8th in the world in total gold medals earned, but only after counting each USC gold-medal winner individually and each country's team medals as a single medal. For instance, USC's three women's water polo 2012 gold medalists count as 3 medals by this method, whereas silver medalist Spain only counts one medal.

== See also ==
- NCAA football bowl records
- 2019 college admissions bribery scandal
