= Zada =

Zada may refer to:

- Zada (suffix), royal and last name common in Afghanistan, alternate spelling of Zadeh
- Zada (footballer) (born 1980), Leonardo Martins Dinelli, Brazilian footballer
- Zada Mary Cooper, American pharmacist
- Zada Salihović, German politician
- Nia Jax, American professional wrestler previously known as Zada

== People with the surname Zada ==
- Gabriel Zada
- Itay Zada
- Jason Zada
- Lior Zada
- Norman Zada
