= Rock Theatre =

Rock Theatre was a variety show performed at the drama department of the University of Southern California during the early 1980s, which integrated the genres of rock and musical theatre. After his graduation from USC, Rock Theatre director Greg Holford adapted the concept to his new position with a youth performing arts ensemble called Kids of the Century (formerly City of Los Angeles Children's Chorus), in partnership with Musical Director Terry Danne.

The new, younger, Rock Theatre was hired for performances at many community and industrial events, and participated in vocal/dance competitions throughout the 1980s and 1990s. In 1992, Rock Theatre became a California non-profit educational corporation, with the stated goal of providing excellent opportunities for performing arts education to the youth of Southern California. It was also in 1992 that the group was chosen to represent the United States at the World's Fair in Seville, Spain.

Among the alumni of Rock Theatre in its various incarnations are actors Ally Sheedy and Eric Stoltz, Dana Daurey (of the TV series Providence), Carmit Bachar (Pussycat Dolls), and Broadway headliner Mandy Gonzalez (In The Heights, Dance of the Vampires (musical), Aida (musical)). While some alumni have gone on to perform on Broadway, TV, record albums, others have followed other career goals and passions.

Rock Theatre comprises two competition choirs in the movie Sister Act 2 and is featured on John Tesh's album The Choirs of Christmas. Other performance highlights include "Joseph and the Amazing Technicolor Dreamcoat" at the Pantages Theatre starring Sam Harris. In 2000, a new generation of Rock Theatre was selected to perform before an international audience with a performance tour of Australia. Performances included at the World Music Festival, Olympic Torch Relay, and at the Sydney Opera House.
