= Gabriel Zada =

American neurosurgeon

- Born: December 14, 1978 (age 47)
- Citizenship: United States
- Education: Bachelor's degree in molecular and cell biology from University of California Berkeley in 2000; Medical degree from University of California San Francisco in 2004; Fellowships from Harvard Medical School (Brigham and Women's Hospital) and Università Degli Studi di Napoli Federico II; Master's Degree in Clinical and Biomedical Investigation from the University of Southern California in 2015
- Occupations: Neurosurgeon; professor; Author; Scientist
- Employers: University of Southern California; Zilkha Neurogenetic Institute
- Known for: brain tumor and pituitary tumor surgery, minimally invasive cranial surgery
- Awards: Fellowship of the American College of Surgeons

Gabriel Zada (born December 14, 1978) is Professor of Neurological Surgery at the University of Southern California. He is known for his work in brain tumor and pituitary tumor surgery. He is the director of the USC Brain Tumor Center, USC Endoscopic Skull Base Surgery Program and USC Radiosurgery Center. He is also an NIH-funded principal investigator at the Zilkha Neurogenetic Institute. He has published over 200 peer-reviewed articles on various neurosurgical topics.

== Early life and education ==
Zada graduated from Van Nuys High School in 1996. He earned a bachelor’s degree from the University of California, Berkeley, an MD from the University of California, San Francisco, in 2004, and completed postgraduate training and fellowships at LAC+USC Medical Center, Brigham and Women’s Hospital, and the University of Naples Federico II. In 2015, he earned a master’s degree from the University of Southern California and became board certified in neurological surgery.

== Career ==
Zada joined the Keck School of Medicine of USC as an assistant professor in 2011. As of 2021, he is a professor of neurosurgery, Otolaryngology, and Internal Medicine at USC. He is a faculty member at the Zilkha Neurogenetic Institute of USC and Associate Residency Program Director at USC Neurosurgery Residency Program.

Zada is a Fellow of the American College of Surgeons.

== Books ==
- Zada, Gabriel; Jensen, Randy L. (2016). Meningiomas. Philadelphia, Pennsylvania. ISBN 978-0323443890.
- Atlas of Sellar and Parasellar Lesions: Clinical, Radiologic, and Pathologic Correlations. Philadelphia, Pennsylvania: SPRINGER INTERNATIONAL PU. 2016. ISBN 978-3319342719.
- Zada, Gabriel; Pradilla, Gustavo; Day, J.D. (2023). Subcortical Neurosurgery: Open and Parafascicular Channel-Based Approaches for Subcortical and Intraventricular Lesions. Philadelphia, Pennsylvania: SPRINGER INTERNATIONAL. ISBN 978-3030951559.

== Selected publications ==
- Endonasal transsphenoidal approach to treat pituitary adenomas and other sellar lesions: an assessment of efficacy, safety, and patient impressions of the surgery, published in 2003

== Awards and recognition ==
- 2009 Dandy Fellowship Award Congress of Neurological Surgeons (CNS), New Orleans, LA
- 2009 Integra Foundation Award for Brain Tumor Research, Congress of Neurological Surgeons (CNS), New Orleans, LA
- 2010 Mahaley Brain Tumor Research Award, American Association of Neurological Surgeons (AANS), Philadelphia, PA
- 2015 Byron Cone Pevehouse Research Award, American Association of Neurological Surgeons (AANS), Washington, DC
- 2017 Integra Foundation Award for Brain Tumor Research, Congress of Neurological Surgeons (CNS), Boston, MA
