= University of Southern California =

Private university in Los Angeles, California, US

- Motto: Latin: Palmam qui meruit ferat
- Motto in English: "Let whoever earns the palm bear it"
- Type: Private research university
- Established: October 6, 1880; 146 years ago
- Accreditation: WSCUC
- Religious affiliation: Nonsectarian, historically Methodist
- Academic affiliations: AAU; APRU; NAICU; UARC; Sea-grant; Space-grant
- Endowment: US$8.8 billion (2025)
- Budget: US$7.4 billion (2023–24)
- President: Beong-Soo Kim
- Provost: Andrew T. Guzman
- Faculty: 4,767 (2023)
- Administrative staff: 18,123 (2023)
- Students: 47,147 (2024)
- Undergraduates: 21,023 (2024)
- Postgraduates: 26,124 (2024)
- Location: Los Angeles, California, United States; 34.0206°N 118.2848°W
- Campus: University Park campus, 226 acres (0.91 km^{2}) Health Sciences campus, 79 acres (0.32 km^{2})
- Other campuses: Alhambra; Sacramento; Washington D.C.
- Newspaper: Daily Trojan
- Colors: Cardinal and gold
- Nickname: Trojans
- Sporting affiliations: NCAA Division I FBS – Big Ten; ACHA; MPSF
- Mascots: Traveler; Tommy Trojan (unofficial)
- Website: usc.edu

The University of Southern California (USC, SC, or Southern Cal^{[a]}) is a private research university in Los Angeles, California, United States. Founded in 1880 by Robert M. Widney, it is the oldest private research university in California and has an enrollment of more than 47,000 students.

The university is composed of a liberal arts school, the Dornsife College of Letters, Arts and Sciences, and 22 undergraduate, graduate, and professional schools, enrolling roughly 21,000 undergraduate and 28,500 post-graduate students from all fifty U.S. states and more than 115 countries. It is a member of the Association of American Universities, which it joined in 1969.

USC sponsors a variety of intercollegiate sports and competes in the National Collegiate Athletic Association (NCAA) and the Big Ten Conference. Members of USC's sports teams, the Trojans, have won 107 NCAA team championships and 412 NCAA individual championships. As of 2021, Trojan athletes have won 326 medals at the Olympic Games (153 golds, 96 silvers, and 77 bronzes), more than any other American university. USC has had 571 football players drafted to the National Football League, the second-highest number of draftees in the country.

== History ==
=== Founding and early history ===
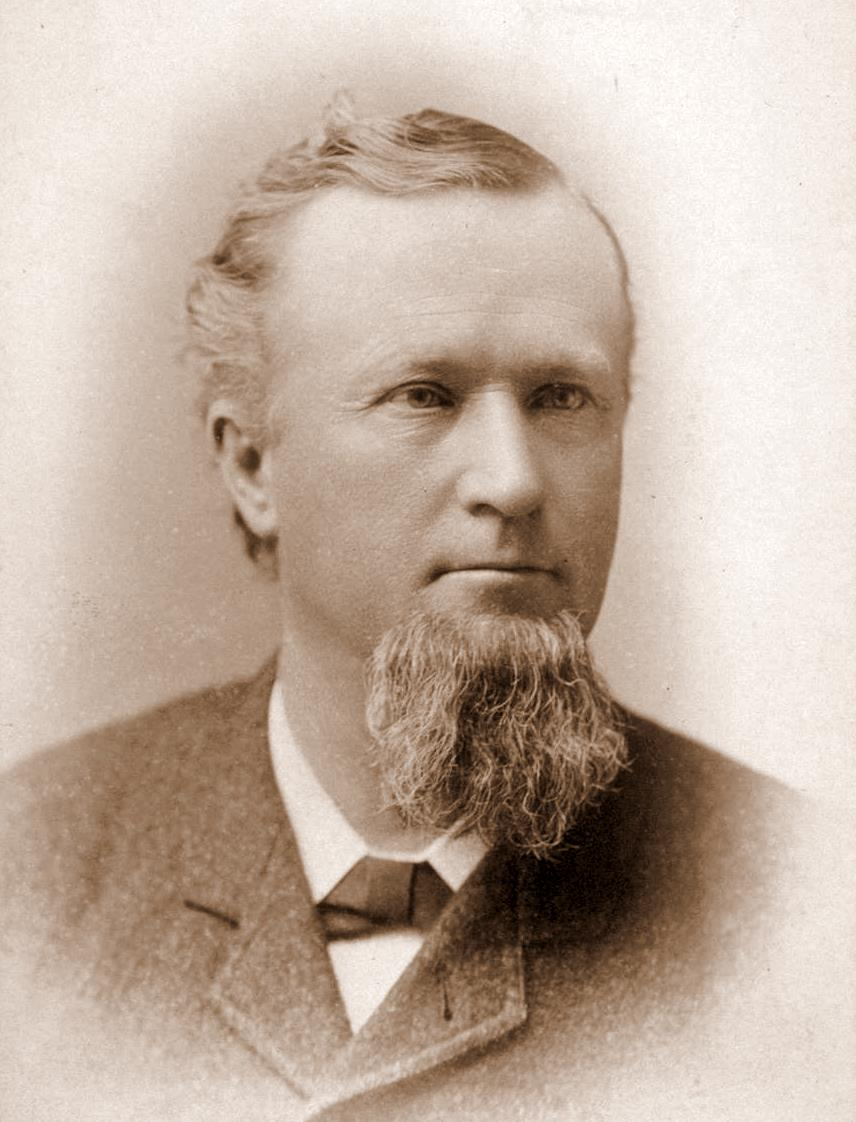
Robert Maclay Widney, founder of the university, photographed in 1885

The University of Southern California was founded following the efforts of Judge Robert Maclay Widney, who helped secure donations from several key figures in early Los Angeles history: a Protestant nurseryman, Ozro Childs; an Irish Catholic former governor, John Gately Downey; and a German Jewish banker, Isaias Wolf Hellman. The three donated 308 acres to establish the campus and provided the necessary seed money for the construction of the first buildings. Originally operated in affiliation with the Methodist Church, the school mandated from the start that "no student would be denied admission because of race". The university is no longer affiliated with any church, having severed formal ties in 1952. When USC opened in 1880, the school had an enrollment of 53 students and a faculty of 10. Its first graduating class in 1884 was a class of three: two men and one woman, who was valedictorian.

USC was further expanded with the construction of Old College in 1887, which served as the college of Liberal Arts (now Dornsife College of Letters, Arts, and Sciences). Although envisioned as the permanent centerpiece to the university, its age and lack of earthquake safety became major concerns as USC moved through the 20th century. The building was eventually demolished in 1948.

=== USC in the 20th century ===
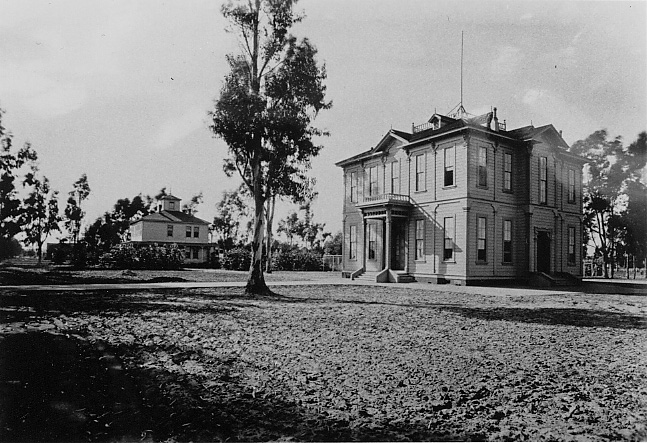
The Widney Alumni House, the campus's first building, photographed in 1903

Despite a growing student and faculty population, the university maintained most of its campus along Trousdale Parkway (then known as University Avenue). Beginning in 1919, architect John Parkinson developed a master plan for the university that expanded beyond this avenue, focusing on Romanesque buildings for which the university has become notable. Bovard Administration Building was completed in 1921 along this parkway, and remains one of the university's oldest and most iconic buildings. The Gwynn Wilson Student Union, Doheny Memorial Library, and Allan Hancock Foundation were completed in 1927, 1932, and 1940, respectively, and remain directly adjacent to the university's central quad (now Hahn Plaza). Many of these were constructed under President Rufus B. von KleinSmid, who spearheaded the creation of 19 buildings over 25 years.

The onset of World War II led to a transformation of campus life, with a shift in academic programs and student enrollment. Total enrollment fell 15%; military programs were instituted, and by the end of the war, 75% of male students were involved in some branch of the military. USC was one of 131 colleges and universities nationally that took part in the V-12 Navy College Training Program, which offered students a path to a Navy commission. After the war ended, enrollment of veterans under the G.I. Bill soared to 24,000 by 1947, straining USC's facilities and resources.

In 1950, Founder's Hall (now Taper Hall of Humanities) was constructed, becoming the first new classroom space in a decade. University Avenue was closed to through traffic. In 1958, Norman Topping became president and initiated a campaign for capital construction to support USC's burgeoning population. With the assistance of architect William Pereira, USC constructed 99 buildings between 1961 and 1979. The university hosted some Olympic activities in 1984, and in 1990, Steven Sample became president of the university.

=== Origin of USC's mascot ===
USC students and athletes are known as Trojans, epitomized by the Trojan Shrine, nicknamed "Tommy Trojan", near the center of campus. Until 1912, USC students (especially athletes) were known as Fighting Methodists or Wesleyans, though neither name was approved by the university. Tommy's sword has been stolen so frequently that instead of replacing it with an expensive brass one each time, he is now provided with a wooden one. During a fateful track and field meet with Stanford University, the USC team was beaten early and seemingly conclusively. After only the first few events, it seemed implausible USC would ever win, but the team fought back, winning many of the later events, to lose only by a slight margin. After this contest, Los Angeles Times sportswriter Owen Bird reported the USC athletes "fought on like the Trojans of antiquity", and the president of the university at the time, George F. Bovard, approved the name officially.

== Campus ==
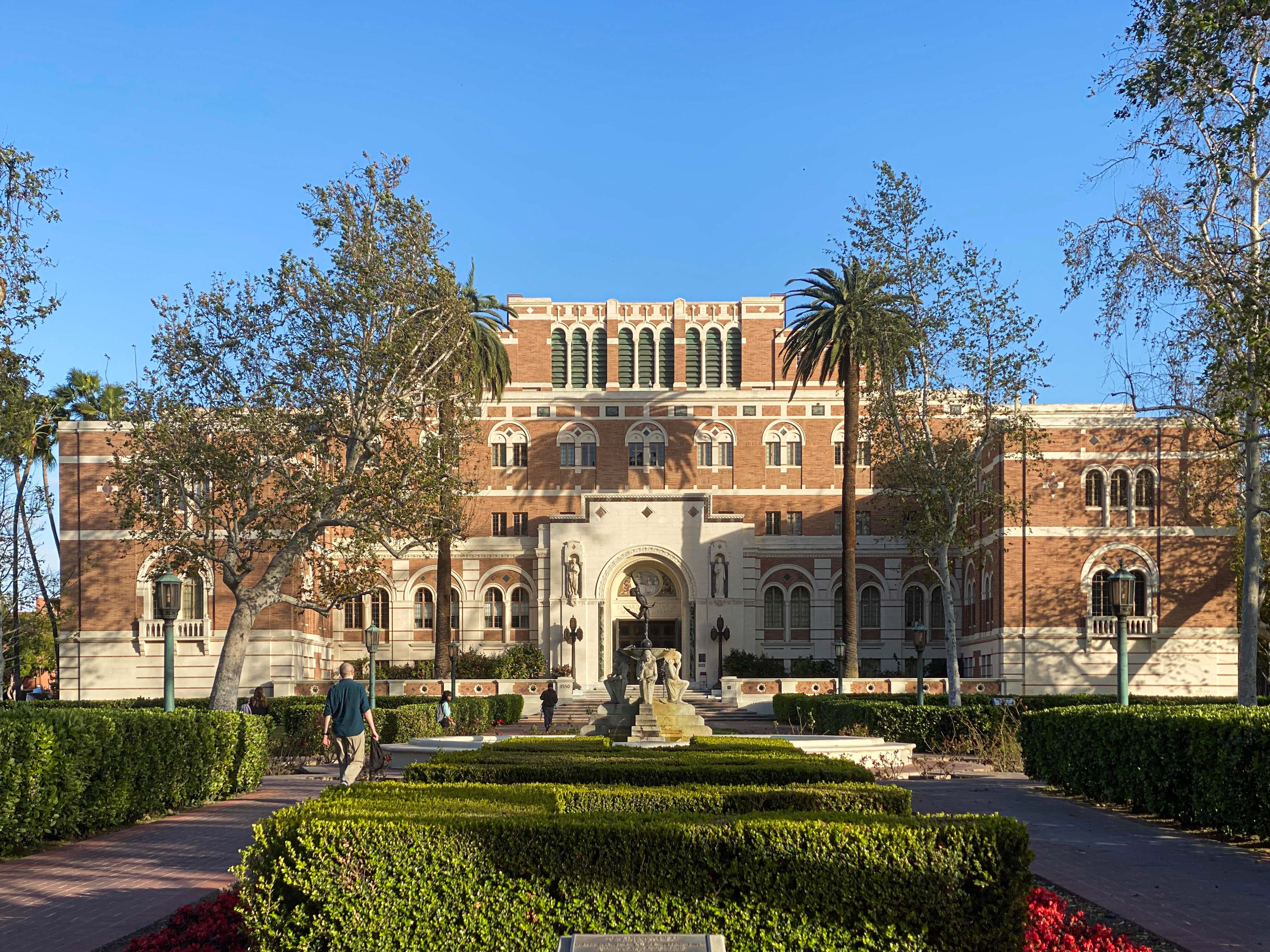
The Doheny Library

The main campus is in the University Park neighborhood of Los Angeles, 2 miles (3.2 km) southwest of downtown Los Angeles. Located off exit 20B of Interstate 110, the campus's boundaries are Jefferson Boulevard on the north and northeast, Figueroa Street on the southeast, Exposition Boulevard on the south, and Vermont Avenue on the west. Since the 1960s, through-campus vehicle traffic has been either severely restricted or entirely prohibited on some thoroughfares. The University Park campus is within walking distance of Los Angeles landmarks such as the Shrine Auditorium and Los Angeles Memorial Coliseum, which is operated and managed by the university. Most buildings are in the Romanesque Revival style, although some dormitories, engineering buildings, and physical sciences labs are of various Modernist styles (especially two large Brutalist dormitories at the campus's northern edge) that sharply contrast with the predominantly red-brick campus. Widney Alumni House, built in 1880, is the oldest university building in Southern California. The historic portion of the main campus was listed on the National Register of Historic Places in 2015.

Besides its main campus at University Park, USC also operates the Health Sciences Campus about 2 miles (3.2 km) northeast of downtown. In addition, the Children's Hospital Los Angeles is staffed by USC faculty from the Keck School of Medicine, and is often referred to as USC's third campus. USC also operates an Orange County center in Irvine for business, pharmacy, social work, and education, and the Information Sciences Institute, with centers in Arlington, Virginia, and Marina del Rey. For its science students, USC operates the Wrigley Institute for Environmental Studies on Catalina Island just 20 miles (32 km) off the coast of Los Angeles, and home to the Philip K. Wrigley Marine Science Center.

The Price School of Public Policy also runs a satellite campus in Sacramento. A Health Sciences Alhambra campus holds the Primary Care Physician Assistant Program, the Institute for Health Promotion and Disease Prevention Research (IPR), and the Master's in Public Health Program. In 2005, USC established a federal relations office in Washington, DC., and in March 2023, USC announced the opening of a new Capital Campus in Washington, D.C. The university purchased a seven-story, 60,000 square feet building and remodeled it to house classrooms, event venues, office spaces, a bookstore, and a theater. Located in the heart of the Dupont Circle neighborhood, the USC Capital Campus is also home to USC's Office of Research Advancement, which helps university faculty researchers secure federal funding for multidisciplinary research projects. USC was developed under two master plans drafted and implemented some forty years apart. The first was prepared by Train & Williams, but it was replaced by the second, made by the Parkinsons in 1919.

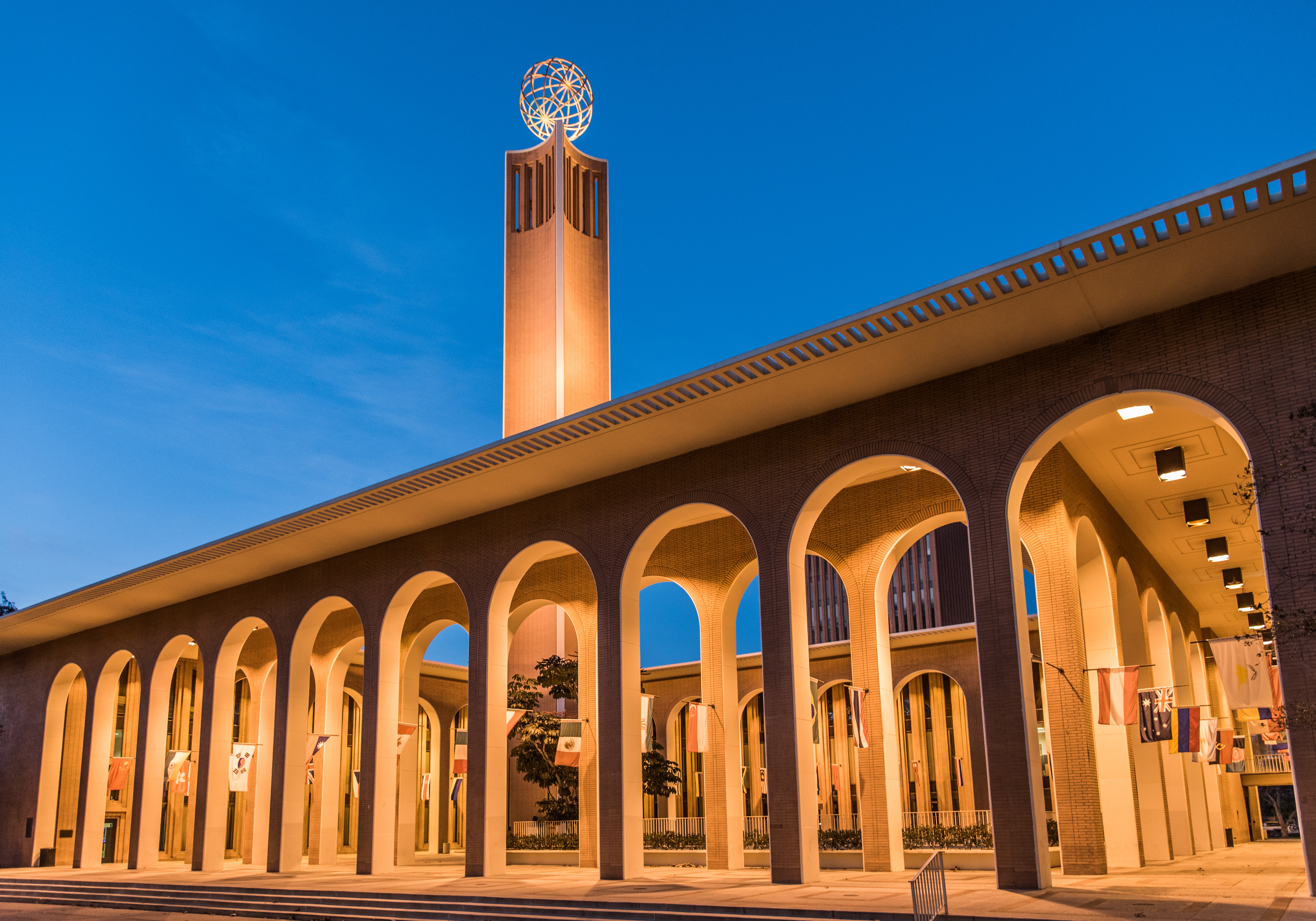
The Center for International and Public Affairs, topped by a 5,500 lb (2,500 kg) globe, is the tallest structure on campus. Built under the second master plan, it reflects a trend towards modernism during that period.

For its role in making visible and sustained improvements in the neighborhoods surrounding both the University Park and Health Sciences campuses, Time/Princeton Review College Guide named it College of the Year 2000. Roughly half of the university's students volunteer in community-service programs in neighborhoods around campus and throughout Los Angeles. These outreach programs, as well as previous administrations' commitment to remaining in South Los Angeles amid widespread calls to move the campus following the 1965 Watts Riots, are credited for the safety of the university during the 1992 Los Angeles Riots. The ZIP Code for USC is 90089 and that of the surrounding University Park community is 90007.

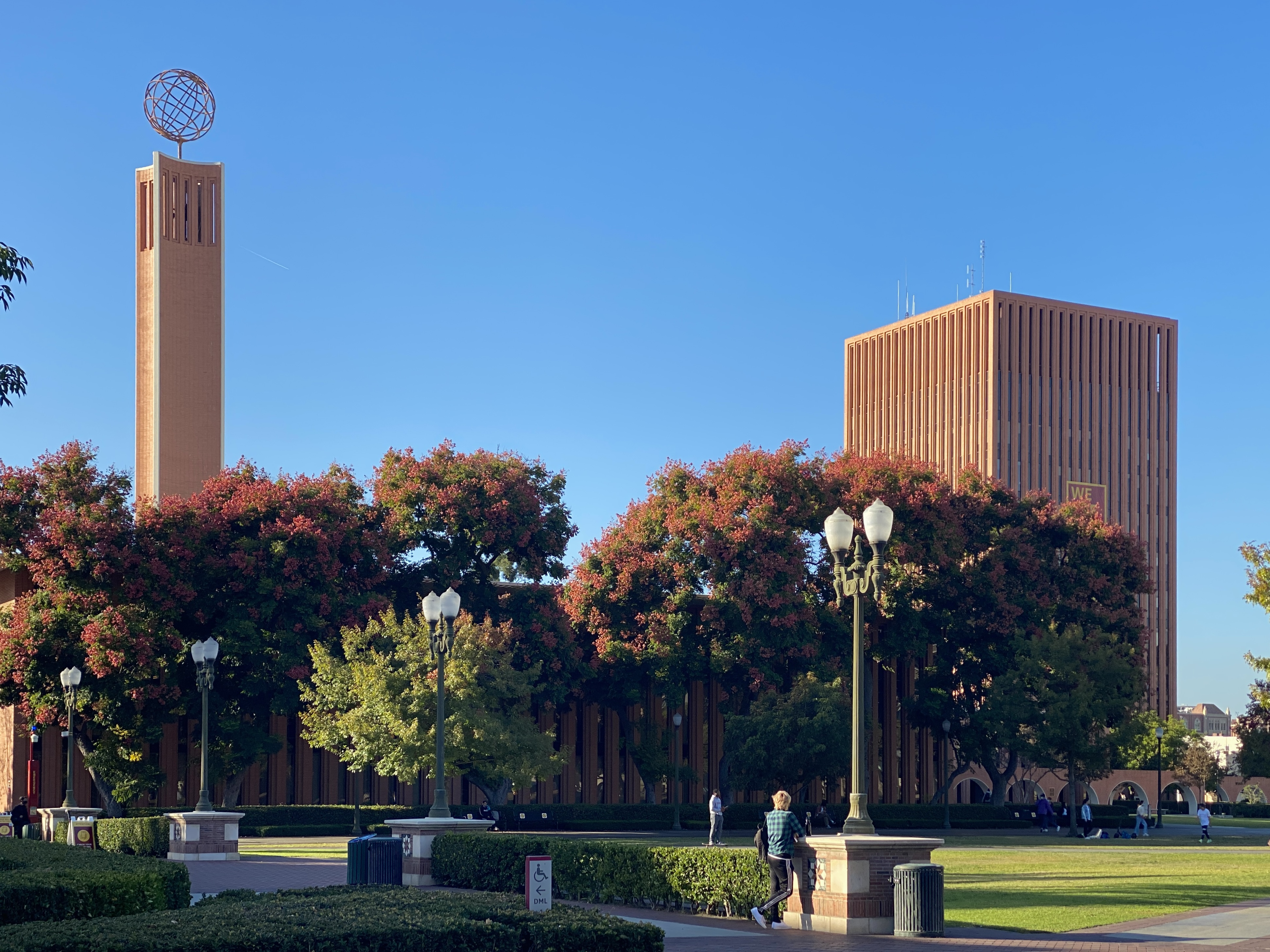
The globe tower and Waite Phillips Hall, home to the USC Rossier School of Education

Traveler horse statue at University of Southern California in Los Angeles

USC has an endowment of $8.1 billion and carries out nearly $1 billion per year in sponsored research.

=== University Village ===
In 1999, USC purchased the University Park shopping center, which was demolished in 2014. In September of the same year, the university began construction on USC Village, a 1.25-million-square-foot residential and retail center directly adjacent to USC's University Park campus on 15 acres of land owned by the university. The USC Village has over 130,000 square feet of retail space on the ground floor, with student housing on the four floors above. The $700 million project is the biggest development in the history of USC and is also one of the largest in the history of South Los Angeles. With a grand opening held on August 17, 2017, the USC Village includes a Trader Joe's, a Target, a fitness center, restaurants, outdoor dining, 400 retail parking spots, a community room, and housing for 2,700 students.

=== Health Sciences campus ===
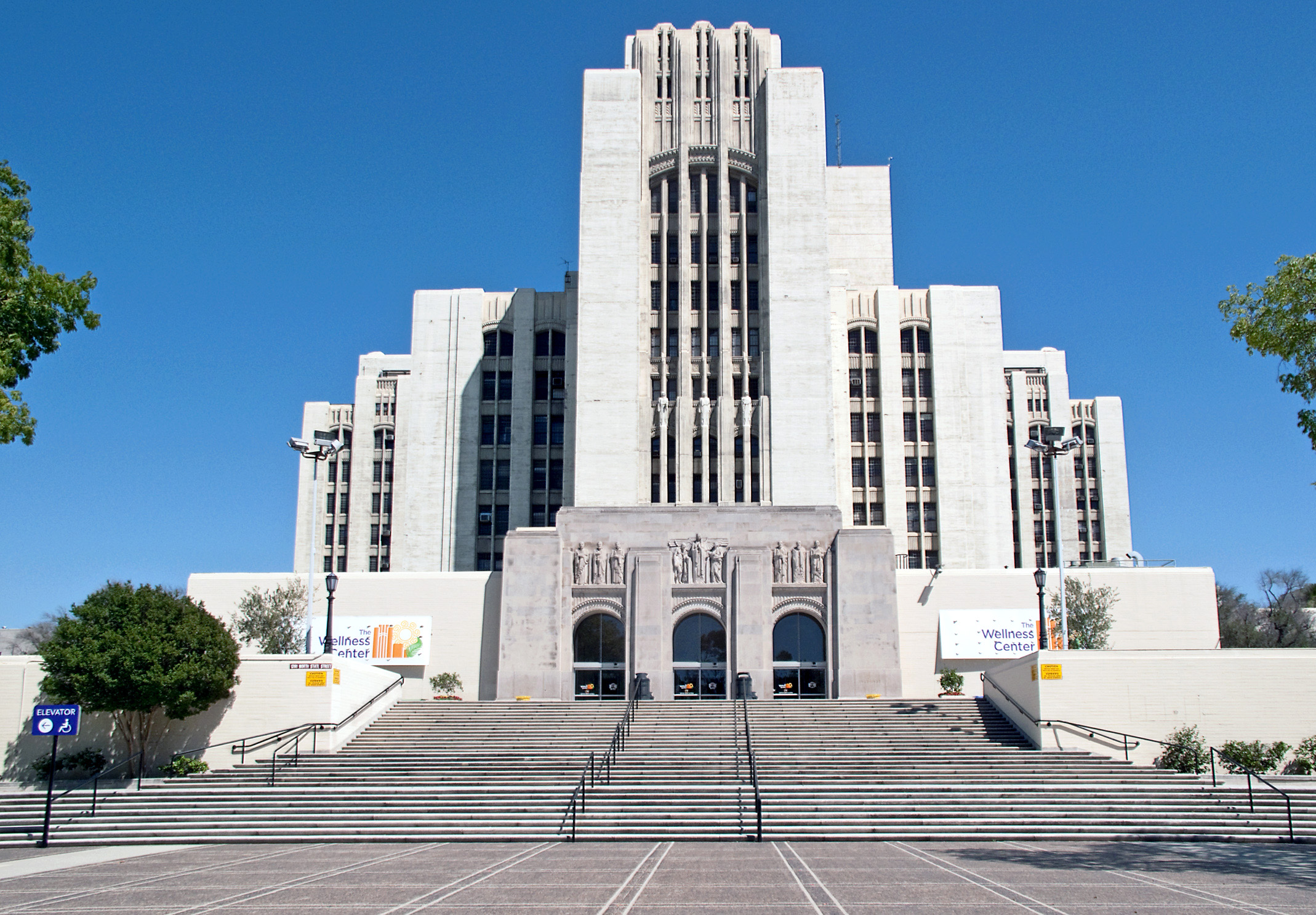
The original Los Angeles County - USC Medical Center

Located three miles (5 km) from downtown Los Angeles and seven miles (11 km) from the University Park campus, USC's Health Sciences campus is a major center for basic and clinical biomedical research in the fields of cancer, gene therapy, the neurosciences, and transplantation biology, among others. The 79-acre (32 ha) campus is home to the region's first and oldest medical and pharmacy schools.

In addition to the Los Angeles County+USC Medical Center, which is one of the nation's largest teaching hospitals, the campus includes three patient care facilities: USC Norris Comprehensive Cancer Center, Keck Hospital of USC, and the USC Eye Institute. USC faculty staffs these and many other hospitals in Southern California, including the internationally acclaimed Children's Hospital Los Angeles. The health sciences campus is also home to the USC School of Pharmacy and several research buildings such as USC/Norris Cancer Research Tower, Institute for Genetic Medicine, Zilkha Neurogenetic Institute, Harlyne J. Norris Cancer Research Tower and Eli and Edythe Broad Center for Regenerative Medicine and Stem Cell Research.

In July 2013, the university expanded its medical services into the foothill communities of northern Los Angeles when it acquired the 185-bed Verdugo Hills Hospital in Glendale, California. USC planned on making at least $30 million in capital improvements to the facility, which was officially renamed USC Verdugo Hills Hospital. This 40-year-old hospital provides the community with a 24-hour emergency department, primary stroke center, maternity/labor and delivery, cardiac rehabilitation, and imaging and diagnostic services.

In July 2022, the university acquired the 348 bed Methodist Hospital of Southern California in Arcadia, California. Renamed USC Arcadia Hospital it is a full-service community hospital offering advanced cardiovascular services including cardiac catheterization, electrophysiology and open-heart surgery. Los Angeles County has designated it as both a heart attack receiving center and a comprehensive stroke center, as well as an Emergency Department Approved for Pediatrics. The hospital also offers a variety of surgical services in orthopaedics, neurosurgery, obstetrics, gynecology, and cancer care, plus physical rehabilitation and many other medical specialties. USC physicians serve more than one million patients each year.

=== Public transit ===
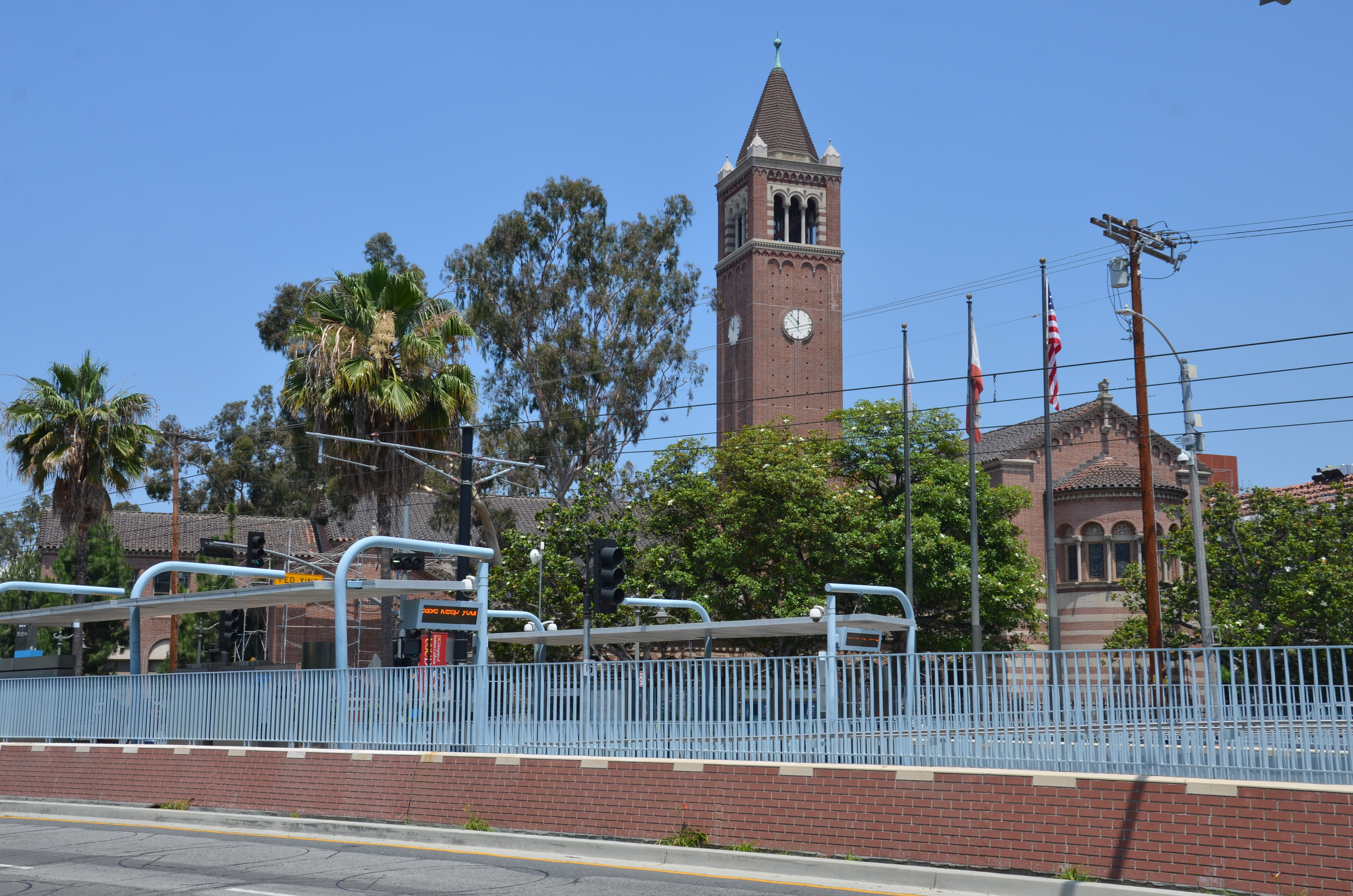
Expo Park/USC station and Mudd Hall of Philosophy in the background

USC is served by several rapid transit stations. The Metro E Line light rail service between Downtown Los Angeles and Santa Monica wraps around the south and eastern edges of the University Park campus. The E Line has three stations in the vicinity of the USC main campus: Jefferson/USC Station, Expo Park/USC Station, and Vermont/Expo Station. The Metro J Line bus service serves both the University Park campus at 37th Street/USC station and the Health Sciences campus at LA General Medical Center station. In addition, both campuses are served by several Metro and municipal bus routes.

=== Former agricultural college campus ===
Chaffey College was founded in 1883 in the city of Ontario, California, as an agricultural college branch campus of USC under the name of Chaffey College of Agriculture of the University of Southern California. USC ran the Chaffey College of Agriculture until financial troubles closed the school in 1901. In 1906, the school was reopened by the municipal and regional government and thus officially separated from USC. Renamed as Chaffey College, it now exists as a community college as part of the California Community College System.

== Organization and administration ==
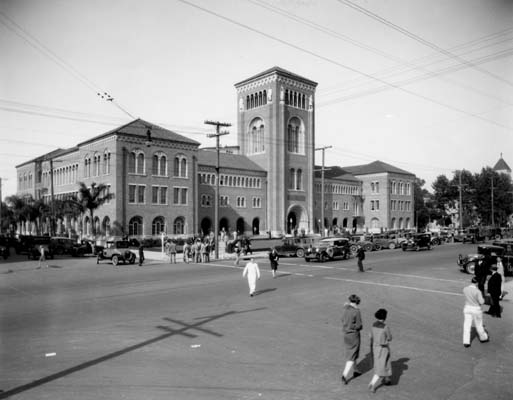
Bovard Hall, shortly after completion in 1921. The streets later became pedestrian-only.

USC is a private public-benefit nonprofit corporation controlled by a board of trustees composed of 50 voting members and several life trustees, honorary trustees, and trustees emeriti who do not vote. Voting members of the board of trustees are elected for five-year terms. One-fifth of the Trustees stand for re-election each year, and votes are cast only by the trustees not standing for election. Trustees tend to be high-ranking executives of large corporations (both domestic and international), successful alumni, members of the upper echelons of university administration, or some combination of the three.

The university administration consists of a president, a provost, several vice-presidents of various departments, a treasurer, a chief information officer, and an athletic director. The current president is Beong-Soo Kim who on July 1, 2025, succeeded Carol Folt.

The USC Dana and David Dornsife College of Letters, Arts, and Sciences, the Graduate School, and the twenty professional schools are each led by an academic dean. USC occasionally awards emeritus titles to former administrators. There are six administrators emeriti. The University of Southern California's twenty professional schools include the USC Leventhal School of Accounting, USC School of Architecture, USC Roski School of Art and Design, USC Iovine and Young Academy, USC Marshall School of Business, USC School of Cinematic Arts, USC Annenberg School for Communication and Journalism, USC Glorya Kaufman School of Dance, Herman Ostrow School of Dentistry of USC, USC School of Dramatic Arts, USC Rossier School of Education, USC Viterbi School of Engineering, USC Leonard Davis School of Gerontology, USC Gould School of Law, Keck School of Medicine of USC, USC Thornton School of Music, USC School of Pharmacy, USC Bovard College, USC Sol Price School of Public Policy, and USC Suzanne Dworak-Peck School of Social Work.

=== Student government ===
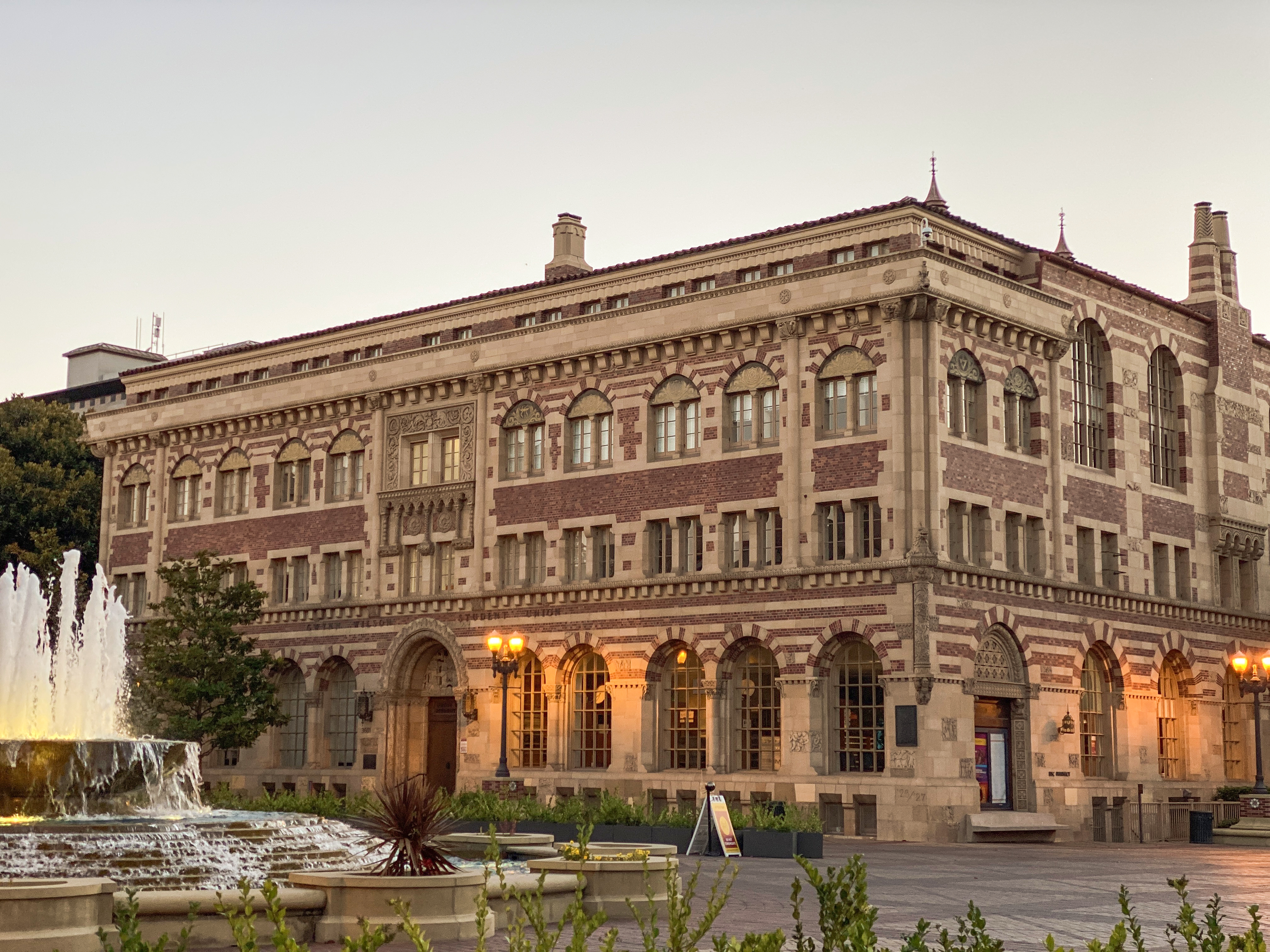
The Gwynn Wilson Student Union on the University Park campus

The Undergraduate Student Government (USG) is the official representative government of the undergraduate students at USC. It consists of a popularly elected president and vice president who lead an appointed executive cabinet, a popularly elected legislative branch, and judicial oversight. The executive cabinet oversees funding, communications, programming, and advocacy work. All USG activities are funded by the student activity fee. In addition to USG, residents within university housing are represented and governed by the Residential Housing Association (RHA), which is divided by residence hall. The Graduate Student Government (GSG) consists of senators elected by the students of each school proportional to its enrollment and its activities are funded by a graduate and professional student activity fee.

=== List of university presidents ===
Since 1880, the following persons have led USC:

No.	Image	Name	Term start	Term end	Refs.
1		Marion M. Bovard	1880	December 29, 1891	
2		Joseph P. Widney	1892	July 1895	
3		George W. White	September 1895	September 1899	
4		George F. Bovard	April 28, 1903	December 5, 1921	
5		Rufus B. von KleinSmid	December 6, 1921	August 31, 1947	
6		Fred D. Fagg, Jr.	September 1, 1947	June 30, 1957	
University led by a committee of three vice-presidents from July 1957 to August 1958
7		Norman Topping	September 1, 1958	August 2, 1970	
8		John R. Hubbard	August 3, 1970	August 2, 1980	
9		James H. Zumberge	August 3, 1980	February 28, 1991	
10		Steven B. Sample	March 1, 1991	August 2, 2010	
11		C. L. Max Nikias	August 3, 2010	August 7, 2018	
interim		Wanda Austin	August 8, 2018	June 30, 2019	
12		Carol Folt	July 1, 2019	June 30, 2025	
interim		Beong-Soo Kim	July 1, 2025	February 4, 2026	
13		Beong-Soo Kim	February 4, 2026	Present	

=== Department of Public Safety ===
The USC Department of Public Safety (DPS) is one of the largest campus law enforcement agencies in the United States, currently employing over 300 full-time personnel, including approximately 96 armed Public Safety Officers, 120 unarmed Community Service Officers, 60 CCTV monitors and dispatchers, and 30 part-time student workers. DPS's patrol and response jurisdiction includes a 2.5 square mile area around each USC campus. The Department of Public Safety headquarters is on the University Park campus, and there are substations in the University Village and on the Health Sciences campus. The department operates 24 hours a day, 365 days a year. All USC Public Safety Officers are required to be police academy graduates so that under California Penal Code statute they can be granted peace officer power of arrest authority while on duty, enforce state laws and local city municipal codes, and investigate crimes. DPS is overseen by an independent advisory board of 21 faculty, staff, student and community members appointed by the USC president. The board reviews DPS performance, stop, and misconduct data, and conducts periodic assessments of DPS policies, practices, and operational performance.

The department has a formal working relationship with the Los Angeles Police Department (LAPD), which includes USC paying for newly hired Public Safety Officers to attend the six month-long Los Angeles Police Academy. A special joint USC/LAPD crime task force composed of USC DPS personnel and approximately 40 selected Los Angeles police officers, including a dedicated specially trained LAPD SWAT team, is assigned exclusively to the USC campus community to address crime and quality of life issues.

== Academics ==
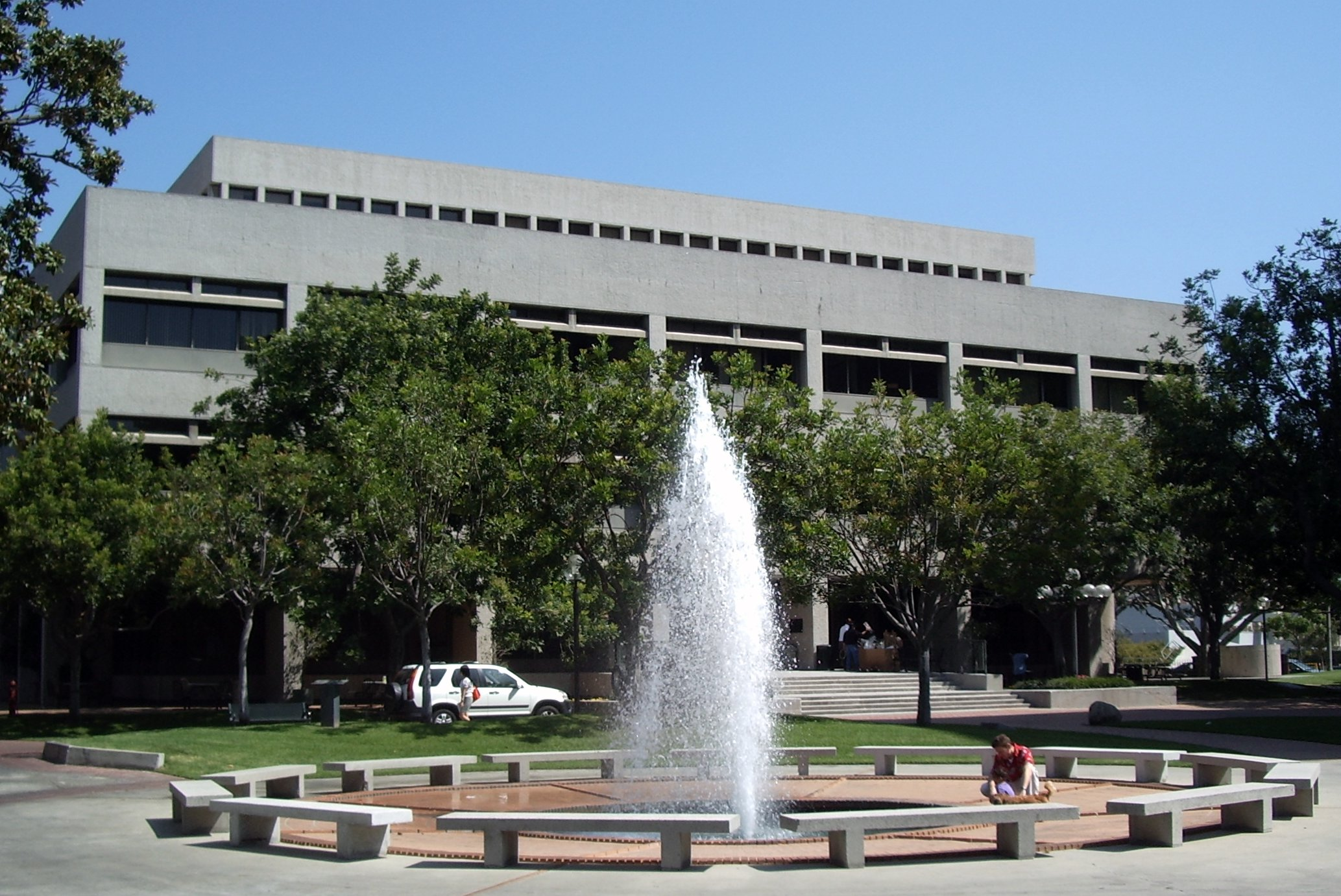
The law school building is one example of Brutalist architecture on USC's main campus.

USC is a large, primarily residential research university. The majority of the student body was undergraduate until 2007, when graduate student enrollment began to exceed undergraduate. The four-year, full-time undergraduate instructional program is classified as "balanced arts & sciences/professions" with a high graduate coexistence. Admissions are characterized as "most selective, lower transfer in"; 95 undergraduate majors and 147 academic and professional minors are offered. The graduate program is classified as "comprehensive" and offers 134 master's, doctoral, and professional degrees through twenty professional schools. USC is accredited by the Western Association of Schools and Colleges - Senior College and University Commission. USC's academic departments fall either under the general liberal arts and sciences of the Dana and David Dornsife College of Letters, Arts, and Sciences for undergraduate programs, the Graduate School for graduate programs, or the university's 20 professional schools.

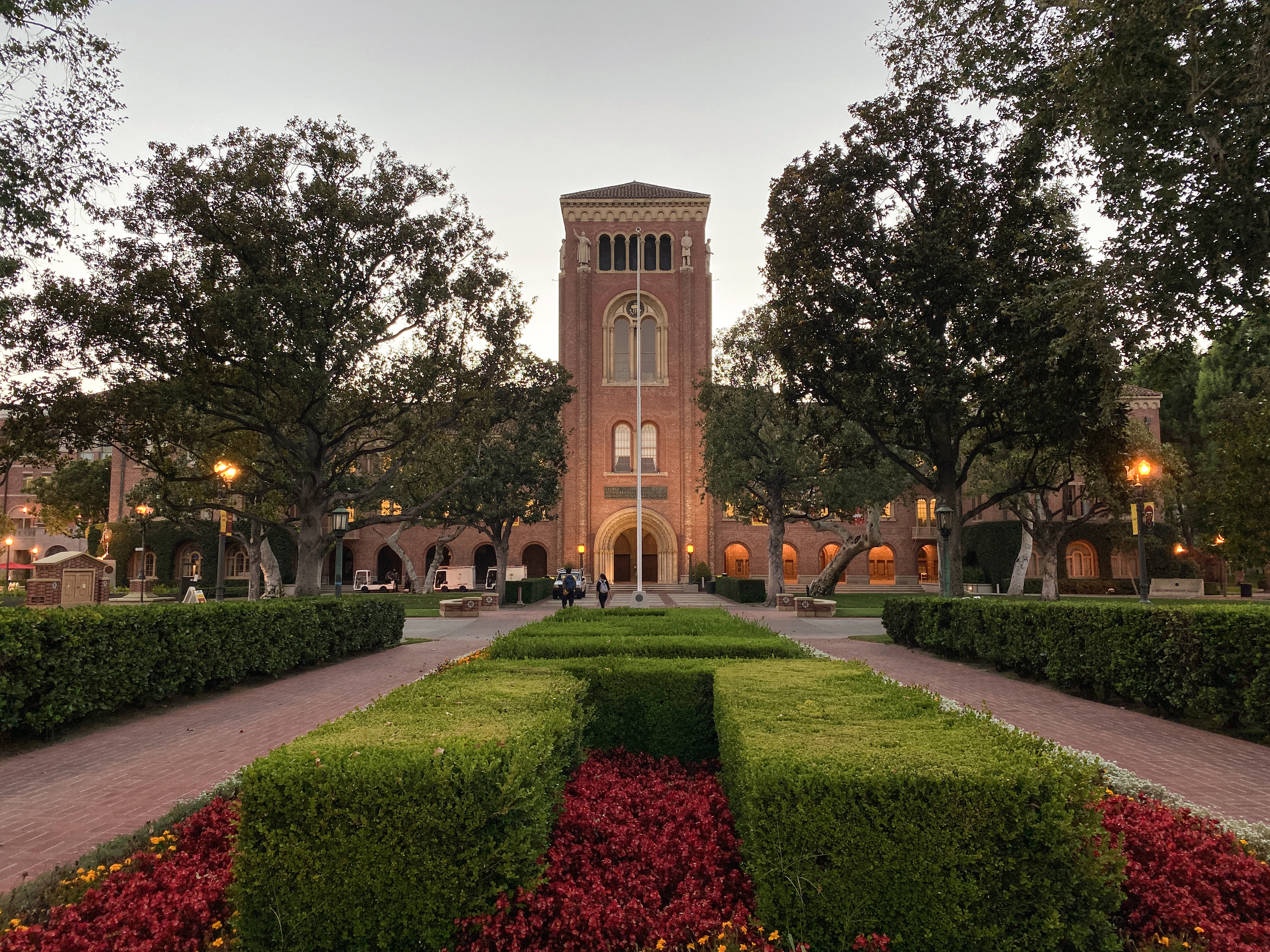
Bovard Auditorium

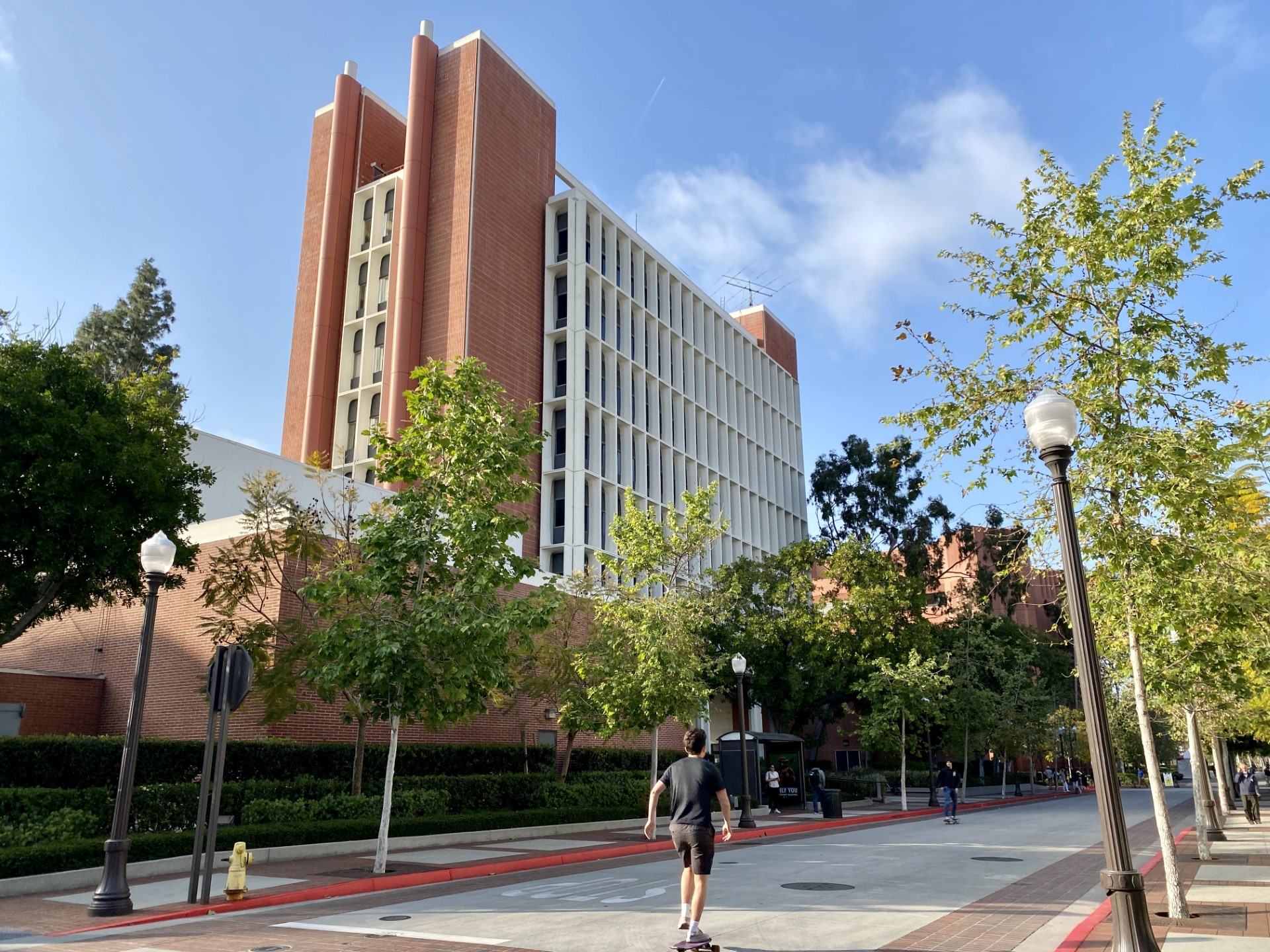
Vivian Hall, part of the Viterbi School of Engineering complex

The USC Dana and David Dornsife College of Letters, Arts, and Sciences, the oldest and largest of the USC schools, grants undergraduate degrees in more than 180 majors and minors across the humanities, social sciences, and natural/physical sciences, and offers doctoral and masters programs in more than twenty fields. Dornsife College is responsible for the general education program for all USC undergraduates and houses a full-time faculty of almost 1,000, nearly 8,000 undergraduate majors (over a third of the total USC undergraduate population), and 1,300 doctoral students. In addition to thirty academic departments, the college also houses dozens of research centers and institutes. In the 2008–2009 academic year, 4,400 undergraduate degrees and 5,500 advanced degrees were awarded. Formerly called "USC College of Letters, Arts & Sciences", the college received a $200 million gift from USC trustees Dana and David Dornsife on March 23, 2011, after which the college was renamed in their honor, following the naming pattern of other professional schools and departments at the university. All PhD degrees awarded at USC and most master's degrees are under the jurisdiction of the Graduate School. Professional degrees are awarded by each of the respective professional schools.

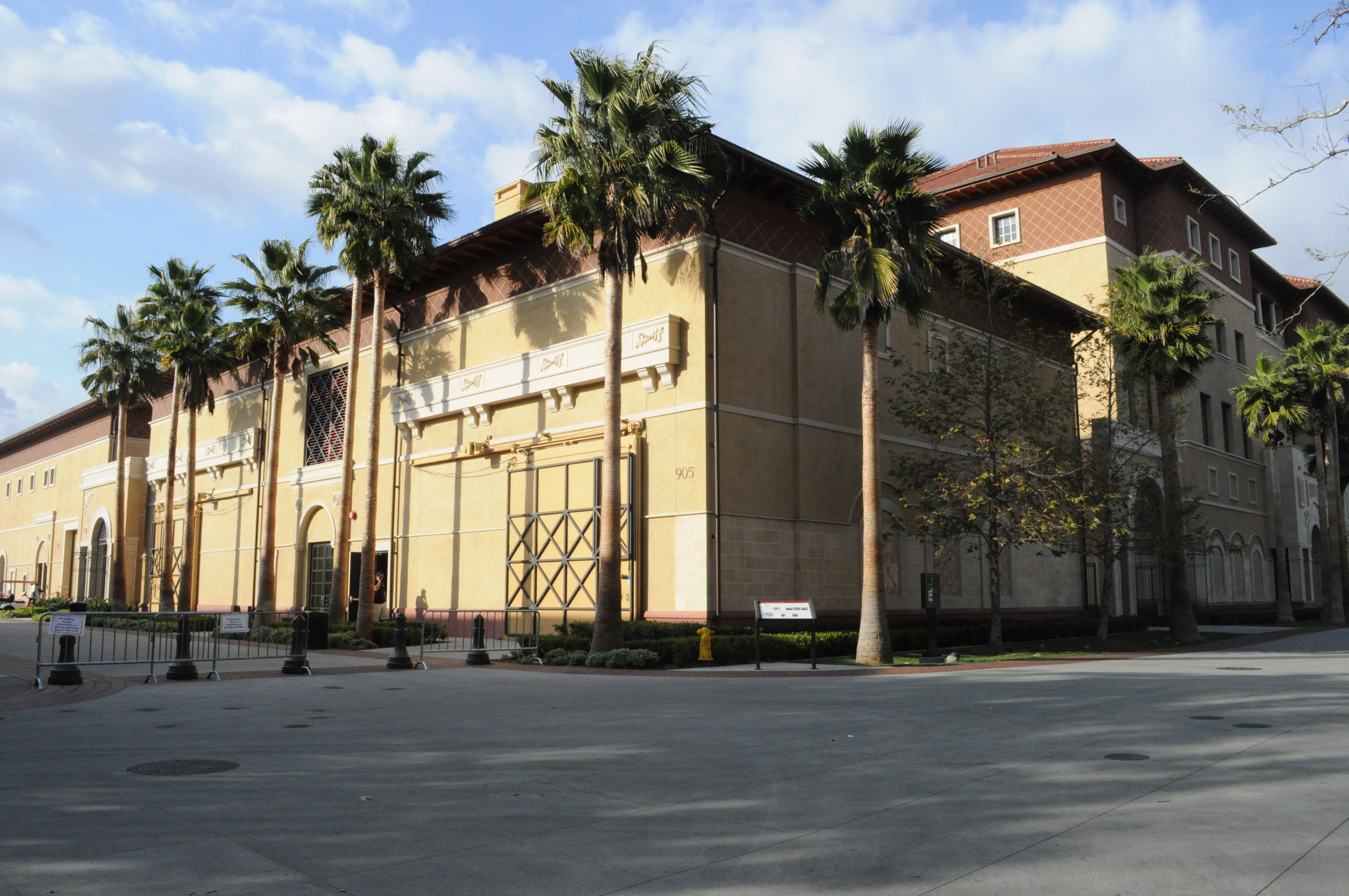
The USC School of Cinematic Arts

The School of Cinematic Arts, the oldest and largest film school in the country, confers degrees in six different programs. As the university administration considered cinematic skills too valuable to be kept to film industry professionals, the school opened its classes to the university at large in 1998. In 2001, the film school added an Interactive Media & Games Division studying stereoscopic cinema, panoramic cinema, immersive cinema, interactive cinema, video games, virtual reality, and mobile media. In September 2006, George Lucas donated $175 million to expand the film school, which at the time was the largest single donation to USC (and its fifth over $100 million). The donation will be used to build new structures and expand the faculty. The acceptance rate to the School of Cinematic Arts has consistently remained between 4–6% for the past several years.

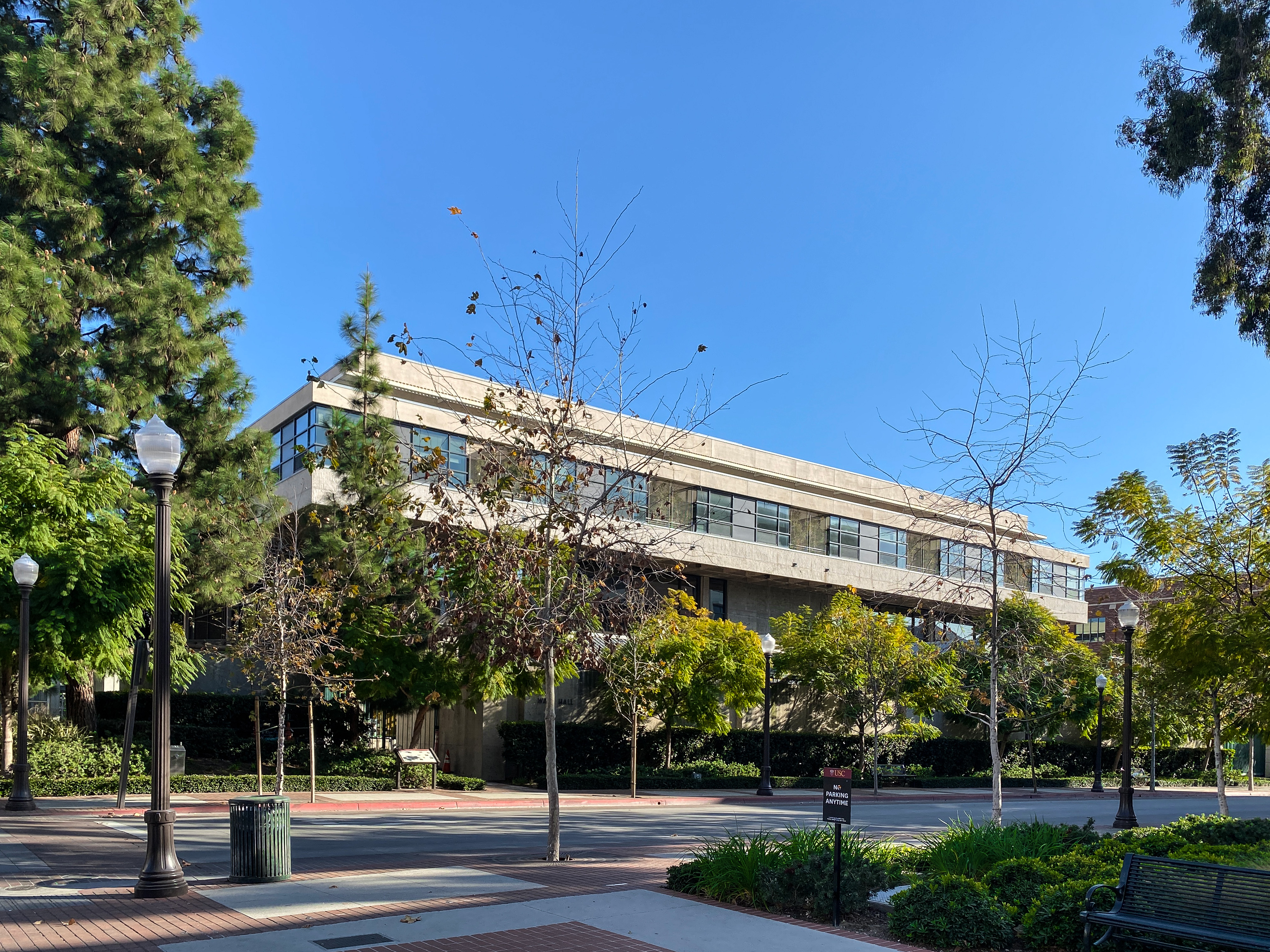
Watt Hall houses the USC School of Architecture and the Roski School of Art and Design.

The USC School of Architecture was established in 1916, the first in Southern California. From at least 1972 to 1976, and likely for a number of years prior to 1972, it was called The School of Architecture and Fine Art. The School of Fine Art (known as SOFA for a number of years after Architecture and Fine Art separated) was eventually named the Roski School of Fine Arts in 2006 during a ceremony to open the then-new Masters of Fine Art building, which occupies the previous and completely refurbished Lucky Blue Jean factory. This small department grew rapidly with the help of the Allied Architects of Los Angeles. A separate School of Architecture was organized in September 1925. The school has been home to teachers such as Richard Neutra, Ralph Knowles, James Steele, A. Quincy Jones, William Pereira and Pierre Koenig. The school of architecture also claims notable alumni Frank Gehry, Jon Jerde, Thom Mayne, Raphael Soriano, Gregory Ain, and Pierre Koenig. Two of the alumni have become Pritzker Prize winners.

The Andrew and Erna Viterbi School of Engineering was previously the USC School of Engineering but was renamed on March 2, 2004, in honor of Qualcomm co-founder Andrew Viterbi and his wife Erna, who had donated $52 million to the school. Viterbi School of Engineering has been ranked No. 11 and No. 9 in the United States in U.S. News & World Report's engineering rankings for 2018 and 2019 respectively.

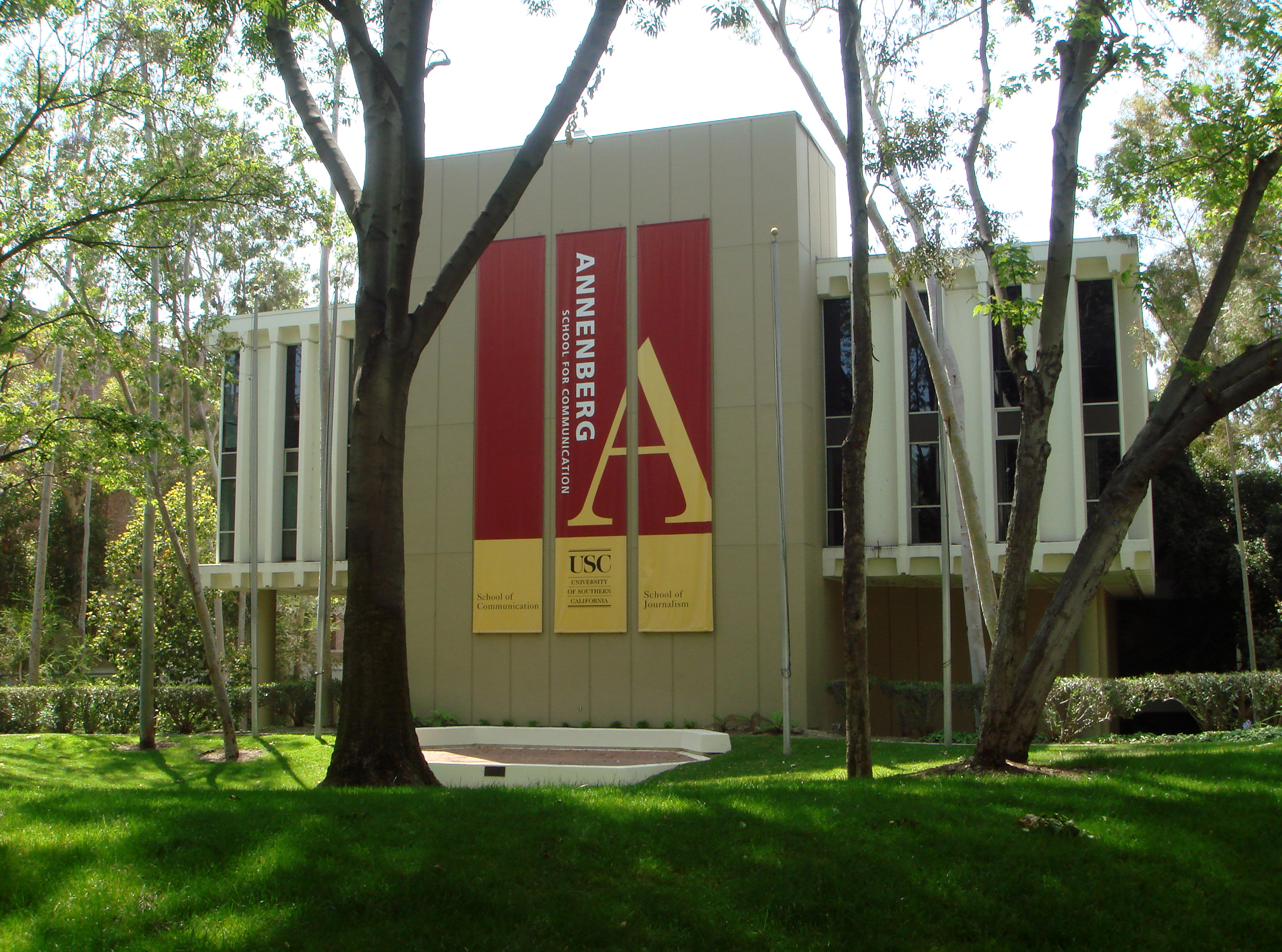
The Annenberg School for Communication & Journalism

The Annenberg School for Communication & Journalism, founded in 1971, is one of the two communication programs in the country endowed by Walter Annenberg (the other is at the University of Pennsylvania). The School of Journalism, which became part of the School for Communication in 1994, features a core curriculum that requires students to devote themselves equally to print, broadcast and online media for the first year of study. The journalism school consistently ranks among the nation's top undergraduate journalism schools. USC's Annenberg School's endowment rose from $7.5 million to $218 million between 1996 and 2007. In 2015, the new building named for Wallis Annenberg started serving all faculty and students.

The Herman Ostrow School of Dentistry at the University of Southern California was established in 1897 as The College of Dentistry, and today, awards undergraduate and graduate degrees. The school traditionally has maintained five Divisions: Academic Affairs & Student Life, Clinical Affairs, Continuing Education, Research, and Community Health Programs and Hospital Affairs. In 2006, the USC Department of Physical Therapy and Biokinesiology, and the USC Department of Occupational Science and Occupational Therapy, which both had previously been organized as "Independent Health Professions" programs at the USC College of Letters, Arts, and Sciences, were administratively aligned under the School of Dentistry and renamed "Divisions," bringing the total number of Divisions at the School of Dentistry to seven. In 2010, alumnus Herman Ostrow donated $35 million to name the school the Herman Ostrow School of Dentistry. In 2013, the school introduced an eighth division, and in 2014, a $20 million gift endowed and named the USC Mrs. T.H. Chan Division of Occupational Science and Occupational Therapy.

USC collaborated with Shanghai Jiao Tong University to offer the USC Executive MBA program in Shanghai. USC Dornsife also operates two international study centers in Paris and Madrid. The Marshall School of Business has satellite campuses in Orange County and San Diego. In 2012, USC established the Glorya Kaufman School of Dance, the university's first new school in forty years, which was a gift from philanthropist Glorya Kaufman. The USC Kaufman School offers individual classes in technique, performance, choreography, production, theory and history open to all students at USC. In the fall of 2015, the USC Glorya Kaufman School of Dance began to offer a Bachelor of Fine Arts degree to a select number of undergraduates who wish to pursue dance as their major. This four-year professional degree is housed in the state-of-the-art Glorya Kaufman International Dance Center. In 2015, USC established the Bovard College, which offers graduate-level programs in Human Resource Management, Project Management, and Criminal Justice. The college is named after Emma Bovard, who was one of the first students to enroll at USC in 1880.

=== University library system ===
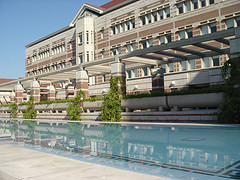
The Leavey Library, completed in the mid-1990s, reflected a shift to earlier Romanesque architecture in that era. It is USC's newest library.

Interior of the Doheny Memorial Library.

The USC Libraries are among the oldest private academic research libraries in California. For more than a century USC has been building collections in support of the university's teaching and research interests. Especially noteworthy collections include American literature, Cinema-Television including the Warner Bros. studio archives, European philosophy, gerontology, German exile literature, international relations, Korean studies, studies of Latin America, natural history, Southern California history, and the University Archives.

The USC Warner Bros. Archives is the largest single studio collection in the world. Donated in 1977 to the University of Southern California's School of Cinematic Arts by Warner Communications, the WBA houses departmental records that detail Warner Bros. activities from the studio's first major feature, My Four Years in Germany (1918), to its sale to Seven Arts in 1968. Announced in June 2006, the testimony of 52,000 survivors, rescuers, and others involved in The Holocaust is housed in the USC College of Letters, Arts & Sciences as a part of the USC Shoah Foundation Institute for Visual History and Education. The Shoah Foundation is on the 4th floor of Leavy Library.

In addition to the Shoah Foundation, the USC Libraries digital collection highlights include photographs from the California Historical Society, Korean American Archives Automobile Club of Southern California, and the Chinese Historical Society of Southern California. The USC Digital Library provides a wealth of primary and original source material in a variety of formats. In October 2010, the collections at ONE National Gay & Lesbian Archives, the largest repository for documents from the LGBT community in the world, became a part of the USC Libraries system. The collections at ONE include over two million archival items documenting LGBT history including periodicals; books; film, video and audio recordings; photographs; artworks; ephemera, such clothing, costumes, and buttons; organizational records; and personal paper.

USC's 22 libraries and other archives hold nearly 4 million printed volumes, 6 million items in microform, and 3 million photographs and subscribe to more than 30,000 current serial titles, nearly 44,000 feet (13,000 m) of manuscripts and archives, and subscribe to over 120 electronic databases and more than 14,000 journals in print and electronic formats. Annually, reference transactions number close to 50,000 and approximately 1,100 instructional presentations are made to 16,000 participants. The University of Southern California Library system is among the top 35 largest university library systems in the United States. The Leavey Library is the undergraduate library and is open 24 hours a day. The newly open basement has many discussion tables for students to share thoughts and have group discussions. The Edward L. Doheny, Jr. Memorial Library is the main research library on campus.

=== Rankings and reputation ===
Academic rankings

National
- Forbes: 26
- U.S. News & World Report: 27
- WSJ/College Pulse: 20

Global
- ARWU: 68
- QS: 153
- THE: 73
- U.S. News & World Report: 74

National program rankings
Program	Ranking
Accounting	4
Biological Sciences	46
Business	14
Chemistry	46
Clinical Psychology	14
Computer Science	21
Earth Sciences	33
Economics	12
Engineering	20
English	36
Fine Arts	53
Health Care Management	9
History	16
Law	26
Mathematics	37
Nursing–Anesthesia	19
Occupational Therapy	2
Pharmacy	12
Physical Therapy	4
Physician Assistant	26
Physics	55
Psychology	30
Public Affairs	3
Public Health	17
Social Work	67
Sociology	32
Urban Policy	2

Global program rankings
Program	Ranking
Artificial Intelligence	19
Arts & Humanities	76
Biology & Biochemistry	65
Biotechnology & Applied Microbiology	91
Cardiac & Cardiovascular Systems	196
Cell Biology	74
Chemistry	337
Clinical Medicine	67
Computer Science	76
Economics & Business	25
Education & Educational Research	90
Electrical & Electronic Engineering	163
Endocrinology & Metabolism	72
Engineering	139
Environment/Ecology	456
Gastroenterology & Hepatology	78
Geosciences	124
Immunology	194
Infectious Diseases	241
Materials Science	281
Mathematics	169
Microbiology	101
Molecular Biology & Genetics	54
Neuroscience & Behavior	38
Oncology	64
Optics	111
Pharmacology & Toxicology	147
Physical Chemistry	275
Physics	438
Psychiatry/Psychology	63
Radiology, Nuclear Medicine & Medical Imaging	81
Social Sciences & Public Health	48
Surgery	63

USC was ranked 20th in U.S. News & World Report's 2025 annual ranking of national universities.

== Student body ==
Undergraduate demographics as of Fall 2024
Race and ethnicity	Total
White	24.5%
Hispanic	22.5%
Asian	22.3%
Foreign national	13.2%
Black	6.8%
Two or more races	6.1%
Unknown	4.2%
Native Hawaiian/Pacific Islander	.2%
Native American/Alaska Native	.2%
Economic diversity
Low-income (Note: The percentage of students who received an income-based federal Pell grant intended for low-income students.)	27%
Affluent (Note: The percentage of students who are a part of the American middle class at the bare minimum.)	73%

As of the 2025-2026 academic year, USC has a total enrollment of roughly 45,815 students, of which 20,768 are at the undergraduate and 25,047 at the graduate and professional levels. Approximately 53% of students are female and 47% are male. For the entering first-year class in 2020, 43% of incoming students are drawn from California, 42% from the rest of the United States, and 15% from abroad. In the academic year 2014–2015, USC's student body encompasses 12,300 international students, the second most out of all universities in the United States. Of the regularly enrolled international students, the most represented countries/regions are China (Hong Kong, Macau, and Taiwan not included), India, South Korea, and Taiwan, in that order.

Like other private universities, the nominal cost of attendance is high; however, the university's large endowment and significant revenue streams allow it to offer generous financial aid packages. As of 2025, the average aid package was $71,169 among those who received aid. USC also offer some very competitive and highly valued merit-based scholarships (the full-tuition, four-year Mork Family, Stamps and Trustee scholarships; the half-tuition Presidential Scholarship; the one-quarter tuition Deans Scholarship), with only 5.5% of scholarship applicants being selected as finalists for the final interview invitation at the USC campus in spring. This makes USC one of the highest-ranked universities to offer half-tuition and full-tuition merit-based scholarships. These factors have propelled USC into being the 4th most economically diverse university in the nation.

USC enrolls one of the highest number of National Merit Scholars of any university, offering finalists in the program its half-tuition Presidential Scholarship. As of 2021, about 72% of the student body receives about $810 million in financial aid annually. Twenty percent of admitted and attending students are SCions, or students with familial ties to USC, while 14 percent are the first generation in their family to attend any form of college. Twenty-four percent of undergraduates at USC are Pell Grant-eligible, which is defined by having come from a family household income of less than $50,000. There are over 375,000 living Trojan alumni. The USC-MSA reference is a numbering system developed by the Muslim Students' Association of the University of Southern California to access their database of the six major Hadith collections. Although the project currently parked, the referencing remains widely used throughout the Internet.

=== Undergraduate admissions ===
Undergraduate admission statistics
	Fall 2025	Fall 2024	Fall 2023	Fall 2022	Fall 2021
First-time Freshmen
Applicants	83,488	82,027	79,936	69,062	71,031
Admits	9,345	8,050	7,998	8,304	8,884
Admit rate	11%	10%	10%	12%	13%
Enrolled	3,759	3,489	3,588	3,420	3,668
Yield rate	40%	43%	45%	41%	41%
Transfers
Applicants	10,827	11,019	9,448	9,100	9,988
Admits	2,929	2,381	2,310	2,141	2,208
Admit rate	27%	22%	24%	24%	22%
Enrolled	1,544	1,339	1,335	1,295	1,353
Yield rate	53%	56%	58%	60%	61%

USC is ranked by U.S. News & World Report as "Most Selective," and Princeton Review rates its admissions selectivity of 98 out of 99. Over 70,000 students applied for admission to the undergraduate class entering in 2021, with 12% being admitted.

USC was ranked the 10th most applied to university in the nation for fall 2014 by U.S. News & World Report. Admission is need-blind for domestic applicants.

== Faculty and research ==
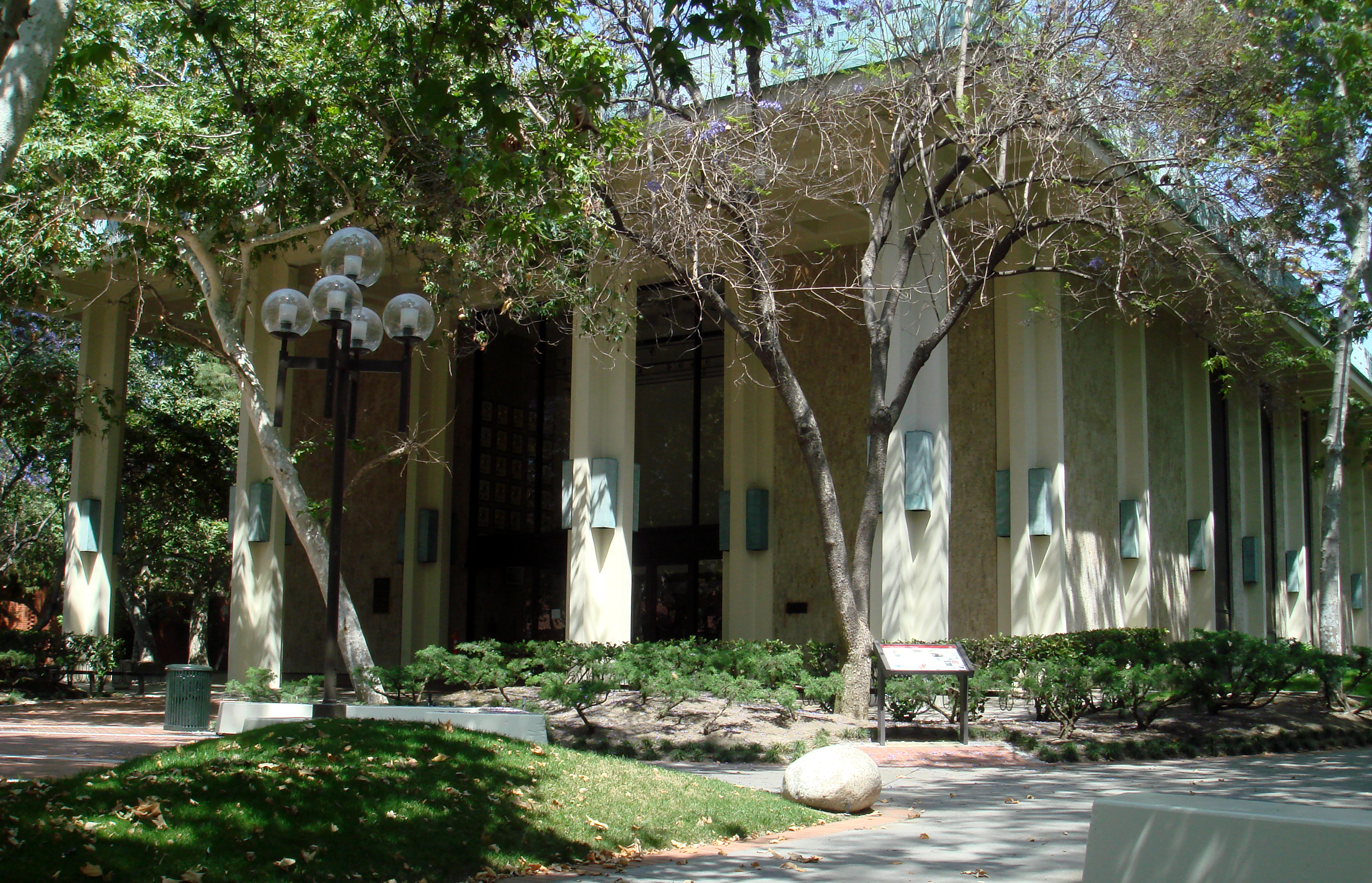
The Eileen L. Norris Cinema Theatre, where the THX sound system was first developed and installed by Tomlinson Holman.

The university is classified among "R1: Doctoral Universities – Very high research activity". According to the National Science Foundation, USC spent $891 million on research and development in 2018, ranking it 23rd in the nation. USC employs approximately 4,706 full-time faculty, 1,816 part-time faculty, 16,614 staff members, and 4,817 student workers. 350 postdoctoral fellows are supported along with over 800 medical residents. Among the USC faculty, 17 are members of the National Academy of Sciences, 16 are members of the National Academy of Medicine, 37 are members of the National Academy of Engineering, 97 are members of the American Association for the Advancement of Science, and 34 are members of the American Academy of Arts and Sciences, 5 to the American Philosophical Society, and 14 to the National Academy of Public Administration. 29 USC faculty are listed as among the "Highly Cited" in the Institute for Scientific Information database. George Olah won the 1994 Nobel Prize in Chemistry and was the founding director of the Loker Hydrocarbon Research Institute. Leonard Adleman won the Turing Award in 2003. Arieh Warshel won the 2013 Nobel Prize in Chemistry.

The university also supports the Pacific Council on International Policy through joint programming, leadership collaboration, and facilitated connections among students, faculty, and Pacific Council members. The university has two National Science Foundation–funded Engineering Research Centers: the Integrated Media Systems Center and the Center for Biomimetic Microelectronic Systems. The Department of Homeland Security selected USC as its first Homeland Security Center of Excellence. Since 1991, USC has been the headquarters of the NSF and USGS funded Southern California Earthquake Center (SCEC). The University of Southern California is a founding and charter member of CENIC, the Corporation for Education Network Initiatives in California, the nonprofit organization, which provides extremely high-performance Internet-based networking to California's K-20 research and education community. USC researcher Jonathan Postel was an editor of communications-protocol for the fledgling internet, also known as ARPANET, for which USC was one of the earliest nodes.

In July 2016, USC became home to the world's most powerful quantum computer, housed in a super-cooled, magnetically shielded facility at the USC Information Sciences Institute, the only other commercially available quantum computing system operated jointly by NASA and Google. Notable USC faculty include or have included the following: Leonard Adleman, Richard Bellman, Aimee Bender, Barry Boehm, Warren Bennis, Todd Boyd, T.C. Boyle, Leo Buscaglia, Drew Casper, Manuel Castells, Erwin Chemerinsky, George V. Chilingar, Thomas Crow, António Damásio, Francis De Erdely, Percival Everett, Murray Gell-Mann, Seymour Ginsburg, G. Thomas Goodnight, Jane Goodall, Solomon Golomb, Midori Goto, Susan Estrich, Janet Fitch, Tomlinson Holman, Jascha Heifetz, Henry Jenkins, Thomas H. Jordan, Mark Kac, Pierre Koenig, Neil Leach, Leonard Maltin, Daniel L. McFadden, Viet Thanh Nguyen, George Olah, Scott Page, Tim Page (music critic), Simon Ramo, Claudia Rankine, Irving Reed, Jacob Soll, Michael Waterman, Frank Gehry, Arieh Warshel, Lloyd Welch, Jonathan Taplin, Diane Winston, and Gabriel Zada.

In February 2023, USC Graduate Student Workers voted 93% to unionize with the United Auto Workers, becoming the first academic worker union at a private university in Los Angeles. Workers voted to form a union by a vote of 1,599–122. The union campaign of over 3,000 research assistants, teaching assistants, and assistant lecturers garnered support from numerous California elected officials, including United States senator Alex Padilla and Los Angeles City Councilman Hugo Soto-Martinez.

In 2026, an off-campus Chabad house serving USC reopened after a major expansion, with facilities including a synagogue, student housing and a rooftop kosher restaurant.

== Athletics ==
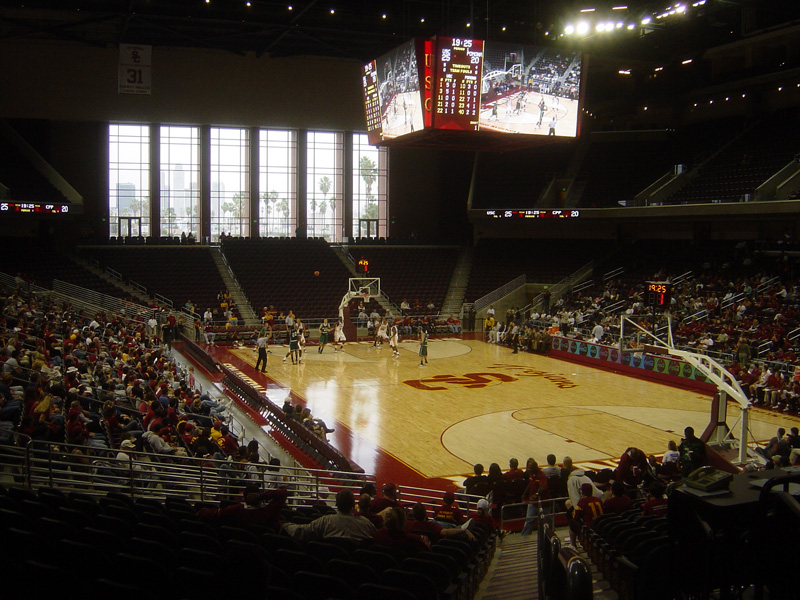
The Galen Center, home of USC basketball and volleyball

The USC Trojans participate in the NCAA Division I Football Bowl Subdivision (FBS) as part of the Big Ten Conference. USC student athletes have won 123 total team national championships, 97 for men and 26 for women, including non-NCAA championships. Of this total, 80 and 14 are NCAA national championships for men and women, respectively. The NCAA does not include college football championships in its calculation. Although there are multiple organizations that name national champions, USC claims 11 football championships. The men's 361 individual championships are the second-best in the nation and 53 ahead of third place, the Texas Longhorns. USC's cross-town rival is the University of California, Los Angeles (UCLA), with whom there is fierce athletic and scholastic competition. USC's rivalry with Notre Dame predates the UCLA rivalry by three years. The Notre Dame rivalry stems mainly from the annual football game played between these two universities and is considered one of the greatest rivalries in college athletics.

USC has won 113 NCAA team championships, third most behind Stanford (135) and cross-town rival UCLA (123). The Trojans have also won at least one national team title in 26 consecutive years (1959–1960 to 1984–1985). USC won the National College All-Sports Championship, an annual ranking by USA Today of the country's top athletic programs, 6 times since its inception in 1971. Four Trojans have won the James E. Sullivan Award as the top amateur athlete in America: diver Sammy Lee (1953), shot putter Parry O'Brien (1959), swimmer John Naber (1977) and swimmer Janet Evans (1989). From the 1904 Summer Olympics through the 2014 Winter Olympics, 632 Trojan athletes have competed in the Games, taking home 144 gold medals, 93 silver and 72 bronze. If it were an independent country, USC would be ranked 13th in the world in 2016 in terms of medals. Since 1912, USC is the only university in the world to have a gold medal-winning athlete in every summer Olympiad.

=== Men's sports ===
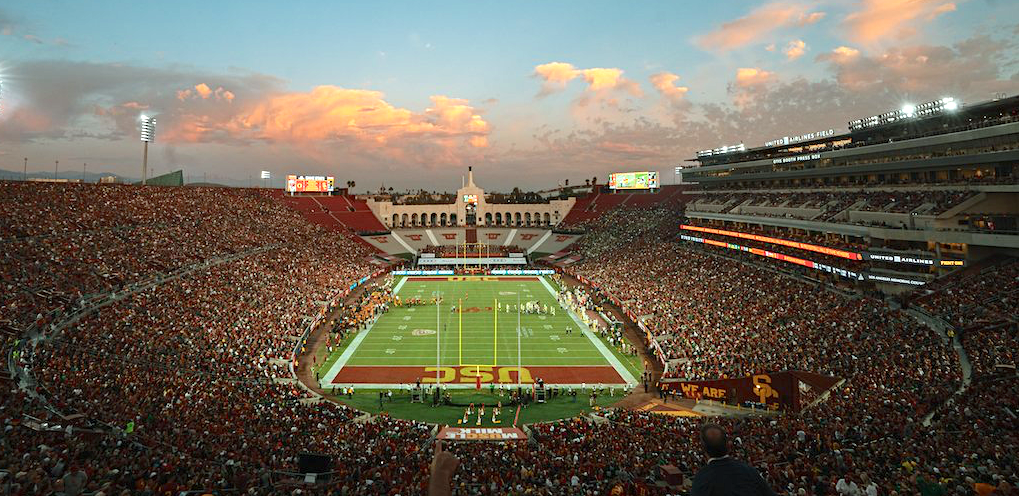
The Los Angeles Memorial Coliseum during a USC football game.

In men's sports, USC has won 97 team national championships (84 NCAA titles) – more than any other school – and male athletes have won a record 303 individual NCAA titles. The Trojans have won 26 championships in track and field, 21 in tennis, 12 in baseball, 9 in swimming and diving, 9 in water polo, 6 in volleyball, 2 in indoor track and field, and 1 in gymnastics.^{[c]} USC's men's basketball has appeared in the NCAA tournament 15 times, and made 2 NCAA Final Four appearances.

The USC football program has historically ranked among the best in Division I FBS. The Trojans football team has won 11 national championships. Eight players have won the Heisman Trophy. As of 2021, 537 Trojans have been taken in the NFL draft, making it the school with the most NFL draft picks.

=== Women's sports ===
Women's teams have earned 27 national championships. The Women of Troy have brought home 64 individual NCAA crowns. Two women athletes have won the Honda-Broderick Cup as the top collegiate woman athlete of the year: Cheryl Miller (1983–84) and Angela Williams (2001–02). Trojan women have won 8 Honda Awards, as the top female athlete in their sport. The Women of Troy have won 7 championships in tennis, 6 in volleyball, 4 in water polo, 3 in golf, 2 in basketball, 2 in beach volleyball, 1 in swimming and diving, 2 in track and field and 2 in soccer.

== Traditions and student activities ==
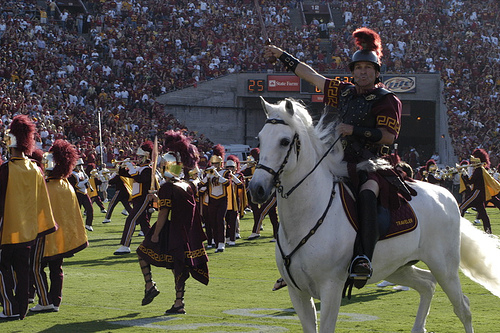
USC mascot Traveler with Trojan Warrior and the Spirit of Troy

As one of the oldest universities in California, the University of Southern California has a number of traditions. USC's official fight song is "Fight On", which was composed in 1922 by USC dental student Milo Sweet with lyrics by Sweet and Glen Grant.

=== Rivalries ===
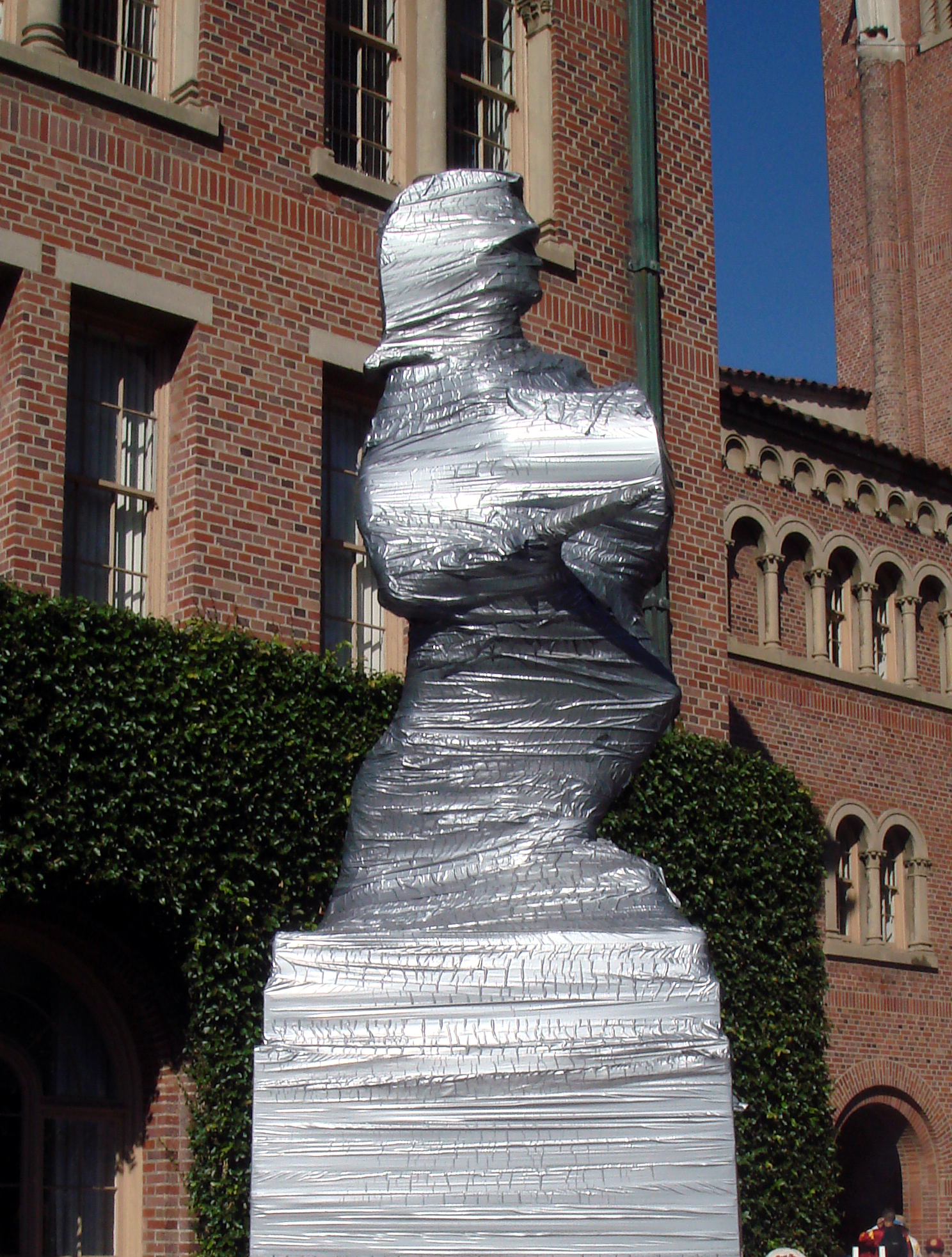
During the week prior to the traditional USC-UCLA rivalry football game, the Tommy Trojan statue is covered to prevent UCLA vandalism.

USC has rivalries with multiple schools. Although generally limited to football, USC has a major rivalry with Notre Dame. The annual game is played for the Jeweled Shillelagh. The rivalry has featured more national championship teams, Heisman trophy winners, All-Americans, and future NFL hall-of-famers than any other collegiate match-up. The two schools have kept the annual game on their schedules since 1926 (except 1942–44 because of World War II travel restrictions and 2020 because of the COVID-19 Pandemic) and the game is often referred to as the greatest intersectional rivalry in college football.

USC's most famous rival is UCLA with whom there is fierce athletic and scholastic competition. Both universities are in Los Angeles and approximately 10 miles (16 km) apart. Both schools were members of the Pac-12 Conference for nearly a century until leaving for the Big Ten in 2024. Until 1982, the two schools also shared the same football stadium, the Los Angeles Memorial Coliseum. The victor of the annual football game takes home the Victory Bell. The Trojans and Bruins also compete in a year-long all-sports competition for the Lexus Gauntlet Trophy. Pranks between UCLA and USC were commonplace several decades ago. Both universities have cracked down on pranks since a 1989 incident when USC students released hundreds of crickets into the main UCLA library during finals week. Days before a clash between rivals UCLA and USC in 2009, the Bruins mascot was vandalized. It was splashed in cardinal and gold paint, USC's official colors, sparking memories of pranks played in the years earlier. The week preceding the annual football matchup with UCLA is known as "Troy Week" and features a number of traditions including "The Ultimate Trojan Experience", Save Tommy Night, the CONQUEST! Bonfire, and all-night vigils by the USC Helenes and Trojan Knights to protect the campus from UCLA Bruins.

In addition, USC has rivalries with other former Pac-12 schools, particularly the Stanford Cardinal as they were the only two private universities in the Pac-12 Conference and are situated at opposing regions of California, as well as being the two oldest private research universities in California, 1880 and 1891, respectively. Recently, a rivalry has begun to exist between USC and the University of Oregon because of the two universities' dominant football programs with each school often serving as the toughest match-up on the opponent's schedule.

=== Mascots ===
Traveler, a white Andalusian horse, is the university's official mascot. Traveler I first appeared at a football game in 1961 ridden by Richard Saukko. The current horse is known as Traveler IX. Tommy Trojan, officially known as the Trojan Shrine, is a bronze statue in the model of a Trojan warrior at the center of campus. It is commonly mistaken as the school's official mascot. The statue was modeled after Trojan football players and is engraved with the ideal characteristics of a Trojan. It is a popular meeting point for students and a landmark for visitors. In the 1940s, George Tirebiter, a car-chasing dog, was the most popular unofficial mascot. It gained fame among students after it bit the mascot of the UCLA Bruins. The dog was kept by the Trojan Knights and was known to chase down cars on Trousdale Parkway, which runs through campus. After the original dog died, three others succeeded it. A statue was built in 2006 to honor the unofficial mascot.

=== Marching band ===
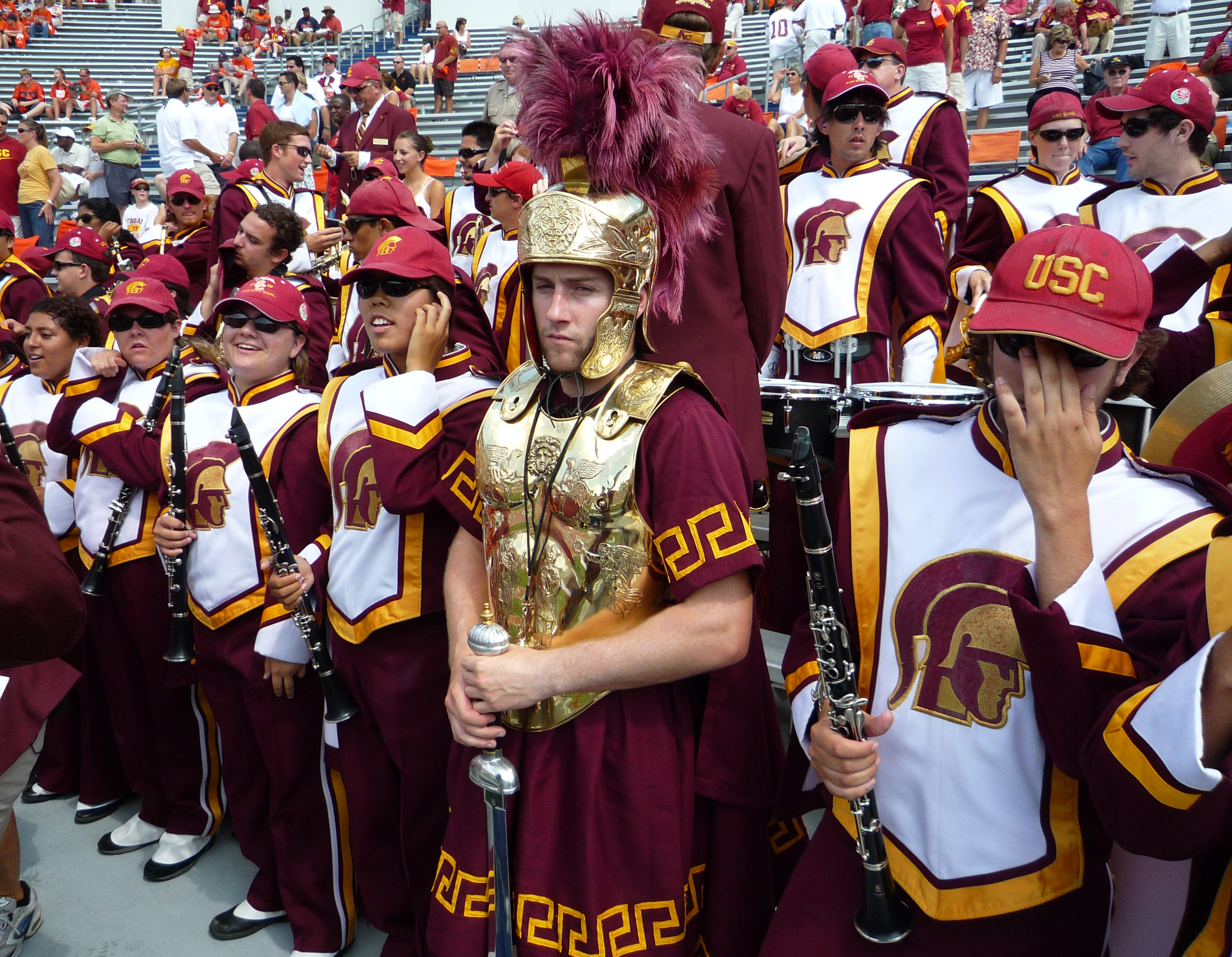
The drum major of the Spirit of Troy wears a more elaborate uniform and conducts the band with a sword.

The Spirit of Troy is USC's marching band and has been featured in at least ten major movies and performed in both the 1932 and 1984 Summer Olympics in Los Angeles. They have also performed on television shows and with other musicians. The band performed on the title track of the 1979 Fleetwood Mac album Tusk, which went on to be a multi-platinum record. The band performed during halftime at Super Bowl XXI in 1987 and Super Bowl XXII in 1988. In 1990, the band performed live on America's Funniest Home Videos. Additionally, the band later played on another multi-platinum Fleetwood Mac album, The Dance (1997). The Spirit of Troy is the only collegiate band to have two platinum records.

In recent years, the band has appeared at the 2009 Grammy Awards, accompanying Radiohead; on the 2009 Academy Awards with Beyoncé and Hugh Jackman; and during the finale of American Idol 2008, backing Renaldo Lapuz in instrumentation of his original song, "We're Brothers Forever". In 2009, the band played on the show Dancing with the Stars. The USC band was only one of two American groups invited to march in the Hong Kong Chinese New Year parade in 2003 and 2004. The Trojan Marching Band performed at the 2005 World Expo in Nagoya, Japan. In May 2006, the Trojan Marching Band traveled to Italy, performing once in Florence, and twice in Rome (including in front of the Coliseum). The band has also, for many years, performed the 1812 Overture with the Los Angeles Philharmonic Orchestra (or occasionally with other orchestras) each year at the Hollywood Bowl "Tchaikovsky Spectacular."

=== Spirit groups ===
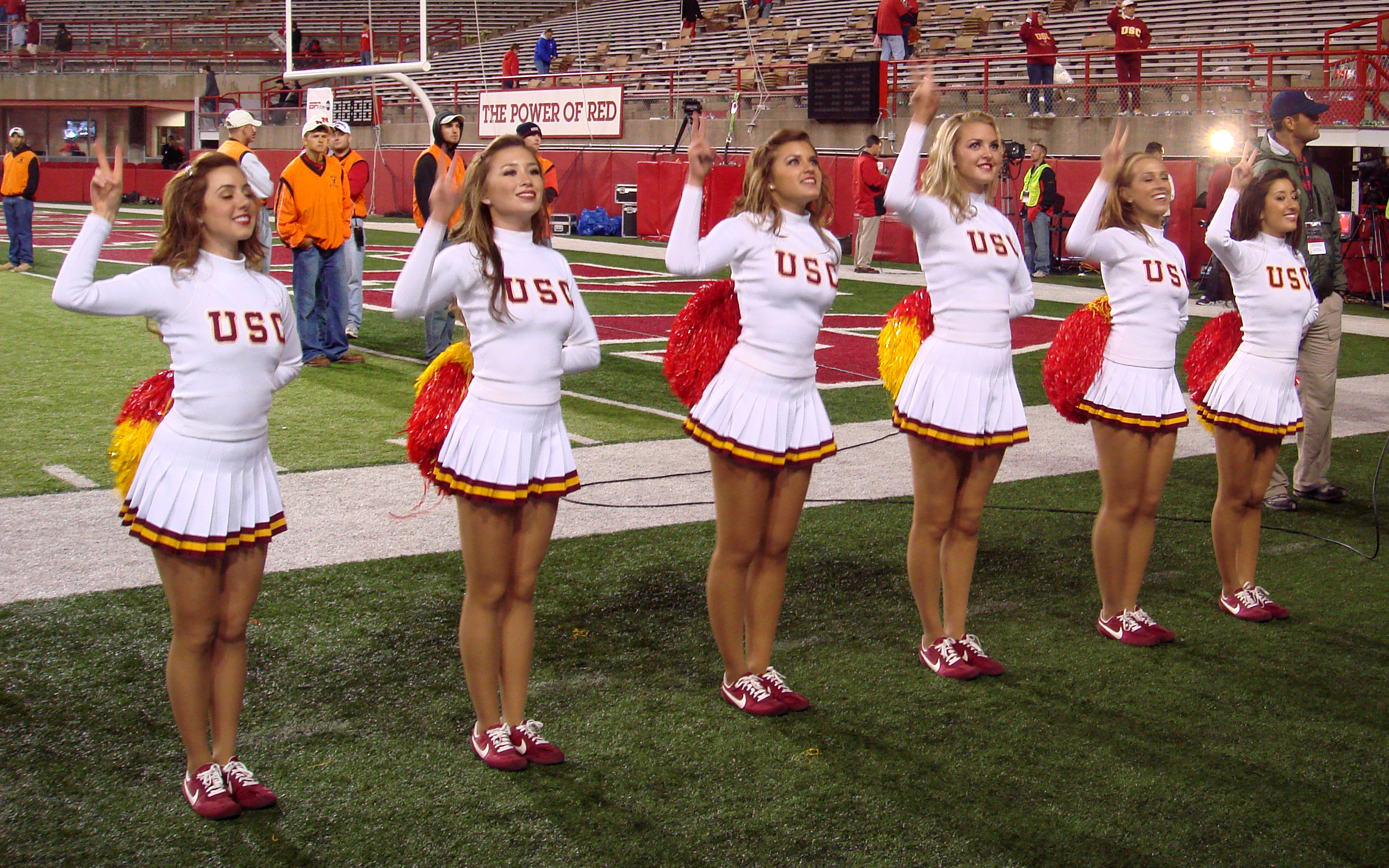
The Song Girls celebrating a USC Trojans football victory

==== Song Girls ====
Founded in 1967, the USC Song Girls appear at football, basketball, and volleyball games as well as other sporting events, rallies, and university and alumni functions. The squad also performs internationally. The squad has traveled to Italy, Austria, France, Hungary, Czech Republic, Japan, China and Australia, most recently having traveled to Milan, Italy to perform at the 2015 World Expo on America's Independence Day. Unlike other college cheer teams, Song Girls are primarily a dance squad and do not perform gymnastics, stunts, or lead cheers. The Song Girls perform to the music of and often appear with The Spirit of Troy. Together with the Trojan Marching Band, they are a visible public face of the university and function as the ambassadors of spirit and goodwill for the Trojan Family.

==== Yell Leaders ====
Lindley Bothwell founded the USC Yell Leading Squad in 1919 in his first year as a student at USC. He felt that together, with a few friends, he could aid in "firing up" the crowd during football games. The USC Yell Leaders worked closely with The Spirit of Troy and the Song Girls to lead cheers and perform stunts to rally Trojan fans at football, basketball, and volleyball games. The sweater-clad team consisted of all men for most of its existence, though the squad later opened itself up to applicants from both sexes and did feature one female Yell Leader in 1998. They were disbanded by the university after the 2005–06 season and replaced by the co-ed Spirit Leaders.

==== Spirit Leaders ====
The USC Spirit Leaders are responsible for leading stadium wide chants and increasing crowd participation at all Trojan athletic events, including football and basketball games.

=== Student media ===
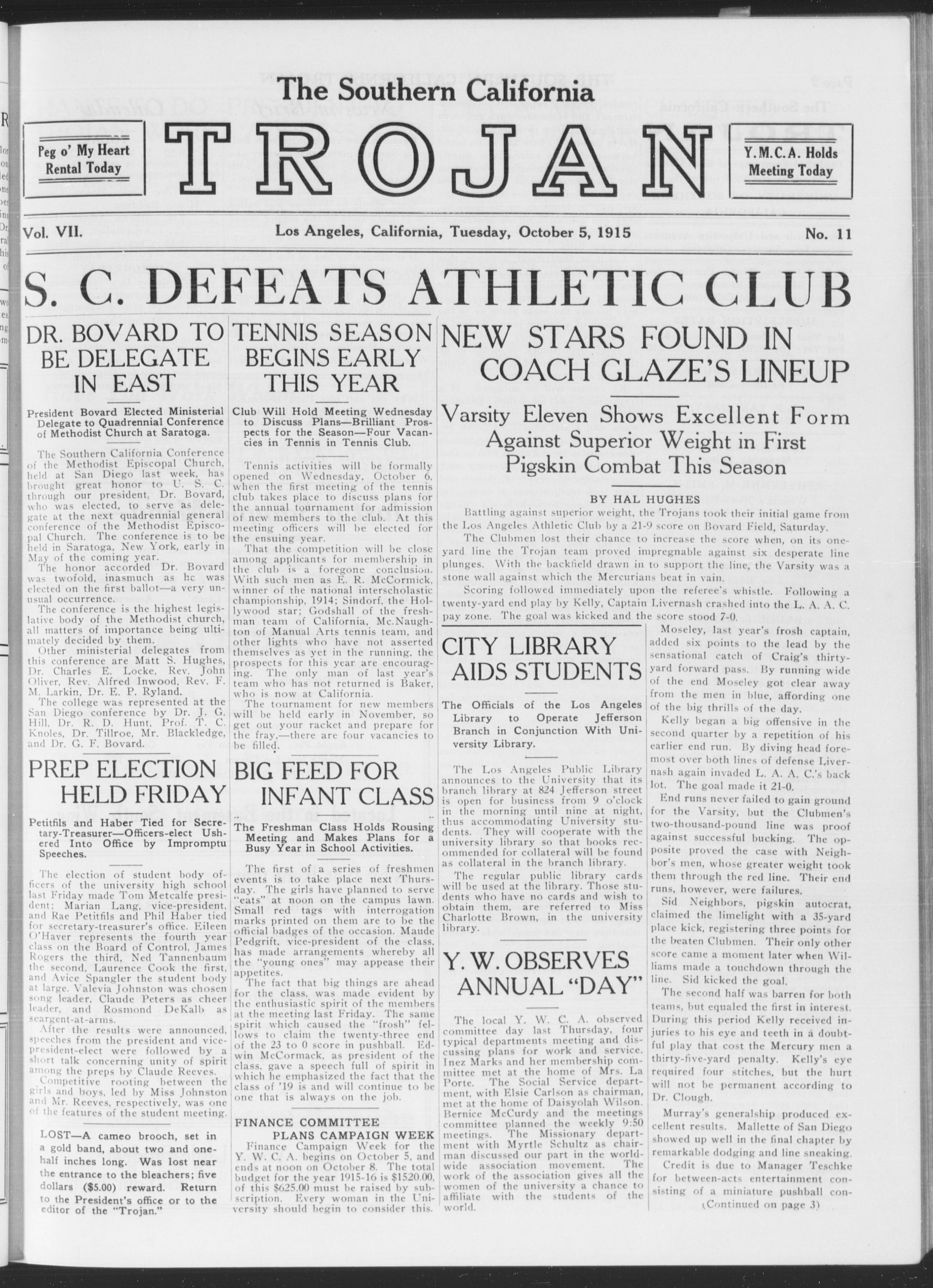
A The Southern California Trojan issued in 1915

The Daily Trojan has been the student newspaper of USC since 1912 and is a primary source of news and information for the campus. It secured the first interview of President Richard Nixon after his resignation. The publication does not receive financial aid from the university and instead runs entirely on advertisement revenue. Published from Monday to Friday during the fall and spring semesters, the newspaper turns into the Summer Trojan during the summer term and publishes once a week. It is the paper of record on campus.

KXSC (FM) is a University of Southern California-owned, public radio station based in Sunnyvale, California, serving the San Francisco Bay Area. KXSC-AM, previously known as KSCR, is the university's student-run station, which is managed entirely by an unpaid staff of nearly 200 undergraduate and graduate volunteers. The station gives students hands-on experience in a variety of music industry and broadcast-related positions, including live event promotion, social media management, radio production, and audio engineering. Besides providing nearly 24 hours of daily live programming, the station also hosts live events, bringing local and touring bands to campus. The station's annual KXSC Fest, which began in 2009, has played host to performers such as Nosaj Thing, Muna (band), Mika Miko, Dan Deacon, Thee Oh Sees, and Flying Lotus.

KXSC traces its roots to the original KUSC, which was operated by students starting in 1946. When KUSC transitioned to classical programming and moved off-campus in the mid-1970s, a group of students interested in having a student-run radio station founded KSCR in 1975. KSCR was broadcast at 1560AM out of a student in the Hancock Foundation Building. In 1984, the university authorized a grant to move KSCR to a new location in Marks Hall. In 2010, KSCR adopted the call letters KXSC in order to be eligible to obtain a new FM license from the FCC, as well as to mark the station's move to a brand-new facility in the basement of the Ronald Tutor Campus Center.

Trojan Vision (often abbreviated as TV8) is the student television station at USC. TV8 was established in 1997 by the Annenberg School for Communication, but it is now a part of the School of Cinematic Arts. Trojan Vision broadcasts 24/7 from the Robert Zemeckis Center for Digital Arts to the University Park Campus on Channel 8.1 and online through their website. Programming is also made available to the greater Los Angeles community on local channel LA36. In addition to a selection of regularly airing shows of many genres, Trojan Vision also broadcasts the shows Platforum, a round-table debate show; Annenberg TV News, a news program; and CU@USC, an interview program.

El Rodeo is USC's student-run yearbook. One of the oldest student traditions at the university, the yearbook's first edition was released in 1889 and was originally called The Sybil. The name was changed to El Rodeo in 1899 to reflect the cowboy-themed events students threw to advertise the yearbook as a "roundup" of the year's events. It was long packaged with the Student Activity Card, which gave students access to all home sports games. Since the card was dissolved in 2007, the yearbook has been sold as a stand-alone item.

=== Fraternities and sororities ===
Fraternities and sororities have had a long history on the campus. Centered on a portion of West 28th Street known as "The Row", between Figueroa Street and Hoover Street just north of campus, USC's Greek system began soon after the school's founding when Kappa Alpha Theta founded a chapter in 1887. Today, the university sponsors four fraternities and ten sororities in the Interfraternity Conference (IFC) and Panhellenic Conference (PHC), respectively. In 2022, eleven fraternities disaffiliated from the university to form the University Park Interfraternity Council (UPIFC).

Outside the Panhellenic and Interfraternity conferences, the Greek community at USC is very diverse, boasting the Multicultural, Asian, Inter-Fraternity (composed of professional fraternities), and the National Pan-Hellenic (historically Black) Councils. Organizations governed by these councils include chapters of some of the oldest Latino and Black Greek organizations in the country, while also including established professional business, engineering, and pre-law fraternities, and other multiculturally based groups.

== Controversies ==
=== Title IX violations ===
In the mid-2010s, USC was embroiled in numerous controversies and scandals. On May 1, 2014, USC was named as one of many higher-education institutions under investigation by the Office of Civil Rights for potential Title IX violations by Barack Obama's White House Task Force to Protect Students from Sexual Assault. USC is also under a concurrent Title IX investigation for potential anti-male bias in disciplinary proceedings, as well as denial of counseling resources to male students. In 2018, USC was ordered to pay $111,965 in legal fees to a male student accused of rape after the Title IX investigation run by Gretchen Means Gaspari was deemed unfair. In 2020, USC was penalized for its faulty Title IX processes by the U.S. Department of Education's Office for Civil Rights.

=== George Tyndall ===
The following year, the Los Angeles Times broke another story about USC focusing on George Tyndall, a gynecologist accused of abusing 52 patients at USC. The reports span from 1990 to 2016, and include using racist and sexual language, conducting exams without gloves, and taking pictures of his patients' genitals. Inside Higher Ed later reported that the university's president, C. L. Max Nikias, was resigning, noting that "other incidents in which the university is perceived to have failed to act on misconduct by powerful officials" had occurred. Tyndall was fired in 2017 after reaching a settlement with the university. By June 1, 2018, 401 people had contacted a special hotline to receive complaints about the doctor. On October 18, nearly 100 women were reported to have filed new lawsuits against the university, bringing the number of accusations up to over 500 current and former students. A series of settlements to the victims totalled to over $1.1 billion, the largest sexual abuse settlement of any university.

=== Keck School of Medicine ===
In 2016, Carmen Puliafito resigned as dean of the Keck School of Medicine. In 2017, the Los Angeles Times revealed that Puliafito had engaged in parties with young recreational drug users and prostitutes, including at the Keck School's offices, with harm to at least one user. His resignation had occurred shortly after a police investigation of those activities. In 2018, Dennis Kelly resigned as men's health physician at USC after almost twenty years. The following year, he was accused by six male graduate students of inappropriate conduct. By 2020, 49 accusations of misconduct had been made against Kelly, all by gay or bisexual students and former students.

=== Implication in Varsity Blues scandal ===
USC was one of several universities involved in the 2019 college admissions bribery scandal. On March 12, 2019, three coaches and one athletic director were charged with accepting bribes from wealthy families for fraudulently facilitating their children's admission to USC. Among the twelve university personnel charged for their involvement in the scandal nationwide, four were associated with USC. Following its involvement in the admissions scandal, the university was derided by its old nickname: the "University of Spoiled Children", a nickname it had previously worked hard to shed.

=== Preferential treatment of Qatari royal ===
A 2020 investigative report by the Los Angeles Times revealed that USC granted a bachelor's and master's degree to Khalifa bin Hamad bin Khalifa Al Thani, a Qatari royal, while allowing him to avoid rules and procedures that apply to other students. He was accepted to USC as a transfer student from Los Angeles Mission College after his mother, Moza bint Nasser, met USC president Max Nikias in 2012 in Los Angeles, California, at the behest of USC trustee Tom Barrack. An adjunct professor said that Al Thani's handlers delivered a final paper in a bag that also contained a Rolex watch, which the adjunct returned.

=== Rankings data ===
In December 2022, three former students in an online graduate program offered by the Rossier School of Education and administered by educational technology company 2U filed a class action lawsuit for the school's filing faulty data with U.S. News & World Report in an effort to boost rankings. Rossier removed itself from the rankings in early 2022.

=== 2024 student protests regarding the Gaza War ===
In April 2024, the USC administration under President Carol Folt was met with widespread criticism following the decision to restrict valedictorian Asna Tabassum from speaking during that year's commencement ceremony. USC cited safety concerns stemming from Tabassum's pro-Palestinian viewpoints. Following several on-campus protests, statements from dozens of human rights organizations and national coverage, USC further restricted all external speakers from speaking at that year's main commencement.

The following week, USC became embroiled in additional controversy following a pro-Palestinian protest against the Gaza war, beginning at 4:30 A.M. on April 24, 2024, which took place in Alumni Park, a central plaza of campus. The student organizers wrote in a release that, among other demands, the campus occupation would not end until it saw financial transparency of USC's endowments and investments, an academic boycott of Israel, and protection of free speech. After involved students refused to disperse despite intervention from campus police, the university brought the Los Angeles Police Department in to remove protestors. The situation escalated to involve the complete closure of all campus facilities, the campus itself, and the arrests of 93 protestors.

On April 25, 2024, Folt announced that the main stage commencement ceremony in May would not take place. The actions of USC's administration towards student protestors further prompted the withdrawal of two high-profile speakers scheduled to address the USC Rossier School of Education, which was announced in an open letter to the administration on the website Literary Hub, as well as to USC officials.

In February 2025, Leo Terrell, the head of the Trump administration's Task Force to Combat Antisemitism, announced that he would investigate USC as part of the Department of Justice's broader investigation into antisemitism on college campuses.

== Notable people ==
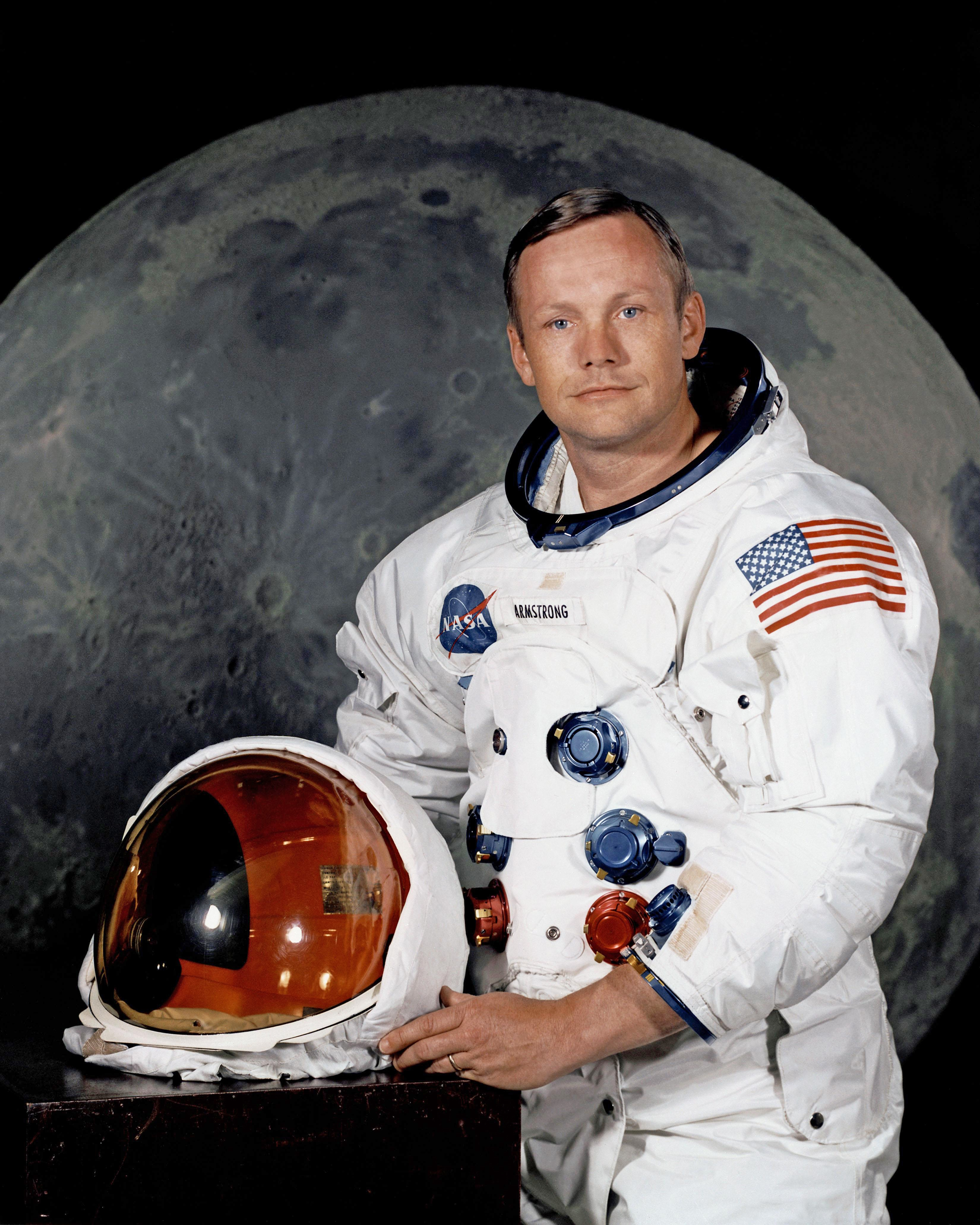
Neil Armstrong completed his Master of Science degree in aerospace engineering at USC in 1970.

USC has graduated more alumni who have gone on to win Academy and Emmy Awards than any other institution, largely due to the School of Cinematic Arts, and has conferred degrees upon 29 living billionaires. USC has had 5 Nobel Laureates on staff and its affiliates include 11 Rhodes Scholars, 12 Marshall Scholars, 6 MacArthur Fellows, 181 Fulbright Scholars, and 1 Turing Award winner.

Notable alumni also include Neil Armstrong, the first person to walk on the Moon; Zulfiqar Ali Bhutto, former President and Prime Minister of Pakistan; Charles Bolden, the former director of NASA and a former astronaut; O. J. Simpson, American football player, actor, and accused murderer; Kenneth J. Szalai, former NASA Dryden director; Byron Allen, founder, chairman and CEO of Allen Media Group; Lillian Copeland, Olympic champion in the discus throw; George Lucas, creator of Star Wars and Indiana Jones; Andrew Viterbi, co-founder of Qualcomm and inventor of the Viterbi algorithm; Academy Award winner John Wayne; Dexter Holland, co-founder, lead singer and guitarist of The Offspring, actor and comedian Will Ferrell; Emmy Award-winning actor John Ritter; Pritzker Prize-winning architect Frank Gehry; Hall of Fame football player Ron Mix; longtime Los Angeles Lakers owners Jerry Buss, as well as his daughter and current Lakers owner Jeanie; recycling symbol designer Gary Anderson; entertainer Larry Harmon, better known as his alter ego, Bozo the Clown; former U.S. Secretary of State Warren Christopher; deposed Egyptian president Mohamed Morsi; actress America Ferrera; journalist Julie Chen Moonves; the late MythBusters host Grant Imahara; former prime minister of Jordan Fayez Tarawneh; Taiwanese actress and singer Michelle Chen; American influencer Jake Shane; Hwang Dong-hyuk, South Korean director of Netflix's most watched TV show, Squid Game; and Marc Benioff, CEO and co-founder of Salesforce.

== In media ==
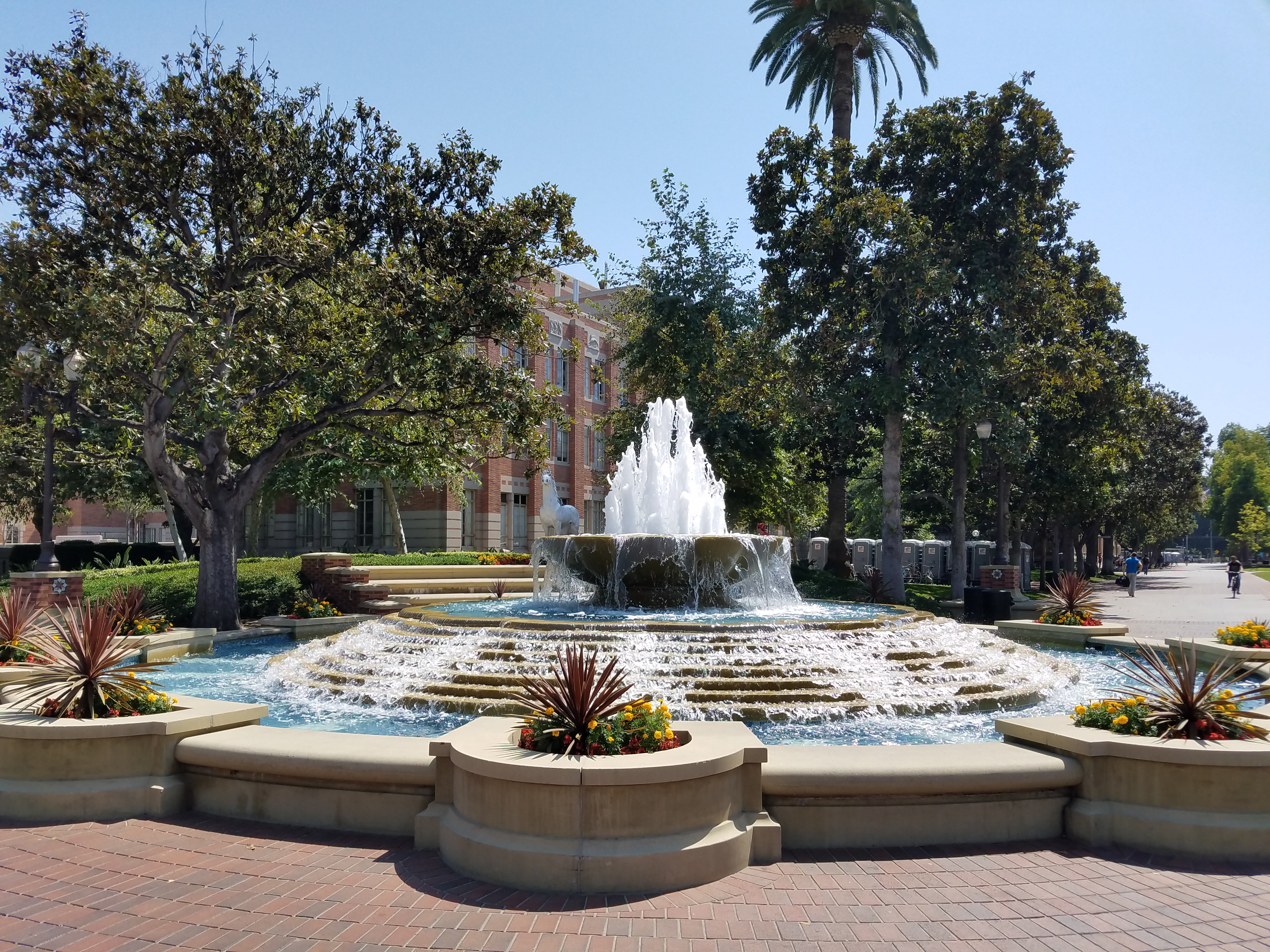
Fountain at central campus crossroads, Childs Way at Trousdale Parkway, with Allan Hancock Foundation building (1941) in background.

Because of USC's proximity to Hollywood, close ties between the School of Cinematic Arts and entertainment industry, and the architecture on campus, the university has been used in numerous movies, television series, commercials, and music videos. USC is frequently used by filmmakers, standing in for numerous other universities. According to IMDb, USC's campus has been featured in at least 180 film and television titles.

Movies filmed at USC include Forrest Gump, Legally Blonde, Road Trip, The Girl Next Door, Harold & Kumar Go to White Castle, Love & Basketball, Blue Chips, Ghostbusters, Live Free or Die Hard, House Party 2, The Number 23, The Social Network and The Graduate. Television series that have used the USC campus include Brooklyn Nine-Nine, How to Get Away With Murder, Cold Case, Entourage, 24, The O.C., Beverly Hills, 90210, Moesha, Saved by the Bell: The College Years, The Fresh Prince of Bel-Air, House M.D., CSI: NY, Undeclared, The West Wing, Alias, The Office, Monk, The United States of Tara, Gilmore Girls, Scrubs, and The Roommate.

== See also ==
- Rock Theatre

== Notes ==
a. The alternative name "Southern Cal" frequently appears in sports-related news articles to distinguish it from the University of South Carolina, which also uses the "USC" acronym. USC discourages use of "Southern Cal" out of concern the name might suggest a foundational association to the University of California, Berkeley (commonly known as "Cal" in the athletics context), even though the two institutions have no affiliation other than their longtime (but not current) Pac-12 membership and the fact that they are in the same state. For several years, USC's media guides contained the following request: "Note to the media: In editorial references to athletic teams of the University of Southern California, the following are preferred: USC, Southern California, So. California, Troy and Trojans for men's or women's teams, and Women of Troy for women's teams. The use of 'Southern Cal' on licensed apparel and merchandise is limited in scope and necessary to protect federal trademark rights."

b. Specifically Seoul, South Korea; Hong Kong, China; Jakarta, Indonesia; Taipei, Republic of China; Mexico City; and Tokyo, Japan. USC International Offices

c. The NCAA does not conduct a championship for Football Bowl Subdivision football.

d. The precise colors can be found on the USC Graphic Identity Program website: the correct Pantone color for USC Cardinal is PMS 201C and USC Gold is PMS 123C.
