= Zilkha Neurogenetic Institute =

Institute of the University of Southern California

Coordinates: 34.062439°N 118.203639°W

The Zilkha Neurogenetic Institute on the University of Southern California campus is a neurological and psychiatric diseases research facility. It is an organized research unit of the Keck School of Medicine of USC.

== History ==
=== Founding (1999-2003) ===
The institute is partially funded from the 1999 naming gift of $110 million, given by the W. M. Keck Foundation to the then-USC School of Medicine; the gift designated $22 million to build the new Zilkha Neurogenetic Institute facility on the Health Sciences Campus. The National Institutes of Health also awarded two million dollar construction grants to the Keck School of Medicine. The Zilka Neurogenetic Institute was created in 2002 with an additional $20 million gift from benefactors Mary Hayley and her husband Selim Zilkha. Selim Zilkha, in 2002 was quoted saying about the institute that he had "started many businesses in my life, but my most important legacy is this institute."

Construction of the Institute began in the fall 2001, and it opened in January 2003. It opened in a six-story facility with 70,000 square feet of lab space.

=== Research and new directors (2012-2025) ===
Berislav Zlokovic became head of the institute in 2012. In 2015, researchers at the institute published the paper "Blood-Brain Barrier Breakdown in the Aging Human Hippocampus" in Neuron.

In the spring of 2024, The Los Angeles Times reported that Zlokovic, still the head of the Zilkha Neurogenetic Institute, had a paper retracted after whistleblowers questioned its validity to the National Institutes of Health. Clinical trials on a related drug were paused as well. Zlokovic initially retained his post at Zilkha, although USC launched an investigation into his work. Zlokovic was placed on leave from the institute in October 2024, with the reason unclarified by USC. Steve Kay was named acting director, with Kay taking over Zlokovic's laboratory.

== Research ==
At the institute, basic and clinical neuroscientists work together to understand and ultimately develop cures for a range of neurological and psychiatric disorders such as Alzheimer's disease, amyotrophic lateral sclerosis, anxiety disorders, bipolar disorders, depression, schizophrenia, etc.

== Facilities ==
It opened in 2003, in a six-story facility with 70,000 square feet of lab space. It now has 30 laboratories and several hundred researchers.
