= World Music Festival =

World Music Festival may refer to:

- World Music Festival Chicago
- Udaipur World Music Festival

== See also ==
- World music
