= Oasis Tea Zone =

Restaurant chain in the U.S. state of Washington

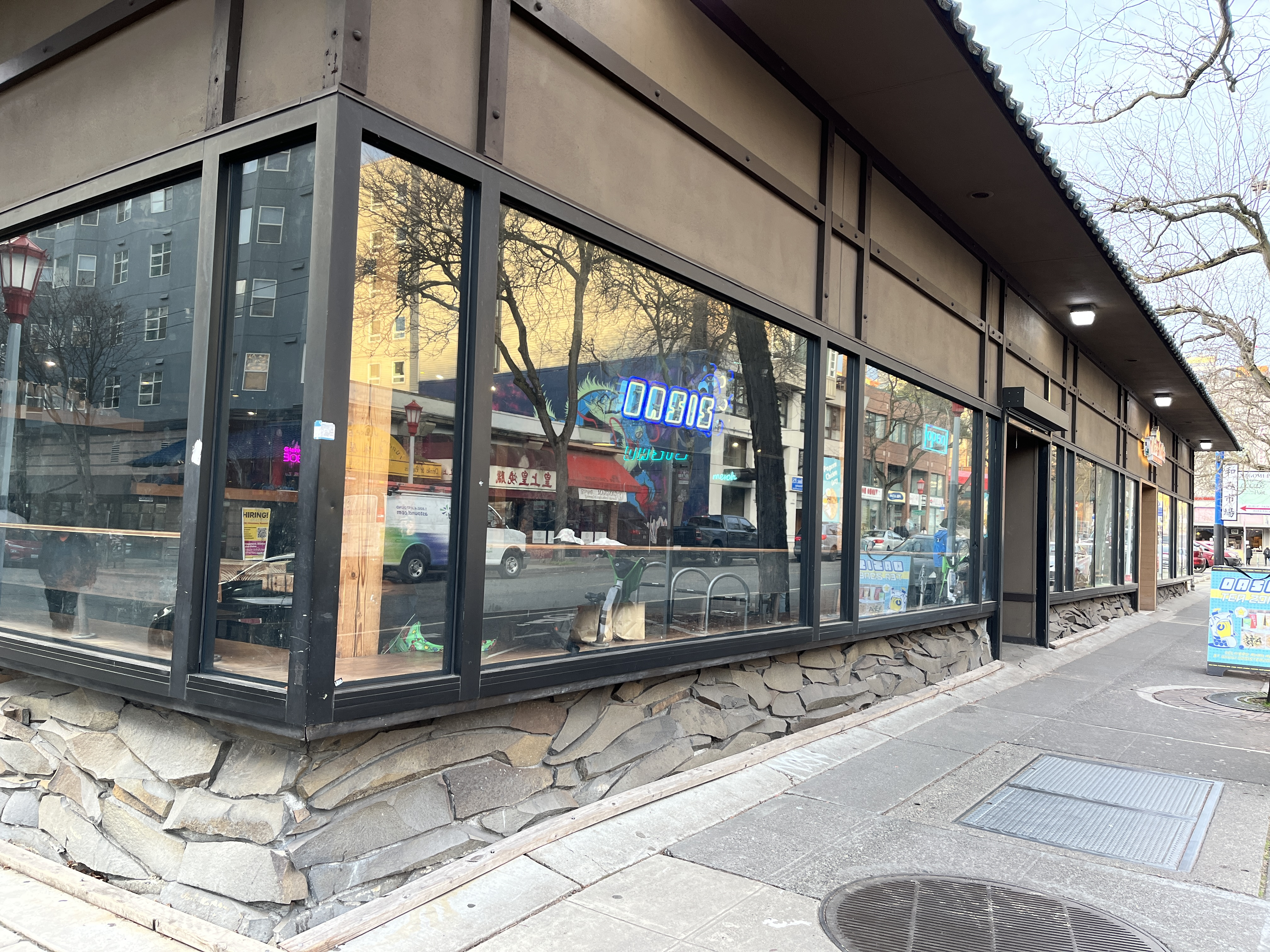
- Exterior of the cafe in Seattle's Chinatown–International District, 2023
- Interactive map of Oasis Tea Zone

Restaurant information
- Established: 2001
- Location: Washington, United States
- Coordinates: 47.5977°N 122.3265°W
- Website: oasisteazone.com

Oasis Tea Zone is a small chain of restaurants in the Seattle metropolitan area, in the U.S. state of Washington. The Liu family opened the original cafe in Seattle's Chinatown–International District in c. 2001. The business has expanded to three locations, as of 2022, operating in the University District and in Edmonds. It has garnered a positive reception and is considered one of Seattle's best boba shops.

== Description ==
Oasis Tea Zone is an Asian- and family-owned restaurant chain based in Seattle. There are three locations, as of 2022, including the original cafe in the Chinatown–International District (C–ID) and others in the University District and in downtown Edmonds. The C–ID location is within the district's eight-block core business area, and has arcade games, board games, and pinball.

The cafes have coffee, smoothies, and tea drinks, including bubble tea (also known as boba). Milk tea flavors have included chrysanthemum, honeydew, mango, and taro, and blended iced versions of the drink with and without creamer are called "snow" and "slush", respectively. Topping options include egg pudding and popping boba. Oasis Tea Zone serves lunch and dinner, with a food menu that has included popcorn chicken, Nutella wontons, and cherry chevre cake.

== History ==
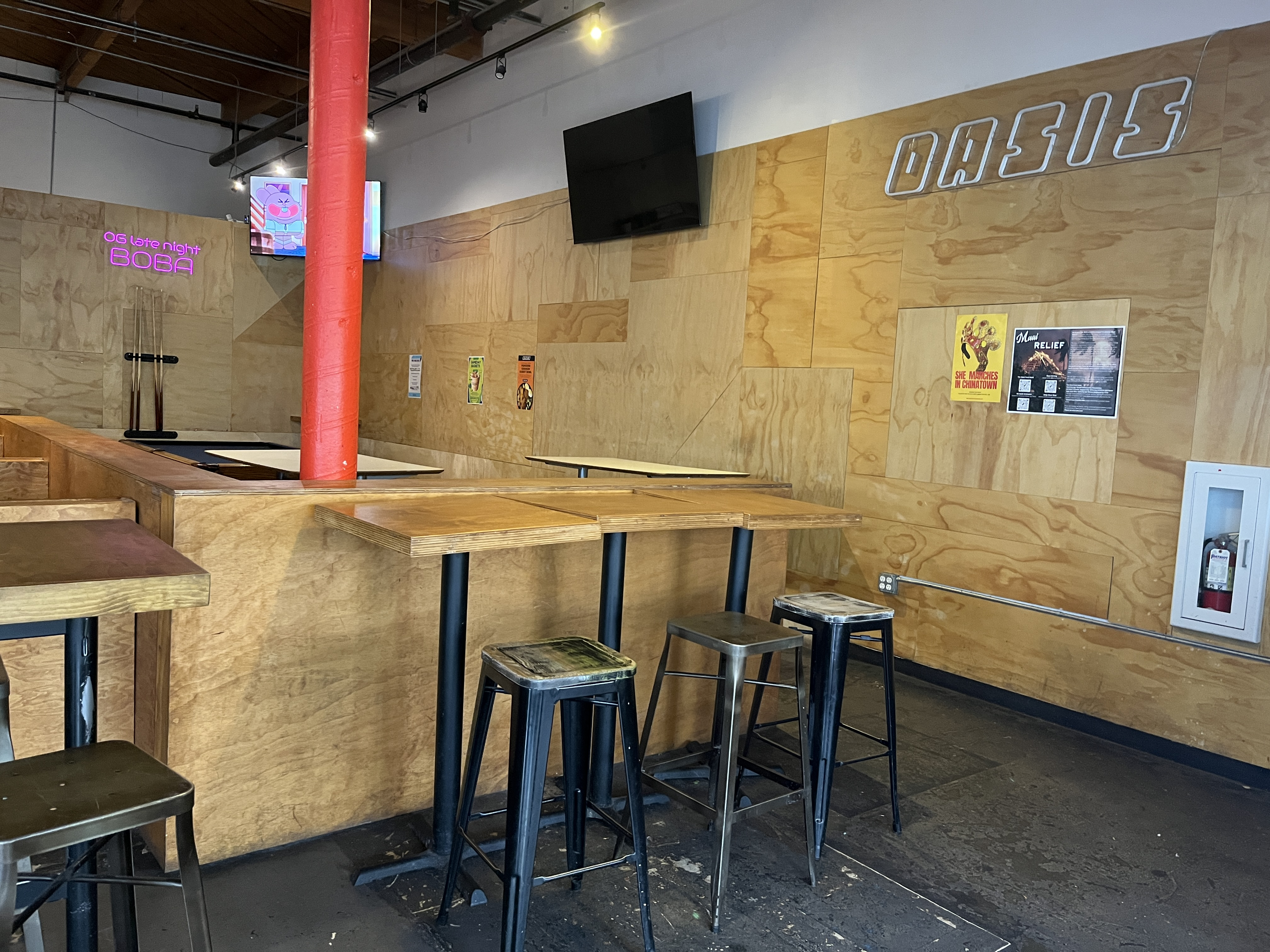
Interior of the Chinatown–International District cafe in 2023

The Liu family opened the original cafe in 2001, in a building that previously housed a Uwajimaya grocery store. Members of the family include I-Miun, who also owned Eastern Cafe, and his sister Jeannie. Northwest Asian Weekly has described I-Miun as "one of the youngest entrepreneurs in the community". According to the newspaper, it took a few years for Oasis Tea Zone to be a profitable business.

In 2014, the cafe partnered with the Chinatown/ID Business Improvement Area to sponsor a parklet with seating, tables, and planter boxes. The parklet was one of ten planned throughout the city at the time.

The Edmonds location opened in May 2022.

The University District location has been a participating vendor in the neighborhood's annual Street Fair. The cafe also participated in Seattle's first boba festival in 2022, offering mango lemonade with mango popping boba, and has been a vendor in the 'U District $4 Food Walk' event, offering hibiscus lemonade and mochi waffle.

Oasis Tea Zone has had work completed by local architect and design firm Board & Vellum. The chain's popular popcorn chicken was replicated at I-Miun Liu's cocktail bar Dynasty Room.

== Reception ==
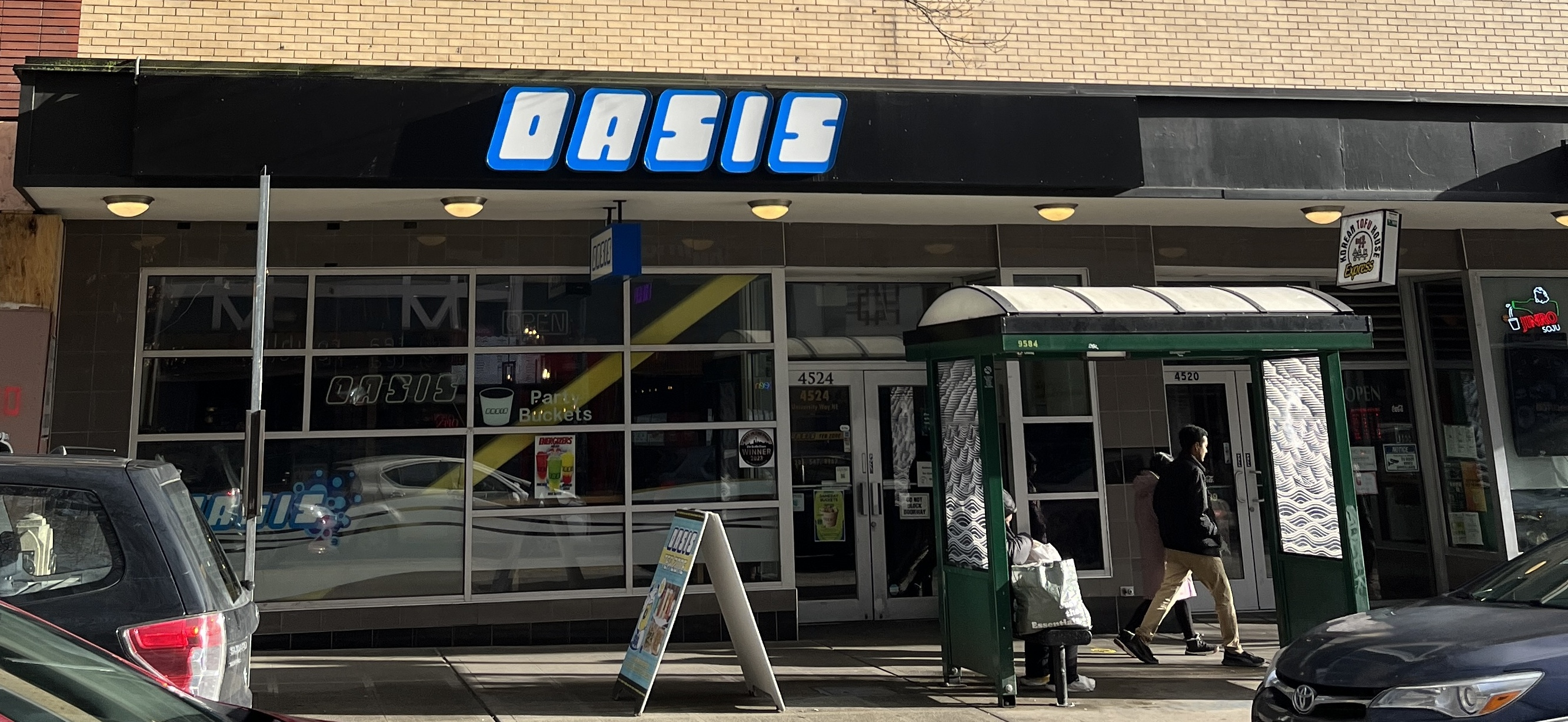
The shop in the University District, 2024

Oasis Tea Zone won in the Favorite Bubble Tea Café category of International Examiner's Reader's Choice Awards in 2013. It won in the same survey's Favorite Bubble Tea category in 2016. Ann Karneus included the business in Seattle Metropolitan's 2022 list of the city's sixteen best boba shops, and Lynn Schnaiberg of Seattle's Child magazine said the C–ID cafe is "usually busy" and had many flavor options in 2023. According to the University of Washington, the C–ID location has been called "the premiere late-night boba and tea cafe". Gillian McMahon of its student newspaper, The Daily, called Oasis Tea Zone a "classic Seattle spot" in 2022.

== See also ==
- List of restaurant chains in the United States
