= Uluh =

Chinese restaurant in Manhattan

- Interactive map of Uluh

Restaurant information
- Location: 152A 2nd Avenue, Manhattan, New York, United States
- Coordinates: 40.72945°N 73.9868°W
- Website: uluhny.com

Uluh is a Chinese restaurant and teahouse in Manhattan, New York. It is known for its selection of over thirty teas and over a hundred dishes spanning style and geographic origin across China. Eater named it one of the best Chinese restaurants in New York City.

== History ==
Uluh was opened in 2019 by restaurateurs Joanne Hong Bao and Richard Lam. Its name refers to the bottleneck gourd.

In October 2021, plans were announced to open a second Uluh location. In May 2023, Lam opened Uluhuluh Tea & Coffee, a window-operated storefront selling bubble tea and other beverages on East 14th Street. In April 2024, the rest of the building opened as Little Uluh, an Asian restaurant serving breakfast, lunch, and dinner.

== Critical reception ==
The Infatuation rated Little Uluh a 7.5 out of 10.
