= TP Tea =

Bubble tea shop chain based in Taichung, Taiwan

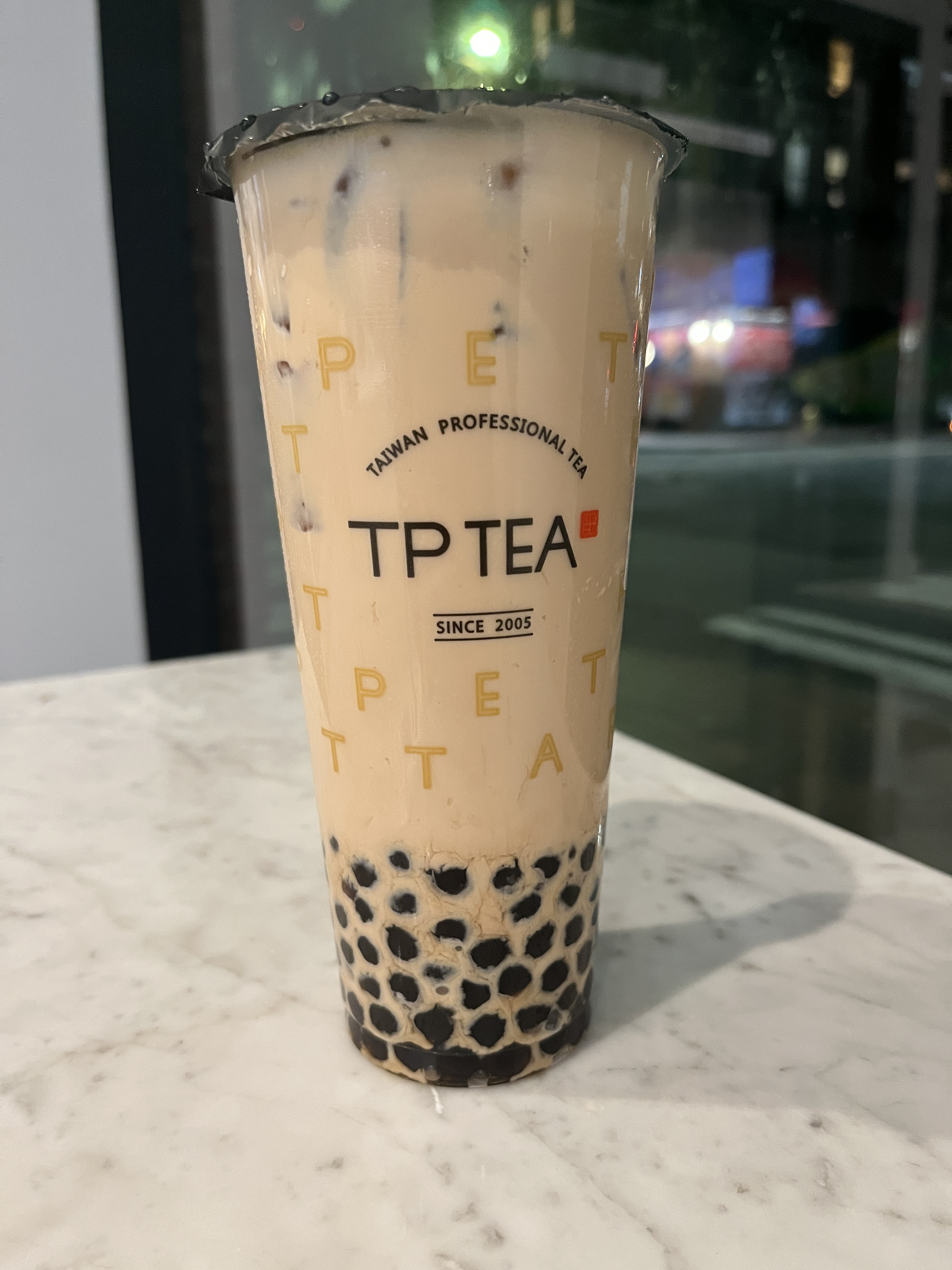
- Bubble tea at the TP Tea shop in Seattle
- Native name: 茶湯會
- Industry: Tea shop
- Founded: July 2005; 20 years ago
- Founder: Liu Han-chieh
- Headquarters: Taichung, Taiwan
- Area served: Taiwan, China, Japan, Hong Kong, Singapore, Vietnam, Thailand, United States, and Canada
- Products: Bubble tea
- Website: en.tp-tea.com

TP Tea (short for Taiwan Professional Tea, Chinese: 茶湯會; pinyin: Chátānghuì), formerly known as Tea Pa Tea, is a subsidiary of Chun Shui Tang, which is known for the inventor of Bubble milk tea. Similar to most bubble tea shops in Taiwan, TP Tea only sells bubble tea, though snacks are sold occasionally for a limited time.

== History ==
The chain was founded in 2005, and has since spread to China, Japan, Hong Kong, Singapore, Vietnam, Thailand, the United States, and Canada. The first TP Tea shop in Hong Kong was opened in 2016, which is located in Tin Hau. The brand began operating in Singapore in 2018. The first U.S. shop opened in Cupertino, California, in 2018. The business has also operated in Seattle's Chinatown–International District.

== Reception ==
Aleenah Ansari included the business in Eater Seattle's 2025 overview of the city's best bubble tea shops.
