= Happy Lemon =

Restaurant chain

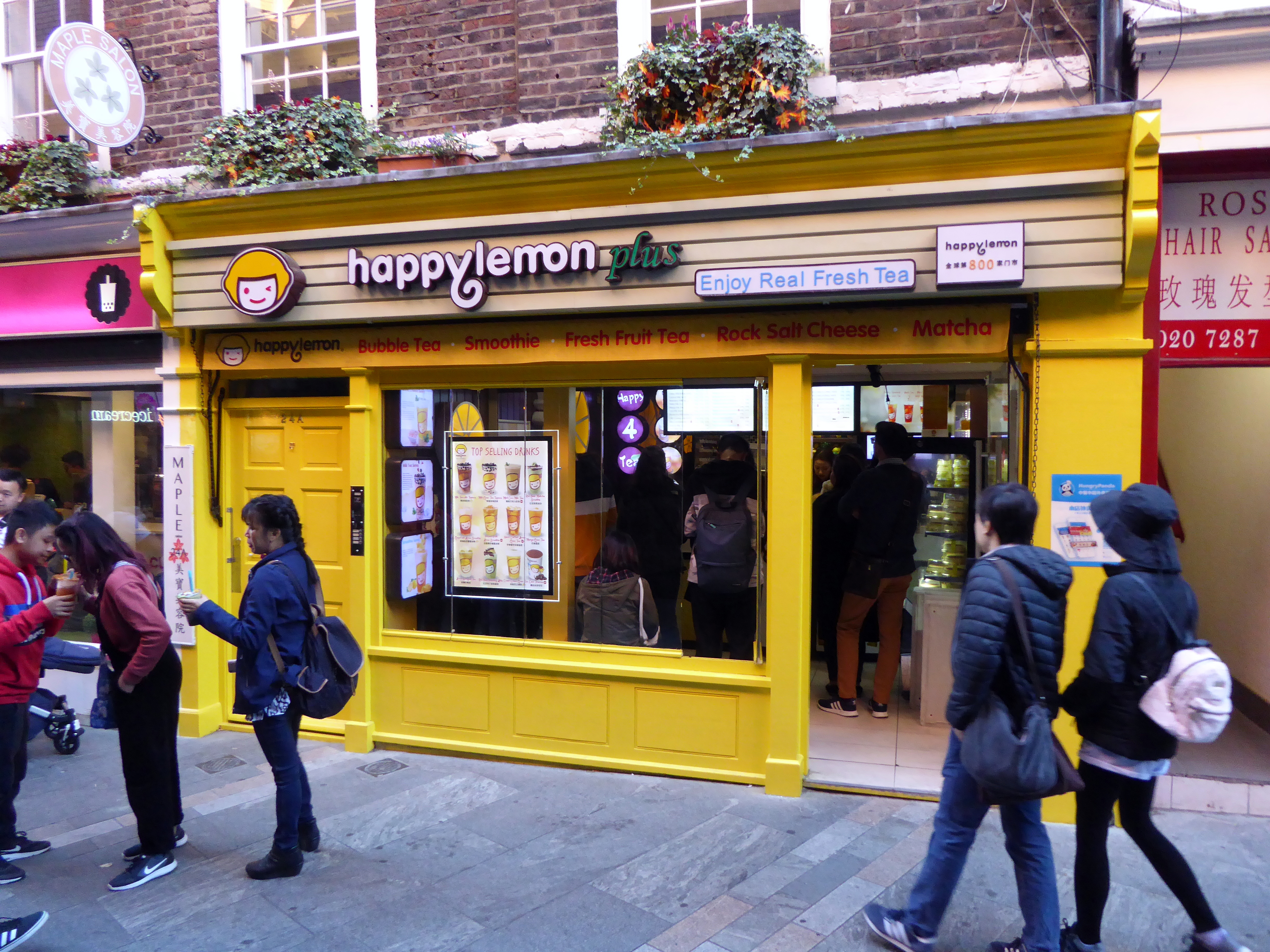
- Shop in Newport Court, Chinatown, London

Restaurant information
- Established: 2006

Happy Lemon is a Taiwan-based global franchise that consists of bubble tea shops.

== History ==
Happy Lemon originated in Taipei, Taiwan in 2006 by Albert Wu, the chairman of Yummy Town Holdings Corp, also known as the Yummy Town Group.

In 2013, the first location to open in the United States was located in New York. Approximately two years later in 2015, Happy Lemon opened their first location on the United States West Coast in Cupertino, California. In 2017 Happy Lemon opened a location in Vancouver, Canada. Their franchise appearance features three models: kiosk, take-out, and dine-in. In 2019 Happy Lemon teamed up with Alibaba-backed Koubei to employ a drink-making robot, capable of making roughly forty variations of the Happy Lemon menu, including drink type, flavor, ice, and sugar.

== Menu ==
The menu for each location varies. However, Happy Lemon is known for offering a variety of iced or cold blended beverages, including classic brewed tea, classic milk tea, fruit smoothies, fruit tea, lemon slushies, squeezed lemon tea, and salted cheese beverages. The salted cheese option is a cream cheese foam that sits atop the selected drink of choice, then sprinkled with rock salt.

Drinks are customizable with options to control ice and sugar ratios, or drink additions like fruit chunks. Some additional drink flavors include grapefruit, mango, strawberry, lemon, and matcha. Slushy options include jasmine, mango, dragon fruit, and Yakult, each mixed with lemon and blended with ice. Toppings can also vary between boba, puff cream, red bean, grass jelly, taro balls, or passion fruit seeds.

As for food and snacks, Happy Lemon offers a waffle called the Bubble Waffle. This item can be ordered with or without boba inside the bubble pockets. Each Bubble Waffle batter can be in one of the following flavors: plain, matcha, chocolate, red bean, or Oreo. It can also be ordered with a variety of dipping sauces, including puff cream. Various locations can offer additional items on their menu like chicken burgers, an item sold in Manchester, United Kingdom.

== Locations ==
Happy Lemon functions as a publicly owned franchise with locations in over twenty countries, including the United States, United Kingdom, Canada, China, Dubai, and more. As of 2026, there are approximately 2,000 Happy Lemon locations globally, including approximately 100 in the United States.

=== Canada ===
In Canada, Happy Lemon has operated in Toronto and Vancouver.

=== Japan ===
In Japan, Happy Lemon has operated in Tokyo in two locations.

=== United Kingdom ===
In the United Kingdom, Happy Lemon has operated in seven locations.

=== United States ===
In the United States, Happy Lemon has operated in the following cities:

- Athens, Georgia
- Austin, Texas
- Edmonds, Washington
- Evanston, Illinois
- Houston, Texas
- Kirkland, Washington
- Portland, Oregon
- Richardson, Texas
- Sacramento, California
- Seattle, Washington
- Silverdale, Washington
- Tukwila, Washington
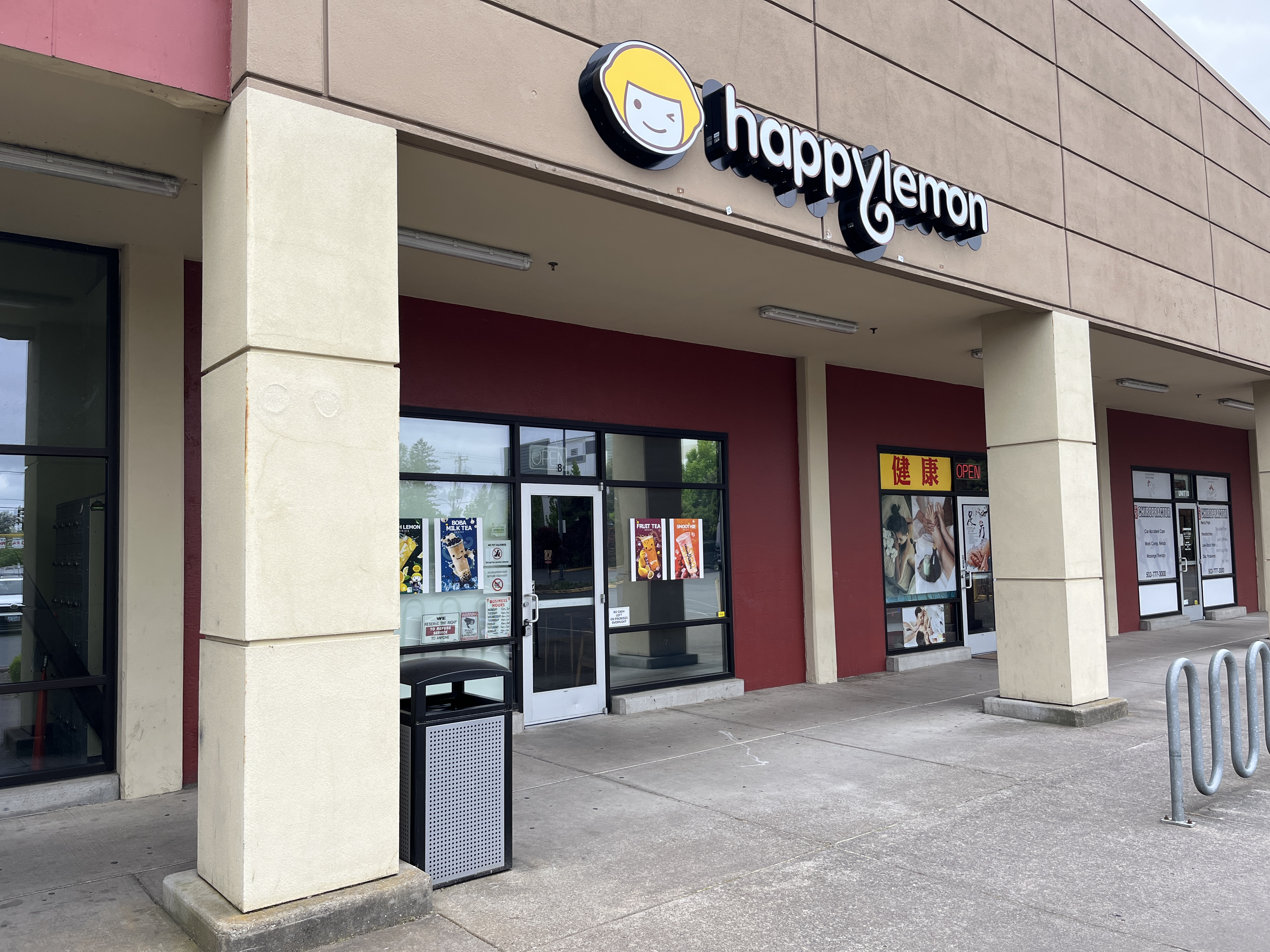
Portland, Oregon

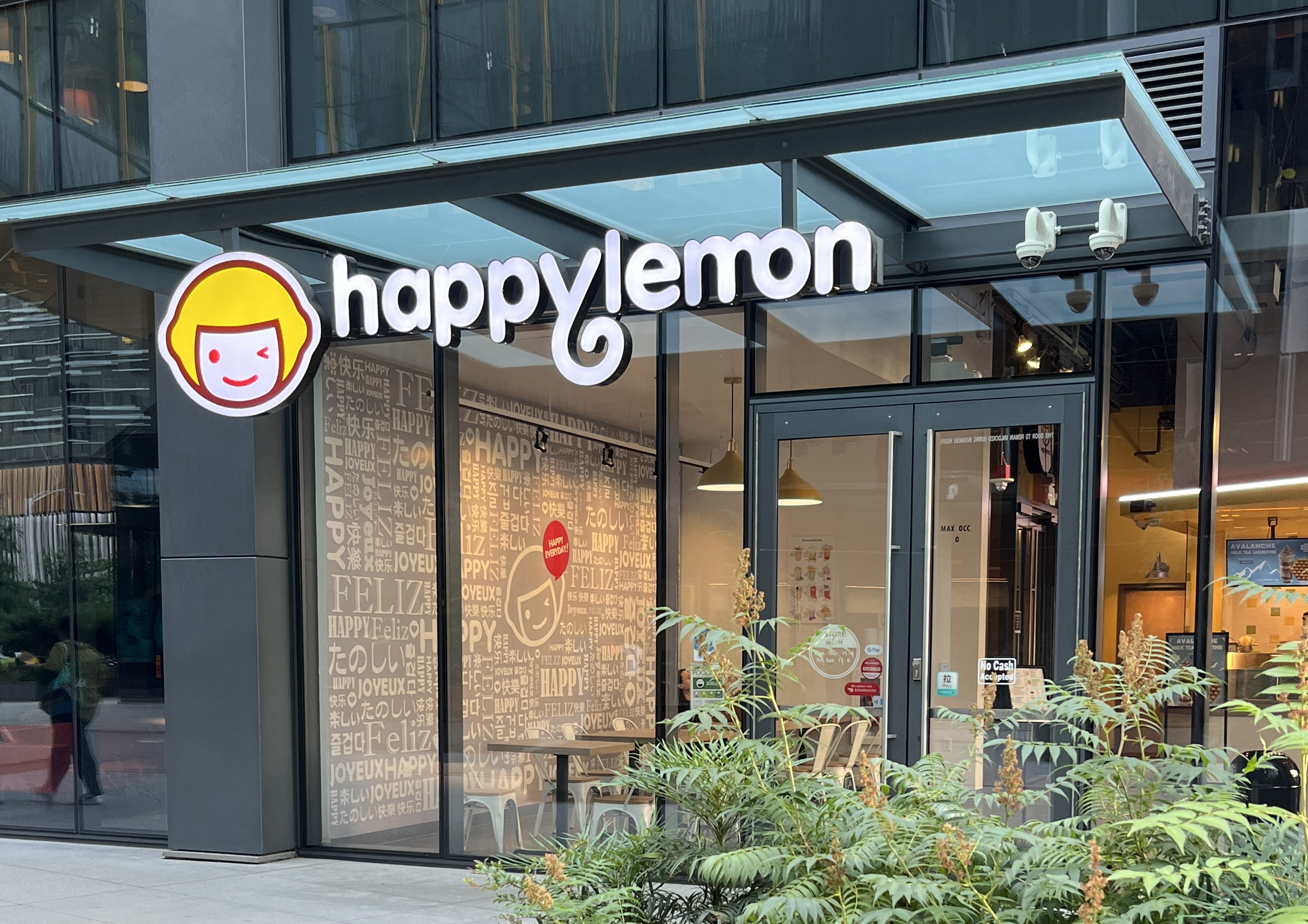
Seattle

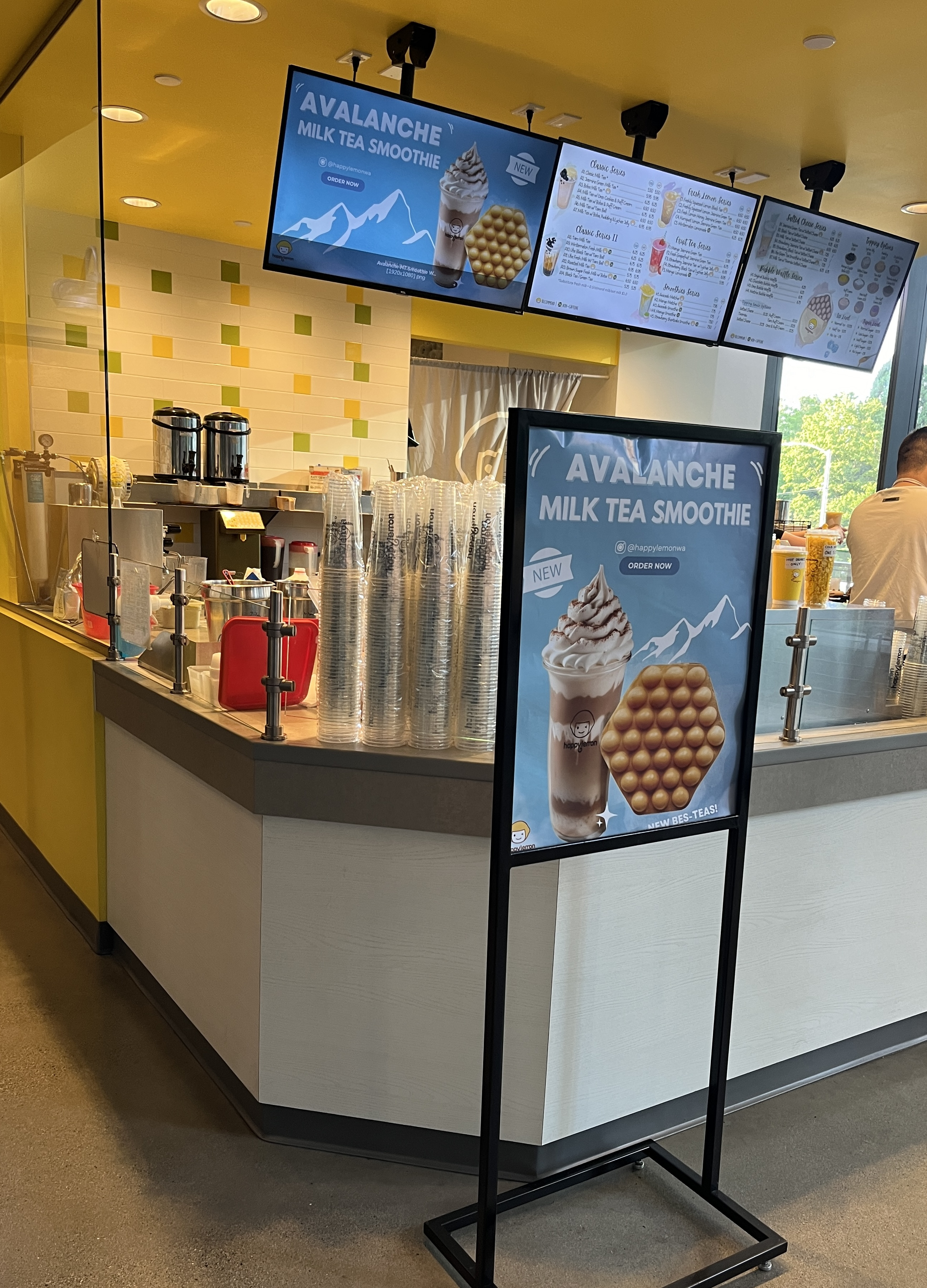
Seattle, Washington
