= CoCo Fresh Tea & Juice =

Taiwanese bubble tea drink franchise

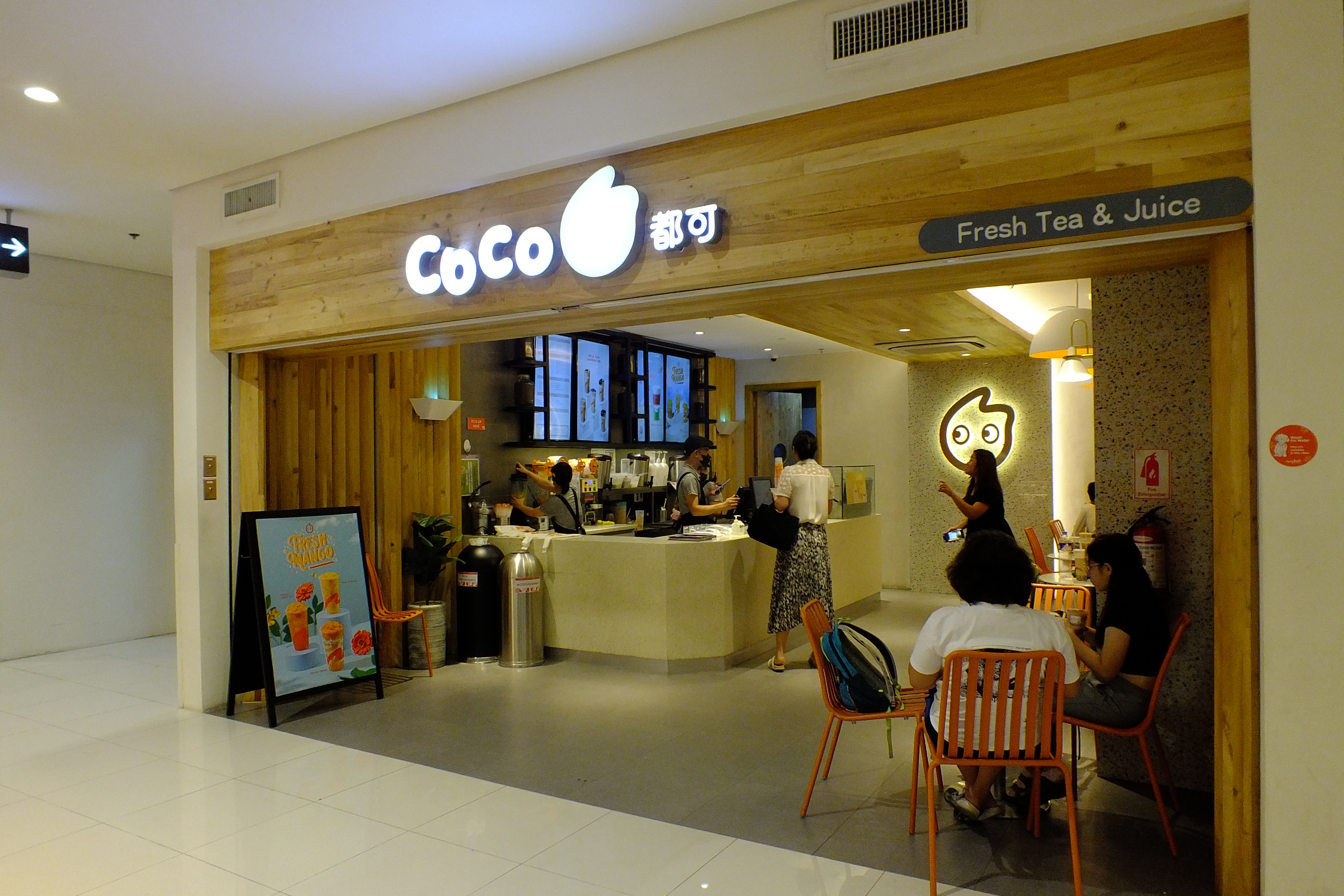
- A CoCo Fresh Tea & Juice outlet at Ayala Malls Central Bloc in Cebu City, Philippines
- Industry: Food and beverage
- Founded: 1997; 29 years ago in Tamsui, Taiwan
- Founder: Tommy Hung
- Headquarters: Taipei, Taiwan
- Area served: China, Taiwan, Japan, Indonesia, Philippines, Thailand, Vietnam, Cambodia, Australia, New Zealand, Europe (France, Spain, Sweden, Netherlands, Belgium, Italy, Germany and UK), North America (Canada, Mexico and the U.S.), Peru
- Products: Bubble tea
- Website: www.coco-tea.com (global site) cocobubbletea.com (New Jersey and New York stores)

CoCo Fresh Tea & Juice (Chinese: CoCo都可茶飲; pinyin: CoCo Dōu Kě Cháyǐn; lit. 'CoCo You Can Drink Tea') is a global bubble tea, or boba, drink franchise based in Taiwan. It was established in 1997 by Tommy Hung, the current chairman. CoCo has more than 5,000 locations in China, South Korea, the U.S., Canada, Mexico, France, Spain, Australia, the United Kingdom, Sweden, Netherlands, Belgium, the Philippines, Indonesia, Japan, Thailand, Vietnam, Mauritius, New Zealand, Italy, Cambodia, Germany and Peru. Its taro milk tea was recommended by Eater.com. Some Hong Kong franchise owners stirred controversy by expressing their support for the Hong Kong protesters with slogans like "Add oil (term of encouragement), Hongkongers" on customers' receipts in 2019.

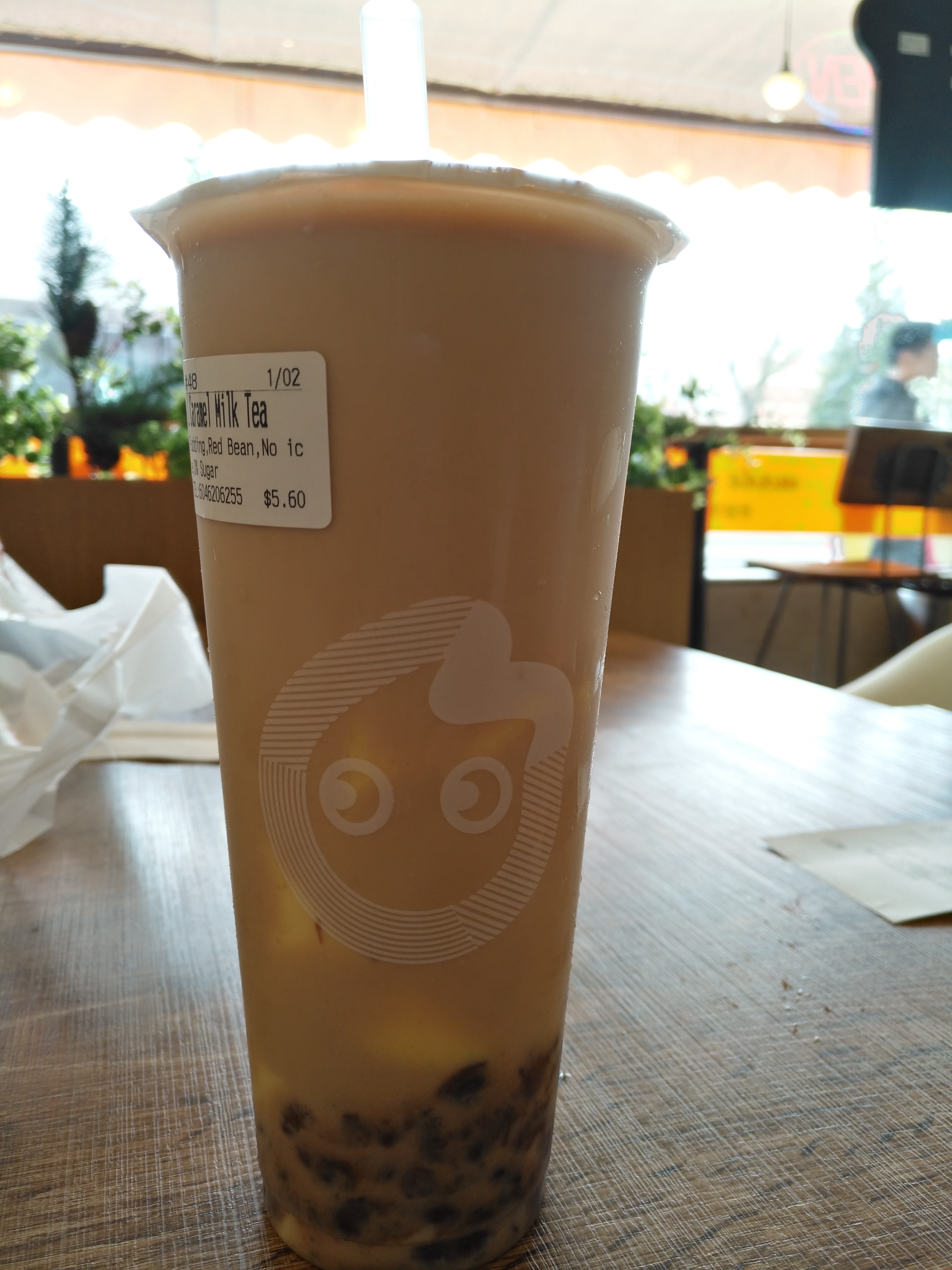
A CoCo Caramel Milktea Drink

== Awards ==
Year	Title	Ref
2017–2018	World Branding Awards	
2024–2025	World Branding Awards	

== See also ==
- List of companies of Taiwan
