= Boba Tea Company =

American bubble tea chain

Coordinates: 35°10′31.7″N 106°32′41.2″W

- Type: Privately held
- Industry: Casual dining
- Founded: Albuquerque, New Mexico, 2005
- Founder: Vi and Hoa Luong
- Headquarters: Albuquerque, New Mexico, United States
- Number of locations: 7 in New Mexico; 7 in Arizona; 1 in Texas
- Area served: Arizona and New Mexico
- Products: Bubble tea
- Website: bobateacompany.com

Boba Tea Company is a bubble tea restaurant chain based in Albuquerque, New Mexico, founded in 2005.

== History ==
The company was founded by Vi and Hoa Luong. The Luongs also own Noble Collectibles, a card and video gaming shop that specializes in selling new and vintage items.

== Reception ==
The Boba Tea Company logo was featured in "Really Good Logos Explained".
