= Hanlin Tea Room =

Chain restaurant from Taiwan

Hanlin Tea Room is a tea house located in Tainan, Taiwan. Tu Tsung-ho, the founder of Hanlin Tea Room claims that in 1986, they were the first tea room to create and offer bubble tea--calling it pearl milk tea "on account of the pearly, semi-translucent tapioca balls." Hanlin Tea Room has expanded over the years to multiple locations. They offer customers the option of the original white tapioca or the black/brown-sugar-sweetened tapioca pearls.
