= Boba ice cream bar =

Ice cream dessert

- Type: Dessert
- Main ingredients: Tapioca balls, ice cream

Boba ice cream bars are a frozen dessert of an ice cream bar with tapioca pearls, otherwise known as boba, throughout. The ice cream is usually made from dairy products, and can be flavored with other ingredients, such as green tea or thai tea. The boba is made out of tapioca starch, becoming gelatinous when cooked.

The bars are sold commercially in both Japan and the United States, and are typically kept frozen and defrosted slightly before eating.

== History ==
The idea of boba ice cream bars came from the Taiwanese drink of bubble tea; that is, tea served with tapioca pearls.

== Process ==
Boba ice cream bars consist of ice cream and boba. A mixture of whole milk, heavy whipping cream, sugar, vanilla, and any additional flavors are mixed in a bowl until the mixture is homogeneous. Once homogeneous, the mixture is poured into an ice cream maker. Boba typically consists of tapioca starch, sweet rice flour (mochiko), brown sugar, and water. The dough is rolled into tiny spheres. The spheres are cooked in boiling water. When done, it is cooled in an ice bath so that they do not stick together. The boba is then mixed in with the ice cream. The boba and ice cream mixture is then put into popsicle molds and put into the freezer until the popsicles are hardened.

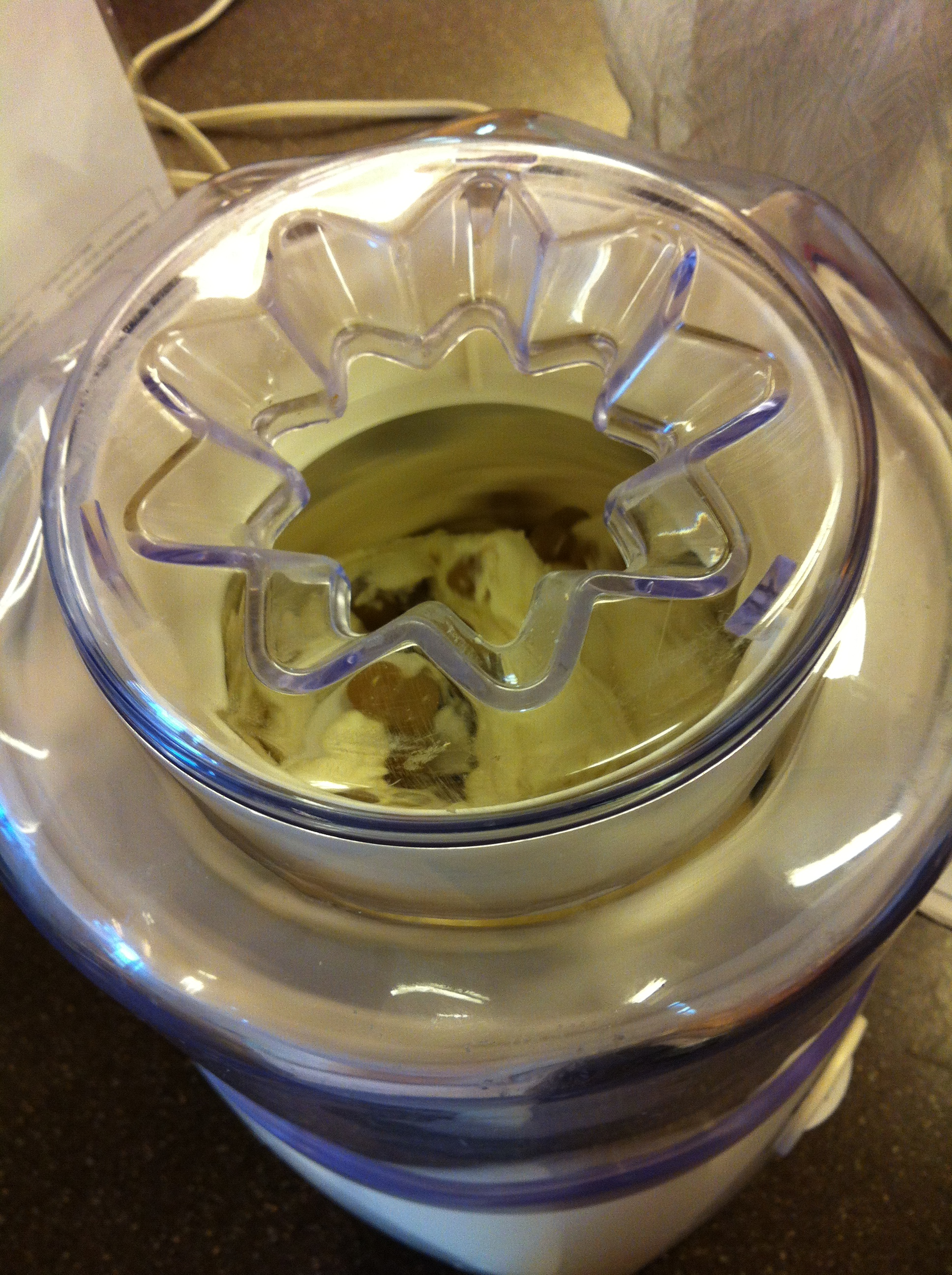
Mixing the boba with the ice cream
