= Gong Cha =

Taiwan bubble tea chain

Gong Cha Global Limited
- Industry: Food and beverage
- Founded: 2006; 20 years ago in Kaohsiung, Taiwan
- Headquarters: London, United Kingdom
- Area served: Worldwide
- Key people: Wu Zhenhua (吳振華) (Founder); Martin Edward Berry (CEO)
- Parent: Gong Cha Korea (70%); Gong Cha Global (30%)
- Website: www.gong-cha.com

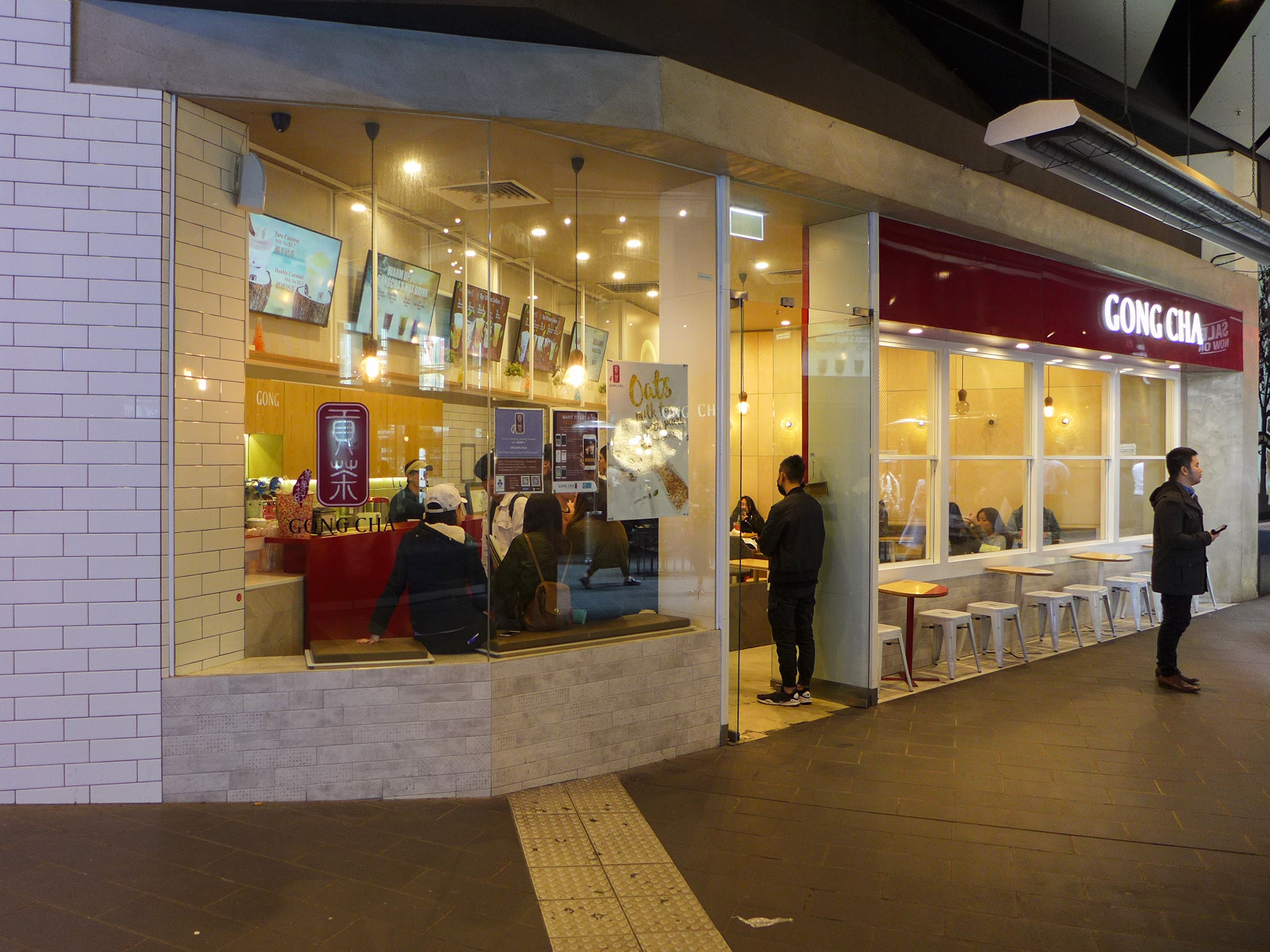
Gong Cha in QV Square, Melbourne, Australia

Gong Cha (Chinese: 貢茶; pinyin: Gòngchá) is a tea drink franchise founded in 2006 in Kaohsiung, Taiwan.

== Name ==
The name is a combination of the Chinese characters "貢", meaning contribution or tribute, and "茶", referring to tea.

== History ==
Gong Cha, a tea company, was founded in 2006 in Kaohsiung, Taiwan. Its first store in Hong Kong was established in 2009 by a Hong Kong native who had lived in Taiwan for five years.

In 2012, the company had forty-six stores in Hong Kong, primarily located in MTR stations and shopping centers. However, due to various health and safety scandals, the number of stores has decreased to just five. Gong Cha serves approximately fifty-seven different drinks, divided into seven types: house specials, brewed tea, milk tea, Creative Mix, coffee, Healthy Series, and ice smoothies. These drinks are offered in medium and large sizes. Additionally, Gong Cha sells tea sets and various types of tea in stores, such as Bi-Luo-Chun Green Tea and Darjeeling Spring Tea. Some locations also provide food options, including the recent addition of "Mochi Waffles."

In 2017, 70% of ownership was sold to Kim Yeo-Jin (김여진; 金汝貞), owner of Gong Cha Korea, Gong Cha's Korea franchisee, with backing from private equity firm Unison Capital.

In January 2017, Gong Cha's main headquarters was acquired by Gong Cha Korea. CEO Kim Soo-Min has announced plans to expand to the Middle East and Latin America.

In 2019, TA Associates agreed to provide growth investment to Gong Cha and later bought 100% of Gong Cha Korea. UK company GC Group BIDCO Limited bought the remaining 30% in the same year, with GC Group BIDCO renamed to Gong Cha Global in 2020, moving the global headquarters to UK.

In October 2025, it was reported that Gong Cha had closed all its outlets in Singapore. Gong Cha will return to Singapore in 2026 with a new franchise partner.

Bain Capital announced in August 2026 that it had acquired Gong Cha for an undisclosed sum. Industry reports indicate that the deal is valued at over $635 million.

== Stores ==
As of 2025 Gong Cha operates over 2100 locations in 28 markets.

=== Asia ===
- Taiwan (since 2006)
- Hong Kong (since 2009)
- Singapore (2009 to 2017; 2017 to 2025; returning in 2026)
- Macau (since 2010)
- Malaysia (since 2011)
- The Philippines (since 2011)
- South Korea (since 2011)
- China (Gong Cha completely withdrew from the Chinese market in 2024)
- Brunei (since 2013)
- Cambodia (2013 to 2016; since 2021)
- Vietnam (since 2014)
- Myanmar
- Japan (since 2015)
- Indonesia (since 2020)
- Mongolia (since 2025)
- Thailand (since 2025)

=== Africa and the Middle East ===
- Morocco (since 2024)
- Saudi Arabia (since 2024)
- Mauritius (since 2024)
- Réunion (since 2024)
- Bahrain (future opening)
- United Arab Emirates (future opening)

=== North America ===
- United States (since 2014)
- Canada
- Mexico (since 2019)
- Honduras (since 2024)
- Panama (since 2024)
- Puerto Rico (since 2024)
- The Bahamas (future opening)
- Costa Rica (future opening)
- El Salvador (future opening)
- Guatemala (future opening)

=== South America ===
- Colombia (since 2025)
- Ecuador (since 2025)

=== Europe ===
- England (since 2019)
- Belgium (since 2022)
- France (since 2023)
- Portugal (since 2023)
- Ireland (since 2025)

=== Oceania ===
- Australia (since 2012)
- New Zealand (since 2015)

== See also ==
- Bubble tea
- Tea house
- Tea culture
- List of companies of Taiwan
