= Chun Shui Tang =

Inventor of bubble tea

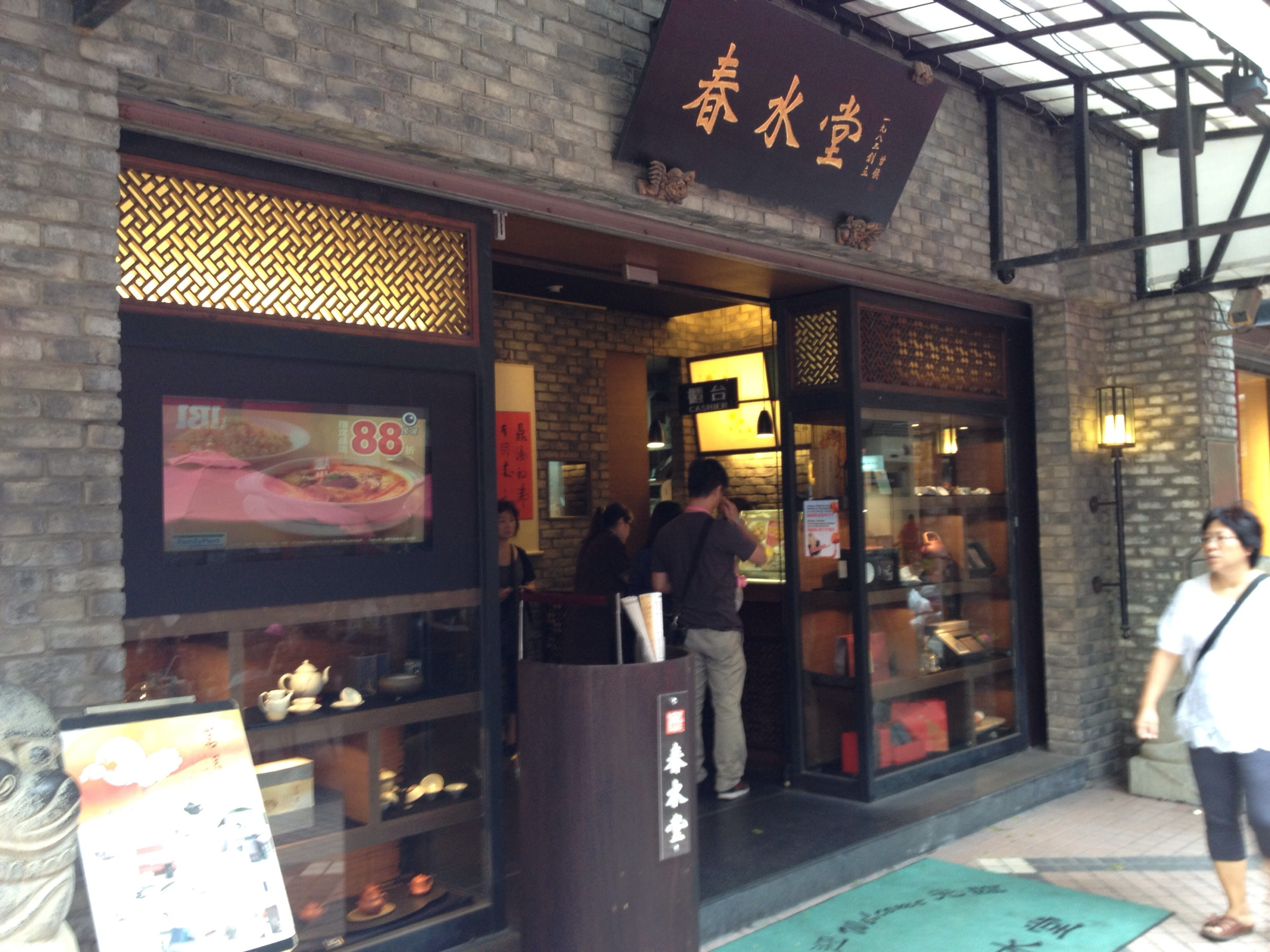
- A Chun Shui Tang store in Taichung
- Native name: 春水堂
- Formerly: 陽羨茶館
- Industry: Restaurant
- Founded: May 20, 1983; 43 years ago
- Founder: Liu Han-chieh
- Headquarters: Taichung, Taiwan
- Products: Bubble tea
- Website: chunshuitang.com.tw

Chun Shui Tang (Chinese: 春水堂人文茶館; pinyin: Chūnshuǐtáng Rénwéncháguǎn) is an international teahouse chain based in Taichung, Taiwan. Founded in 1983 as the name Yanghsien Tea Shop, it is known for the origin of bubble tea. Besides bubble tea, Chun Shui Tang also serve traditional Taiwanese dishes and snacks.

Aside from restaurants, Chun Shui Tang owns TP Tea, another chain of take-out stores that mainly sell bubble tea.

== History ==
Chun Shui Tang was founded as Yangmu Tea Shop (陽羨茶館) on May 20, 1983, by Han-chieh Liu (劉漢介) on Siwei Street in Taichung. Fascinated by formalities of Chinese tea culture, Liu was very insistent on his decor and placed old paintings and burnt incense in his shop. As hot tea does not sell as well in the summer months, Liu began experimenting with cold tea drinks using a cocktail shaker, which sold unexpectedly well. He was inspired to serve cold tea after seeing cold coffee being served during a trip to Japan. The chain claims to have invented bubble milk tea in March 1987 when Lin Hsiu Hui (林秀慧) poured tapioca into a tea drink on a whim.

In 2013, Chun Shui Tang established their first store outside Taiwan in Daikanyama, an upscale shopping district in Tokyo, Japan. Since then, more stores have opened in Japan, causing a boom in bubble tea's popularity in Japan. In 2018, Chun Shui Tang opened another store in Hong Kong's West Kowloon railway station. As of late 2020, Chun Shui Tang has opened 8 branches in Hong Kong, including Causeway Bay and Mong Kok.

== Menu ==
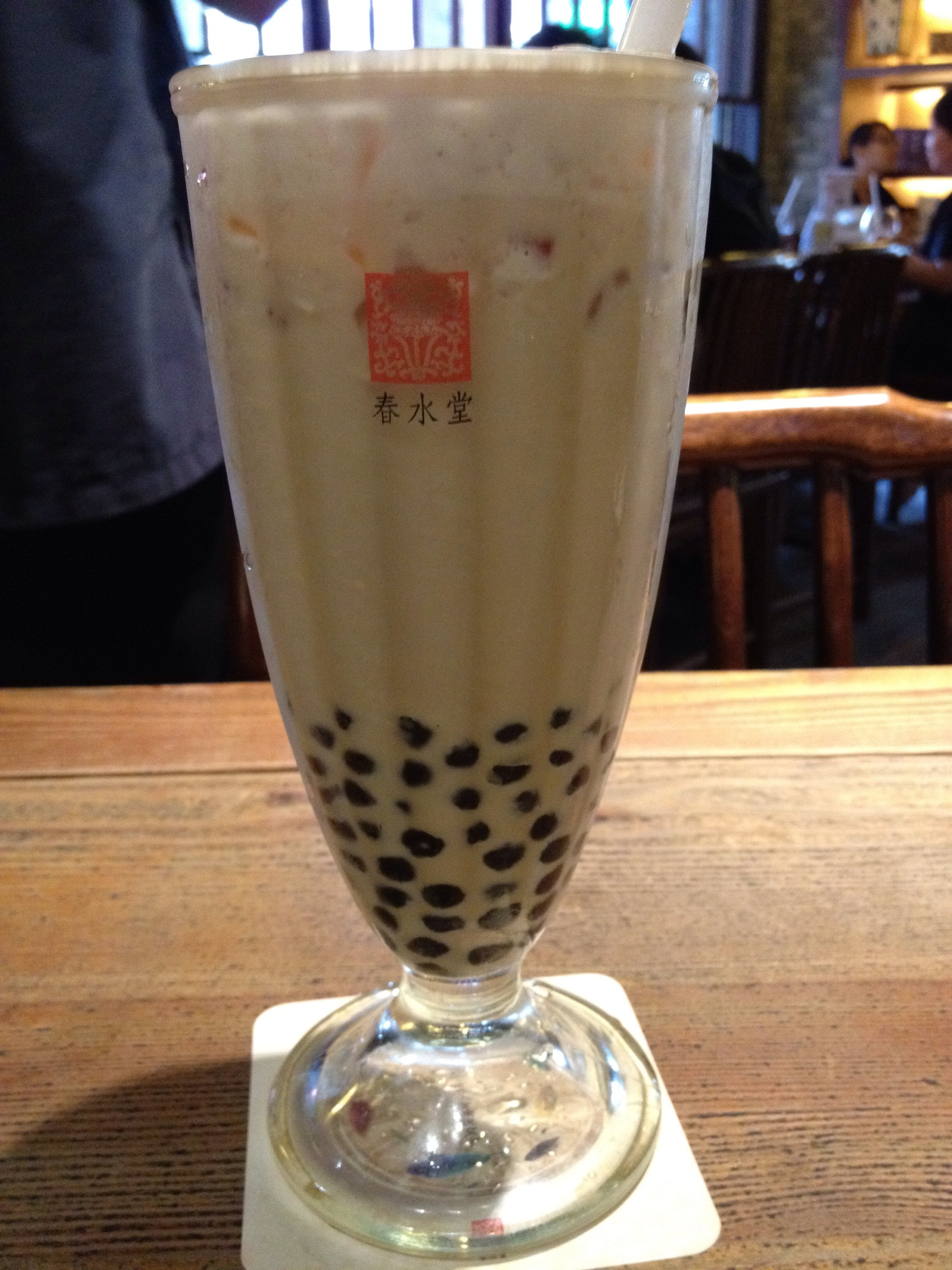
A cup of bubble tea in Chun Shui Tang.

Chun Shui Tang specializes in bubble tea, but they also serve a wide variety of East Asian food, including gaifan dishes, beef noodle soup, lu wei, dougan, pig's blood cake, mochi, and more. It takes six months for a bar worker to learn to make the 80 or so drinks on the menu. Chun Shui Tang offers different seasonal products by time to time, e.g. Uji Matcha series, Herbal Jelly series etc.

== See also ==
- List of companies of Taiwan
