= Kung Fu Tea =

American beverage restaurant chain

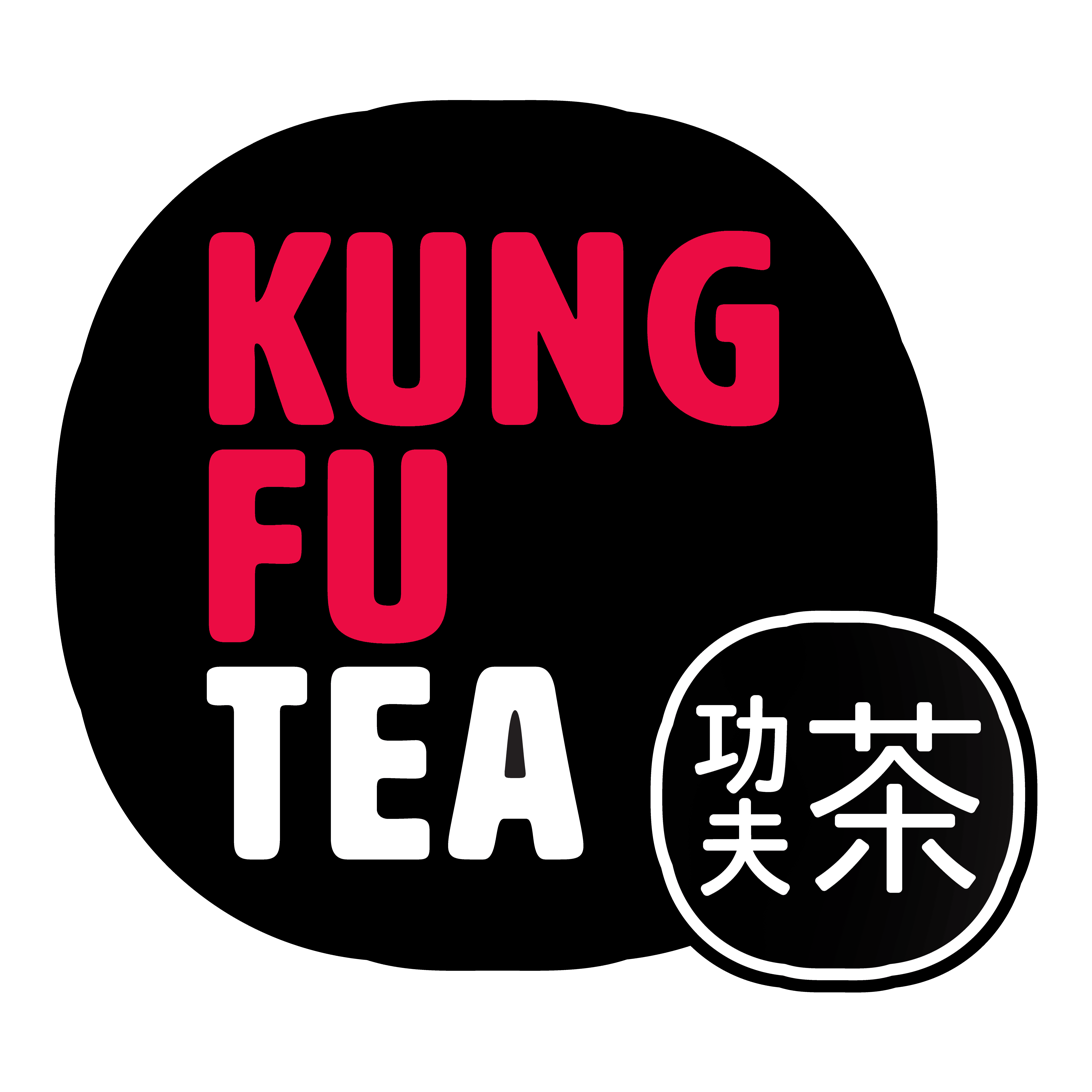
- Kung Fu Tea's logo
- Type: Privately held company
- Industry: Food and beverage
- Founded: April 30, 2010; 16 years ago in Flushing, Queens
- Headquarters: New York City, United States
- Number of locations: ▲370 (2020)
- Area served: United States, Canada, Japan, Cambodia, Taiwan
- Products: Bubble Tea; Tea; Slushys; chicken
- Website: www.kungfutea.com

Kung Fu Tea (Chinese: 功夫茶; pinyin: Gōngfūchá) is an American bubble tea franchise headquartered in New York City. The company was founded on April 30, 2010, in Queens, NY. It is the largest American bubble tea company, with over 350+ locations across the United States. On April 30, 2018, Kung Fu Tea founded the world's first National Bubble Tea Day.

In 2021, Kung Fu Tea was recorded among Nation's Restaurant News Top 500 Restaurant Chains.

== Partnerships ==
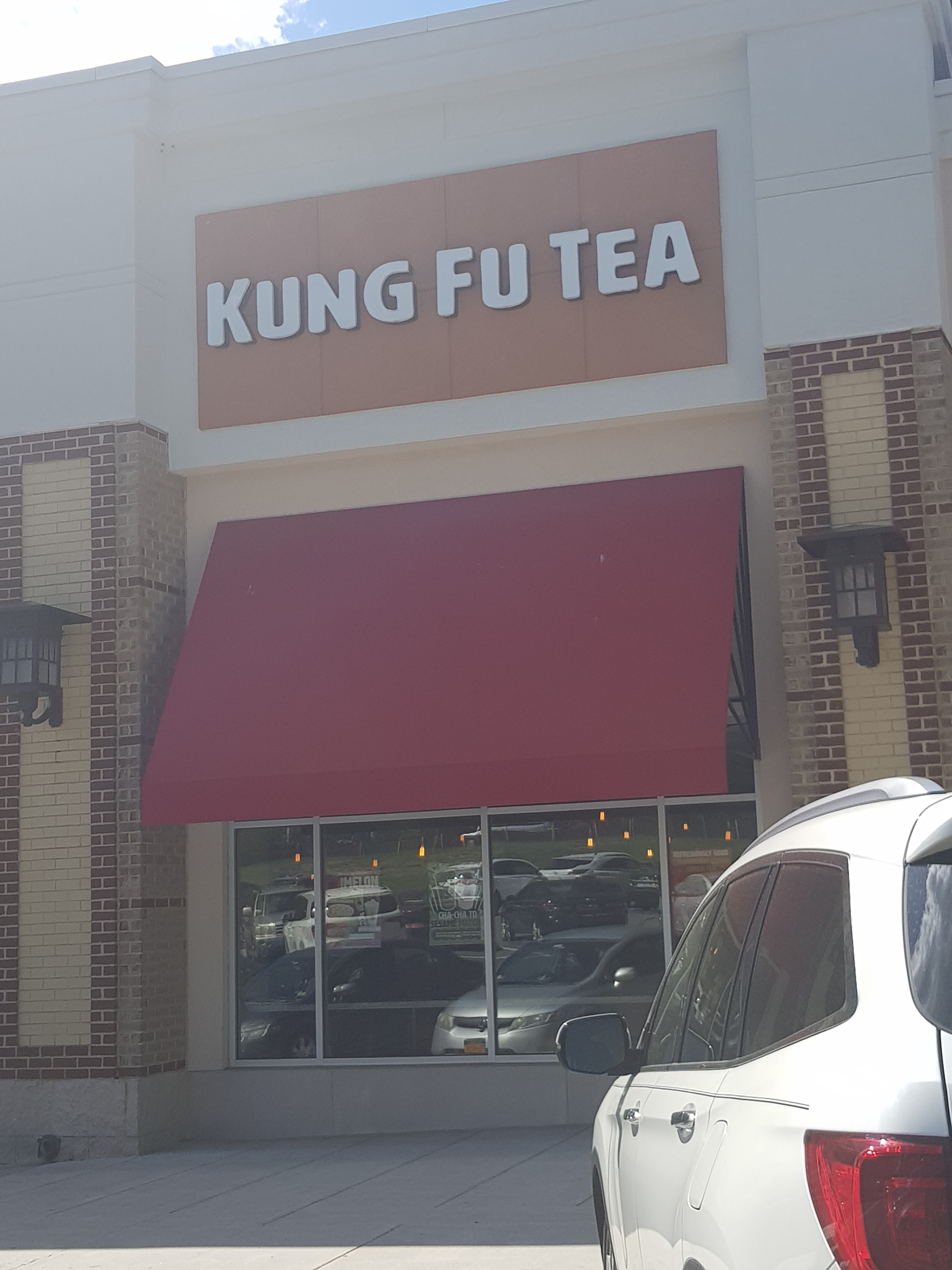
Exterior of a Kung Fu Tea shop in the U.S. state of Virginia, 2019

Kung Fu Tea partnered with Funimation to distribute drinks based on the anime Fruits Basket. They also partnered with various video games and video game companies, including Nintendo, Honkai Impact 3rd, Pokémon Go in May 2023, and Pikmin 4 in July 2023. They have also collaborated with Spirit Halloween in October 2023, and with the clothing company Opening Ceremony.

On November 30, 2018, the company partnered with Taiwan-based restaurant chain TKK Fried Chicken to open collaborative locations in the United States.

== See also ==
- Tea house
- Tea culture
- Xing Fu Tang
