= Tiger Sugar =

Taiwanese chain of bubble tea shops

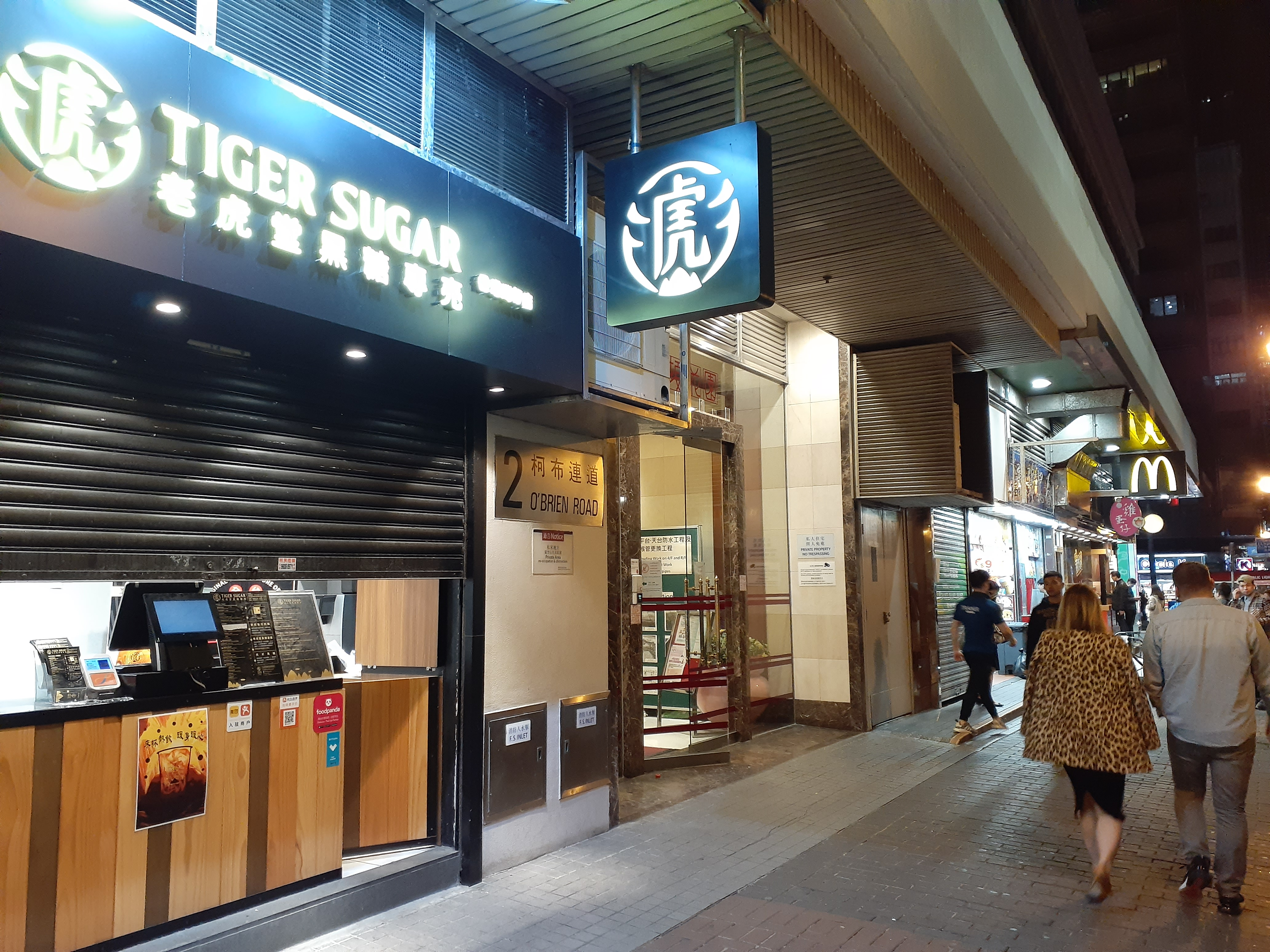
- Tiger Sugar shop in Hong Kong, 2020

Restaurant information
- Established: 2017
- Website: tigersugar.co

Tiger Sugar (Chinese: 老虎堂) is a Taiwanese chain of bubble tea shops. Established in Taichung in November 2017, the chain has operated in Canada, China, Hong Kong, Macau, Malaysia, Philippines, Singapore, South Korea, Thailand, and the United States.

== Menu ==
According to Tasting Table, the chain's bubble teas are known for their "creamy brown sugar flavor and unique tiger stripe pattern". The signature product is a black sugar milk tea with boba and cream mousse.

== Locations ==
=== Asia ===
In Taiwan, there are multiple locations in Taipei.

Tiger Sugar has operated in Hong Kong since 2018, as well as Macau and Singapore.

=== Europe ===
In the United Kingdom, the business operates in Leeds.

=== North America ===
There were approximately two dozen shops in the United States, as of 2022. Shops opened in downtown Flushing and in Manhattan's Chinatown in 2019. On the West Coast, Tiger Sugar has operated in: Cupertino; Los Angeles; Beaverton, Oregon; and Seattle. There are also shops in Arizona, Kentucky, Massachusetts, North Carolina, Ohio and Nevada.

In Canada, the business has operated in Toronto and Vancouver.

== Reception ==
Clara Wang included Tiger Sugar in Eat This, Not That's 2024 list of ten chains with the best bubble tea.
