= Xing Fu Tang =

Taiwanese bubble tea chain

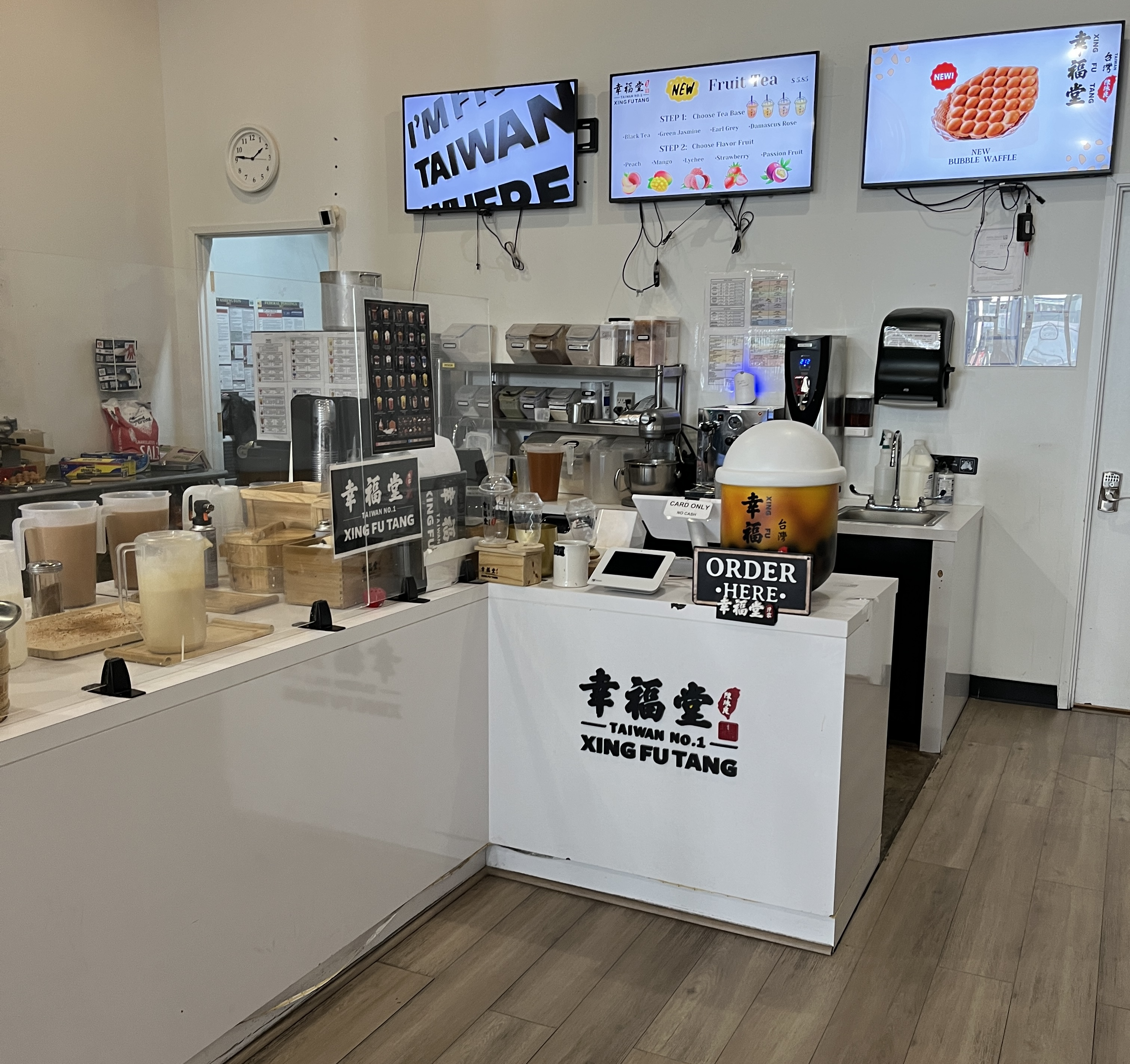
- Interior of a shop in Seattle in 2024
- Type: Private
- Industry: Bubble tea
- Founded: January 2018; 8 years ago in Taipei, Taiwan
- Founder: Edison Chen
- Headquarters: Taipei, Taiwan
- Number of locations: 150+ (2023)
- Area served: Worldwide (18+ countries)
- Products: Bubble tea; milk tea

Xing Fu Tang (Chinese: 幸福堂; pinyin: Xìngfú táng; transl. realm of happiness) is a Taiwanese multinational chain of bubble tea restaurants. Founded by Edison Chen in Taipei in 2018, the franchise has expanded to over 150 locations in over 18 countries as of 2023. It has been dubbed "the Hermès of bubble tea" due to its luxury menu items, including flame-torched brown sugar boba milk and boba milk topped with gold foil.

== History ==
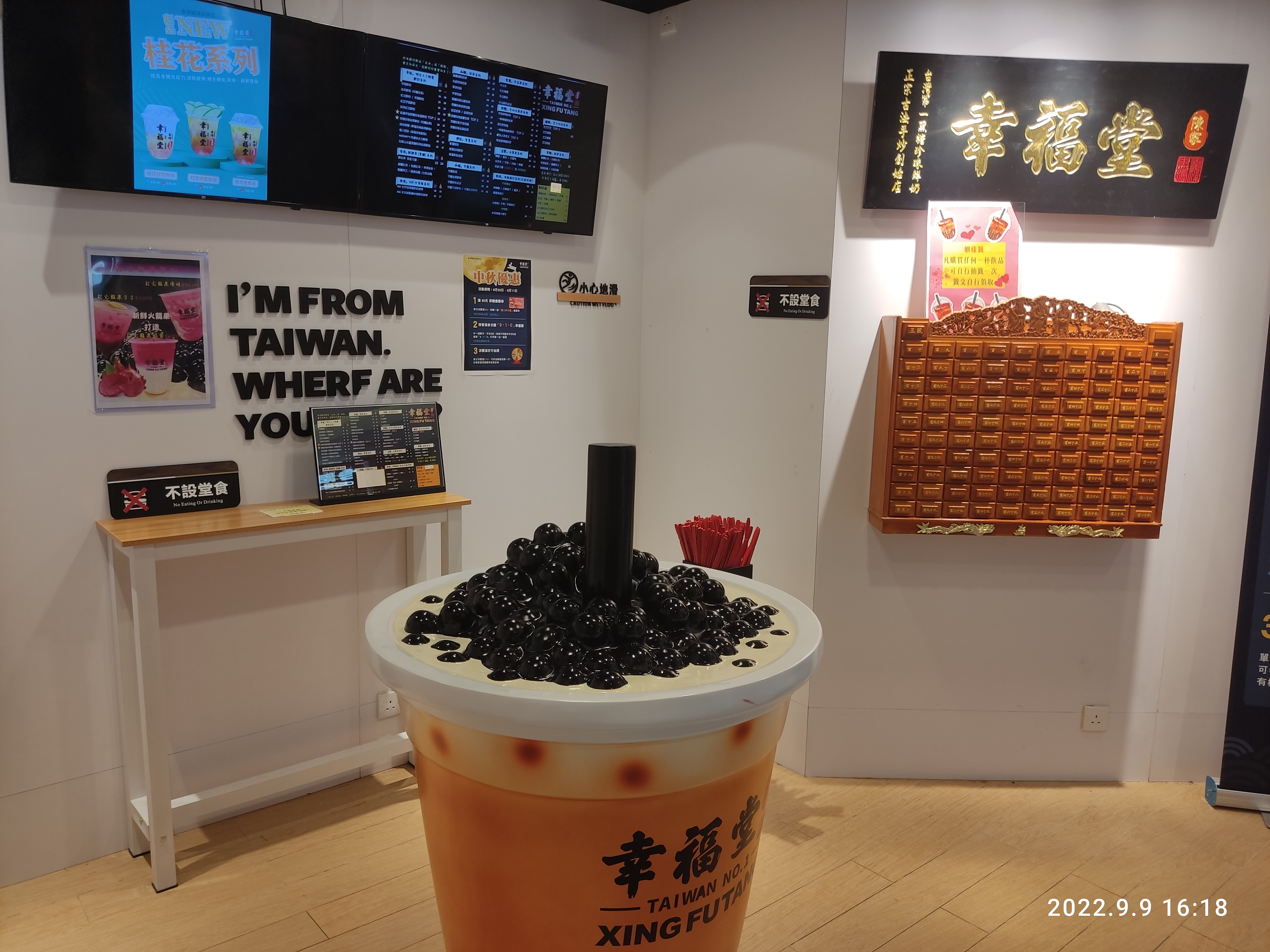
Shop in Hong Kong in 2022

Xing Fu Tang was founded in January 2018 in Taipei, Taiwan, by entrepreneur Edison Chen. The brand name, which translates to "realm of happiness", as well as the restaurant's flagship brown sugar boba milk recipe, was inspired by Chen's grandmother.

The franchise rapidly expanded, opening over 60 locations in Taiwan by May 2019, and over 100 locations worldwide by 2020. Early expansions outside of Taiwan included Hong Kong, Shenzhen, and Vancouver in 2018, the Philippines, with two locations opening in Manila in early 2019, and Singapore, whose first location opened in June 2019 at Century Square. The first United States location opened in Flushing, Queens, New York City, in January 2020. In 2018, Xing Fu Tang Canada regional manager Nelson Lam said the chain aimed to become "the Starbucks of bubble tea".

As of 2023, the chain has expanded to over 150 locations in over 18 countries across five continents.

=== Franchise disputes ===
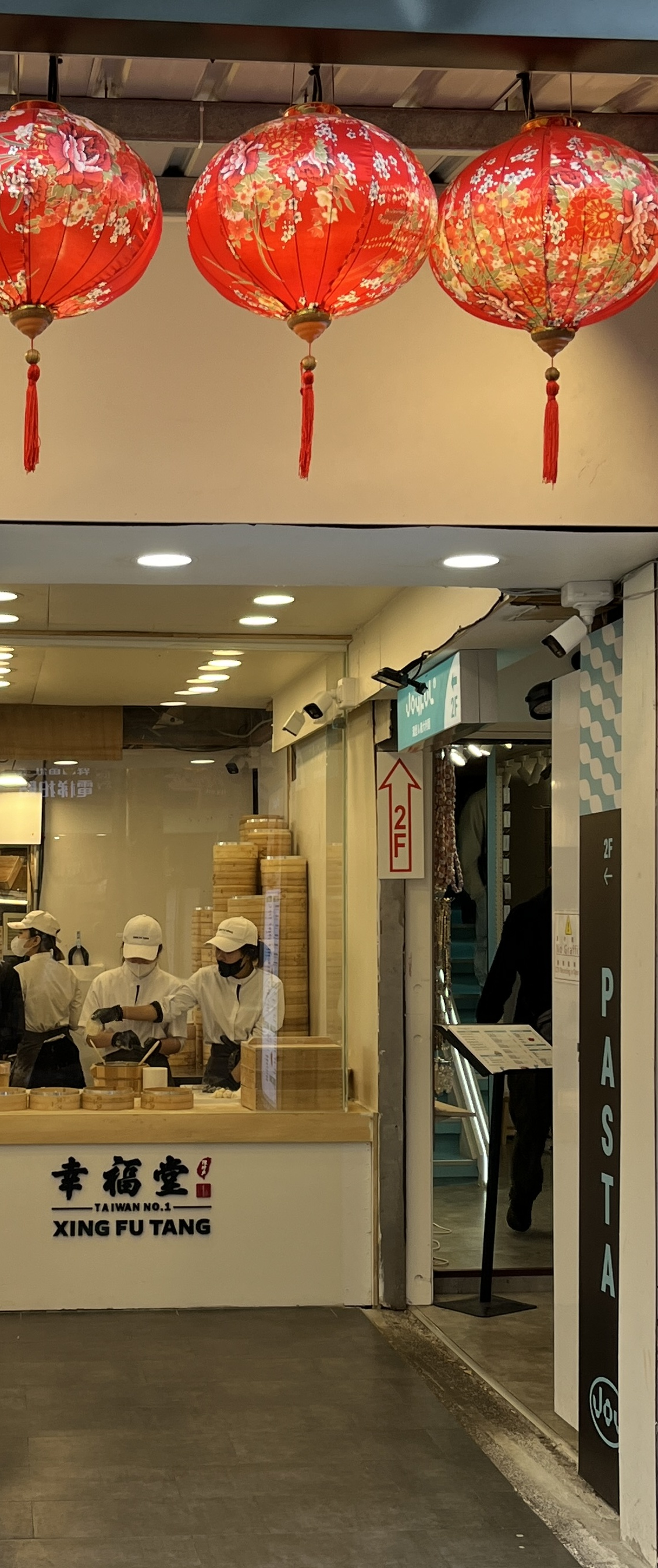
Shop in Taipei, Taiwan, 2024

During its rapid expansion, Xing Fu Tang faced several franchise disputes. In January 2019, Xing Fu Tang founding distributor CEO International sued the chain's Hong Kong franchise distributor Tenpence, accusing them of breach of contract for asserting sole ownership of the Xing Fu Tang brand in Hong Kong. As a result, all three existing Hong Kong locations of Xing Fu Tang were forced to shut down.

In October 2019, the franchisees of 34 Xing Fu Tang locations in Malaysia issued a series of complaints against the company on Facebook, asserting exclusive ownership of the Xing Fu Tang brand in Malaysia and citing exorbitant franchise fees and raw material costs, after the franchisees refused the company's demands to order RM4.5 million worth of heart-shaped boba molding machines. Xing Fu Tang Taiwan subsequently sued the franchisees for breach of contract, while also committing to provide financial assistance in order to cover their franchise fees.

The Malaysian franchisees struck back on Facebook, asserting they had not breached the franchising contract, accusing the parent company of defamation, and stating they had been "bullied" by the parent company, who threatened to terminate the franchising contract if the franchisees did not purchase the molding machines. In response, Xing Fu Tang Taiwan alleged that the machines were merely a "test" to see if the Malaysian franchisees were truly committed to the company and maintained that the franchisees were breaching their contract, to which the franchisees replied, "We hope that the Taiwan HQ will stop with the ridiculous accusations and ruining Xing Fu Tang’s reputation further."

In 2021, Xing Fu Tang Taiwan issued a statement on Instagram accusing franchisees in Texas and California of breaching their franchise contract by opening stores without proper authorization, purchasing ingredients from unauthorized sources, and failing to pay franchise fees. Xing Fu Tang U.S. CEO Andrew Chuang called these allegations "baseless" and "unprofessional", asserting Xing Fu Tang U.S. was operating within their rights as Xing Fu Tang's "sole master franchisor" in the United States.

== Menu ==
Xing Fu Tang's flagship drink is brown sugar boba milk, whose boba pearls are stir-fried and caramelized in a golden wok in front of customers before the drink is browned with a flame torch. Other popular drinks include strawberry boba milk, mango smoothie with rabbit panna cotta, and the luxury gold foil boba milk, which in part has earned the company the nickname "the Hermès of bubble tea".

The company uses an open-kitchen concept, allowing customers to see the creation of their drinks from start to finish, including the kneading and molding of boba dough. The company also emphasizes fresh ingredients, noting that its ingredients are handmade and prepared fresh daily at every location worldwide.

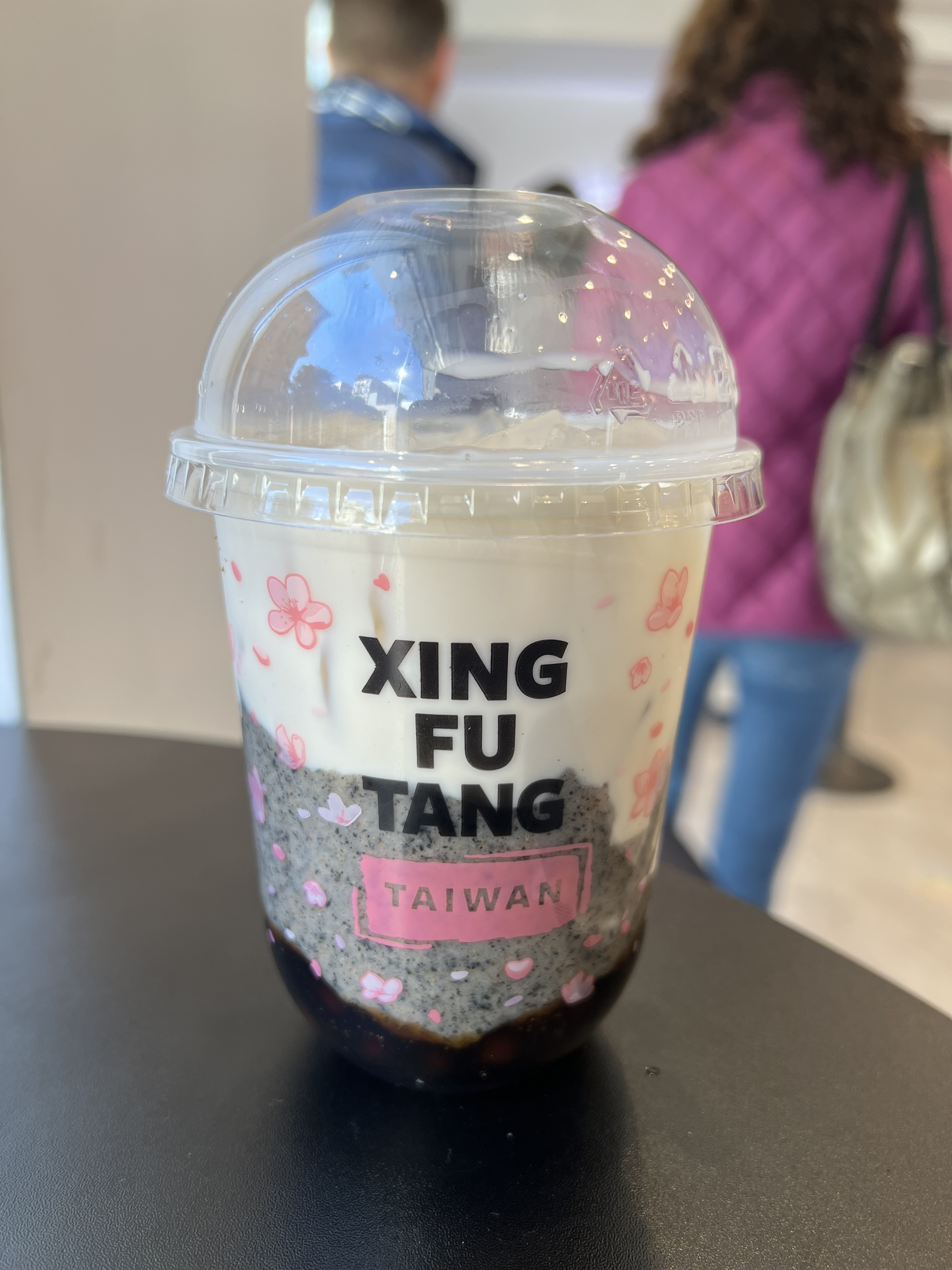
Black sesame boba milk, New York City, 2024

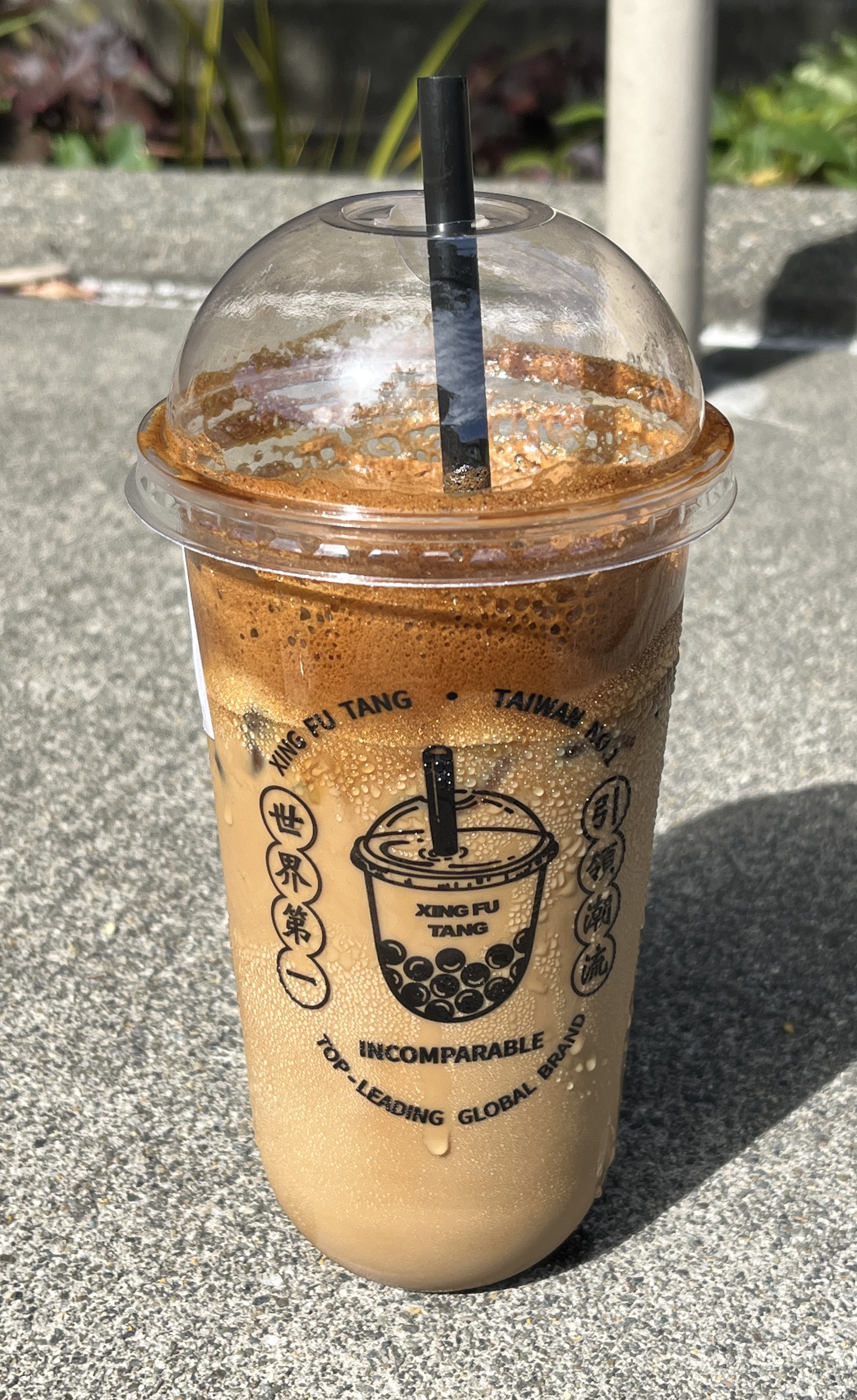
Dalgona coffee latte, Seattle, 2024

== See also ==
- Kung Fu Tea
