= Popping boba =

Topping used in bubble tea

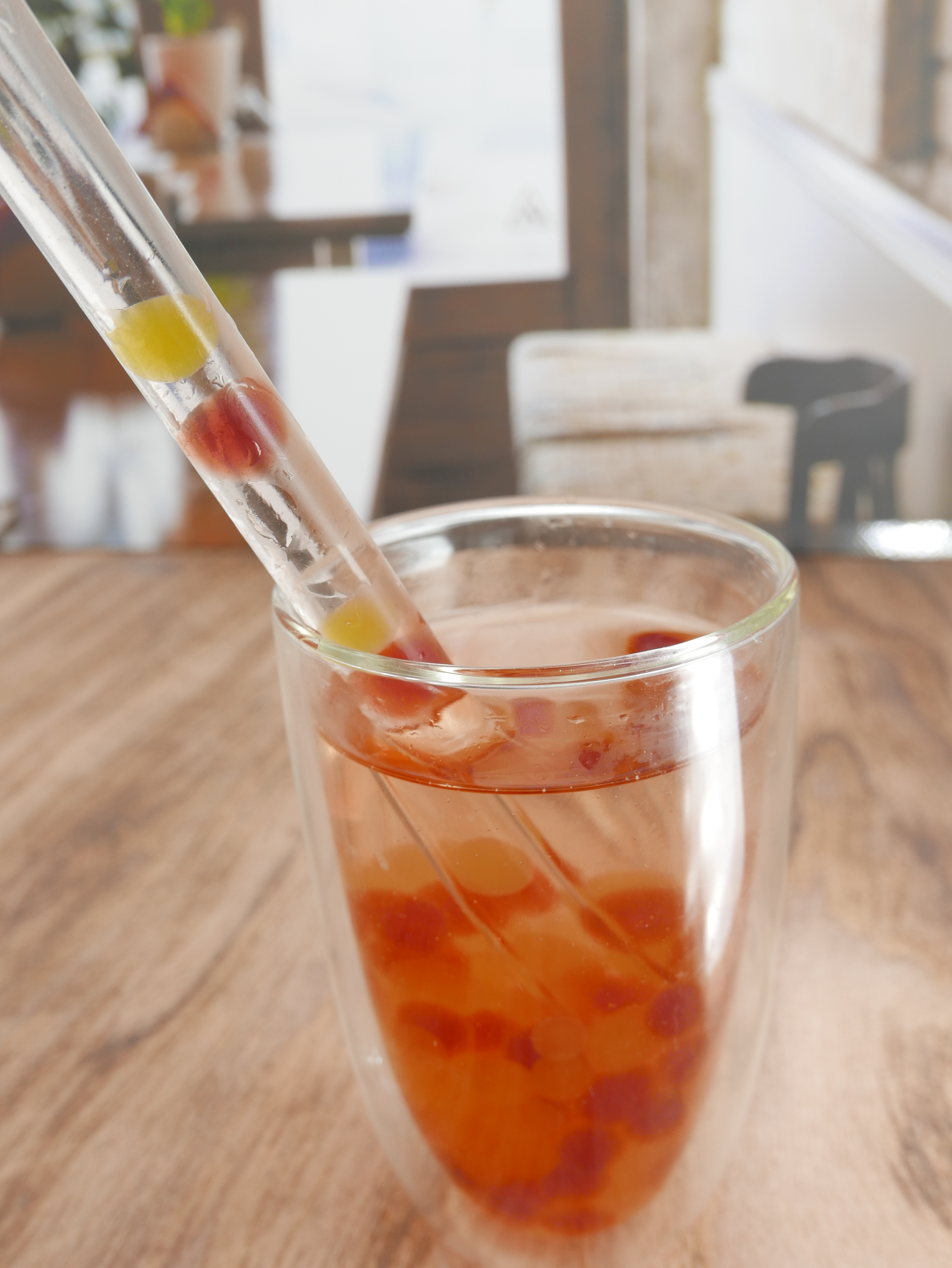
- Popping boba in bubble tea, being drunk through a straw.
- Course: Drink

Popping boba, also called popping pearls, is a type of boba used in bubble tea. Unlike traditional boba, which is tapioca-based, popping boba is made using the spherification process that relies on the reaction of sodium alginate and either calcium chloride or calcium lactate. Popping boba has a thin, gel-like skin with juice inside that bursts when squeezed. The ingredients for popping boba generally consist of water, sugar, fruit juice or other flavors, and the ingredients required for spherification.

In addition to being used in place of traditional boba in bubble tea, it is used in smoothies, slushies and as a topping for frozen yogurt.

Some popular flavors of popping boba include mango, passion fruit, strawberry, green tea, honeydew melon, pomegranate, blueberry, lychee, coconut, raspberry, pineapple, dragon fruit and kiwi.

Popping boba originated in Taiwan and is believed to have emerged in the 1980s, evolving from traditional tapioca pearls into a more creative and versatile topping. Today, it is widely used in bubble tea, frozen yogurt, and desserts, gaining rapid popularity worldwide—especially in the United States—and making a notable impact on the beverage and dessert industry.

== Beverage applications ==
Popping boba is widely used as a flavor and texture enhancer in a variety of cold beverages. It is commonly paired with fruit teas, cold brew teas, sparkling sodas, mocktails, smoothies, slushies, and yogurt drinks. The liquid-filled pearls provide a sudden burst of fruit juice that adds a refreshing, interactive element while contrasting with smooth, icy, or creamy liquid bases. Because of its bright visual appeal and versatile flavor profile, popping boba is frequently utilized by cafés and beverage brands to develop highly shareable, limited-time seasonal drink menus.

== Dessert applications ==
Beyond beverages, popping boba is used in a variety of desserts as a topping and texture ingredient. It is commonly paired with frozen yogurt, ice cream, shaved ice, puddings, panna cotta, cakes, parfaits, and jelly desserts. The liquid-filled pearls provide a bursting texture that contrasts with creamy or soft dessert bases, while also adding color and flavor. Because of these characteristics, popping boba is frequently used in both freshly prepared desserts and ready-to-eat chilled dessert products.

== Savory applications ==
Oil-filled popping pearls are made using a similar method to popping boba, with flavored oils such as chili oil, wasabi oil, or olive oil enclosed within a thin edible membrane. They are primarily used in savory dishes as a seasoning and textural element. Common applications include salads, seafood, sushi, cold appetizers, meat dishes, pasta, and hors d'oeuvres. When the outer membrane is bitten, the flavored oil is released, delivering a concentrated burst of aroma and flavor while creating a contrast with the texture of the dish. Because their appearance resembles caviar, oil-filled popping pearls are also used as garnishes in plated dishes and fine dining presentations.
