= Bubble tea =

Tea-based drink with chewy bubbles

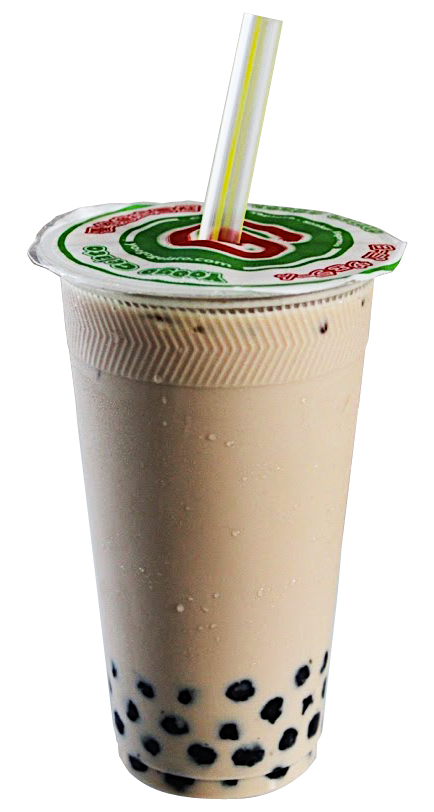
- A cup of bubble tea
- Alternative names: Boba; Pearl milk tea Boba milk tea Boba tea Boba nai cha Tapioca tea
- Course: Drink
- Place of origin: Taiwan
- Region or state: Worldwide
- Invented: 1980s
- Serving temperature: Hot or cold
- Main ingredients: Tapioca, milk, creamer, brewed tea, sugar, flavorings

Bubble tea (also known as pearl milk tea, bubble milk tea, tapioca milk tea, boba tea, or boba; Chinese: 珍珠奶茶; pinyin: zhēnzhū nǎichá, 波霸奶茶; bōbà nǎichá) is a tea-based drink most often containing chewy tapioca pearls, milk, and flavoring. It originated in Taiwan in the 1980s and spread to other countries where there is a large East Asian diaspora population.

Bubble tea is most commonly made with tapioca pearls (also known as "boba" or "balls"), but it can be made with other toppings as well, such as grass jelly, aloe vera, red bean, and popping boba. It has many varieties and flavors, but the two most popular varieties are pearl black milk tea and pearl green milk tea ("pearl" for the tapioca balls at the bottom). Some of the largest global bubble tea chains include Chatime, CoCo Fresh Tea & Juice, Gong Cha, and Xing Fu Tang.

Two Taiwanese tea rooms, Chun Shui Tang in Taichung, and Hanlin Tea Room in Tainan, claim the invention of bubble tea in 1987 and 1986 respectively; litigation between them resulted in a 2019 ruling that bubble tea was non-patentable. Introduced to the United States in the 1990s, where it is more commonly called boba, the drink gained popularity in the 2010 and became a symbol of Asian American cultural identity, including the terms "boba life" and "boba liberal".

There are ongoing debates over the drink's impact on health. While the drink most often contains green or black tea, which offers many health benefits, it also has a high sugar and caloric content, which could exacerbate chronic diseases consumed daily.

== Description ==
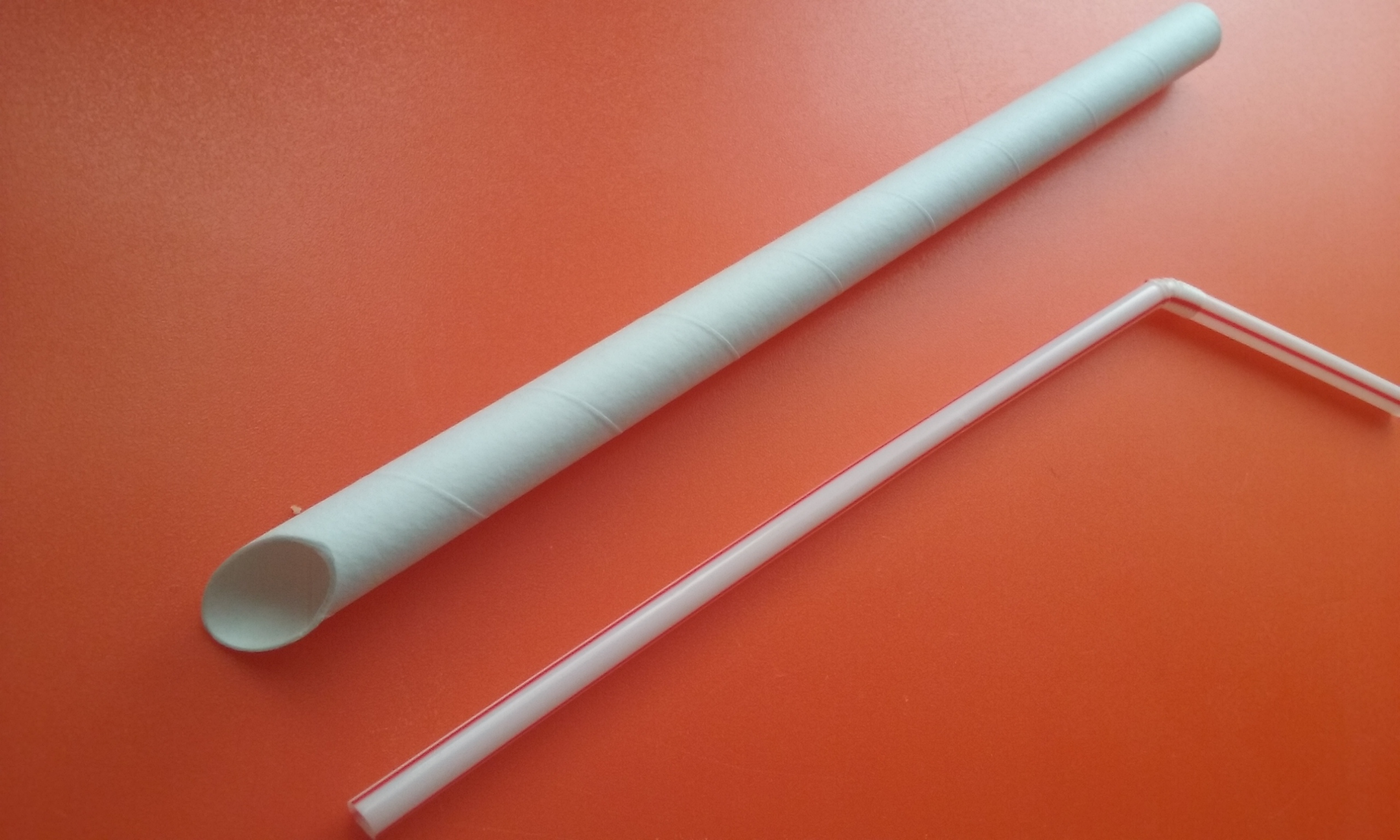
A paper straw for bubble tea compared to a more typical straw. The straw is thicker to let boba pearls pass through.

Bubble teas fall under two categories: fruit tea (teas without milk) and milk teas. Both varieties come with a choice of black, green, or oolong tea as the base. Milk teas usually include powdered or fresh milk, but may also use condensed milk, almond milk, soy milk, or coconut milk.

The oldest known bubble tea drink consisted of a mixture of hot Taiwanese black tea, tapioca balls (Chinese: 粉圓; pinyin: fěn yuán; Pe̍h-ōe-jī: hún-îⁿ; Tâi-lô: hún-înn), condensed milk, and syrup (Chinese: 糖漿; pinyin: táng jiāng) or honey. The tapioca pearls that give bubble tea its name were originally made from the starch of the cassava. The term "pearls" (Chinese: 珍珠; pinyin: zhēn zhū) quickly replaced former terms. The alternative name "boba" (Chinese: 波霸; pinyin: bō bà; Jyutping: bo1 baa3), common in the United States but rare in Asia, originates from a nickname for Hong Kong actress Amy Yip. Bubble tea is most commonly served cold.

There are select cafés that specialize in bubble tea production. Some of the largest global bubble tea chains include Chatime, CoCo Fresh Tea & Juice, Gong Cha, and Kung Fu Tea.

=== Variants ===
==== Drink ====
Bubble tea comes in many variations, which usually consist of black tea, green tea, oolong tea, and sometimes white tea. Another variation, yuenyeung, (Chinese: 鴛鴦, named after the Mandarin duck) originated in Hong Kong and consists of black tea, coffee, and milk.

Other varieties of the drink include blended tea drinks. These variations are often either blended using ice cream or are smoothies that contain both tea and fruit.

There are many popular flavors of bubble tea, such as taro, mango, coffee, and coconut. Flavoring ingredients such as a syrup or powder determine the flavor and usually the color of the bubble tea, while other ingredients such as tea, milk, and boba are the basis. Milkless teas commonly use fruit as their base, with popular options including fruit teas made from fresh fruit, fruit syrup, or fruit powder, often combined with a tea. Common flavors include mango, lychee, winter melon, and lemon.

==== Toppings ====
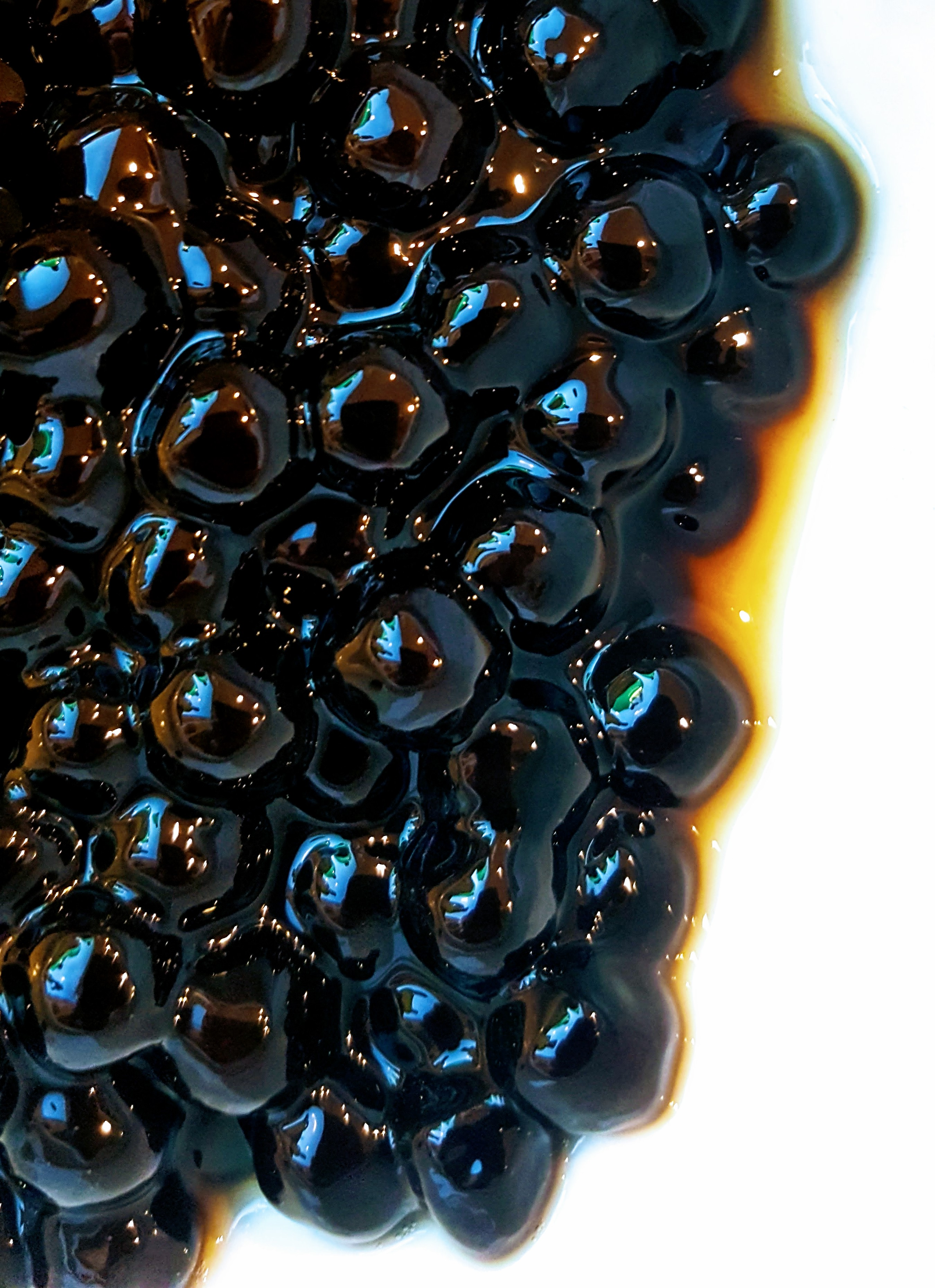
Tapioca pearls (boba)

Tapioca pearls (boba) are the most common ingredient, although there are other ways to make the chewy spheres found in bubble tea. The pearls vary in color according to the ingredients mixed in with the tapioca. Most pearls are black from brown sugar.

Jelly comes in different shapes: small cubes, stars, or rectangular strips, and flavors such as coconut jelly, konjac, lychee, grass jelly, mango, coffee, and green tea. Azuki bean or mung bean paste, typical toppings for Taiwanese shaved ice desserts, give bubble tea an added subtle flavor as well as texture. Aloe, egg pudding (custard), and sago also can be found in many bubble tea shops. Popping boba, or spheres that have fruit juices or syrups inside them, are another popular bubble tea topping. Flavors include mango, strawberry, coconut, kiwi, and honey melon.

Some shops offer milk or cheese foam on top of the drink, giving the drink a consistency similar to that of whipped cream and a saltier flavor profile. One shop described the effect of the cheese foam as "neutraliz[ing] the bitterness of the tea...and as you drink it you taste the returning sweetness of the tea."

==== Ice and sugar level ====
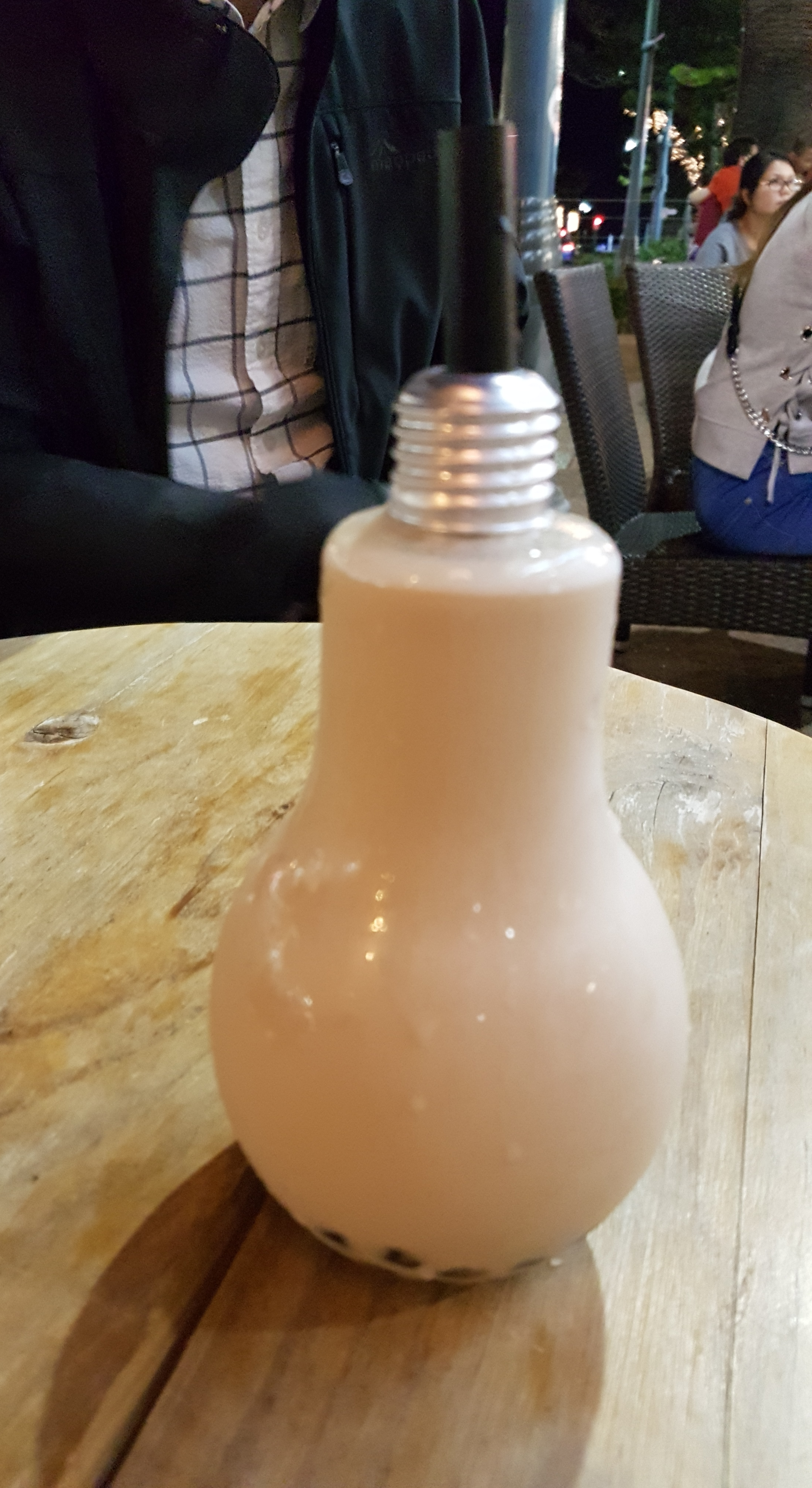
Bubble tea packaged in a promotional shape (lightbulb) instead of a takeaway cup

Bubble tea shops often give customers the option of choosing the amount of ice or sugar in their drink. Ice levels are usually specified (e.g., no ice, less ice, normal ice, more ice), and sugar levels in 25% increments (e.g., 0%, 25%, 50%, 75%, 100%), though these options vary by shop as there is no standardized recipe. Some shops also offer hot bubble tea as an alternative to the standard cold preparation.

==== "Boozy Boba" ====
In recent years, alcoholic variations of bubble tea, sometimes referred to as “boozy boba,” have emerged in bars and specialty beverage shops. These drinks typically combine traditional bubble tea ingredients such as milk tea or fruit tea with alcoholic spirits, including vodka, rum, or soju. Boozy boba has gained popularity among adult consumers and reflects the ongoing adaptation of bubble tea within global beverage trends. There is even a sparkling vodka seltzer with four different fruit flavors called "Boozy Boba."

==== Packaging ====
In Southeast Asia, bubble tea is usually packaged in a plastic takeaway cup, sealed with plastic or a rounded cap. New entrants into the market have attempted to distinguish their products by packaging it in bottles and other shapes. Some have used sealed plastic bags.

While some cafés may serve bubble tea in a glass, most Taiwanese bubble tea shops serve the drink in a plastic cup and use a machine to seal the top of the cup with heated plastic cellophane. The method allows the tea to be shaken in the serving cup and makes it spill-free until a person is ready to drink it. The cellophane is then pierced with an oversized straw, referred to as a boba straw, which is larger than a typical drinking straw to allow the toppings to pass through.

==== Preparation Method ====
The tea can be made in batches during the day or the night before. Brewing different types of teas takes different amounts of time and temperature. For instance, green tea requires brewing at a lower temperature, typically between 176–185 °F (80–85 °C) with a brewing time of 8–10 minutes to extract its optimal flavour. In contrast, black tea needs to be made with hotter water, usually around 203–212 °F (95–100 °C) with a brewing of around 15–20 minutes to bring out its sweetness. A tea warmer dispenser allows the tea to remain heated for up to eight hours.

Pearls (boba) are made from tapioca starch. Most bubble tea stores buy packaged tapioca pearls in an uncooked state. When the boba is uncooked and in the package, it is uncolored and hard. The boba does not turn chewy and dark until they are cooked and sugar is added to bring out its taste. Uncooked tapioca pearls in their package can be stored for around 9 to 12 months. Once cooked, they can be stored in a sealed container in the refrigerator. Despite this, most bubble tea stores will not sell their boba after 24 hours because it will start to harden and lose its chewiness.

The traditional preparation method is to mix the ingredients (sugar, powders, and other flavourings) together using a bubble tea shaker cup, by hand. However, many present-day bubble tea shops use a bubble tea shaker machine. This eliminates the need for humans to shake the bubble tea by hand. It also reduces staffing needs as multiple cups of bubble tea may be prepared by a single barista.

Related Products

Due to its popularity, bubble tea has inspired a variety of flavored snacks, such as Boba ice cream bars, bubble tea candy, popcorn, cookies, and jelly beans. The market size of bubble tea was valued at US$2.4 billion in 2022 and is projected to reach US$4.3 billion by the end of 2027.

== History ==
Milk and sugar have been added to tea in Taiwan since the Dutch colonization of Taiwan from 1624 to 1662, although it was not a common practice.

Before the invention of bubble tea, a similar tea beverage was created in Taiwan called bubble foam tea (Chinese: 泡沫紅茶; pinyin: Pàomò hóngchá). This drink was made by mixing tea with fructose syrup and then shaking it with ice cubes in a shaker. The vigorous shaking created a fine foam, giving the drink its signature texture. Unlike modern pearl milk tea, bubble foam tea did not initially contain tapioca balls.

There are two competing stories for the discovery of bubble tea. One is associated with the Chun Shui Tang tea room in Taichung. Its founder, Liu Han-Chieh, began serving Chinese tea cold after he observed coffee was served cold in Japan while on a visit in the 1980s. The new style of serving tea propelled his business, and multiple chains serving this tea were established. The company's product development manager, Lin Hsiu Hui, said she created the first bubble tea in 1988 when she poured tapioca balls into her tea during a staff meeting and encouraged others to drink it. The beverage was well-received at the meeting, leading to its inclusion on the menu. It ultimately became the franchise's top-selling product.

Another claim for the invention of bubble tea comes from the Hanlin Tea Room (Chinese: 翰林茶館; pinyin: Hànlín cháguǎn) in Tainan. It claims that bubble tea was invented in 1986 when teahouse owner Tu Tsong-he was inspired by white tapioca balls he saw in the local market of Yā-mǔ-liáo (Chinese: 鴨母寮). He later made tea using these traditional Taiwanese snacks. This resulted in what is known as "pearl tea".

In 2009, the two teahouses began legal proceedings against each other, each seeking recognition as the original creator of the drink. After roughly a decade of litigation, a Taiwanese court ruled in 2019 that bubble tea was not patentable subject matter, on the basis that it is a general food product that anyone may prepare. The ruling did not assign credit for the invention to either party.

== Popularity ==
In the 1990s, bubble tea spread across East and Southeast Asia with ever-growing popularity. In regions like Hong Kong, China, Japan, Vietnam, and Singapore, the bubble tea trend has expanded rapidly among young people. In some popular shops, people would line up for more than thirty minutes to get a drink. In recent years, the popularity of bubble tea has gone beyond the beverage itself, with boba lovers inventing various bubble tea flavored-foods, including ice cream, pizza, toast, sushi, and ramen.

=== Taiwan ===
In Taiwan, bubble tea has become not just a beverage, but an enduring icon of the culture and food history for the nation. In 2020, the date 30 April was officially declared as National Bubble Tea Day in Taiwan. That same year, the image of bubble tea was proposed as an alternative cover design for Taiwan's passport. According to Al Jazeera, bubble tea has become synonymous with Taiwan and is an important symbol of Taiwanese identity both domestically and internationally. Bubble tea is used to represent Taiwan in the context of the Milk Tea Alliance. 50 Lan is a bubble tea chain founded in Tainan.

=== Hong Kong ===
Hong Kong is famous for its traditional Hong Kong–style milk tea, which is made with brewed black tea and evaporated milk. While milk tea has long become integrated into people's daily lives, the expansion of Taiwanese bubble tea chains, including Tiger Sugar, Youiccha, and Xing Fu Tang, into Hong Kong created a new wave for "boba tea."

=== China ===
Since the idea of adding tapioca pearls into milk tea was introduced into China in the 1990s, bubble tea has increased in popularity. In 2020 it was estimated that the consumption of bubble tea was 5 times that of coffee in recent years. According to data from QianZhen Industry Research Institute, the value of the tea-related beverage market in China reached 53.7 billion Renminbi (about US$7.63 billion) in 2018. In 2019, annual sales from bubble tea shops reached as high as CN¥ 140.5 billion (roughly US$20 billion). While bubble tea chains from Taiwan (e.g., Gong Cha and Coco) are still popular, more local brands, like Yi Dian Dian, Nayuki, Hey Tea, etc., are now dominating the market.

In China, it is said that young people's growing obsession with bubble tea has shaped their way of social interaction. Buying someone a cup of bubble tea has become a new way of informally thanking someone. It is also a favored topic among friends and on social media. It is not uncommon for people to wait in lines of up to an hour at popular locations in order to take photos of their order. Boba tea as it has recently become a status symbol used to express a person's urban identity online.

=== Japan ===
Bubble tea first entered Japan in the late 1990s, but it failed to leave a lasting impression on the public markets. This is partly because the Japanese saw bubble tea as a hybrid between a dessert and drink because of the tapioca, and were unsure of how to market it. Moreover, two other desserts entered the market at the same time, and outshone bubble tea. Thus, it was not until the 2010s that the bubble tea trend finally swept Japan. Shops from Taiwan, Korea, and China, as well as local brands, began to pop up in cities, and bubble tea has remained one of the hottest trends since then. Bubble tea has become so commonplace among teenagers that teenage girls in Japan invented a slang for it: tapiru (タピる). The word is short for drinking tapioca tea in Japanese, and it won first place in a survey of "Japanese slang for middle school girls" in 2018. A bubble tea theme park was open for a limited time in 2019 in Harajuku, Tokyo.

=== Singapore ===
Known locally in Chinese as 泡泡茶 (pinyin: pào pào chá), bubble tea is loved by many in Singapore. The drink was sold in Singapore as early as 1992 and became phenomenally popular among young people in 2001. This soon ended because of the intense competition and price wars among shops. As a result, most bubble tea shops closed, and bubble tea lost its popularity by 2003. When Taiwanese chains like Koi and Gong Cha came to Singapore in 2007 and 2009, the beverage experienced only short resurgences in popularity. In 2018, interest in bubble tea rose again at an unprecedented speed in Singapore, as new brands like The Alley and Tiger Sugar entered the market; social media also played an important role in driving this renaissance of bubble tea.

=== Malaysia ===
Bubble tea was introduced to Malaysia in the late 1990s and saw a surge in popularity during the early 2000s, particularly in urban areas and night markets. The arrival of Taiwanese chains such as Chatime in 2010 marked a significant shift in the industry, as franchised outlets began appearing in major cities. By 2013, Malaysia accounted for around 50% of Chatime's global revenue.

In 2017, a high-profile legal dispute between Chatime's franchisor and its Malaysian licensee, Loob Holding, led to the rebranding of over 160 outlets as Tealive. Tealive has since become the leading homegrown bubble tea brand in Malaysia, with hundreds of outlets nationwide and regional expansion across Southeast Asia. Other international and local brands, such as Gong Cha, The Alley, and Chizu, also maintain a strong presence.

The Malaysian bubble tea market has experienced significant growth and popularity in recent years, becoming a prominent segment of the country's beverage industry. Bubble tea has evolved into a mainstream beverage preference among the populace, propelled by the influx of international franchises and the emergence of indigenous brands.

=== United States ===
Taiwanese immigrants introduced bubble tea to the United States in the 1990s, initially in California through regions including Los Angeles County. Some of the first stand-alone bubble tea shops can be traced to a food court in Arcadia, in Southern California, and Fantasia Coffee & Tea in Cupertino, in Northern California. Chains like Tapioca Express, Quickly, Lollicup, and Happy Lemon emerged in the late 1990s and early 2000s, bringing the Taiwanese bubble tea trend to the US. Within the Asian American community, bubble tea is commonly known under its colloquial term "boba."

As the beverage gained popularity in the US, it gradually became more than a drink, but a cultural identity for Asian Americans. This phenomenon was referred to as "boba life" by Chinese-American brothers Andrew and David Fung in their music video, "Bobalife," released in 2013. Boba symbolizes a subculture that Asian Americans as social minorities could define themselves as, and "boba life" is a reflection of their desire for both cultural and political recognition. It is also used disparagingly in the term boba liberal, a term coined in 2019 that derides mainstream Asian-American liberalism. Other regions with large concentrations of bubble tea restaurants in the United States are the Northeast and Southwest. This is reflected in the coffeehouse-style teahouse chains that originate from the regions, such as Boba Tea Company from Albuquerque, New Mexico, No. 1 Boba Tea in Las Vegas, Nevada, and Kung Fu Tea from New York City. Albuquerque and Las Vegas have a large concentrations of boba tea restaurants, as the drink is popular especially among the Hispano, Navajo, Pueblo, and other Native American, Hispanic and Latino American communities in the Southwest. Aside from the drink itself, boba tea stores have become more than just a business. Accompanying the "boba life" phenomenon, boba tea stores have transformed into a social space for Asian American students to form meaningful communities around. One source notes that the casual atmosphere within these stores allows people to break existing social barriers and connect over their shared identities.

Alongside American bubble tea chains, several large American coffeehouse chains have joined in on the growing popularity by adding bubble tea drinks and variants to their menus, often by first releasing them as seasonal summer drinks. Notable examples include Caribou Coffee in 2018, Dunkin' Donuts in 2021, and Starbucks in 2024.

A massive shipping and supply chain crisis on the US West coast, coupled with the obstruction of the Suez Canal in March 2021, caused a shortage of tapioca pearls for bubble tea shops in the US and Canada. Most of the tapioca consumed in the US is imported from Asia, since the critical ingredient, tapioca starch, is mostly grown in Asia.

TikTok trends and the Korean Wave also fueled the popularity of bubble tea in the United States.

=== Vietnam ===
Taiwanese milk tea was introduced to Vietnam in the early 2000s, but it took a few years for this drink to become popular with young people. Roadside stalls and carts rarely served milk tea, and the milk tea trend gradually cooled down in the late 2000s. Many shops had to liquidate or close, while others struggled to survive. Bubble tea also gained controversy because of information about tea of unknown origin, tapioca pearls allegedly being made from polymer plastics, etc.

By 2012, Taiwanese brands arrived in Vietnam, still the same old milk tea but served in a completely new style: milk tea with toppings, developing a chain model, and a space designed as well as any famous coffee shop. Also, the halo of Taiwanese milk tea gradually returned, especially around the end of 2016, to the beginning of 2017. According to a survey by Lozi, in 2017, the Vietnamese milk tea market witnessed an explosion with 100 large and small brands coexisting and over 1,500 points of sale, including major brands from Taiwan such as Ding Tea, Gong Cha, BoBaPop. This survey also shows that milk tea is becoming a popular drink in Vietnam, when 53% of people confirming to drink milk tea at least once a week.

From the consumer perspective, milk tea is characterized by its sweet, creamy taste, suitable for many customers including students, children and office workers. Milk tea is constantly "transforming" to meet all customer needs, from cheese cream tea, fruit tea to low-fat tea. Another important point that makes milk tea popular is the service style. Instead of small shops and school gate carts like in the past, the milk tea is designed into a spacious space, with fixed seats, and cool air conditioning.

=== Korea ===
Milk tea is not only a daily drink, but it has also become a "fever drink" loved in many countries, including South Korea. In the capital Seoul, there are four milk tea shop chains, which are popular places for entertainment, dating, and meeting of Korean youth every weekend, which are Gong Cha, Cofioca, Amasvin, and Happy Lemon.

Despite this, milk tea is not as popular in Korea as it is in other East Asian countries. Popular bubble tea stores such as Gong Cha and Tiger Sugar in Korea are losing customers partly because of cheaper, alternative drinks that have started to gain more traction. However, there has been a recent surge in Chinese milk tea brands such as Hey Tea, that may just repopularize milk tea in Korea with their marketing and promotion of use of high-quality ingredients.

In Korea, there are many different large and small milk tea shops, famous brands, or just small shops with a drink counter and a table. Although pearl milk tea originated in Taiwan, it underwent certain changes in Korea. When entering restaurants or bakeries in Korea, the calorie index is displayed as a way to protect the health of consumers. For example, at Gong Cha milk tea shops, customers can choose the sweetness of their milk tea by choosing the sugar level (0%, 30%, 50%, 70%, and 100%) and similarly choose ice to add their personal favorite flavor to their milk tea.

=== Australia ===
Individual bubble tea shops began to appear in Australia in the 1990s, along with other regional drinks like Eis Cendol. Chains of stores were established as early as 2002, when the Bubble Cup franchise opened its first store in Melbourne. Although originally associated with the rapid growth of immigration from Asia and the vast tertiary student cohort from Asia, in Melbourne and Sydney, bubble tea has become popular across many communities.

=== Mauritius ===
The first bubble tea shop in Mauritius opened in late 2012, and since then, there have been bubble tea shops in most shopping malls on the island. Bubble tea shops have become a popular place for teenagers to hang out.

=== United Kingdom ===
Bubble tea appeared in the UK sometime between the 2000s and 2010s, and began gaining traction in the United Kingdom through early adoption in Asian predominated areas such as Chinatown and Soho before expanding into the mainstream market. Entrepreneurs such as Assad Khan played a key role in its growth, launching dedicated bubble tea shops like Bubbleology in London in 2011 after encountering the drink abroad. Bubble tea is especially popular amongst students, who appreciate being able to customize the drink to suit their taste.

== Cultural influence ==
In 2020, the Unicode Consortium released the bubble tea emoji (U+1F9CB 🧋 BUBBLE TEA) as part of its version 13.0 update.

On 29 January 2023, Google celebrated bubble tea with a doodle.

== Potential health concerns ==
In July 2019, Singapore's Mount Alvernia Hospital warned against the high sugar content of bubble tea since the drink had become extremely popular in Singapore. While it acknowledged the benefits of drinking green tea and black tea in reducing risk of cardiovascular disease, diabetes, arthritis, and cancer, respectively, the hospital cautions that the addition of other ingredients like non-dairy creamer and toppings in the tea could raise the fat and sugar content of the tea and increase the risk of chronic diseases. Non-dairy creamer is a milk substitute that contains trans fat in the form of hydrogenated palm oil. The hospital warned that this oil has been strongly correlated with an increased risk of heart disease and stroke.

A 2016 study found that bubble tea drinks fit the US Dietary Guidelines definition of a Sweetened beverage (SSB), and warns against daily consumption as a singular 16-ounce drink exceeded the recommended amount of added sugar one should intake. The study raised concerns that the drink's high sugar content could worsen existing public health issues.

The other concern about bubble tea is its high calorie content, partially attributed to the high-carbohydrate tapioca pearls (Chinese: 珍珠; pinyin: zhēn zhū), which can make up to half the calorie-count in a 500 ml (18 imp fl oz; 17 US fl oz) serving of bubble tea.

== See also ==
- Chinese tea culture – Preparation and occasions of tea consumption in China
- Hong Kong tea culture – Regional tea culture
- List of Taiwanese inventions and discoveries
- Milk tea
- Taiwanese cuisine – Culinary traditions of Taiwan
- Taiwanese tea culture – Tea culture of Taiwan
- Q texture – Hokkien culinary term for the ideal texture of chewy foods
