= Booba (disambiguation) =

Booba (born 1976) is a French rapper.

Booba may also refer to:

- Booba (film), a 2001 Philippine comedy film
- Booba (TV series), a 2016 YouTube children's animated series from the United Kingdom
- Booba Barnes, (1936–1996), American guitarist and vocalist
- Booba Starr, Jamaican singer
- Ethel Booba (born 1976), Filipina TV personality, author, singer, and comedian

== See also ==
- Bouba (disambiguation)
- Boba (disambiguation)
- Boohbah
- Buba (disambiguation)
- Booby (disambiguation)
- Bouba/kiki effect
