= Tapioca =

Starch extracted from cassava roots

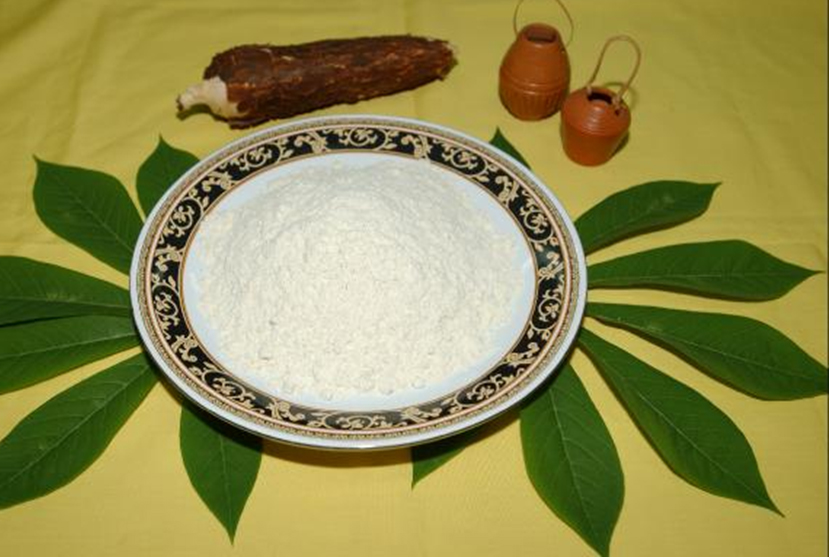
Tapioca starch

Tapioca (/ˌtæpiˈoʊkə/; Portuguese: [tapiˈɔkɐ]) is a starch extracted from the tubers of the cassava plant (Manihot esculenta, also known as manioc), a species native to the North and Northeast regions of Brazil, but which is now found in West Africa, Southeast Asia, and elsewhere. It is a perennial shrub adapted to the hot conditions of tropical lowlands. Cassava copes better with poor soils than many other food plants.

Tapioca is a staple food for millions of people in tropical countries. It provides only carbohydrate food value and is low in protein, vitamins, and minerals. In other countries, it is used as a thickening agent in various manufactured foods.

== Etymology ==
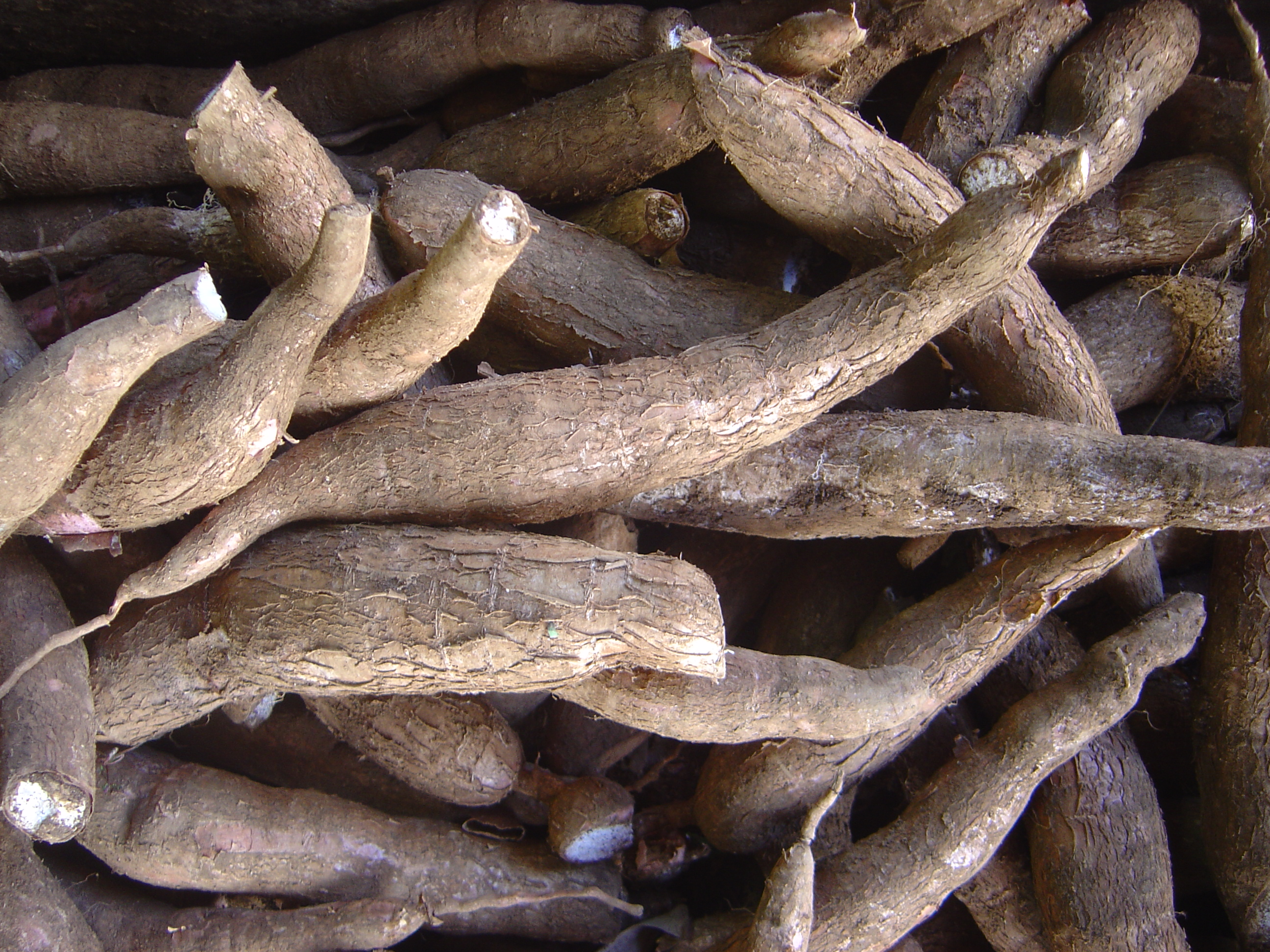
Cassava tubers

The word "tapioca" is derived from tipi'óka, its name in the Tupi language spoken by natives when the Portuguese first arrived in the Northeast Region of Brazil around 1500. This Tupi word is translated as "sediment" or "coagulant" and refers to the curd-like starch sediment that is obtained in the extraction process.

== Production ==
Cassava production

=== Establishment ===
The cassava plant is easily established by cutting, according to the NRCS: "Propagate cassava by planting segments of the stem. Cut stems into 9-30 cm lengths; be sure to include at least one node. Segments can be buried vertically with 8-15 cm in the ground. The selection of healthy, pest-free cuttings is essential. Stem cuttings are sometimes referred to as "stakes". In areas where freezing temperatures are possible, plant cuttings as soon as the danger of frost has passed. Cuttings can be planted by hand or by planting machines. Hand planting is done in one of three ways - vertical, flat below the soil surface, or tilted. Under low rainfall conditions, vertical planting may result in the desiccation of the cuttings, while in areas of higher rainfall, flat-planted cuttings may rot. In general, flat planting 5–10 cm below the soil surface is recommended in dry climates and when mechanical planting is used. Germination seems to be higher; tubers tend to originate from a great number of points and grow closer to the surface of the soil, making better use of fertilizers applied on the surface and also making harvesting easier."

The cassava plant can also be established from seed, although this is not advised, as seed germination rate is usually less than 50%. Because of this, seedlings are normally only used for breeding.

=== Management ===
Cassava cuttings start growing roots within just a few days, and new shoots sprout from where the old leaves were attached to the stem. At first, growth is slow, so keeping weeds under control during the early months is important.

Cassava grows best in light, sandy-loam or loamy-sand soils that are deep, fertile, and retain moisture. It can also be cultivated successfully in a wide range of soils, from sandy to clayey textures, and in areas with relatively low soil fertility. Cassava is capable of producing economic yields on land that has been depleted by repeated cultivation and is unsuitable for most other crops. The crop generally performs well as long as the soil is friable enough to allow the tubers to expand properly.

When cassava is cultivated on newly cleared forest land, little preparation beyond clearing existing vegetation is required. When grown after other crops, cassava can often be planted immediately following harvest, although in some cases, the soil is plowed two or three times to remove grass and weeds.

Fertilization is generally unnecessary on newly cleared land or when sufficient land is available for rotational cultivation. Cassava, though, is a fast-growing crop that depletes soil nutrients rapidly. Continuous cultivation without nutrient replacement can result in declining soil fertility. Commercial producers often restore soil nutrients through the application of synthetic fertilizers, while smallholder farmers commonly use organic manures such as cattle dung, duck manure, or composted household waste to maintain soil productivity.

=== Harvest ===
Cassava does not have a clearly defined stage of maturity and can be harvested whenever the storage roots reach a desirable size for consumption or processing. For food use, harvesting generally occurs between 8 and 12 months after planting. In most tropical regions, cassava can be harvested about eight months after planting, though under less favorable conditions, such as cooler or drier climates, 18 months or more may be needed to reach harvestable size. Cassava plants may remain unharvested for more than one growing season, allowing the roots to enlarge further, but older roots often become fibrous and woody, reducing their edibility and starch content.

Harvesting is usually performed manually by loosening the soil and pulling up the roots, although mechanical harvesting may be used in commercial operations. Under optimal conditions, yields of fresh roots can reach up to 90 tonnes per hectare, while global averages, largely from smallholder systems, are around 10 tonnes per hectare.

=== Preparation ===
The cassava plant has either red or green branches with blue spindles on them. The root of the green-branched variant requires treatment to remove linamarin, a cyanogenic glycoside occurring naturally in the plant, which otherwise may be converted into cyanide. Konzo (also called mantakassa) is a paralytic disease associated with several weeks of almost exclusive consumption of insufficiently processed bitter cassava.

In Brazil's north and northeast, traditional community-based tapioca production is a byproduct of manioc flour production from cassava roots. In this process, the manioc (after treatment to remove toxicity) is ground to a pulp with a small hand- or diesel-powered mill. This masa is then squeezed to dry it out. The wet masa is placed in a long, woven tube called a tipiti. The top of the tube is secured, while a large branch or lever is inserted into a loop at the bottom and used to stretch the entire implement vertically, squeezing a starch-rich liquid out through the weave and ends. This liquid is collected, and the microscopic starch grains in it are allowed to settle into the bottom of the container. The supernatant liquid is then poured off, leaving behind a wet starch sediment that needs to be dried and results in the fine-grained tapioca starch powder similar in appearance to corn starch.

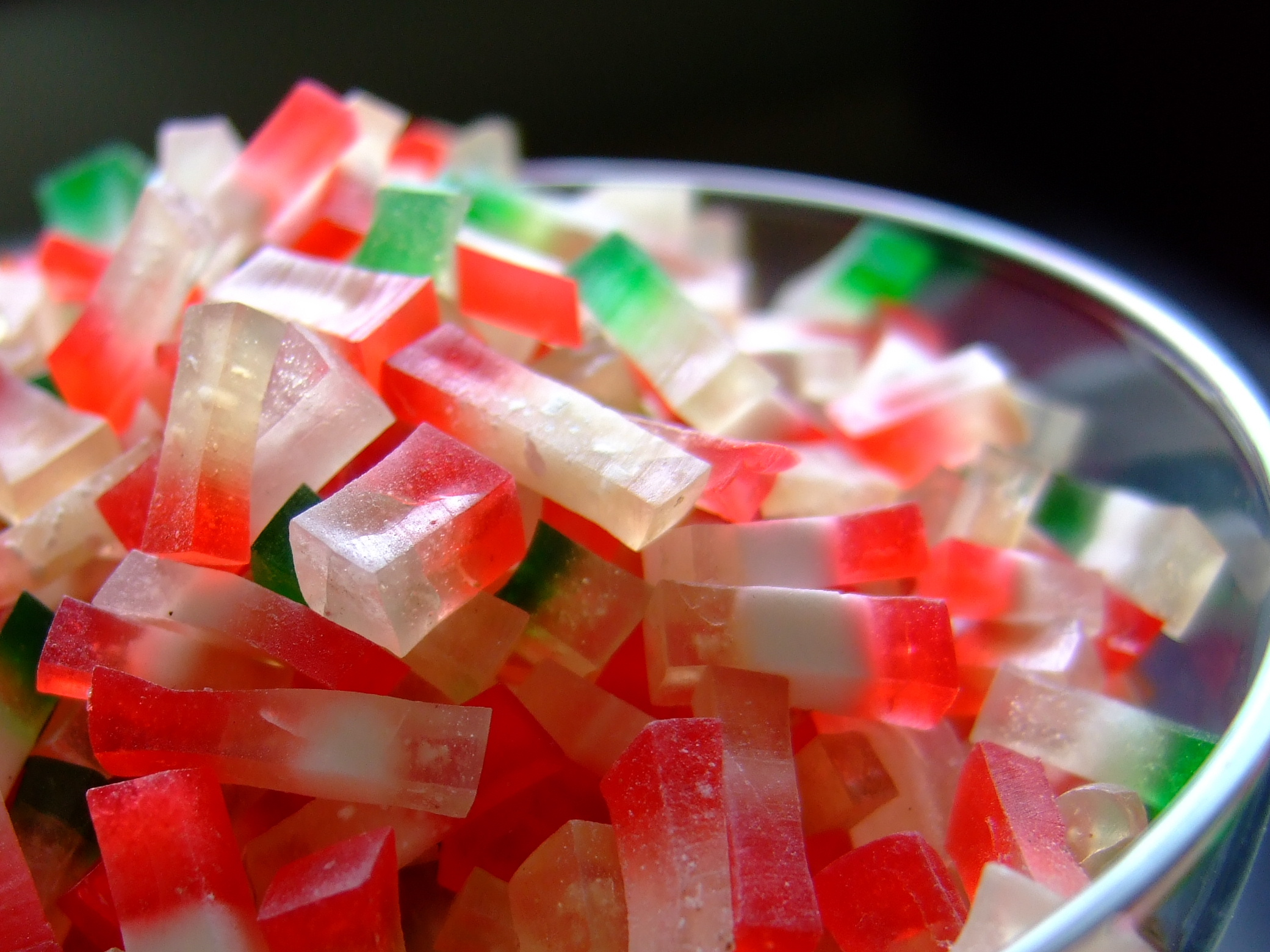
Colored, translucent tapioca sticks

Commercially, the starch is processed into several forms - hot soluble powder, meal, cooked fine or coarse flakes, rectangular sticks, and spherical "pearls". Pearls are the most widely available shape; sizes range from about 1–8 mm in diameter, with 2–3 mm being the most common.

Flakes, sticks, and pearls must be soaked well before cooking to rehydrate, absorbing water up to twice their volume. After rehydration, tapioca products become leathery and swollen. Processed tapioca is usually white, but sticks and pearls may be colored. Traditionally, the most common color applied to tapioca has been brown, but recently pastel colors have been available. Tapioca pearls are generally opaque when raw, but become translucent when cooked in boiling water.

Brazil, Thailand, and Nigeria are the world's largest cassava producers. In 2010, Thailand accounted for about 60% of worldwide exports.

=== Storage ===
When roots are sold to processing factories, they must be processed within 24 hours of harvest to ensure raw material freshness and prevent microbial growth. This would be observed as brown-black discolorations in a freshly broken root.

All process water streams contain some amount of sulfur dioxide to control the growth of microbes. Dried starch provides a shelf-stable product. For example, uncooked, dried tapioca pearls have at least a 2-year shelf life, whereas freshly cooked pearls may last 10 days in the refrigerator. This difference is attributed to the water activity difference between the dried and wet product, the latter introducing a much more favorable condition for microbes to grow.

=== Environmental issues ===
The main issue with tapioca is the large amount of water needed to produce it. One factory reports that it uses around 60 m^{3} for one ton of tapioca starch just in the first step of processing. With this much water being used, properly disposing of the wastewater is a priority. Cassava contains cyanide, and depending on whether the tapioca is made for human consumption or industrial purposes, cyanide levels vary. The wastewater used to process the tapioca contains this cyanide and if the wastewater is leaked into bodies of water containing aquatic life, due to the contaminated water's low pH, a detrimental effect occurs on fish and possibly other animals that live in or near the polluted water. Water pollution from tapioca manufacturing has been a problem in many countries in Southeast Asia.

A typical Indonesian tapioca factory in 2011 produces wastewater with three times the allowed amount of cyanides. The bigger issues relative to regulatory limits are the total suspended solids, biochemical oxygen demand, and chemical oxygen demand values. As a result, the main proposed treatment methods include anaerobic digestion (producing methane-rich biogas), as fertilizer, and possible future reuse of the starch within. (An aerobic treatment system has been successfully run in Thailand in 2004.) As of 2023, the technology to recycle the suspended starch granules in tapioca starch wastewater has become mature enough under the name of "liquid sugar". It is expected to create more value compared to biogas.

== Uses ==
=== Nutrition ===
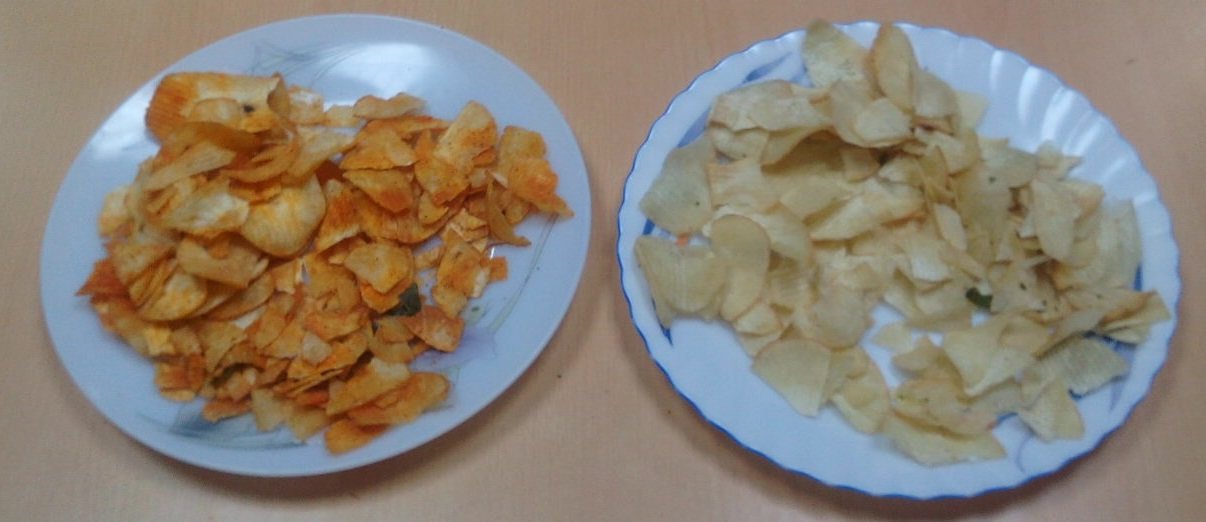
Spicy and non-spicy tapioca chips

Dried tapioca pearls are 11% water and 89% carbohydrates, with no protein or fat. In a 100-gram reference amount, dried tapioca supplies 358 calories and no or only trace amounts of dietary minerals and vitamins.

=== Flatbreads ===
A casabe is a thin flatbread made from bitter cassava root without leavening. It was originally produced by the indigenous Arawak and Carib peoples because these roots were a common plant of the rain forests where they lived. In eastern Venezuela, many indigenous groups still make casabe. It is their chief bread-like staple. Indigenous communities, such as the Ye-Kuana, Kari-Ña, Yanomami, Guarao or Warao descended from the Caribe or Arawac nations, still make casabe.

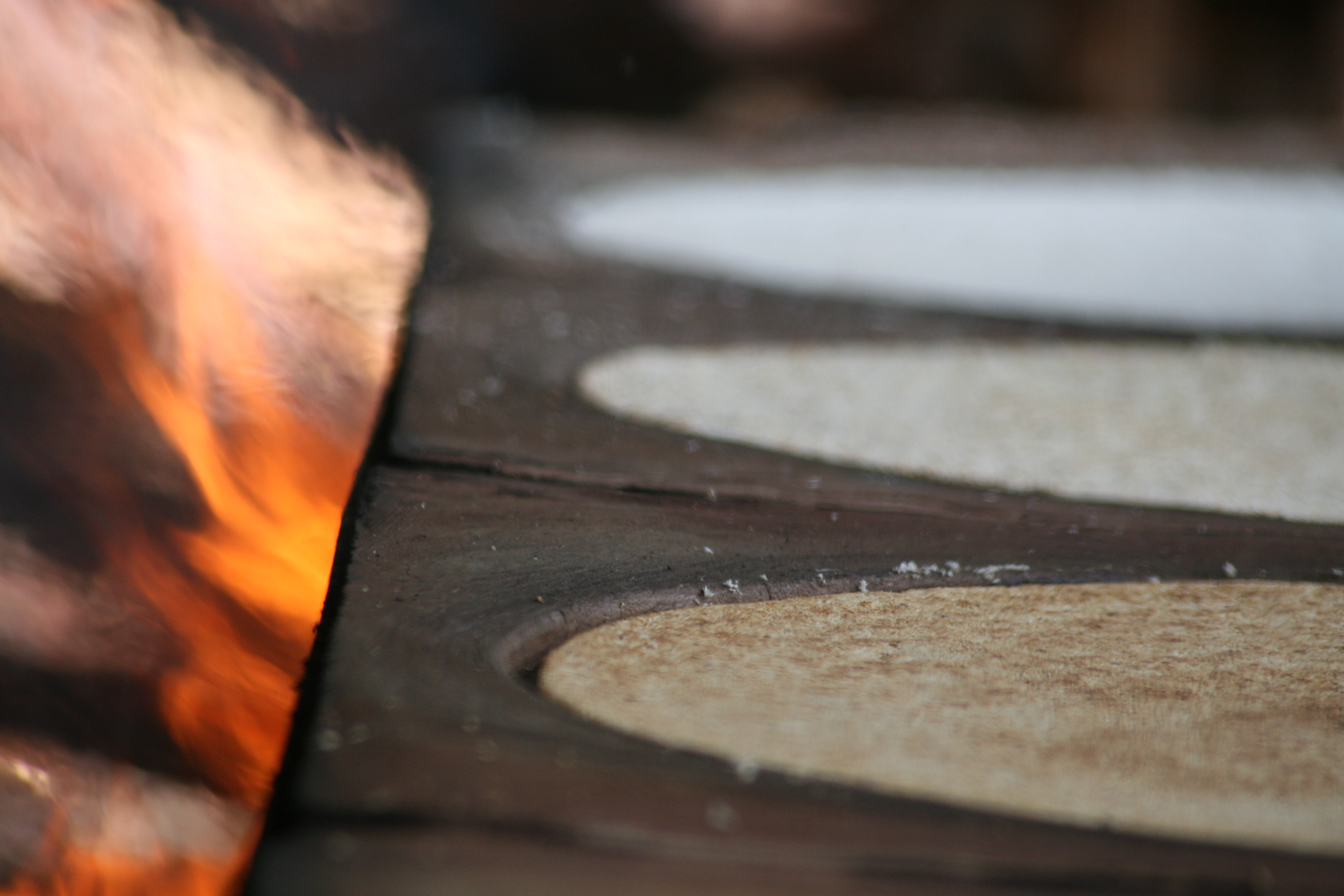
Casabe baking in a small commercial bakery

To make casabe, the starchy root of bitter cassava is ground to a pulp, then squeezed to expel a milky, bitter liquid called yare. This carries the poisonous substances with it out of the pulp. Traditionally, this squeezing is done in a sebucan, an 8–12-foot (2.4–3.7 m) long, tube-shaped, pressure strainer, woven in a characteristic helical pattern from palm leaves. The sebucan usually is hung from a tree branch or ceiling pole, and it has a closed bottom with a loop that is attached to a fixed stick or lever, which is used to stretch the sebucan. When the lever is pushed down, stretching the sebucan, the helical weaving pattern causes the strainer to squeeze the pulp inside. This is similar to the action of a Chinese finger trap. The pulp is spread in thin, round cakes about 2 feet (0.61 m) in diameter on a budare to roast or toast.

Thin and crisp cakes of casabe are often broken apart and eaten like crackers. Like bread, casabe can be eaten alone or with other dishes. Thicker casabe usually is eaten slightly moistened. A sprinkle of a few drops of liquid is enough to transform a dry casabe into soft, smooth bread.

=== Tapioca pearls ===
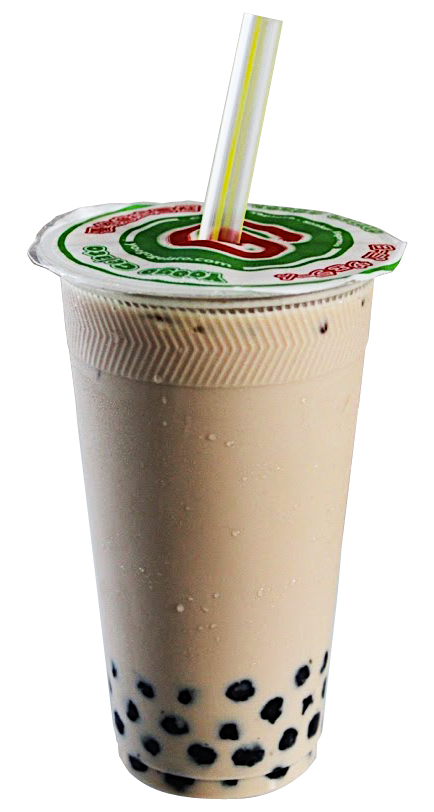
Bubble milk tea with tapioca pearls

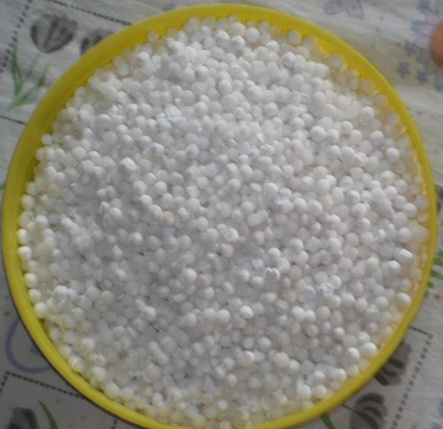
Sabudana

Tapioca pearls, also known as boba in East Asia, are produced by passing the moist starch through a sieve under pressure. Pearl tapioca is a common ingredient in Asian desserts such as falooda, kolak, sago soup, and in sweet drinks such as bubble tea, fruit slush and taho, where they provide a chewy contrast to the sweetness and smooth texture of the drink. Small pearls are preferred for use in puddings. Large pearls are preferred for use in drinks. These pearls most often are brown, not white, due to the sugar added and are traditionally used in black or green tea drinks. They are used as various colors in shave ice and hot drinks. In addition to their use in puddings and beverages, tapioca pearls may be used in cakes.

The pearls are known as sābudānā in the Indian subcontinent; they are used for sweet and savory dishes, such as sabudana khichri. In Brazil, the pearls are cooked with wine or other liquid to add flavor and are called sagu.

==== Processing and properties ====
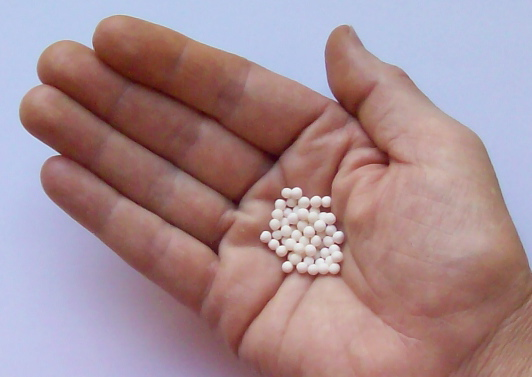
Small, opaque pearl tapioca before soaking

Processing of the cassava flour into tapioca pearls requires the intermediate step of a product called tapioca grit. Tapioca grit is dried cassava flour that is partially gelatinized so that it looks like flakes or irregularly-shaped granules.

In contrast, making starch pearls uses a different process of roasting. To form the pearls, the tapioca grit can be cut or extruded into the shape of pearls, either small (3 millimeters (0.12 in)) or large (6–8 millimeters (0.24–0.31 in)). The pearls are subjected to a form of heat-moisture treatment, which can extend shelf life up to 2 years.

Tapioca pearls have many unique properties that contribute to texture and mouth feel. Many of these physical properties are a result of its starch composition and are significantly affected by processing. Tapioca pearls are characteristically soft and chewy, with a prominent elastic texture and translucent appearance.

=== South America ===
In Colombia and Venezuela, arepas may be made with tapioca flour rather than cornmeal. Tapioca arepas probably predate cornmeal arepas; among traditional cultures of the Caribbean, the name for them is casabe. Throughout both Spanish and Portuguese South America, the tapioca, or yuca, starch is used to make regional variations of the baked cheese bun, known locally as pandebono, pan de yuca, pão de queijo, chipá, or cuñapé, among other names.

The whole, unprocessed cassava root also has several culinary uses throughout South America.

==== Brazil ====
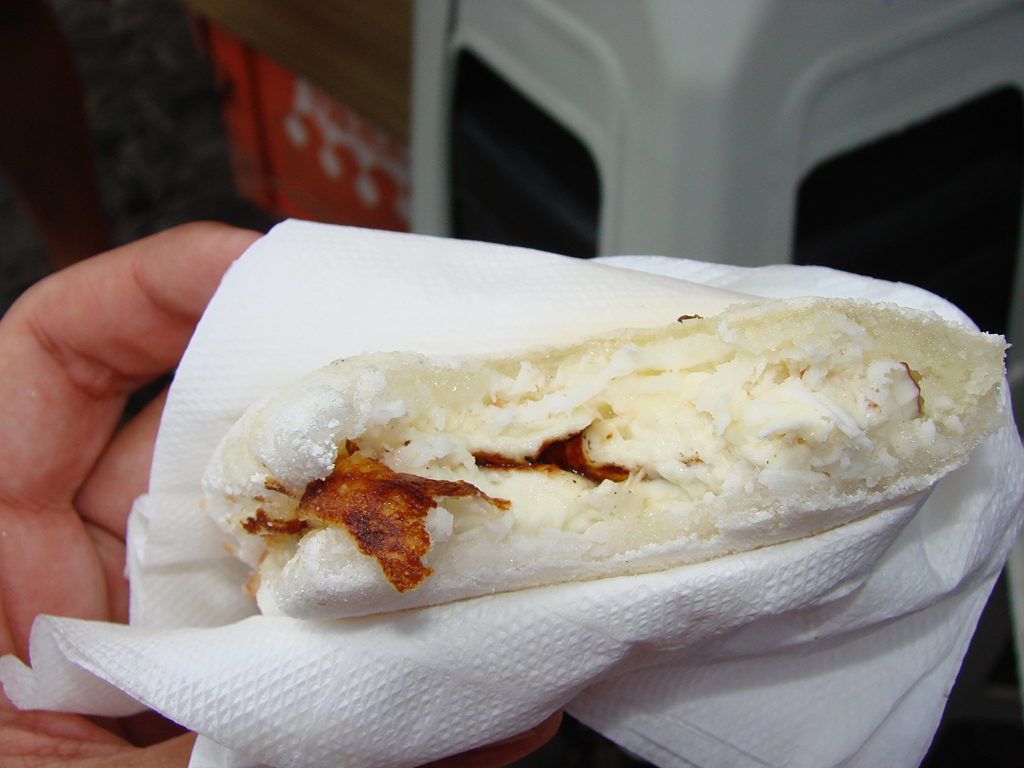
Beiju, Brazilian tapioca flatbread of Alto da Sé, in Olinda, Pernambuco.

In Brazilian cuisine, tapioca is used in making many foods. In beiju (or biju), also simply called "tapioca," the tapioca is moistened, strained through a sieve to become a coarse flour, then sprinkled onto a hot griddle or pan, where the heat makes the moist grains fuse into a flatbread which resembles a pancake or crepe. Then it may be buttered and eaten like toast (its most common use as a breakfast dish), or it may be filled with savory or sweet fillings, which define the kind of meal the tapioca is used for: breakfast/dinner or dessert. Fillings include butter, cheese, ham, bacon, vegetables, various kinds of meat, chocolate, fruits such as ground coconut, condensed milk, chocolate with slices of banana or strawberry, Nutella and cinnamon. This dish is usually served warm.

A regional dessert called sagu is also made in Southern Brazil from tapioca pearls traditionally cooked with cinnamon and cloves in red wine, although other fruit flavors may be used. The cassava root is known by different names throughout the country: mandioca in the North, Central-West, and São Paulo; macaxeira in the Northeast; aipim in the Southeast and South.

The fine-grained tapioca starch is called polvilho, and it is classified as either "sweet" or "sour." Sour polvilho is commonly used in dishes such as pão de queijo or "cheese bread," in which the starch is mixed with a hard cheese, usually matured Minas cheese (could be substituted by Parmesan cheese), eggs and butter and baked in the oven. The final result is an aromatic, chewy, and often crusty kind of bread that is ubiquitous across the country. Sweet polvilho is commonly used in cookies or cakes.

=== North America ===
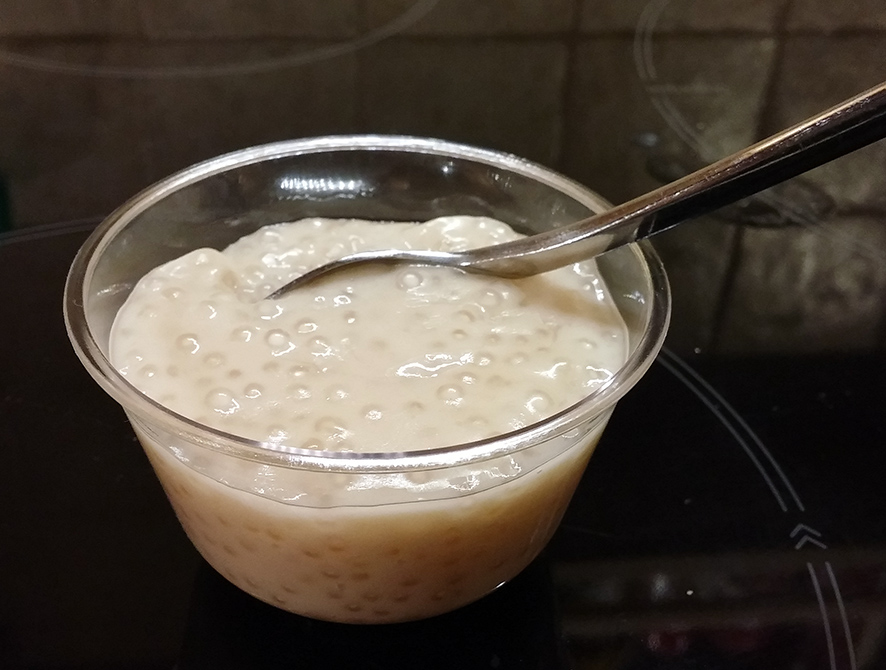
Tapioca pudding

While frequently associated with tapioca pudding, a dessert in the United States, tapioca has other uses. People on gluten-free diets can eat bread made with tapioca flour (although some tapioca flour has wheat added to it). Tapioca syrup is sometimes added as a sweetener to a wide variety of foods and beverages as an alternative to sucrose or corn syrup.

=== West Indies ===
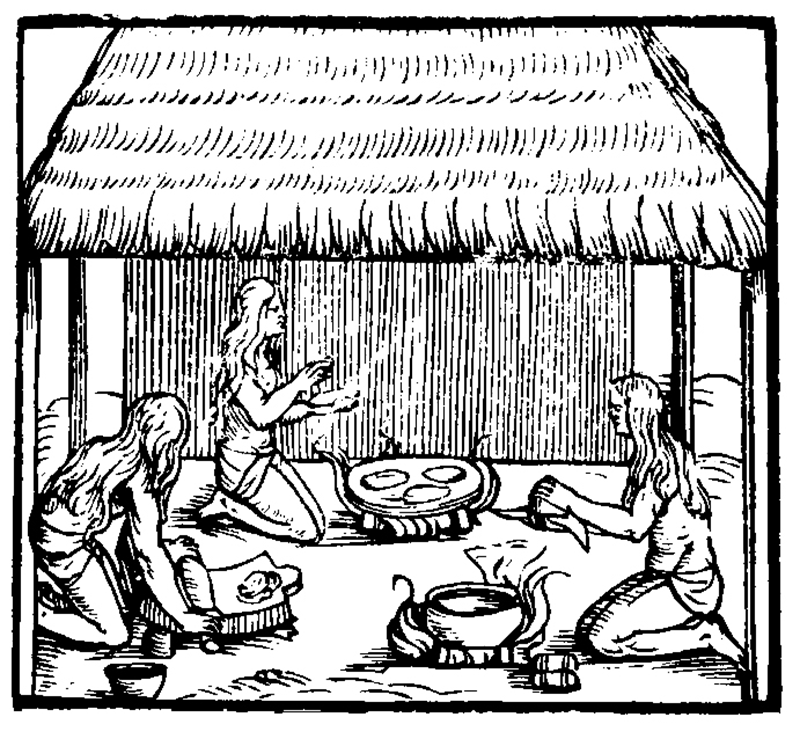
Taíno women preparing cassava bread in 1565: grating yuca roots into a paste, shaping the bread, and cooking it on a fire-heated burén

Tapioca is a staple food from which dishes such as pepper pot as well as alcohol are made. It may be used to clean the teeth, as a foodstuff cooked with meats or fish, and in desserts such as cassava pone.

Specifically in rural Cuba early in Spanish rule, tapioca's popularity grew because it was easy to cultivate the crop and to transport it to nearby Spanish settlements, eventually influencing the way land and people were divided in that early imperial era.

=== Asia ===
In various Asian countries, tapioca pearls are widely used in desserts and drinks including Taiwanese bubble tea.

==== Southeast Asia ====
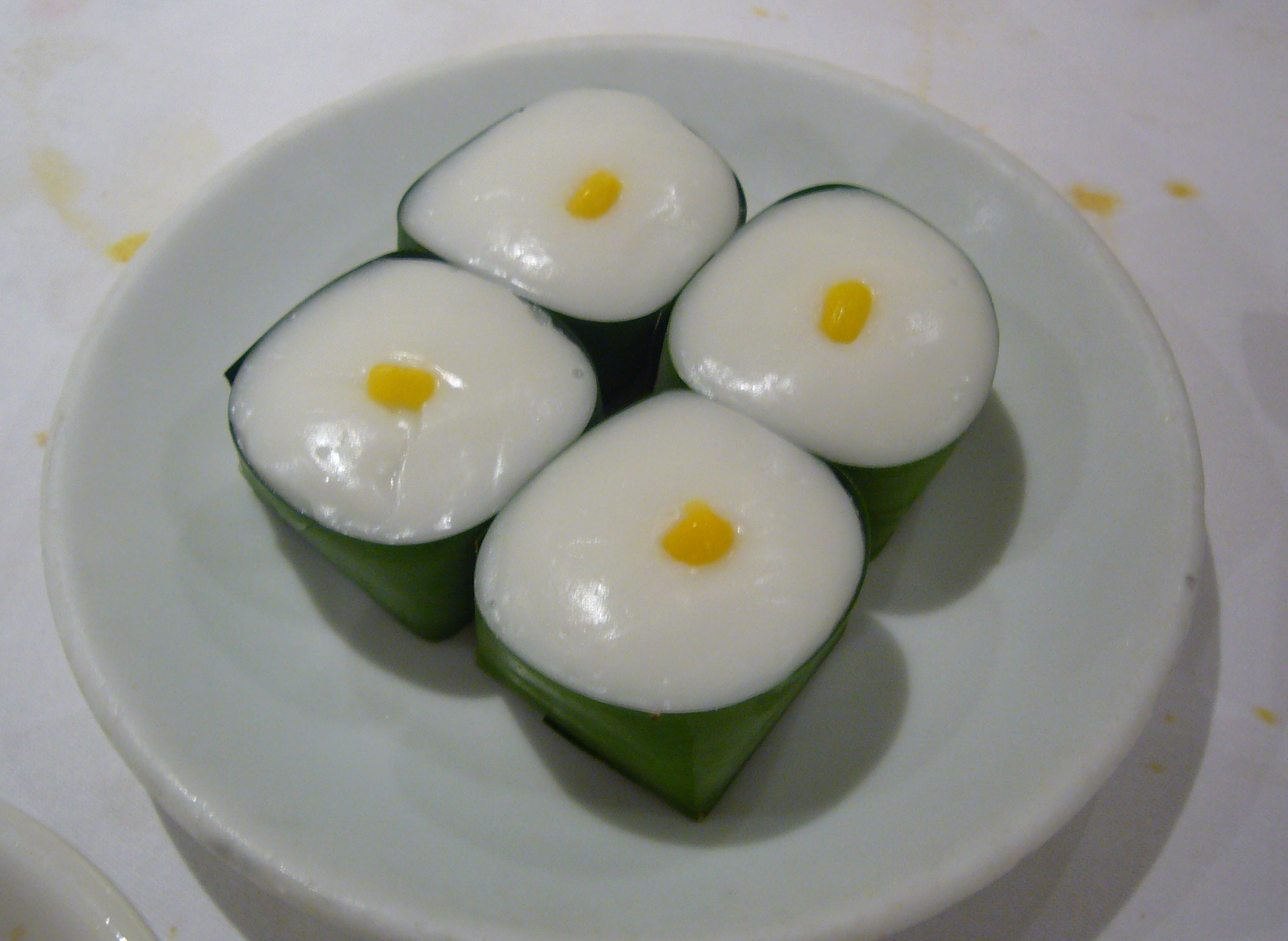
Thai tapioca pudding

In Southeast Asia, the cassava root is commonly cut into slices, wedges or strips, fried, and served as tapioca chips, similar to potato chips, wedges or french fries. Another method is to boil large blocks until soft and serve them with grated coconut as a dessert, either slightly salted or sweetened, usually with palm sugar syrup. In Thailand, this dish is called mansampalang (มันสำปะหลัง).

Commercially prepared tapioca has many uses. Tapioca powder is commonly used as a thickener for soups and other liquid foods. It is also used as a binder in pharmaceutical tablets and natural paints. The flour is used to make tender breads, cakes, biscuits, cookies, and other delicacies. Tapioca flakes are used to thicken the filling of pies made with fruits having a high water content.

A typical recipe for tapioca jelly can be made by washing two tablespoonfuls of tapioca, pouring a pint of water over it, and soaking it for three hours. The mixture is placed over low heat and simmered until quite clear. If too thick, a little boiling water can be added. It can be sweetened with white sugar, flavored with coconut milk or a little wine, and eaten alone or with cream.

===== Indonesia =====
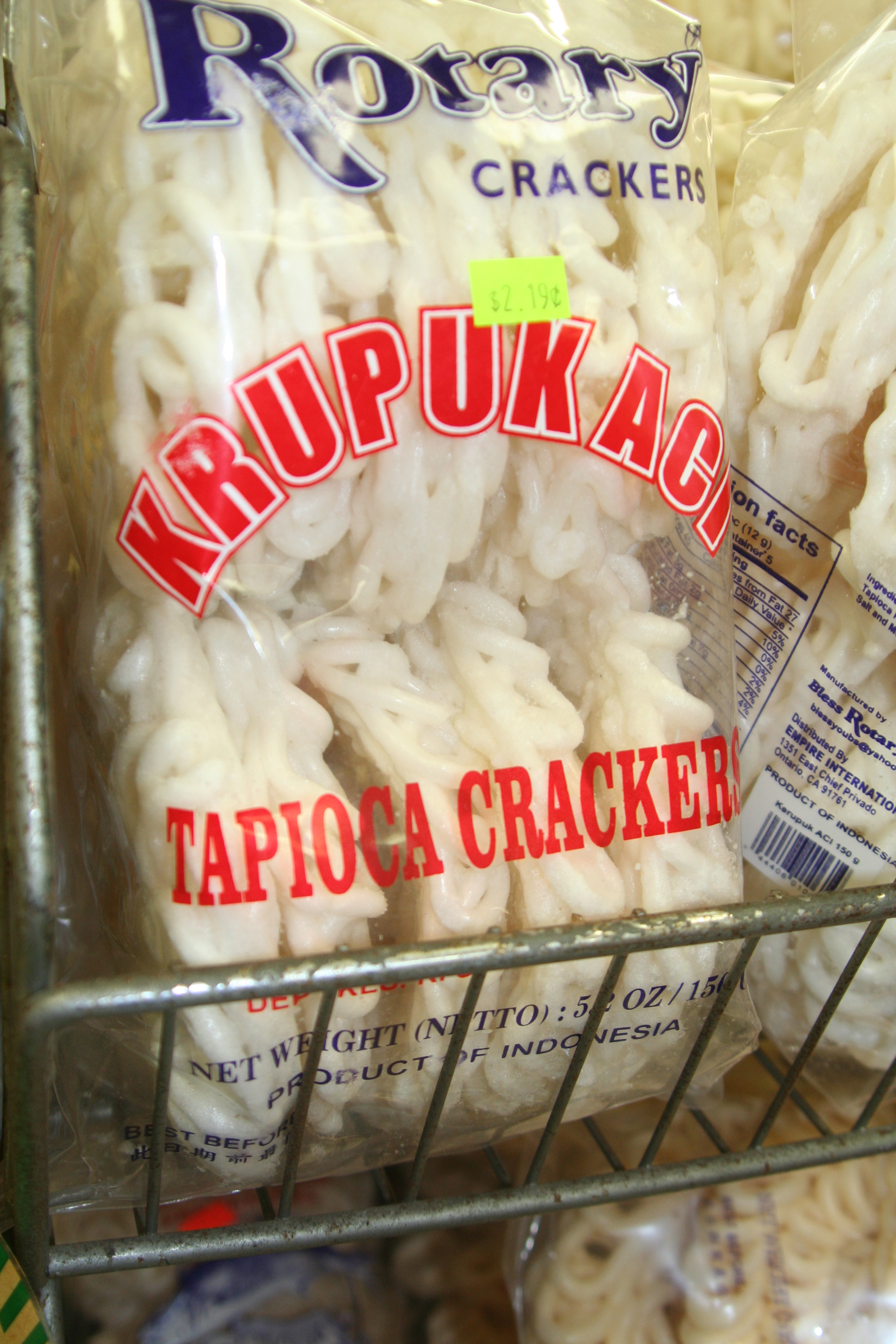
Tapioca crackers from Indonesia sold in a Los Angeles, California market

Krupuk, or traditional Indonesian crackers, is a significant use of tapioca starch in Indonesia. The most common krupuk is kerupuk kampung or kerupuk aci made of tapioca starch. The tapioca starch might be flavored with minced shrimp as krupuk udang (prawn cracker) or krupuk ikan (fish cracker). The thinly sliced or sometimes quite thick cassava was also sun-dried and deep fried to be made as kripik singkong crackers (cassava chips or tapioca chips). A variant of hot and spicy kripik singkong coated with sugar and chili pepper is known as kripik balado or keripik sanjay, a specialty of Bukittinggi city in West Sumatra.

Cilok is a tapioca dumpling snack. Tapai is made by fermenting large blocks with a yeast-like bacteria culture to produce a sweet and slightly alcoholic dessert. Further fermentation releases more liquids and alcohol, producing Tuak, a sour alcoholic beverage.

===== Malaysia =====
A variation of the chips popular amongst the Malays is kerepek pedas, where the crisps are coated with a hot, sweet, and tangy chili and onion paste, or sambal, usually with fried anchovies and peanuts added.

The cultivation of the plant is also extensively present in the Malay Peninsula, where in the hands of the Chinese, cassava tubers weighing from 4–13 kilograms (8.8–28.7 lb) are first scraped and then washed carefully. By being passed between rollers, they are reduced to a pulp which is again carefully washed, then shaken up with water. This causes the fecula to separate and pass through a very fine sieve, resulting in flour. The flour is repeatedly washed and then placed on mats to bleach via sun exposure and air. Different applications may be applied here to give rise to the popular and loved tapioca pearls in bubble tea beverages, also known as boba. The pearl tapioca is achieved by placing the flour in a cradle-shaped frame covered with canvas, where it's slightly moistened and rotated to be granulated. Finally, it is dried in the sun, then over the fire in a greased iron pan, and ready for the market.

=== South Asia ===
In South Asia, tapioca pearls are known as sagudana, sabudana or shabudana (pearl sago) or sabba akki (in Kannada). The pearls are used to make snacks.

==== Bangladesh ====
Sagudana is sometimes used in dessert dishes. Faluda, a popular food, is also prepared with curd, ice, and other ingredients during summer.

==== India ====
Tapioca pearls are a common ingredient of traditional Indian dishes such as kheer.

Tapioca pearls are used to make Sabudana khichdi, pakoda, paratha in Maharashtra, which is commonly eaten during vrat (fasting). Indians generally soak it overnight or 6–8 hours before cooking.

Cassava is referred to as Tapioca in Indian English usage. Cassava is called kappa or maracheeni in Malayalam.

It was introduced in 1880–1885 AD by the then Maharaja of Travancore, Vishakham Thirunal Rama Varma after a great famine hit the kingdom, as a substitute for rice.

Tapioca is widely consumed across Kerala as a breakfast dish or staple food, primarily prepared in two traditional ways. The first is chendan kappa, where tapioca is skinned, cut into large pieces of about 6 to 8 cm (2.4 to 3.1 in) long or into small 2 cm (0.79 in) cubes, boiled in water until adequately cooked, and served alongside a spicy crushed chutney. This chutney is traditionally made from Kanthari chilli (bird's eye chilli), shallots, salt, and coconut oil. The second popular preparation is kappa puzhukku or kappa vevichathu, where boiled tapioca is mashed and seasoned with a mixture of ground coconut, turmeric, and spices, then tempered with mustard seeds, shallots, and curry leaves. This mashed tapioca is famously paired with meat or fish curry, especially sardines, or served with moru (spiced buttermilk). Another popular combination is mashed tapioca with dried salted sardines directly cooked on charcoal and green chili.

Tapioca can be stored for extended periods by parboiling, drying it after skinning, and slicing it into 0.5 cm thick pieces. This is called unakka kappa (dried tapioca). Tapioca chips, thinly sliced tapioca wafers, similar to potato chips, are also extremely popular.

In Tamil, the roots of tapioca are called maravalli kizhangu and are used to prepare chips. Tapioca pearls are referred to as "javvarisi" in Tamil. Most of the delicacies are cooked from this form of tapioca because it is easier to handle than the raw root itself. Tapioca is cultivated more in several districts, providing steady income to farmers in Tamil Nadu. Tapioca can be consumed raw (after removing the skins/outer cover) or boiled for various dishes or snacks.

In Nagaland and Mizoram in Northeast India, tapioca is eaten as a snack. It is usually boiled with a bit of salt in water after skinning it, or snacks are made by drying the tapioca after cutting it. It is then powdered into flour and turned into dough to either make a fired or baked biscuit. In their local dialect, they call it kuri aloo, meaning "wood potato." All groups of society eat these chips as a delicacy. The skin of the tapioca, which is not edible for humans, is kept aside to prepare food for domesticated pigs.

In Assam, sabudana is also used as a substitute diet for boiled rice (bhaat) for the sick, elderly, or infirm for easy digestion and strength.

==== Sri Lanka ====
It is known as "mangnokka" in Sri Lanka, as well as by its Sinhalese and Tamil names. It is generally eaten boiled with a chili onion mixture called "lunu miris sambol" (a type of salsa) or coconut sambal. Another popular cassava dish is a curry cooked in coconut milk with a splash of turmeric. At the same time, it is popular to have tapioca pearls prepared as a delicacy. At one time, tapioca pearls were used to starch clothes by boiling tapioca pearls with the clothes. Spiced cassava chips are a popular snack usually sold by street vendors and street-side shops.

=== Africa ===
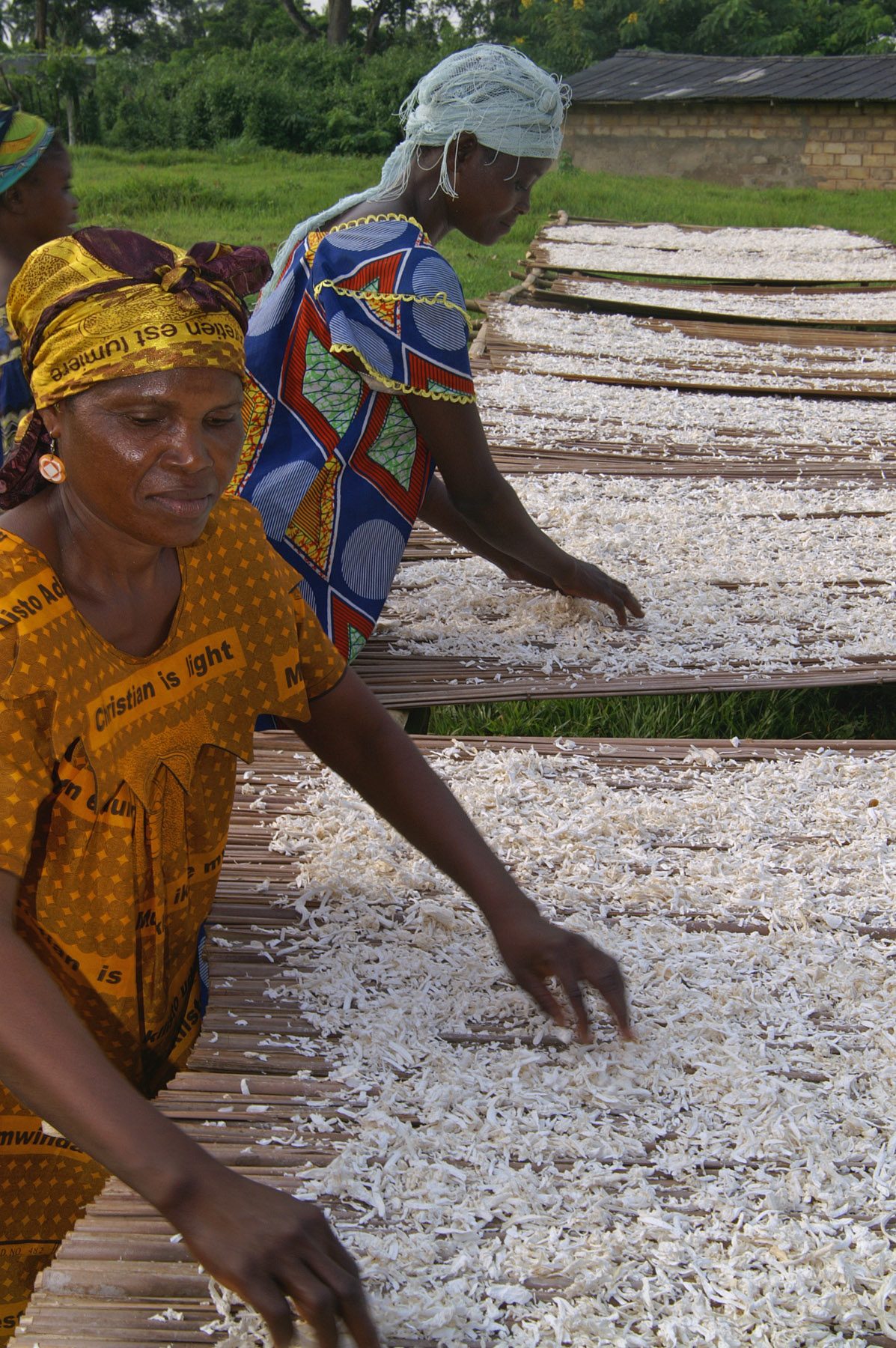
Drying cassava chips in Congo

Tapioca is eaten in the regions of Nigeria and Ghana as a common meal, usually at breakfast. Cassava is a staple food in West Africa, where it is widely eaten. In Nigeria, cassava is grated and dry roasted into garri; this is consumed by adding water, sugar, and/or peanuts accompanied by meat or smoked fish. Garri is also made into eba by adding hot water; this is eaten with stew or soup. Among the Yorubas, the Ijebu people of Nigeria make a cold water variant of eba by pounding the mixture with their fist until it becomes homogeneous; this is called feshelu. The Egbas of Abeokuta, Ogun State peel, dry, and grind cassava into a powder called elubo, which is then made into amala paki and eaten with a jute leaf stew called ewedu.

In Lagos, cassava is processed into tapioca which is cooked in coconut milk and sugar; this can be eaten as a breakfast meal or as a dessert at parties or dinner. This is called mengau.

The Igbos of Eastern Nigeria add palm oil and other seasonings to boiled and grated cassava, a dish called abacha.

People of the Niger Delta extract starch from cassava cooked into a starch eaten with pepper soup.

In Ghana, cassava is peeled, boiled until tender, and pounded in a large wooden mortar and pestle until it becomes homogeneous. This is called fufu. It is eaten with soup.

=== Europe ===
In Belgium, tiny white tapioca pearls are added to clear soups. Tapioca pearls are used in French desserts, such as parfaits. A savory snack in the United Kingdom, Skips, is made from flavored tapioca.

Tapioca is also widely available in its dried forms and is used in some countries to make tapioca pudding.

=== Other uses ===
Tapioca root can be used to manufacture biodegradable bags developed from a tapioca resin of the plant as a viable plastic substitute. The product is renewable, reusable and recyclable. Other tapioca resin products include gloves, capes and aprons.

Tapioca starch, used commonly for starching shirts and garments before ironing, may be sold in bottles of natural gum starch to be dissolved in water or in spray cans.

The low amylose and low residual content, combined with the high molecular weight of its amylose, make tapioca a useful starting material for modification into a variety of specialty products. Tapioca starch applications in specialty products have become increasingly popular. The effects of additives on thermal transitions and physical and chemical properties can affect the quality and storage stability of tapioca-based products.

Salt is often added to starch-based products to enhance flavor and functionality, as it can increase the gelatinization temperature of tapioca starch and delay the retrogradation of the gels formed upon cooling. Cations, particularly Na^{+} and Ca^{2+}, can interact electrostatically with the oxygen atoms in the glucose molecule of the starch polymer. This interaction induces an antiplasticizing effect and increases competition for available water, increasing the glass transition temperature of the gelatinized molecule.

== See also ==
- Bubble tea
- Cassava
- Potato starch
- Tapioca industry of Thailand
- Tapioca pearl
- Tapioca pudding
