= Sagu =

Sagu or SAGU may refer to:

== Places ==
- Sauvo or Sagu, Finland
- Sagu, Magway, a town in Central Myanmar
- Șagu, a commune in Arad County, Romania

== Other uses ==
- Sagu (dessert), a southern Brazilian dish
- Nelson University, formerly Southwestern Assemblies of God University (SAGU), a Christian private university in Waxahachie, Texas
- Four-ball billiards or sagu
- Phytelephas seemannii or sagu, a species of flowering plant in the family Arecaceae
- Sago or sagu, palm starch
- Security Assistance Group Ukraine (abbr. SAG-U)
