= Boba =

Boba may refer to:

- Boba, Hungary, a village in Vas county, Hungary
- Tapioca pearls, or boba, a starchy food
  - Bubble tea, or boba tea, a Taiwanese drink
- "Boba", 8th episode of Servant (TV Series)

== See also ==
- Boba Fett (disambiguation)
