= Chek ktis =

Cambodian dessert

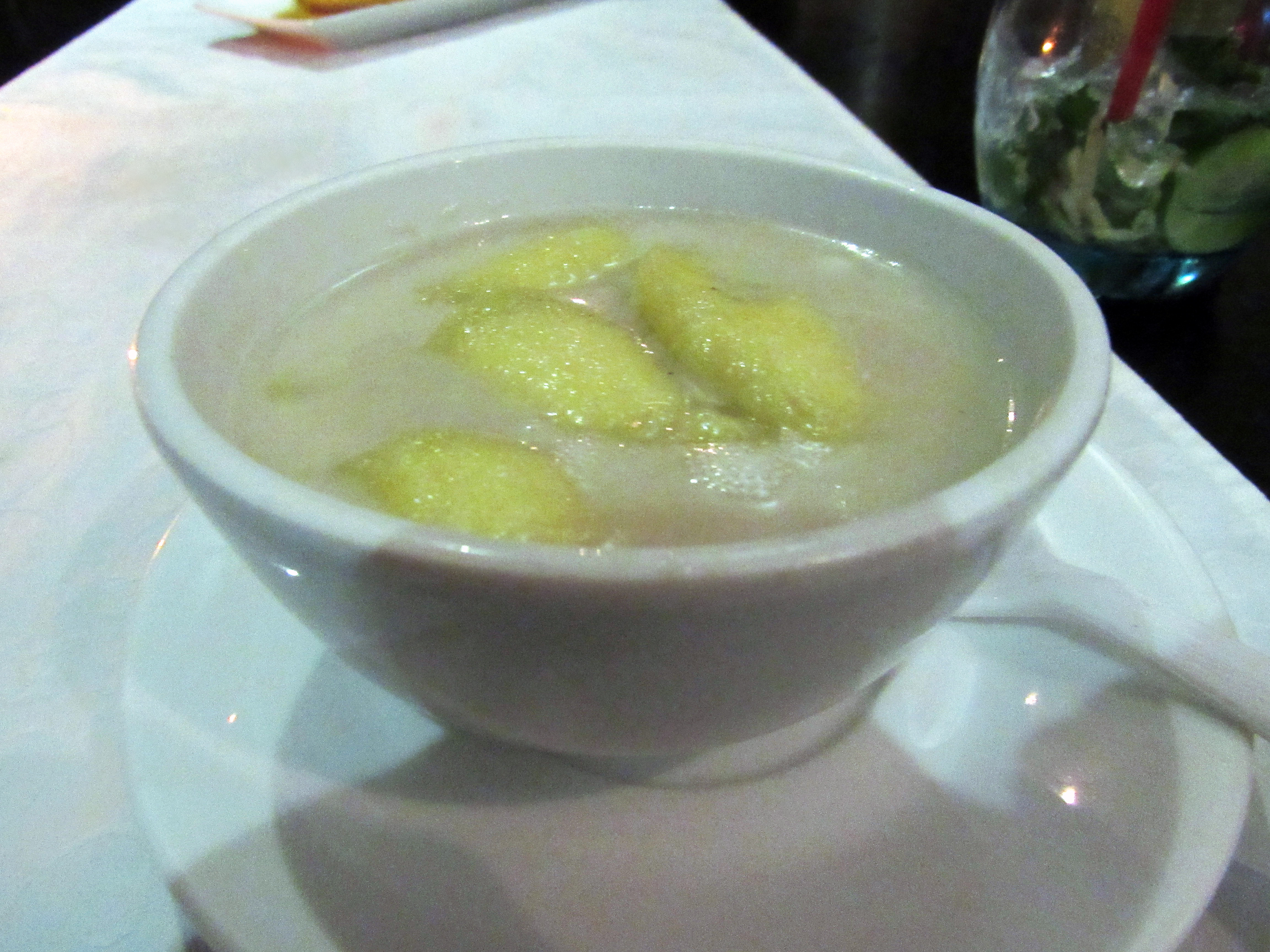
- Alternative names: chek ktiss, chek k'tiss, chet ktiss, cheak k'tih
- Type: dessert
- Place of origin: Cambodia
- Main ingredients: banana, coconut milk, tapioca pearls, sugar, sesame seeds
- Food energy (per serving): 318 kcal (1,330 kJ)
Nutritional value
(per serving)
- Protein: 4 g
- Fat: 15 g
- Carbohydrate: 48 g

Chek ktis (Khmer: ចេកខ្ទិះ, cek khtih; lit. 'banana coconut milk') is a Khmer dessert made by boiling bananas and tapioca pearls in sweetened coconut milk.

Traditionally, palm sugar and white sesame seeds are used, while more modern versions also use white sugar instead of palm sugar and supplement the dish with black sesame seeds and star anise.

== Preparation and serving ==
Tapioca pearls are rinsed and simmered in water until transparent and soft before adding sugar, salt, coconut milk, and bananas that have been cut lengthwise in half or sliced at an angle of about one-third of an inch. The mixture is brought to a boil and garnished with dry-roasted dried split mung beans or dry-roasted and partially grounded sesame seeds.
