= Booba (TV series) =

British animated children's television series

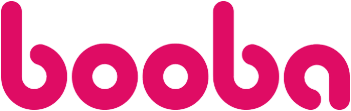
- Genre: Animated children's cartoon
- Written by: Deborah Macdonald; Evgeniy Krot (series 1, early episodes)
- Directed by: Leonid Rakhmanin; Sergey Gorobetc; Debbie MacDonald
- Voices of: Artem Cretov; Helen Solo; Samir Katari; Roman Karev; Elena Kareva
- Music by: De Wolfe Music
- Opening theme: Booba Theme Song
- Countries of origin: Russia; United Kingdom
- Original language: Non-dialogue
- No. of seasons: 6
- No. of episodes: 150

Production
- Running time: 3-4 minutes (series 1); 4-5 minutes (series 2-3); 7 minutes (series 4-present)
- Production companies: 3D Sparrow; Kedoo

Original release
- Network: YouTube
- Release: 10 November 2014 – present

Related
- The Booba Show, Booba: Food Puzzle, Booba's Bedtime Stories

Booba is an animated television series for children. It is produced by 3D Sparrow, the in-house production company for Kedoo. The show was on its sixth season by 2025.

== Creation ==
The idea for Booba was first conceived of in 2013. Initially, development of the cartoon was crowd-funded.

== Synopsis ==
The show follows the main character, Booba, and his friends, Loola, Spike, and Mr Beak, as they go on unique adventures. The cartoon has no words or speech and as of the later episodes, was intended for children one to three years of age. Each episode is a few minutes long.

== Broadcast ==
The show began airing in 2016. It became more popular over time and broadcasting deals expanded the cartoon to Netflix, as well as to broadcasters in Turkey, Latin America, Poland, and elsewhere.

While Booba has aired in more than 45 countries, the shows are typically released on YouTube first. It's also on free, ad-supported "FAST channels". Booba merchandise is licensed through IMG, which has sold 40,000 Booba toys. Producer Kedoo was initially founded as a copyright and trademark firm specializing in YouTube in 2016. However, it became primarily a content development studio after creating Booba. Kedoo expanded internationally and created other shows.

By 2020, the show had been streamed 5.3 billion times, or 20 billion by 2024. In 2025, HBO Max began broadcasting Booba globally, except in the United States.

== Episodes ==
=== Series overview ===
Season	Episodes	Originally released		
Season	Episodes	First released	Last released	Network
Pilot		April 12, 2010		YouTube
1	26	November 10, 2014	December 5, 2017	YouTube
2	26	December 20, 2017	October 17, 2019	YouTube
3	26	October 24, 2019	February 21, 2021	YouTube
4	26	October 26, 2021	December 22, 2022	YouTube
5	26	March 21, 2023	December 24, 2024	YouTube
6	14	April 17, 2025	March 11, 2026	YouTube

=== Pilot (2010) ===
The pilot can be found on YouTube.

Title	Original release date
"BuBa"	April 12, 2010
Booba (originally named Buba) gets into random shenanigans in an unknown location.

=== Season 1 (2014–17) ===
No. overall	No. in season	Title	Original release date
1	1	"Kitchen"	November 10, 2014
Booba enters a kitchen.
2	2	"Bathroom"	November 26, 2014
Booba enters a bathroom.
3	3	"Nursery"	December 12, 2014
Booba enters a nursery.
4	4	"Office"	January 27, 2015
Booba enters an office.
5	5	"Game Room"	March 12, 2015
Booba enters a game room.
6	6	"Biology Cabinet"	December 3, 2015
Booba enters a class.
7	7	"The Candle"	January 19, 2016
Booba tries to unlit a candle.
8	8	"Garage"	March 17, 2016
Booba enters a garage.
9	9	"Attic"	April 28, 2016
Booba enters an attic.
10	10	"Bow Tie"	June 30, 2016
Booba tries to get a bow tie protected behind glass doors.
11	11	"Mousetrap"	July 28, 2016
Booba tries to get cheese from a mousetrap.
12	12	"Painting"	September 8, 2016
Booba stows away in a suitcase,and ends up in a hotel room, and then messes with a painting.
13	13	"Bakery"	October 27, 2016
Booba enters a bakery.
14	14	"Circus"	November 22, 2016
Booba appears on a circus arena, where a magician left his magic hat. Let’s find out what tricks Booba can repeat and what will come after!
15	15	"Party"	December 27, 2016
Booba enters a party room.
16	16	"Cinema Hall"	January 19, 2017
Booba enters a cinema hall.
17	17	"Bulb"	February 16, 2017
Booba tries to make a lightbulb dim.
18	18	"Burger"	March 16, 2017
Booba decides to make a burger.
19	19	"Metro"	April 26, 2017
Booba is in the subway.
20	20	"Supermarket"	May 11, 2017
Booba is in the supermarket.
21	21	"Concert Hall"	June 22, 2017
Booba meets Loola in a concert hall.
22	22	"Grapes"	July 13, 2017
Booba and Googa (aka Mr. Beak) fight over grapes.
23	23	"Disco"	August 22, 2017
Booba and his friends dance.
24	24	"Noise"	October 5, 2017
Booba is disturbed by a noise.
25	25	"Fitness Club"	October 31, 2017
Booba is in the gym.
26	26	"UFO"	December 5, 2017
Booba has to escape a UFO.

=== Season 2 (2017–19) ===
No. overall	No. in season	Title	Original release date
27	1	"Terrace"	December 20, 2017
Booba wants to relax but mosquitoes make it difficult.
28	2	"Train"	January 25, 2018
Booba boards a train.
29	3	"Aircraft"	March 1, 2018
Booba gets on a plane.
30	4	"Museum"	April 13, 2018
Booba is in the museum.
31	5	"Farm"	April 26, 2018
Booba is at a farm.
32	6	"Ball"	June 7, 2018
Booba has to catch a ball.
33	7	"Sandwiches"	July 5, 2018
Booba and Loola make sandwiches.
34	8	"Remote Control"	August 24, 2018
Booba plays with a remote control but is unaware that it is causing trouble for Loola.
35	9	"Super Booba"	October 25, 2018
Booba decides to become a superhero.
36	10	"Hockey"	November 15, 2018
Booba plays hockey.
37	11	"Christmas Tree"	December 21, 2018
It's Christmas Eve.
38	12	"Playtime"	January 3, 2019
Booba and Loola have to get his lollipop back from Noodle the worm.
39	13	"Video Game"	February 6, 2019
Booba is transported into a video game.
40	14	"Ghost"	March 14, 2019
Booba thinks he is haunted.
41	15	"Toy Store"	April 18, 2019
Booba is in a toy store.
42	16	"Crazy Golf"	May 2, 2019
Booba and his friends play golf.
43	17	"Bowling"	May 26, 2019
Booba goes bowling.
44	18	"Ballet"	June 6, 2019
Booba and Loola are in the theater. Loola is ballet dancing, but Booba complicates it when he sees what he thinks is cheese.
45	19	"Gift Shop"	June 25, 2019
Booba is at a gift shop.
46	20	"Spaceship"	July 11, 2019
Booba goes into space trying so save the spaceship from asteroids.
47	21	"Music Shop"	July 23, 2019
Booba is at a music shop.
48	22	"Magic Chalk"	August 6, 2019
Booba and his friends play with magic chalk.
49	23	"Treasure Map"	September 3, 2019
Booba and Loola find a treasure map.
50	24	"Magic Wardrobe"	September 17, 2019
Booba wants to relax but mosquitoes make it difficult.
51	25	"Guest"	October 3, 2019
Booba has a guest.
52	26	"Show"	October 17, 2019
Booba and his friends entertain the audience with a show.

=== Season 3 (2019–21) ===
No. overall	No. in season	Title	Original release date
53	1	"Halloween"	October 24, 2019
It's Halloween.
54	2	"Flying"	November 5, 2019
Booba wants to fly.
55	3	"Kitchen Adventures"	December 5, 2019
In another kitchen, Booba causes chaos with Noodle.
56	4	"Santa's Grotto"	December 16, 2019
Booba gets into a shopping mall decorated for Christmas.
57	5	"Office"	January 9, 2020
Booba and his friends get into an office. Note: The title is a callback to the Season 1 episode "Office."
58	6	"Circus Adventure"	February 7, 2020
Booba gets into shenanigans at the circus.
59	7	"Booba in the Future"	February 21, 2020
Booba is in the future.
60	8	"Juice"	March 25, 2020
Booba decides to quench his thirst.
61	9	"Clay Crafts"	March 17, 2020
Booba plays with clay.
62	10	"Firefigther"	March 24, 2020
Booba explores a fire museum.
63	11	"Easter"	April 7, 2020
It's Easter.

== Related media ==
In addition to the main series, another short called Food Puzzle was introduced with season 3. A live-action version where Booba visits the real world, called The Booba Show, came out in 2024.
