= Buba (disambiguation) =

Buba is a city in Guinea-Bissau.

Buba may also refer to:

- Buba River, a river in Guinea-Bissau
- Buba (clothing), a woman's blouse worn in West African countries
- Buba (footballer) (born 1993), Brazilian footballer
- Buba (name), a given name and surname
- BUBA, Reuters listing for Deutsche Bundesbank
- Buba (elephant) (born before 1996), elephant that made the news in December 2020 in the Netherlands

== See also ==
- Bouba (disambiguation)
- Booba (born 1976), A French rapper
- Boohbah, a British children's television programme
- Bubba, a term of endearment mainly given to boys
