= Sabudana khichri =

Indian food

Sabudana khichdi
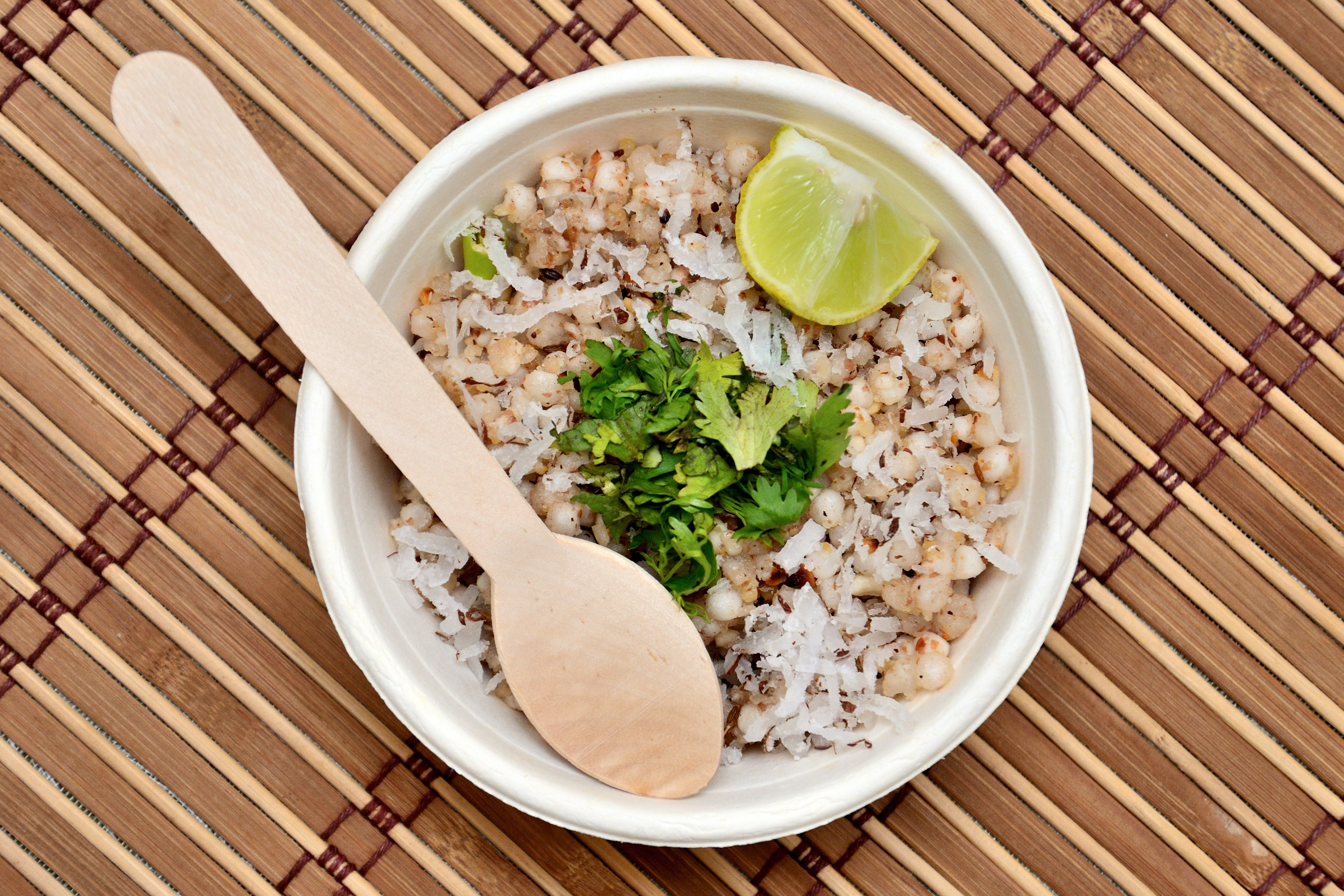
- Course: Breakfast, snack
- Place of origin: India
- Region or state: Across many regions of India
- Main ingredients: Tapioca pearls, potatoes, peanuts, grated coconut, green chilies, ghee

Sabudana khichri (also spelled khichdi) is an Indian dish made from soaked sabudana (tapioca pearls). It is the dish of choice when an individual observes a fast during Shivratri, Navratri, or a similar Hindu religious occasion.

It is typically prepared in the Indian states of Maharashtra, Karnataka, Uttar Pradesh, Madhya Pradesh, Rajasthan, Gujarat and West Bengal. In major towns like Mumbai, Pune, Indore, Bhopal, Jaipur and Nagpur, it is available as street food and is widely eaten throughout the year.

== Preparation ==
The sabudana is soaked in water overnight and then drained. It is mixed well with coarsely ground peanuts, rock salt and sugar. Ghee or oil is heated in a pan. The sabudana-peanut powder mixture is sauteed in it along with cumin seeds, chopped green chillies and chopped potatoes. The khichdi is cooked for a few minutes and then served.

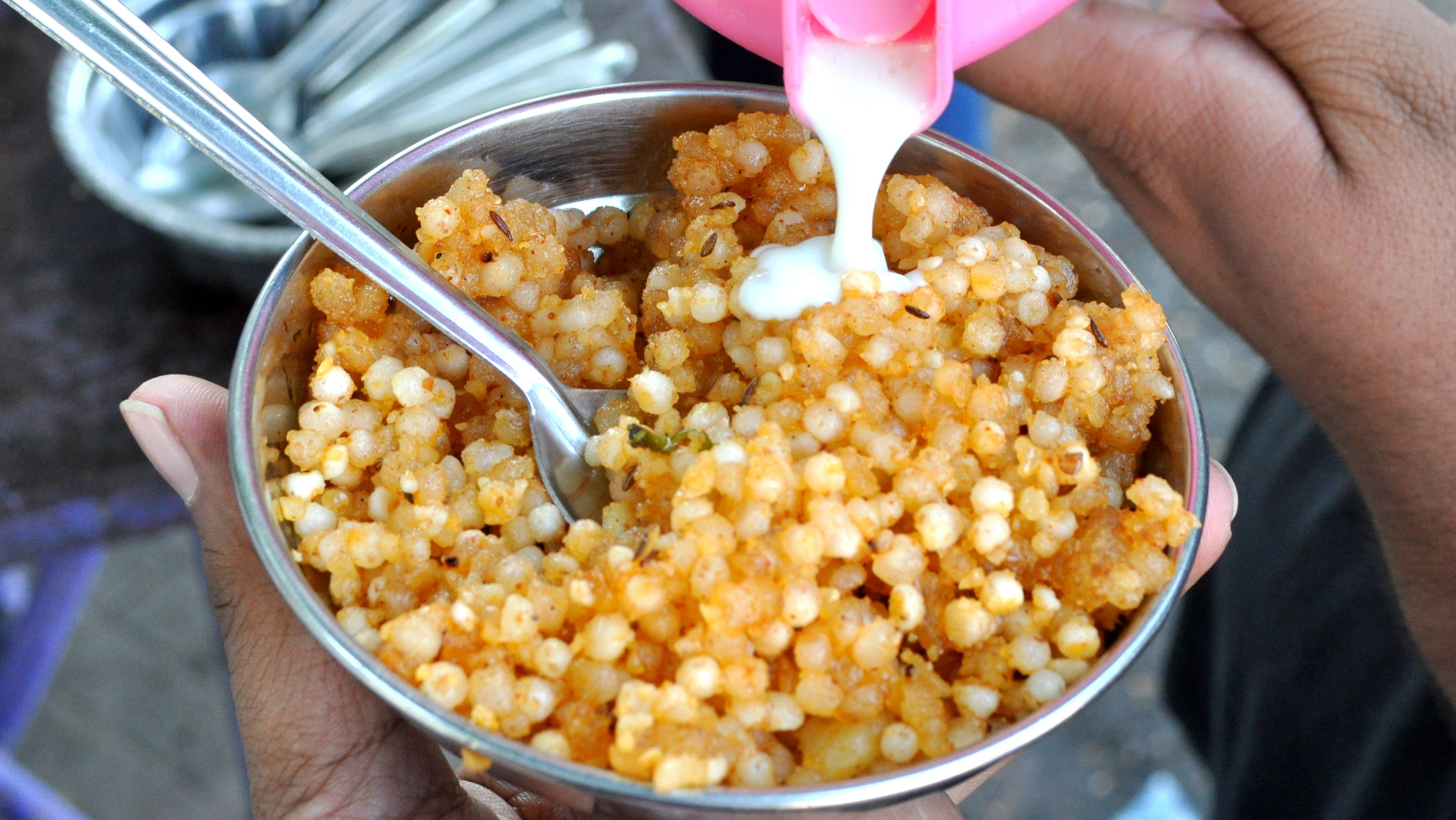
Sabudana khichri with sweet curd
