= Buba (name) =

Buba is both a given name and a surname. Notable people with the name include:

- Buba Badjie (born 1967), Gambian-Swedish veterinarian
- Buba Baldeh (1953–2014), Gambian politician, journalist and newspaper editor
- Buba Espinho (born 1995), Portuguese singer and songwriter
- Buba Galadima, Nigerian politician
- Buba Yohanna (born 1982), Cameroonian footballer
- Minusu Buba (born 1985), Nigerian footballer
- Pasquale Buba (1946–2018), American film editor
- Tony Buba (born 1943), American filmmaker

== Fictional characters ==
- Buba Kastorsky, "original coupletist hailing from Odesa", fictional character in "Red Western" films about The Elusive Avengers

== See also ==
- Buba Corelli, stage name of Amar Hodžić (born 1989), Bosnian rapper
- Buba, 2022 spin-off film of the German TV series How to Sell Drugs Online (Fast), for the character of that name
