= Kedoo =

Entertainment company based in Dubai

Kedoo Entertainment
- Type: Private
- Industry: Entertainment
- Founded: 2013; 13 years ago
- Founder: Olivier Bernard
- Headquarters: Dubai, UAE
- Products: animated series, documentary, film
- Services: production and distribution
- Website: kedoo.com

Kedoo Entertainment is an entertainment company specializing in producing, distributing, and managing premium kids' and general entertainment content. It is headquartered in Dubai, with offices in London, Cairo, Kyiv, and Moscow. Kedoo's non-dialogue animated series, Booba, ranked in Netflix's Top 10 charts and aired in 45 countries.

== History ==
Kedoo Entertainment was co-founded by Olivier Bernard in 2013 as a digital distribution company. In the same year, Kedoo launched Booba on YouTube, a non-dialogue comedy series that sees Booba characters exploring different scenarios with his friends. It was launched as a digital-first brand initially commissioned with five episodes. Booba was created by 3D Sparrow, an independent animation studio based in the UK, which has been creating animated content such as Food Puzzle since its founding in 2013 by Bernard.

In January 2018, the show Booba aired in Italy on De Agostini's kids' channels, Super! and DeA Junior, as well as in Russia on Karusel. In August, Kedoo signed a distribution and licensing deal with Netflix, including a two-year worldwide agreement. In November, during the Asian Animation Summit, Kedoo announced its Kedoo Originals, a new programming aimed at acquiring, developing, distributing and co-producing children's animated programs for digital platforms, including YouTube, Netflix, Amazon, Roku, Yandex and Dailymotion. In October 2020, Kedoo Entertainment launched the Super Toons TV channel in the UK and Spain, followed by Italy, France, Germany, Austria, and Switzerland in December. It was later made available across Europe via Samsung's streaming service, Samsung TV Plus.

In January 2021, Netflix renewed its distribution and licensing deal with Kedoo for Booba’s third season, which was set to premiere in February 2021, in addition to Booba’s spin-off series, Food Puzzle. In 2022, Kedoo launched a travel documentary series titled ¡Vamos! (Let's Go! in English) on YouTube, the documentary explores the real-life situation of people living in difficult places around the world.

In January 2023, ITV acquired seasons two and three of Booba, making them available on its streaming platform ITVX alongside the launch of the fourth season on Netflix. By the same time, STAR Channel acquired the four seasons to be available in Greece, and in Australia on 9GO!, and in Slovenia on Pro Plus.

In 2024, Kedoo launched Sonya from Toastville, an animated series about a girl who discovers that her bread box can teleport her to the magical city of Toastville. Kedoo published a travel documentary show titled The Wonder Guys, hosted by Emily Laing and Steve Prior, a former BBC journalist. The documentary visits several places, including Las Vegas, Area 51, and El Paso, while documenting the US-Mexico border crisis and exploring its duality.

Booba Season 5 premiered in November 2024 and was broadcast on several networks, including ITVX in the UK, Star Channel in Greece, RTL in Croatia, VOYO in CEE, Nine Network in Australia, and CDA Premium in Poland. In the same month, Kedoo announced the launch of a live-action edutainment series, The Booba Show, which is scheduled to premiere on YouTube in January 2025.
