= Bouba =

Bouba may refer to:

- Bouba/kiki effect, an observed neurophysiological effect tying certain sounds to specific shapes
- Bouba (TV series), a.k.a. Jacky and Jill, or Monarch: The Big Bear of Tallac, a Japanese anime television series in the late 1970s
- Yaws

== See also ==
- Buba (disambiguation)
- Booba (born 1976), A French rapper
- Boohbah, a British children's television programme
