= Boba Fett (disambiguation) =

Boba Fett is a fictional character from the Star Wars franchise.

Boba Fett or Bobafett may also refer to:

== Music ==
- Boba Fett, a nickname of Swedish rock musician Anders Lindström
- Bobafett, a bass guitarist featured on the 2002 album Bermuda Triangle

== Literature ==
- Boba Fett: Twin Engines of Destruction (comic book) a 2000 one-shot Star Wars comic book from Dark Horse comics starring the eponymous Star Wars character
- Star Wars: Boba Fett (series of comic book series), a series of 5 comic book series, each of multiple volumes, from the 1990s through the 2000s, starring the bounty hunter
- Star Wars: Boba Fett (novel series), a series of 6 Star Wars novels published in the mid-2000s, starring the bounty hunter
- Boba Fett: A Practical Man (novella), a 2006 Star Wars novella by Karen Traviss, starring the eponymous bounty hunter
- The Tale of Boba Fett: The Last One Standing (short story), a 1996 Star Wars short story starring the bounty hunter
- The Tale of Boba Fett: A Barve Like That (short story), a 1995 Star Wars short story starring the bounty hunter

== Other uses ==
- Jango Fett, a character in Star Wars
  - Clone trooper, fictional soldiers featured in Star Wars who, like Boba Fett, are cloned from Jango Fett
- The Book of Boba Fett, a Star Wars TV series
