= Booba Starr =

- Born: Dane Salmon; 6 November 1984 (age 41)
- Origin: Kingston, Jamaica
- Genres: Reggae, Dancehall
- Years active: 2010–present
- Labels: Starr Team Records; JAFRICA RECORDS

Dane Salmon (born 6 November 1984), better known by his stage name Booba Starr, is a Jamaican reggae and dancehall singer and songwriter. He is a follower of the Rastafarian Faith.

== Early life and career ==
Booba Starr was born Dane Salmon in Kingston, Jamaica. He spent is early childhood in kingston before his parents moved to the Greater Portmore area of Saint Catherine. Booba Starr's interest in music began while attending Kingston College High School. He began writing poems and songs during this high school days, and would perform them to entertain his family.

He would later hone his skills on a local sound system called Hard Drive, and this experience gave him the confidence to pursue his musical interests. In 2010 he was introduced to the owner of Jafrika Records, Trevor 'TC' Clarke. His first song, "Things Changed" was produced by TC Clarke. A year later, Booba Starr invested in his own recording studio and began to record his own music. He did some work with the Austrian-based Lyrical Wars Records. Since opening his own recording studio he has voiced on riddims for multiple records labels and producers including: Julius "Zege" Mitchell of Sweatboxx Productions, Dimmie Joe Muzik & G5 Entertainment. He also recorded a single entitled "Hackle Di Body" for Jafrika label.
