= Tapioca pearl =

Starch pearls used as food

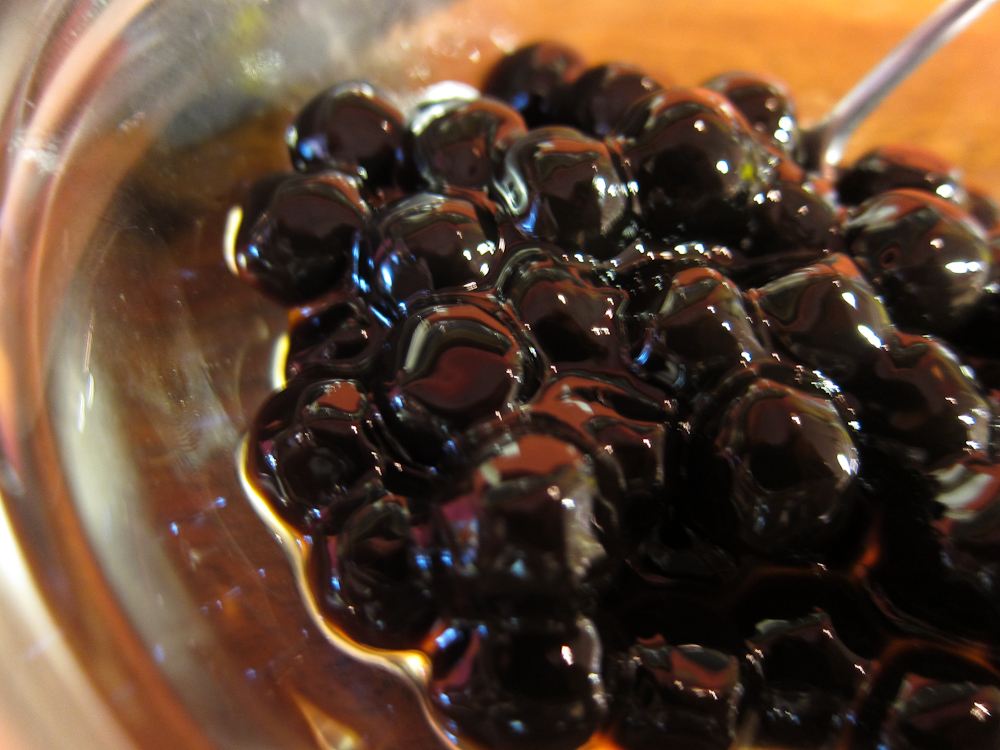
Tapioca pearls

A tapioca pearl, also known as a tapioca ball, is an edible translucent sphere produced from tapioca, a starch made from the cassava root. They originated as a cheaper alternative to sago in Southeast Asian cuisine. When used as an ingredient in bubble tea, they are most commonly referred to as pearls or boba. The starch pearls are typically five to ten millimeters (0.2 to 0.4 inches) in diameter. By adding different ingredients, like water, sugar, or some other type of sweetener like honey, tapioca pearls can be made to vary in color and in texture. Various forms of tapioca pearls include black, clear, flavored, popping, and mini. Tapioca pearls are commonly soaked in sugar syrup to make them sweet and chewy. In teas, they are often added for their texture, with the flavor being provided by the drink itself.

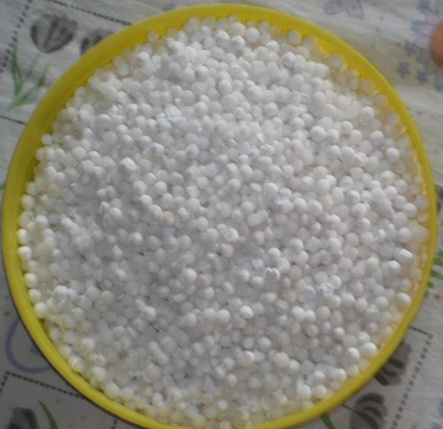
Sabudana

The pearls are known as sabudana in the Indian subcontinent; they are used for sweet and savory dishes, such as sabudana khichri. In Brazil, the pearls are cooked with wine or other liquid to add flavor and are called sagu. In the United States, tapioca pudding is traditionally made as a custard-style dessert. The typical American version uses small pearl tapioca, milk, sugar, and eggs, cooked slowly until thick and creamy.

== History ==
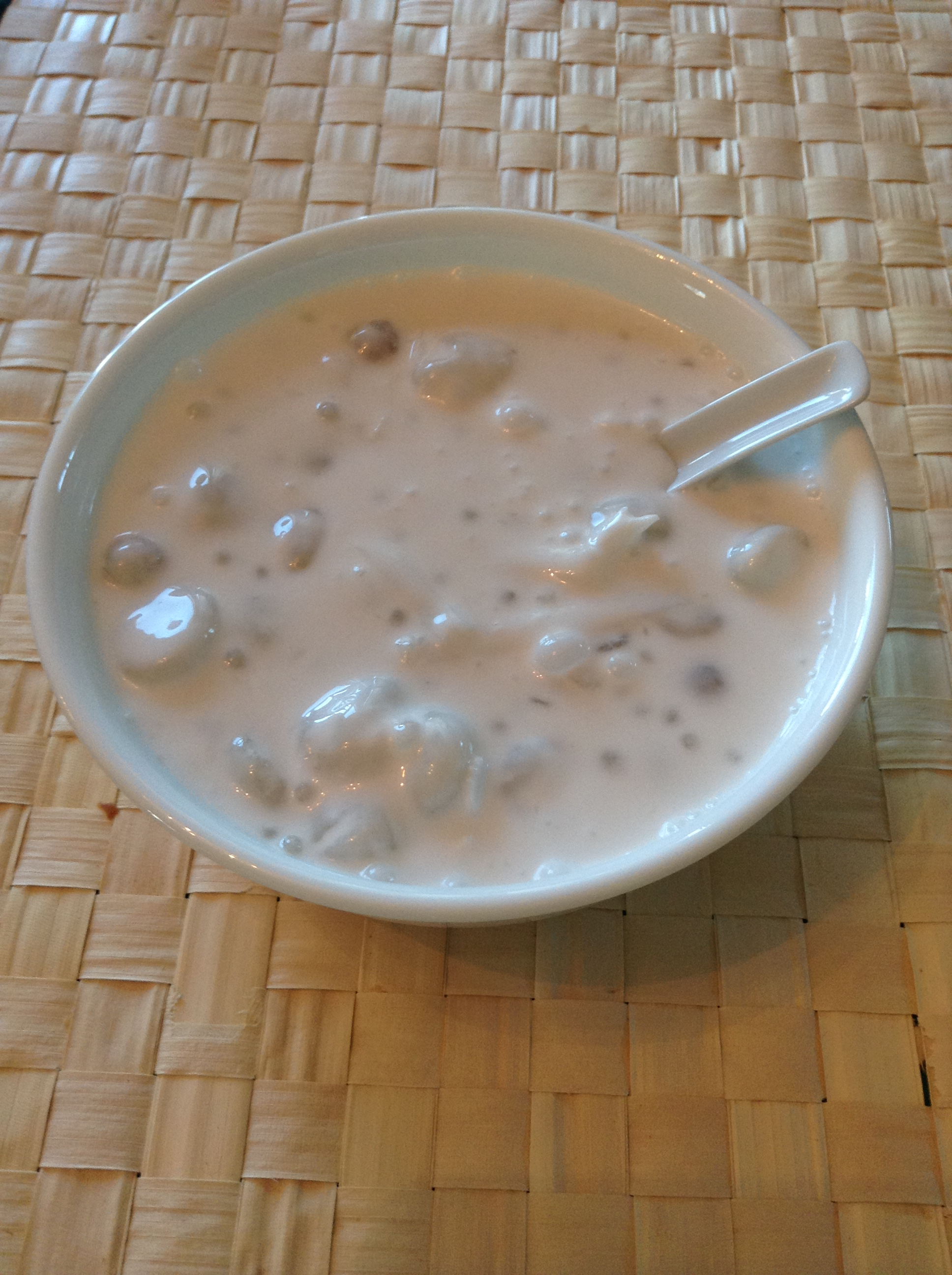
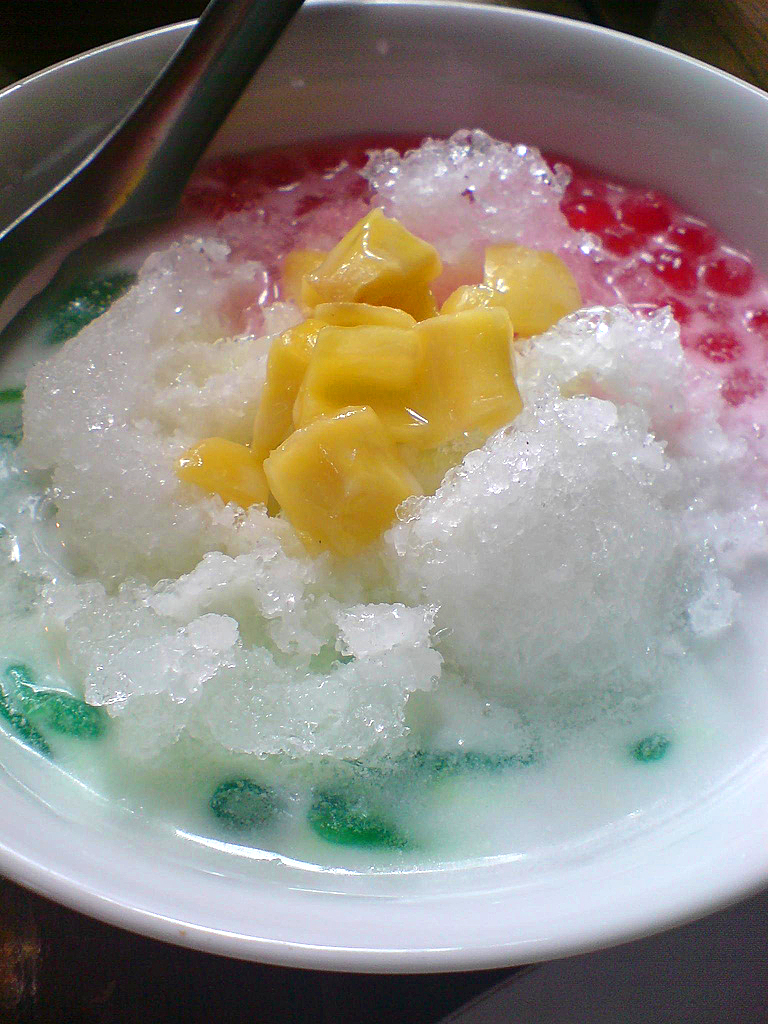
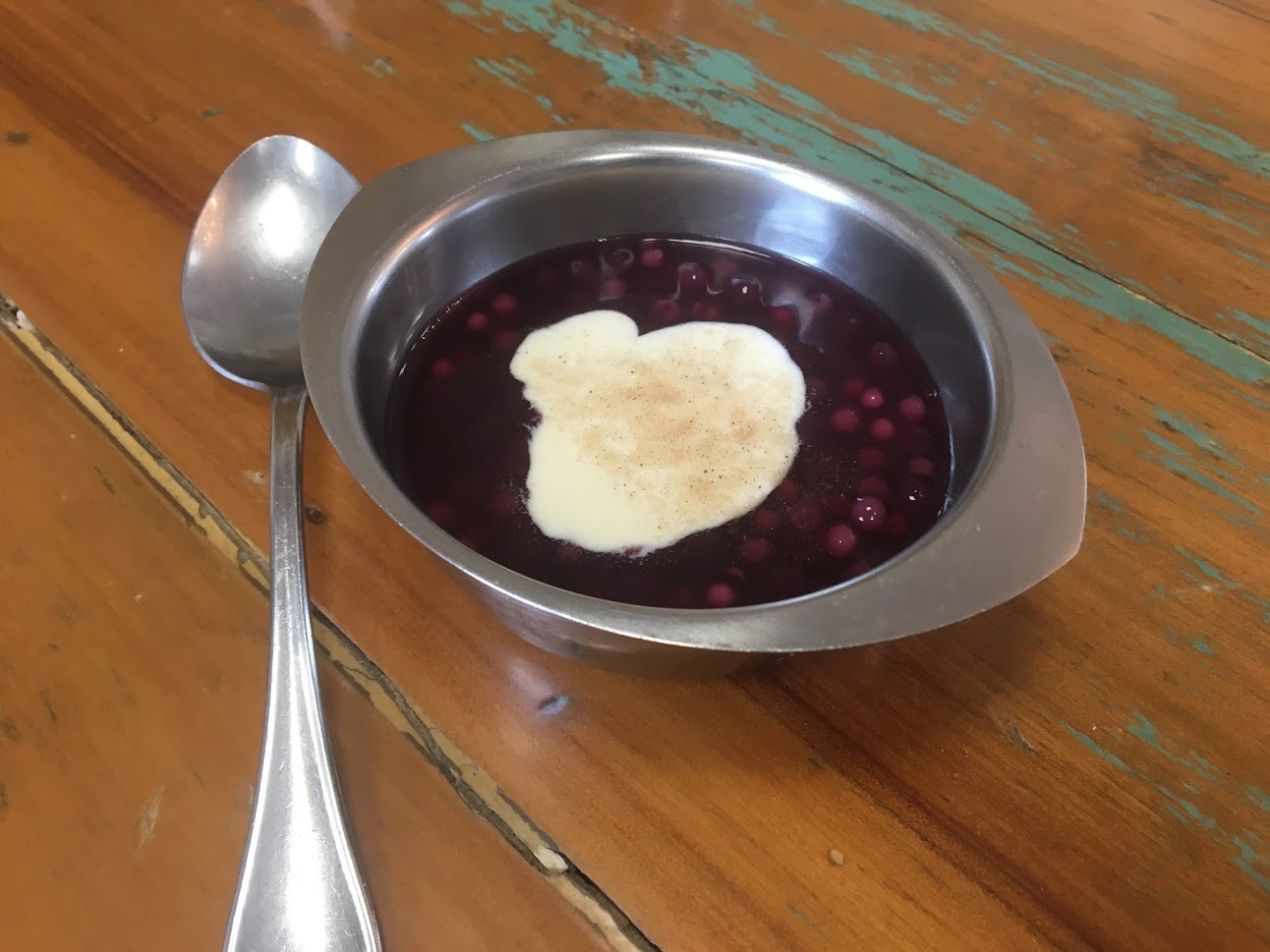
Left: Bilo-bilo, a Filipino warm dessert soup of tapioca pearls in coconut milk;
Middle: Es campur, an Indonesian shaved ice dessert with various fruits and jellies;
Right: Sagu de vinho with crème anglaise, a southern Brazilian dessert of tapioca pearls in wine.

Making jelly-like desserts from starch and using them in dessert dishes and drinks originated from Island Southeast Asia. Traditional versions of tapioca pearls made from native starch sources like palm hearts or glutinous rice include pearl sago, landang, and kaong. They are used in a wide variety of dishes and drinks like bilo-bilo, binignit, es campur, es doger, and halo-halo, among others. The introduction of cassava from South America during the colonial era added another starch source to Southeast Asian cuisine, resulting in cassava-based versions of Southeast Asian dishes that were formerly made from native starch sources. Among these are tapioca pearls, which originated as a cheaper alternative to pearl sago. They are virtually indistinguishable in taste and can be used interchangeably.

Pearl sago and tapioca pearls were introduced to Chinese cuisine via the Hokkien diaspora. They are popularly sold in "jelly tapioca pearls" (also known as "frog egg drinks") which are adaptations of Southeast Asian drinks and shaved ice desserts. They get their Mandarin name, "frog eggs", from their white appearance in the balls' centers after cooking. Vendors who sell the drink usually add syrup or creamer before serving, or serve it on top of shaved ice. In Taiwan, bubble tea is commonly referred to as pearl milk tea (zhēn zhū nǎi chá, 珍珠奶茶) because originally, small tapioca pearls with a 2.1 mm (1/12 in) diameter were used.

The making of tapioca balls was also introduced to Brazil (where cassava is native), where they are still known as sagu, despite being made from cassava and not sago palms. Sagu is used in a traditional dish known as sagu de vinho ("wine sago"), popular in the southern state of Rio Grande do Sul. It is usually mixed with sugar and red wine and served generally at room temperature. It is also often added to tea drinks.

== Popularity ==
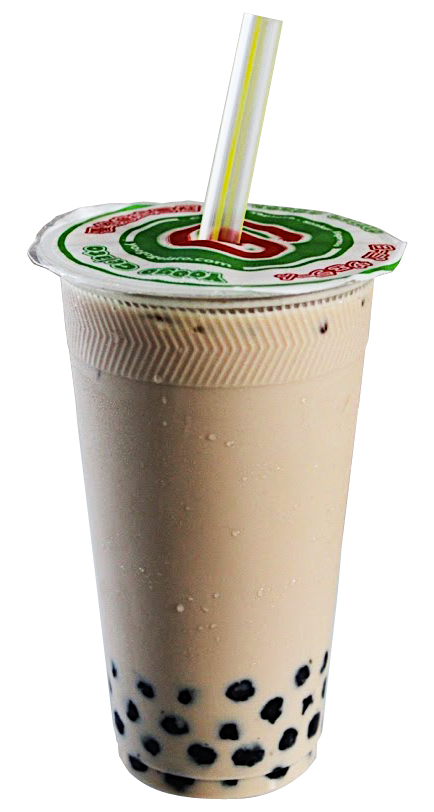
Bubble Tea

Tapioca pearls have increasingly gained greater global popularity since the 2010s due to the spread of Taiwanese bubble tea, also called boba tea, across Europe and North America. McDonald's restaurants in Germany and Austria were temporarily selling the dessert beverage as part of their revamped McCafé menu in 2012. Tapioca pearls have also gained popularity throughout fast food restaurants in the United States like Jack in the Box. Starbucks and Baskin-Robbins briefly sold bubble tea drinks in the United States in the early 2010s.

== Manufacturing ==
Tapioca pearls are derived as baked tapioca products, which are obtained from heat treatment of the moist cassava starch in shallow pans.

=== Preparation of wet flour ===
To create pearls, tapioca flour (also known as tapioca starch) is mixed with boiling water until a kneadable consistency is achieved. The dough is cut and rolled into a spherical shape. One method of achieving the correct shape is called the gangsor method. The starch is inserted into a long, cylindrical twill cloth bag and a jerking motion is used to toss the starch lumps back and forth. The lumps will become more firm and gain a more spherical shape. The process is repeated until the pearls have roughly become the desired size, then sorted according to size.

Another method is to feed the moist flour into open cylindrical pans, which rotate for a certain amount of time and at a specific speed to form the pearls.

=== Gelatinization ===
Traditionally, during heat treatment, the temperature is kept moderate so that only the surface layer of the lumps of the moist starch begins to gelatinize, and this process is described as gelatinization. One process of gelatinization is performed by placing the pearls inside shallow pans, which are then placed inside a brick oven. The pans are covered with a towel soaked in oil or fat to prevent burning the starch. While the pearls are heated over a moderate fire, it is stirred continuously with large forks to prevent burning. When this hand-baking process is applied to manufacture pearls, irregularly shaped beads may be obtained, inferior in color and in other qualities.

To produce first-rate products, the starch beads are poured onto plates in a thick layer, and the plates are slowly drawn through a tunnel charged with steam. In this way, uniform gelatinization is ensured.

=== Drying ===
During the gelatinization process, since moisture content does not change much, another drying stage is required to achieve the desired moisture content of 12%. Drying is done in a chamber dryer and when drying, it must have an initial temperature of below 40 °C (104 °F) to avoid further gelatinization.

=== Freezing ===
Other than drying, freezing can also be used to preserve pearls before consumption. After gelatinization, the pearls are soaked in ice water to decrease the viscosity and enhance chewiness. If stored, pearls should be frozen using a quick freezing device, such as an air-blast freezer, or through an individual quick freezing process to prevent them from sticking together. One important note is that retrogradation happens quickest at near 0 °C temperatures, which would lead to tougher pearls, so it is best to minimize the time that the pearls spend in that temperature range and freeze the pearls to lower temperatures quickly.

== Preparation for consumption ==
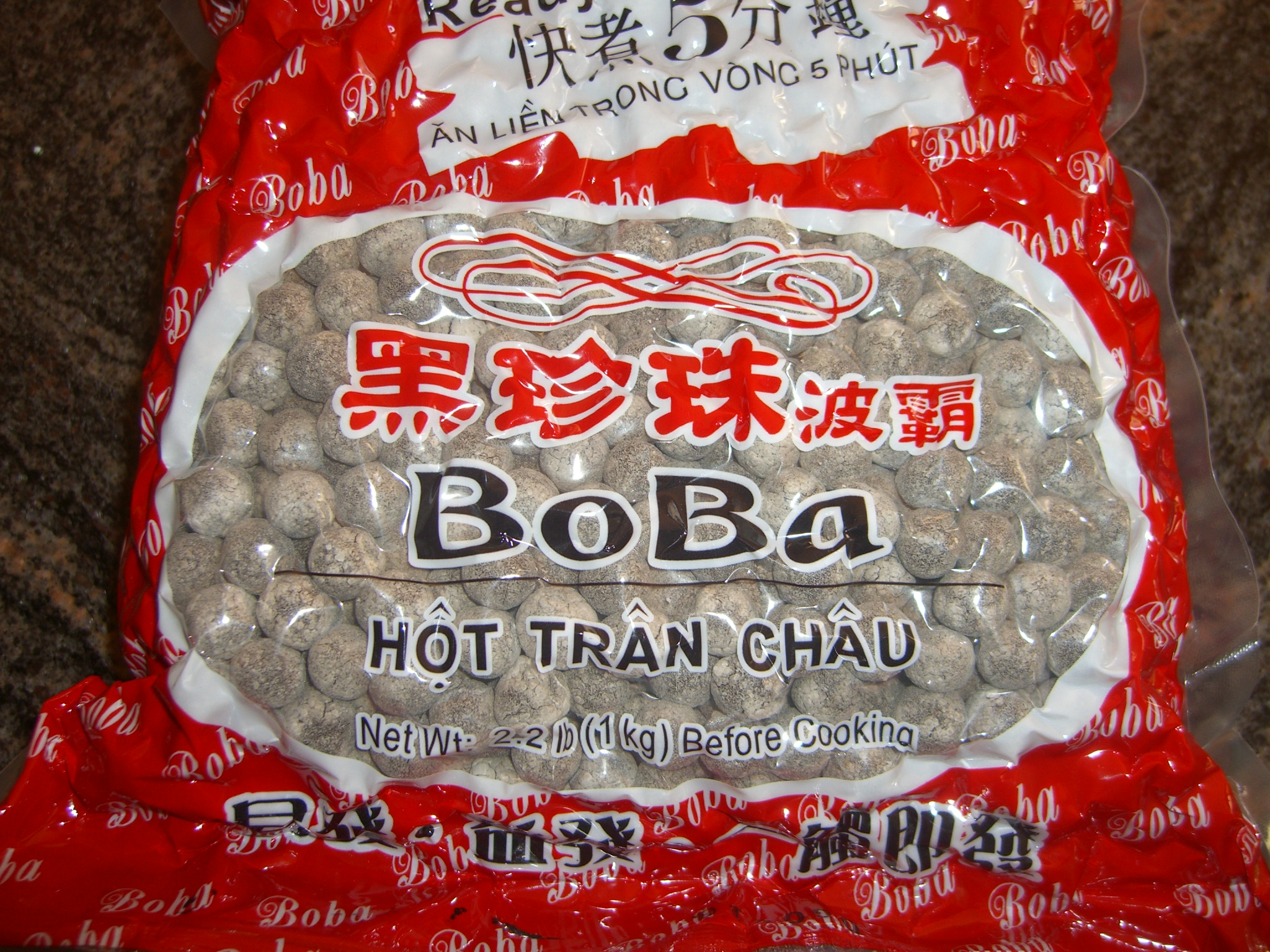
Prepackaged tapioca pearls

Consumers and food retail establishments can purchase raw tapioca starch and create their own pearls, or they can purchase partially cooked pearls, which have already gone through the gelatinization process. Raw tapioca pearls usually require 45 minutes of boiling whereas partially-cooked tapioca pearls require 30 minutes. To ensure a chewy texture, the pearls are then cooled for approximately 20 minutes. One can verify whether the pearls are ready to serve by taking a pearl and chewing it, making sure it is well-cooked all the way to the center.

In addition to the shorter cooking time, another benefit of partially cooked tapioca is that it lasts longer, with a shelf life of 8 months compared with the shelf life of 6 months for raw tapioca. Cooked tapioca pearls should only be kept for around 4–6 hours. When serving tapioca pearls, the pearls will harden once submerged in water and will eventually soften and lump together. Lumping of tapioca pearls can be avoided by stirring and adding sugar.

After the tapioca pearls are cooked, they should be strained through a colander and then rinsed to remove excess starch. Then, if they're to be used as something sweet, such as in bubble tea or as a dessert topping, the tapioca pearls are soaked in a sugar solution for ten minutes. The sugar will also help to prevent them from lumping. The only way to determine the quality of the tapioca pearls is by the texture. The pearls will all stick together if they are too soft and squishy. They will be too difficult to chew if they are too hard. There is a balance for tapioca being both chewy and firm. There is a Chinese term for this pronounced QQ. This is similar to the Italian term al dente describing pasta that is chewable, but not too soft.

== Health and nutrition information ==
Tapioca starch is composed mainly of carbohydrates. A 100-gram serving provides approximately 367 calories and 86.7 grams of carbohydrates. It contains no protein, fat, cholesterol, or sodium. Additionally, it has no sugars and minimal dietary fiber, with about 3.3 grams per 100 grams.

Tapioca starch contains some essential minerals, such as 100 mg of calcium, 1 mg of iron, and 933 mg of potassium per 100 grams. This makes it a useful ingredient for those needing a gluten-free, nut-free, or grain-free option.

== Additives ==
German researchers from University Hospital Aachen tested the tapioca pearls from an unnamed Taiwanese chain in 2012. According to the New York Daily News, the report showed that carcinogenic chemicals were found in the samples. Chemicals found included styrene, acetophenone, and brominated substances, which were not permitted as food additives and usually contaminants from non-food-grade plastic. Another German study found carcinogenic PCBs, or polychlorinated biphenyls, in the starchy pearls as well.

In 2013, the Agri-Food and Veterinary Authority of Singapore recalled tapioca pearls from bubble tea shops after 11 kinds of Taiwanese tapioca products that contained maleic acid were discovered. The Taiwanese FDA has completed a crackdown on maleic acid in food in June 2013.

The starch that tapioca pearls are made of, in combination of thickeners and other additives, when consumed in large amounts may lead to bowel obstruction.

== See also ==
- Arenga pinnata
- Chondrus crispus
- Agar
- Helmipuuro
