= Sagu (dessert) =

Brazilian dessert made with tapioca pearls

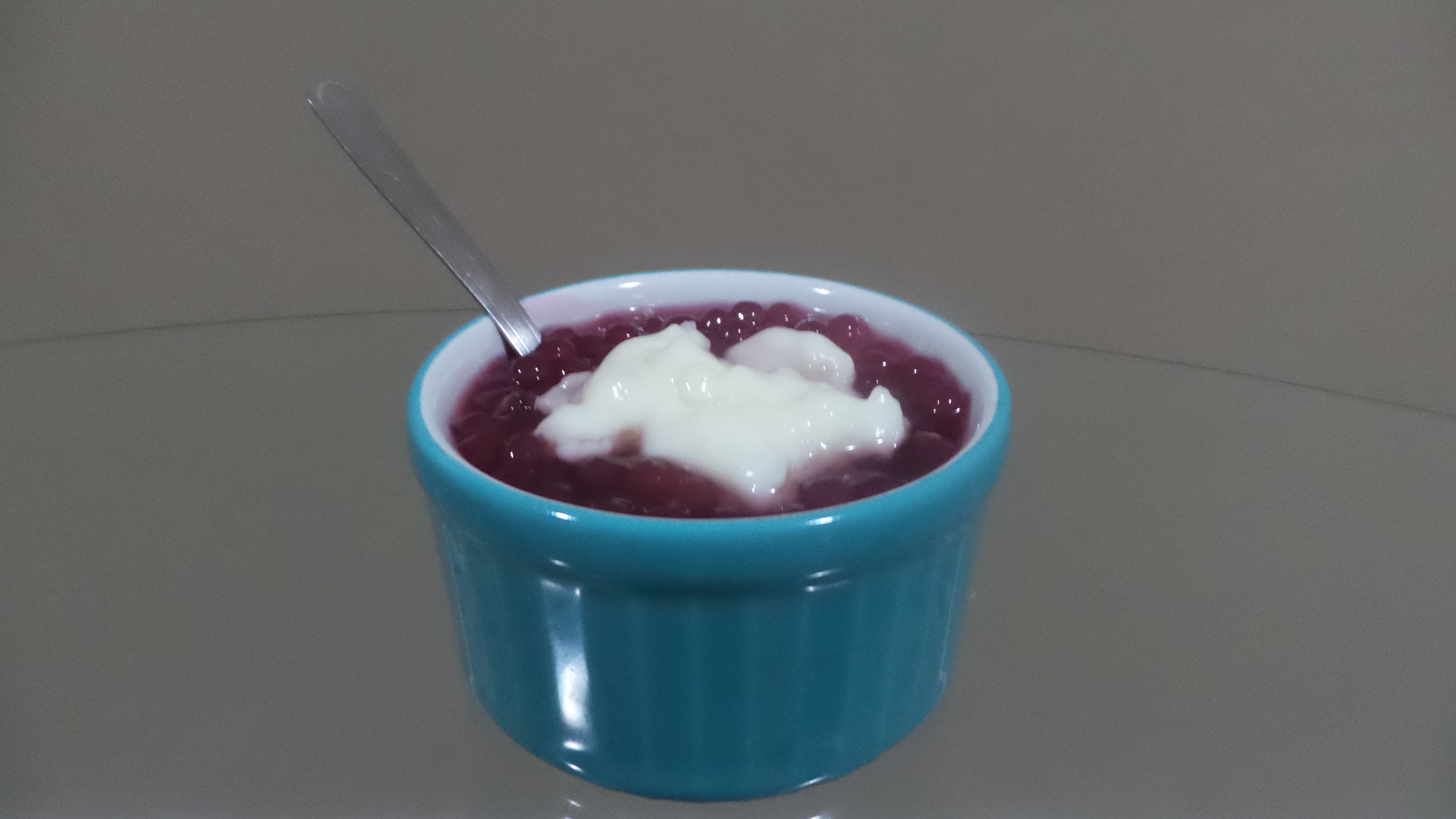
- Sagu de vinho served with white cream on top.
- Alternative names: Sagu de vinho
- Course: Dessert
- Place of origin: Southern Brazil
- Serving temperature: Warm, cold or at room temperature
- Main ingredients: Tapioca balls and red wine

Sagu (or sagu de vinho — Portuguese pronunciation: [saˈɡu dʒi ˈviɲu]) is a southern Brazilian dessert, made with tapioca pearls, sugar and red wine. It is typical of the three southern states of Rio Grande do Sul, Santa Catarina and Paraná.

The sago balls were introduced to Latin America from Southeast Asia via the Spanish and Portuguese Empires. In Brazil, tapioca pearls are still known as sagu, despite being made from the native South American cassava, and not sago palms. These pearls are used in this traditional dish, known as sagu de vinho ("wine sago"), or just sagu, created in the Serra Gaúcha region, in the northeastern part of Rio Grande do Sul, but consumed in all the state. It is usually mixed with sugar and red wine and then served warm or cold, with crème anglaise on top of it (sometimes with beaten egg whites with sugar).

In some recipes, wine is mixed with grape juice, with the intent of making the dessert sweeter and less alcoholic. It is also common to infuse the wine with cinnamon and cloves to add flavor to the dish. Although tapioca pearls can be made at home, they are more commonly store-bought.

In this kind of dessert, the tapioca pearls can be also prepared with milk or fruit juice (like orange, tangerine or pineapple – generally made by people of German descent), instead of red wine, but these variations are quite rare, the wine sagu being the most popular version.

== History ==
The highland region Serra Gaúcha, where the dessert was created, is situated in the northeastern part of Rio Grande do Sul, shown in red.

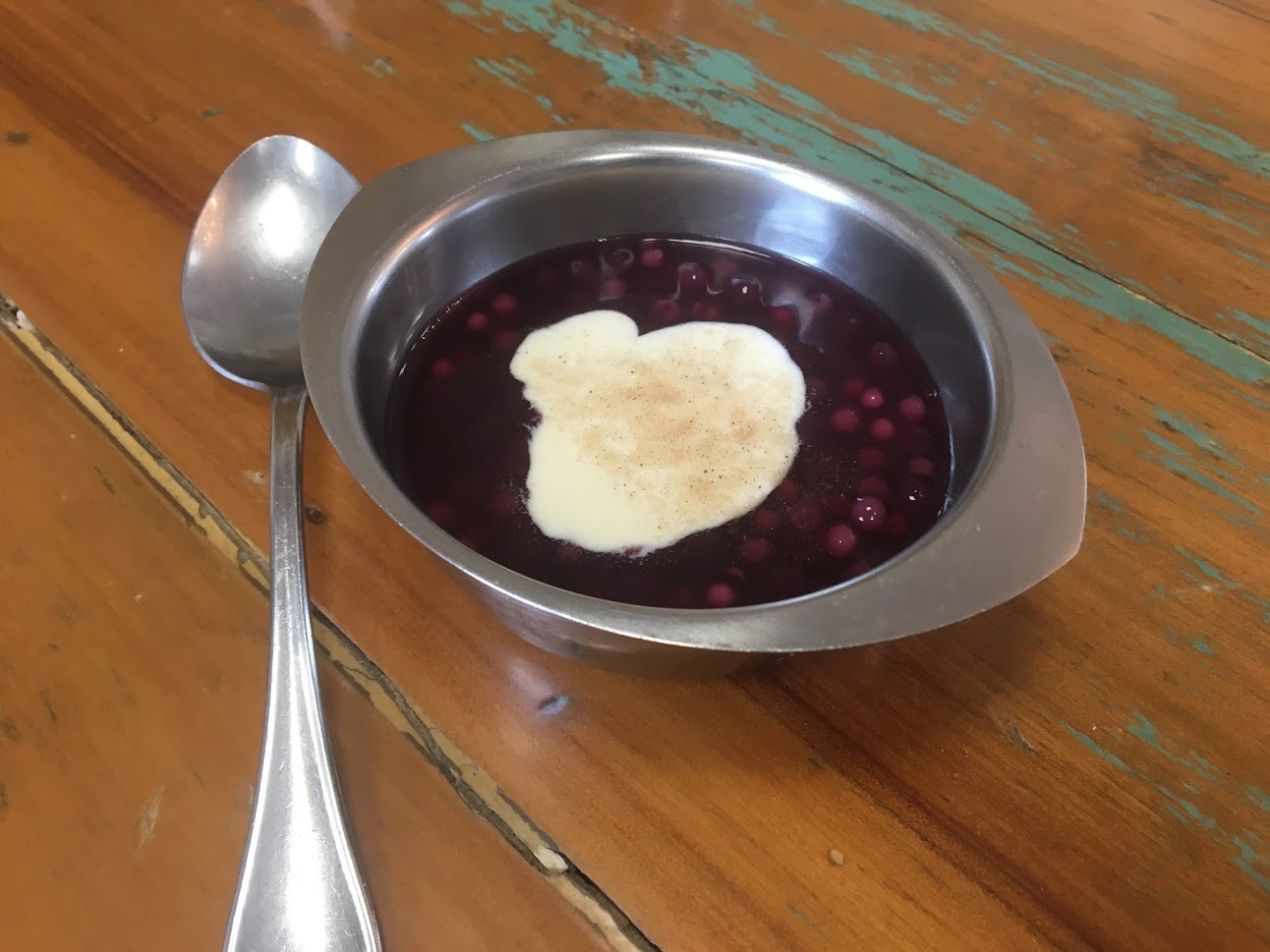
Sagu made with wine and with crème anglaise

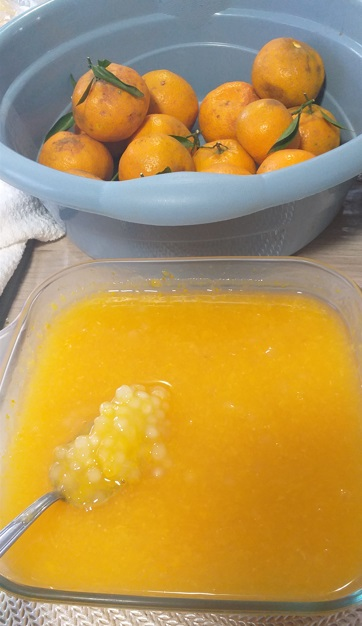
Sagu made with tangerine

Sagu (from Malay sago or sagu) originally referred to starch extracted from Southeast Asian sago palms (saguzeiro in Portuguese), which is usually made into sago pearls in Southeast Asian cuisine. After cassava (native to South America) was introduced to Southeast Asia during the colonial era, it became an alternative starch source for making pearl sago, resulting in the name "sagu" or "sago" being used interchangeably for cassava, potato or sago starch in European cuisine. The making of tapioca balls was introduced to Brazil after the arrival of European immigrants, which became known as sagu, despite being made from native cassava starch.

The indigenous peoples in Brazil have already chopped and cooked cassava roots for food.

With the transfer of the Portuguese Court to Brazil, in the beginning of the 19th century, the cassava flour started being prepared with Port wine, resulting in a kind of sweet porridge, such as a "parent" of sagu de vinho. In the beginning of the 20th century, some of small corporations in the southern Brazil, created by descendants of Europeans, started to produce the cassava starch as an alternative to the typical products of Europe, like the potato starch. In the 1940s, 1950s and 1960s, corporations of the state of Santa Catarina and Rio Grande do Sul became producers of tapioca pearls (made of cassava), used in this dessert.

Some traditional German recipes which use potato starch, like rote grütze, are very similar to sagu because they are mixture of starch and red fruits.

Although this recipe did not arrive in Brazil with the European immigrants, sagu is a symbol of the European colonization because this dessert was created by them in southern Brazil. It represents mainly the northern Italian immigration, due to the flavors and the ingredients, and German, because of the industrial technology. Cassava is a typical indigenous Brazilian ingredient that was absorbed by the traditions of the European immigrants, mixed with the traditional Italian red wine.

There are lesser traditional variations of this dessert, according to the origin of the immigrants. In the families of German origin, for example, sagu can be prepared with milk, wine or also with fruits, like orange or pineapple. The Italian families make the dessert only with red wine.

The Serra Gaúcha region was colonized by northern Italian (mainly from Veneto) and German peoples, among other European immigrants (like Poles). The rest of the state was colonized mainly by the Azorean Portuguese, Arabs (mainly from Lebanon, Syria and Palestinian territories) and Africans (mainly from Angola). This dish is popular in Rio Grande do Sul, but it is also a common dessert served in restaurants in the states of Santa Catarina and Paraná). However, it remains almost unknown in other Brazilian states and neighbouring countries, like Argentina and Uruguay.

== Taste and characteristics ==
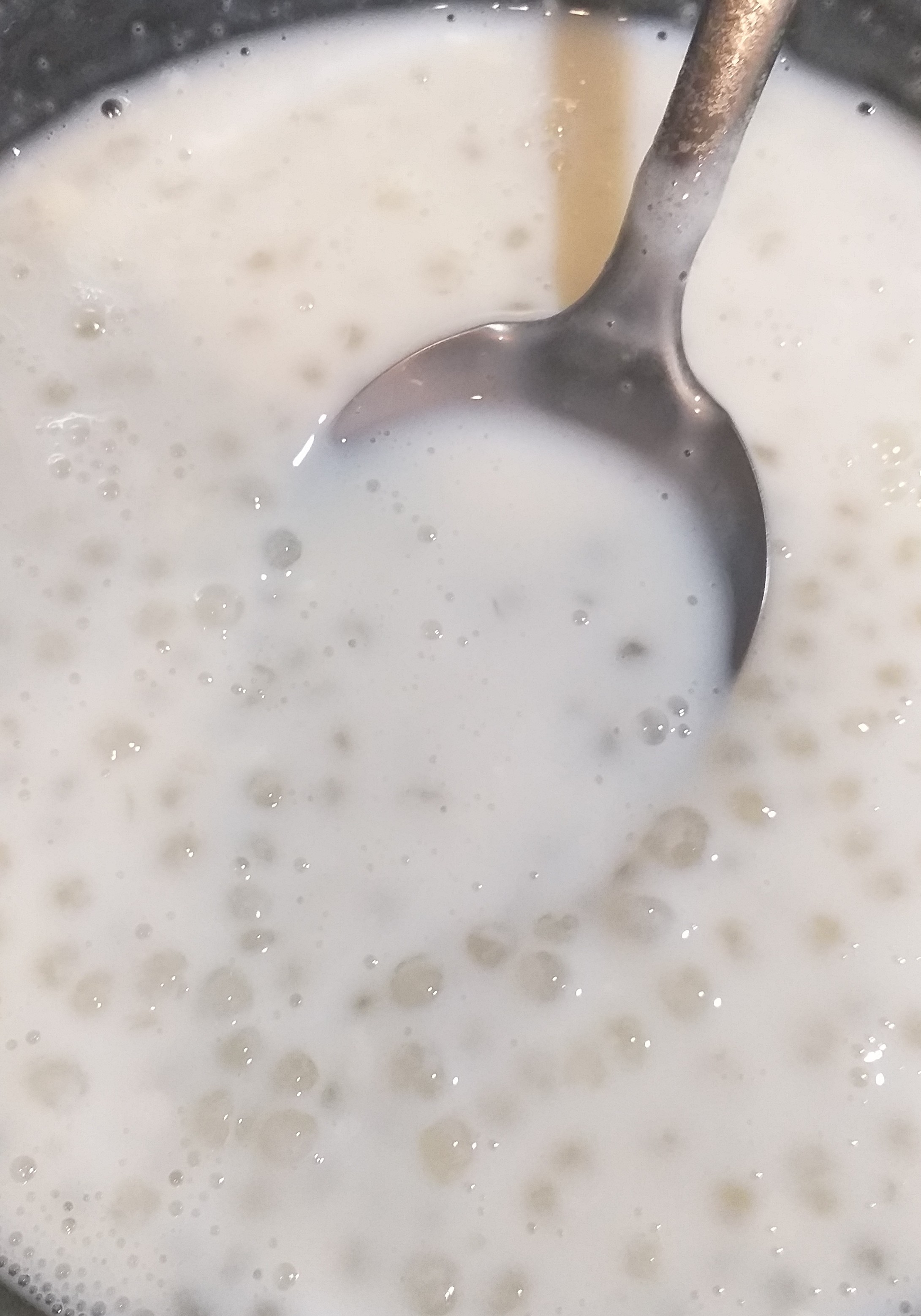
Sagu made with milk

This dessert is not so sweet. For this reason, it is usually more appreciated by adults than children. In the southern Brazilian region, there is a preference for less sweet desserts, explaining its popularity in the state.

It is described as a "sweet caviar, full of little purple balls, monochromatic and with an intense but delicate flavor". This recipe is relatively easy to be prepared and its smell is unmistakable.

== Preparation ==
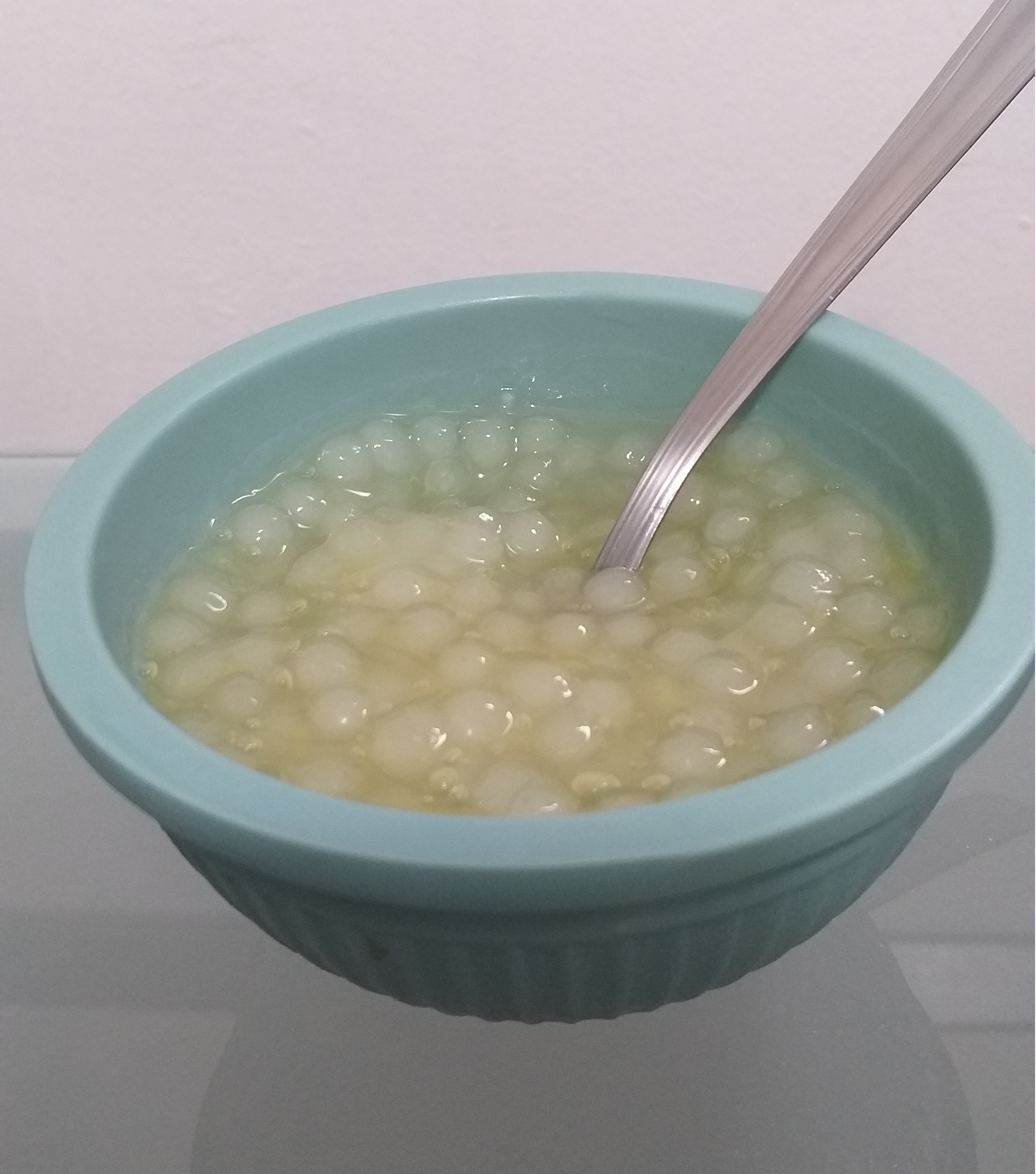
Sagu made with orange

The cassava root is cleaned, grated and mixed with water. After that, it is passed through a sieve with a thick fabric, producing little balls, which are heated and then cooled, getting hard and opaque.

The pearls are submerged in water for generally a whole day, then drained. This time varies according to the source of the recipe (some sources say that just one hour is necessary). Then red wine, milk or fruit juice is boiled and water, cloves and cinnamon are added to it. When boiling the mixture again, the sago pearls are added, being stirred constantly to avoid it from sticking on the bottom of the pan. Finally, sugar is added and the mixture is stirred until it gets the wanted consistency (it can be smoother or harder, and more liquid or solid).

It can be served warm, cold or at room temperature.

== Nutritional information ==
The tapioca balls are quite caloric because they are pure starch, being a good source of energy. They also have dietary fiber, iron, calcium and a small amount of proteins.

== See also ==
- List of Brazilian sweets and desserts
