= List of bubble tea chains =

This list of bubble tea chains includes notable bubble tea vendors.

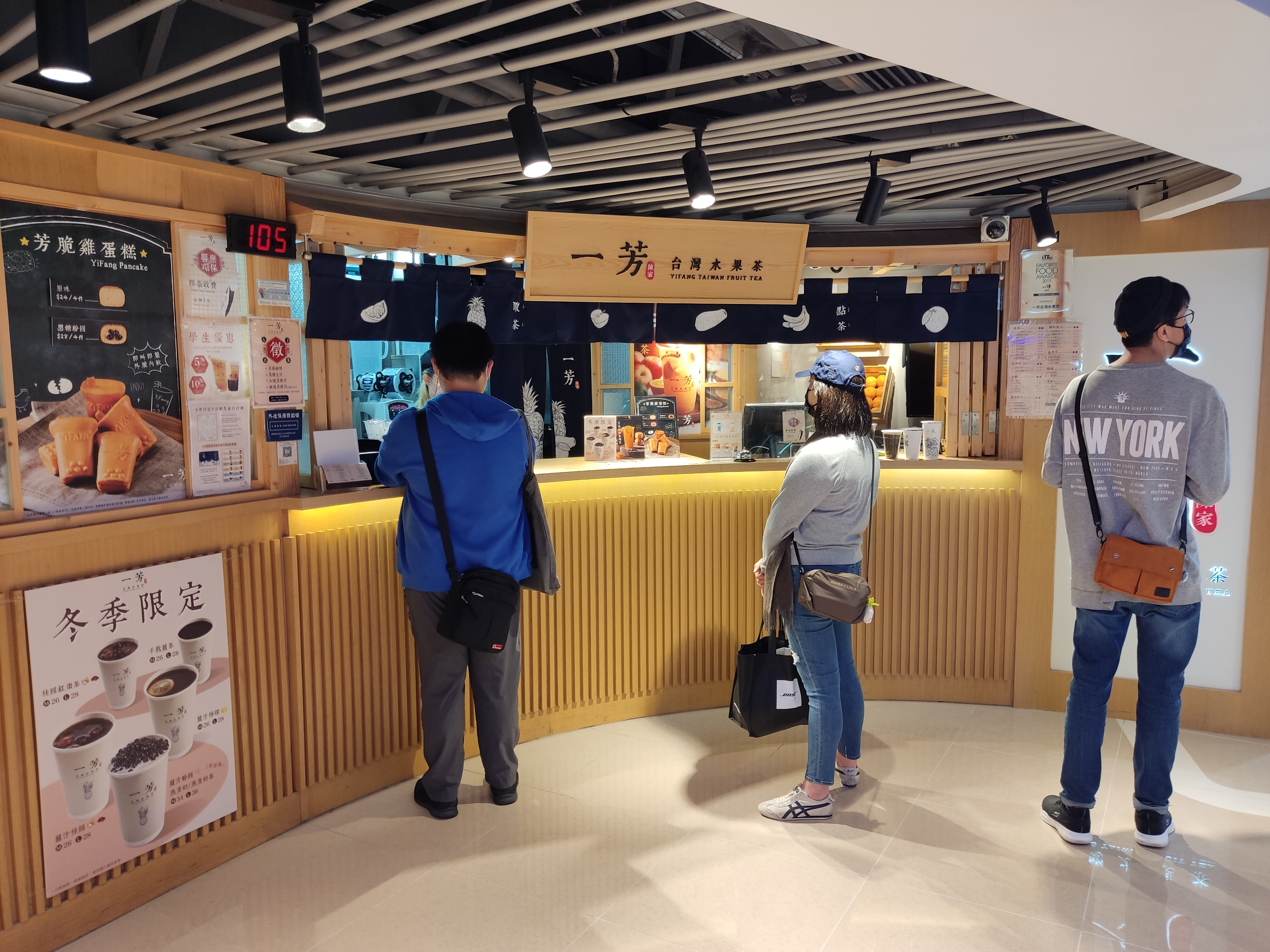
Bubble tea shop in Hong Kong

== China ==
- Auntea Jenny
- Chagee
- ChaPanda
- CHICHA San Chen
- Good me
- Heytea
- Macao Imperial Tea
- Mixue
- Modern China Tea Shop
- Molly Tea
- Naisnow
- Yihetang

== Taiwan ==
- 50 Lan
- 85°C Bakery Cafe
- 8yotea [zh]
- Chatime
- Chun Shui Tang
- CoCo
- Comebuytea
- DaYung's [zh]
- Don't Yell at Me
- Ding Tea
- EasyWay
- Hanlin Tea [zh]
- Gong Cha
- Happy Lemon
- Machi Machi
- MACU [zh]
- Meet Fresh
- Milksha
- Mr. Wish
- ONEZO [zh]
- Quickly
- Sharetea
- Sprino Tea [zh]
- Tea & Magic Hand [zh]
- TEA'S Bubble Tea [zh]
- Ten Ren Tea
- The Alley
- Tiger Sugar
- TP Tea
- TRUEDAN [zh]
- Unique Green [zh]
- Xing Fu Tang
- Yifang Taiwan Fruit Tea

== United States ==
- Boba Guys
- Boba Tea Company
- Drip Tea
- It's Boba Time
- Kung Fu Tea
- Lollicup Coffee & Tea
- Seattle Best Tea
- Tapioca Express
- Teaspoon

== Other ==
=== Philippines ===
- ChaYi
- Serenitea
- Zagu

=== Malaysia ===
- Tealive

=== Singapore ===
- Bober Tea and Mochi Dough

=== Thailand ===
- ChaTraMue

== See also ==
- List of teahouses
