= The Easy Way =

The Easy Way or Easy Way may refer to:

- The Easy Way (film), a 2008 French heist film
- The Easy Way (Jimmy Giuffre album)
- The Easy Way (Eddy Arnold album)
- Easyway, a Portuguese punk rock band
- EasyWay, an international tea outlet
- Easy Way (song), a song by Deborah Cox
- Easyway, a program and series of books by Allen Carr.
- "The Easy Way", a song by Westlife from the 2007 album Back Home
