= Teaspoon (disambiguation) =

A teaspoon is a small spoon, and a measure of volume.

Teaspoon may also refer to:

- Teaspoon (restaurant), a chain of bubble tea shops based in the United States
- "Teaspoon", a song by The Long Winters from the 2006 album Putting the Days to Bed
- Aloysius "Teaspoon" Hunter, a character in the American television series The Young Riders

== See also ==
- T-Spoon, a Dutch pop/dance band created in 1991
- Iced tea spoon, a long, thin spoon used primarily in the United States
