= Seattle Best Tea =

Tea shop in Seattle, Washington, U.S.

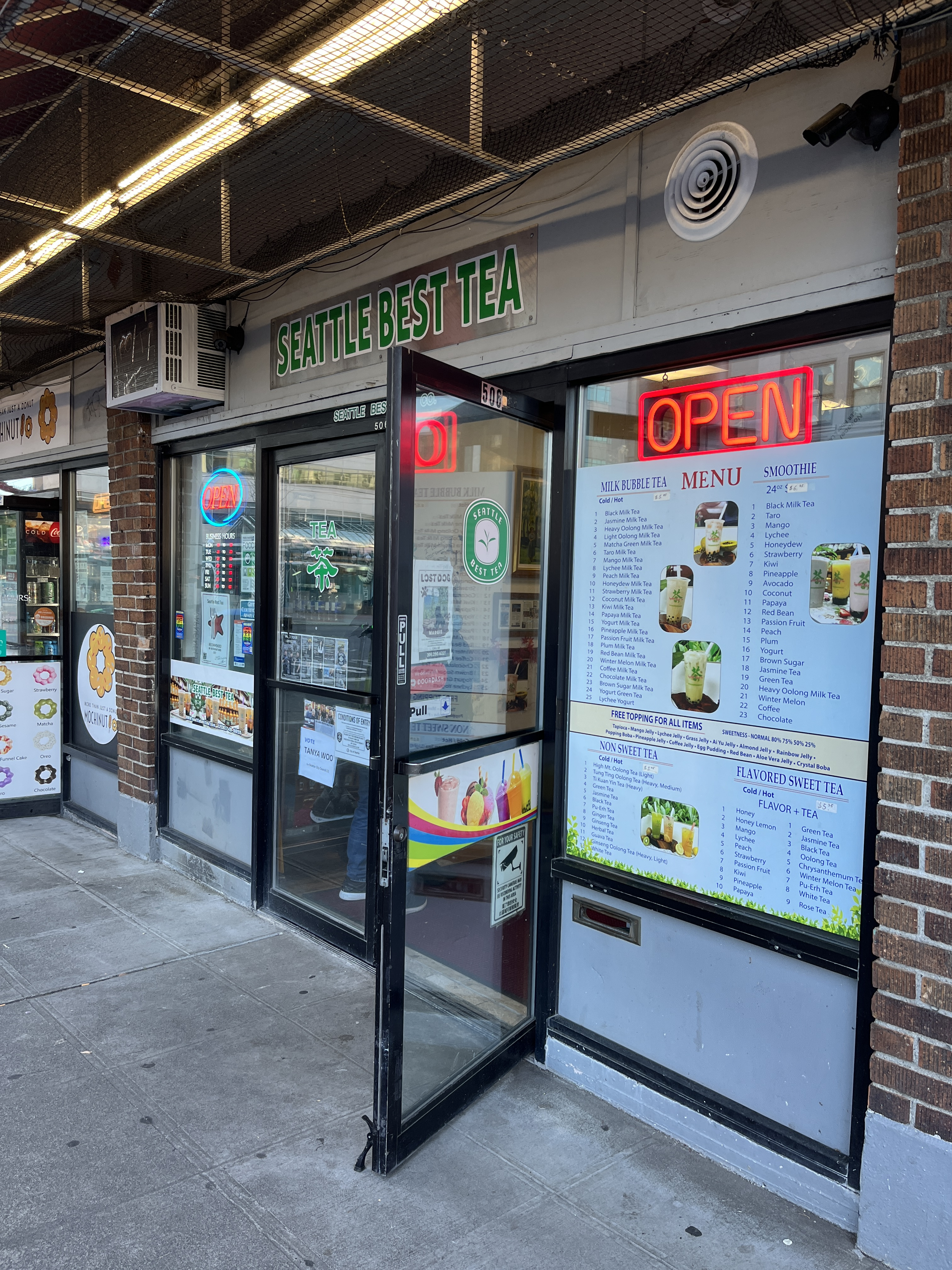
- Exterior of the tea shop in Seattle's Chinatown–International District, 2023
- Interactive map of Seattle Best Tea

Restaurant information
- Established: 1996
- Owners: Lydia Lin; Joe Hsu
- Location: 506 S King Street, Seattle, King, Washington, 98104, United States
- Coordinates: 47.5985°N 122.3273°W
- Other locations: 4505 University Way NE; Seattle, Washington 98105
- Website: seattlebesttea.com

Seattle Best Tea is a family-owned business operating two tea shops in Seattle, in the U.S. state of Washington. Lydia Lin and Joe Hsu opened the original shop in the Chinatown–International District in 1996, followed by a second in the University District in 2023. The shops focus on oolong and offer products made from traditional Taiwanese and Chinese teas, including loose-leaf blends and drinks like bubble tea. Seattle Best Tea has garnered a positive reception, especially for its bubble tea, and is regarded as one of the city's best tea shops.

== Description ==
Seattle Best Tea is a family- and Taiwanese-owned business operating two tea shops in Seattle. The original Taiwanese-style tea shop is located on S King Street, near the Historic Chinatown Gate in the Chinatown–International District (CID), and a second operates in the University District. The shops offer a large selection of loose-leaf blends, including black, green, jasmine, and white varieties, and sell drinks on site, such as bubble tea (also known as boba) and other milk teas. The business focuses on high-mountain tea (oolong) and offers products made from traditional Taiwanese and Chinese teas. Seattle Best Tea has also carried tea-flavored ice cream.

== History ==
Spouses Lydia Lin and Joe Hsu opened the original shop in the CID in 1996, after moving to Seattle in 1992 and identifying a lack of tea shops. According to Taylor Zachary of The Daily of the University of Washington, the tea house initially sold loose-leaf teas and added bubble tea to the menu in 2008. In 2017, the Wing Luke Museum presented an exhibition called "What's in your cup? Community-Brewed Culture". The exhibit featured Lin's personal story which, according to the North American Post, "[invited] the public to experience Chinese culture through tea and how 'drinking tea shortens the distance between people'".

The original shop has offered educational classes, which were paused during the COVID-19 pandemic. Upon learning of potential light rail construction by Sound Transit, owners opened a second location in the University District in 2023. The original location remains at risk of displacement because of transit planning. Seattle Best Tea has been a vendor at the Night Market, an annual street market organized by the Chinatown International District Business Improvement Area. The business participated in the University District's Food Walk in 2023.

== Reception ==
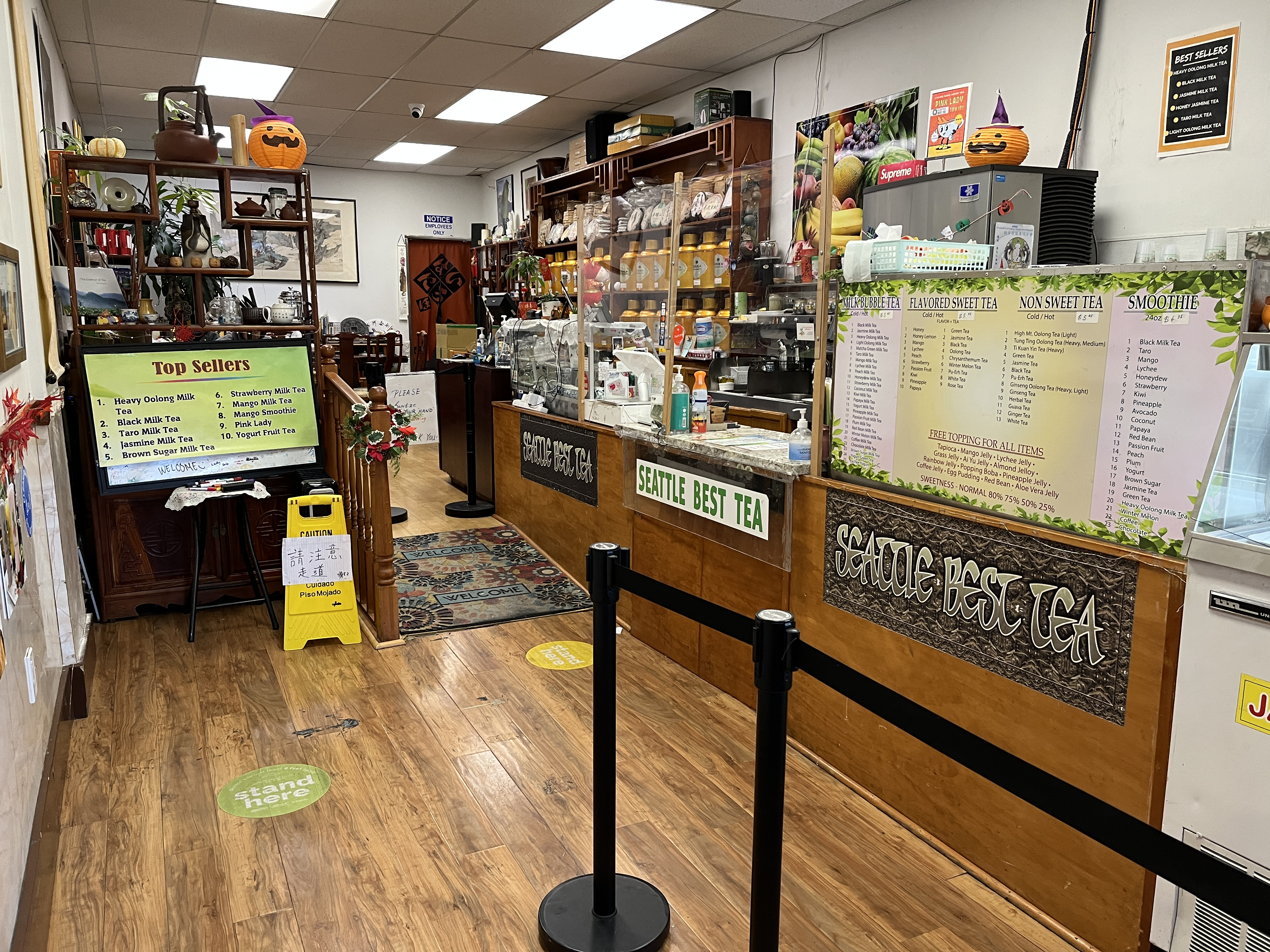
Interior of the Chinatown–International District shop in 2023

A guide book of Seattle published by Lonely Planet says the business is "aptly named" and offers some of the CID's best bubble tea. In a 2013 city guide, ABC News said Seattle Best Tea was among the tea establishments with "high marks". In 2021, The Seattle Times recommended the business "if you want the perfect cup of tea". Christina Ausley included Seattle Best Tea in Seattle Metropolitan's 2018 list of the city's nine "essential" tea shops. The magazine's Ann Karneus included the business in a 2022 overview of sixteen recommended boba shops.

Seattle Best Tea ranked first in Seattle Post-Intelligencer's 2019 list of the city's best bubble tea, based on Yelp data. In Eater Seattle's 2020 overview of recommended eateries for hot tea, Dylan Joffe said Seattle Best Tea is "one of the friendliest places in the city to learn about leaves". Ryan Lee and Jade Yamazaki Stewart called the business a "neighborhood gem" in the website's 2022 list of the metropolitan area's best boba shops, and called the heavy oolong milk tea "a crowd favorite". Aleenah Ansari included the business in Eater Seattle's 2025 overview of the city's best bubble tea shops. Seattle Best Tea has also been highlighted as one of Seattle's women-owned businesses.

== See also ==
- Chinese tea culture
- List of restaurant chains in the United States
- Taiwanese tea culture
