= Pan de Manila =

Philippine bakery chain

- Type: Private
- Industry: Food and beverage
- Founded: 1999; 27 years ago
- Headquarters: Quezon City, Philippines
- Area served: Philippines
- Website: pandemanila.com.ph

Pan de Manila Food Co. Inc. (d/b/a Pan de Manila) is a bakery chain based in the Philippines.

== History ==
Pan de Manila was established in 1999. In 2015, Pan de Manila upgraded its stores starting in branches located in commercial and retail areas.

In December 2021, Pan de Manila replied to a customer query stating that a supporter of the Robredo-Pangilinan campaign made a bulk purchase and added the tandem's logo on their products. It also emphasized that such packaging did not originate from them.

== Partnerships ==
Pan de Manila partners with various Filipino artists since 2008 and features their artwork though its packaging.

Pan de Manila partnered with Fruitas Holdings in 2020 to distribute the latter's fruit juice brands in its branches. In 2023, Pan de Manila collaborated with Serenitea in releasing the latter's Christmas-themed drinks based on the former's ube halaya and yema spreads.

== Products ==
Pan de Manila sells pandesal, other specialty breads and products such as spreads and ice cream. It also operates a chain of restaurants and cafes under the Merienda by Pan de Manila sub-brand.
