= One bowl with two pieces =

Hong Kong meal

One bowl with two pieces (Chinese: 一盅兩件; Jyutping: jat1 zung1 loeng2 gin6) is a term that has long been in the vernacular of Hong Kong tea culture, meaning a bowl of tea with two "delicacies to complement the tea", i.e. dim sum. In Cantonese restaurants of the past, tea was not offered in a present-day teapot but in a bowl. The dim sum was not bite-sized. Instead, quite a number of them were simply big buns, such that two of them easily filled up one's stomach. An example is chicken ball dai bao (雞球大包. lit. 'Chicken Ball Big Bun', meaning a bun with chicken filling).

In modern terms, the "two pieces" normally refers to har gow (蝦餃) and siu mai (燒賣). The concept has been influenced by the "bite-sized trend".
