= Hong Kong tea culture =

Regional tea culture

The tea-drinking habits of Hong Kong residents derive from Chinese tea culture, primarily the Cantonese traditions such as yum cha. Because of Hong Kong's period as a British colony, Hong Kong tea culture is distinct from the tea culture of the mainland. The uniqueness of its tea culture applies both to the tea itself, and also the underlying social and cultural values.

== History of teahouses in Hong Kong ==
The first teahouse in Hong Kong was established at the end of the 19th century. At that time people bought tea leaves from tea houses so that they could serve tea to visiting guests. Tea would be brewed at the beginning of the day and would be served as guests arrived during the day. At night, the remaining tea would be poured away. They did this whether or not visitors actually arrived. This gave rise to the idiom "Tea is for pouring away."

In contemporary society, Hong Kong people buy tea at teahouses not only for serving their guests, but also for themselves.

== Ritual of tea drinking in Hong Kong – "morning tea and newspaper" ==
Hong Kong is a place with plenty of night life. In contrast, streets are almost empty from seven to eight in the morning. Most shops open at or after nine o'clock in the morning, whereas Cantonese restaurants open at about six or even earlier (restaurants in the Western District open at about 4:00 a.m.). The working class of Hong Kong usually have breakfast in these Cantonese restaurants in the early morning. They enjoy 一盅兩件 (Lit. One bowl with two pieces, meaning a cup of tea with two Dim sums) and they read newspapers in the morning before they go to work. Many elderly people bring their caged birds to restaurants and chat with others. They can spend a whole morning doing this.

== Hong Kong style tea – milk tea ==
The unique taste of Hong Kong milk tea is a blend of strong Ceylon black tea with other teas mixed with milk. The addition of milk to tea was introduced during the British colonial period.

== Flagstaff House Museum of Tea Ware ==
The Flagstaff House Museum of Tea Ware is a branch museum of the Hong Kong Museum of Art, located centrally in Hong Kong Park. It is a place for collecting, studying and displaying tea ware and holding regular presentation or demonstration lectures to promote Chinese tea drinking culture. Many famous Yixing teapots are exhibited in the museum.

== See also ==
- Taiwanese tea culture
