= Comebuytea =

Chain of bubble tea restaurants

COMEBUYTEA

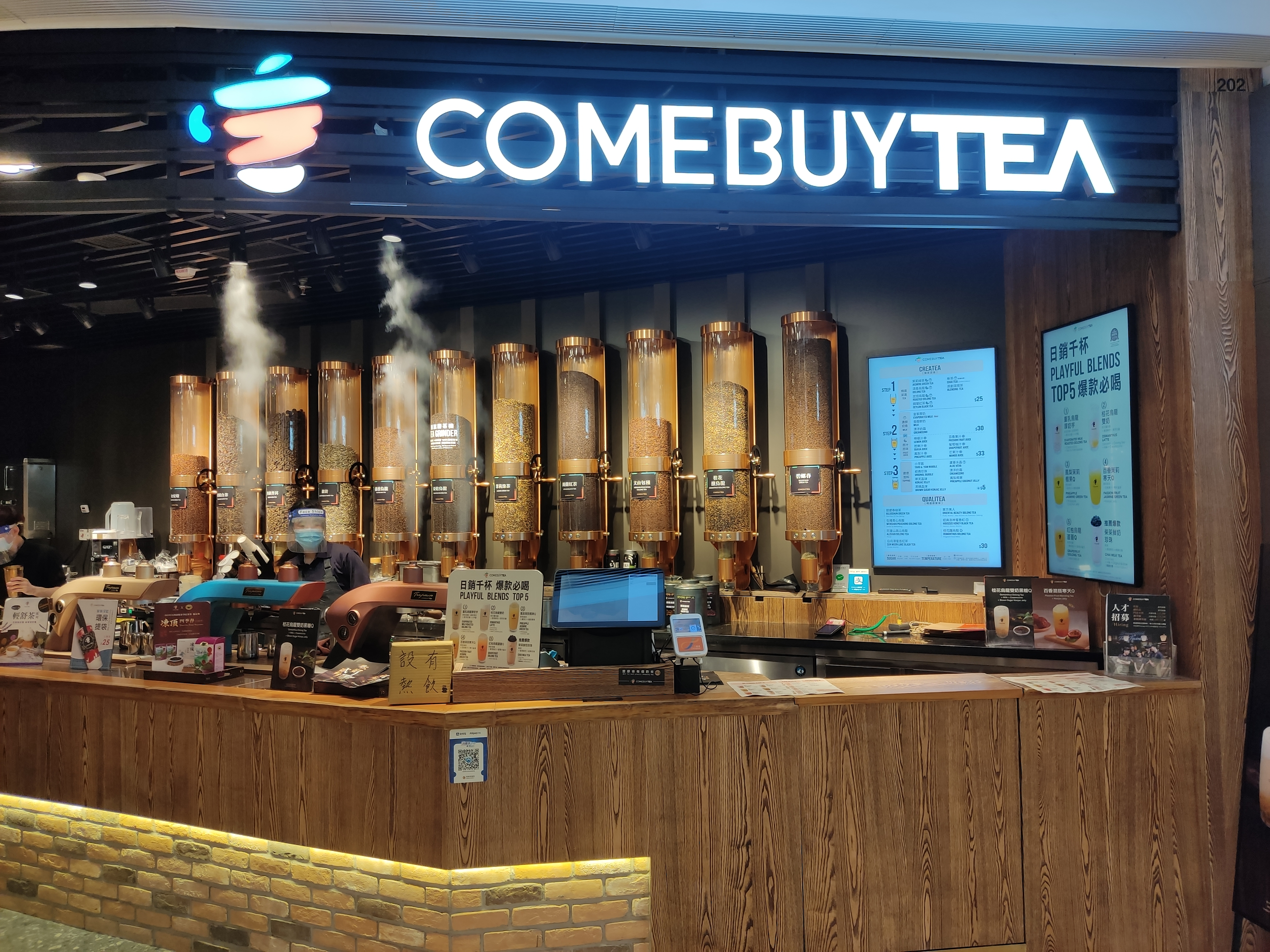
- A shop in Hong Kong in 2022
- Type: Private
- Industry: Bubble tea restaurant franchise
- Founded: 2002; 24 years ago in Taipei, Taiwan
- Headquarters: Taipei, Taiwan
- Number of locations: 300+ (2024)

Comebuytea is a chain of bubble tea restaurants. Established in 2002, the company operates in Taipei, Hong Kong, and the United States. Comebuytea uses "teaspresso" machines.

== United States ==
Comebuytea's only location in the United States is in Seattle. The business has operated at the intersection of Broadway and Pike, on Capitol Hill, since 2024. Comebuytea has also operated at The Shops at Mission Viejo, in Mission Viejo, California.
