= Drip Tea =

Restaurant and concept store in Seattle, Washington, U.S.

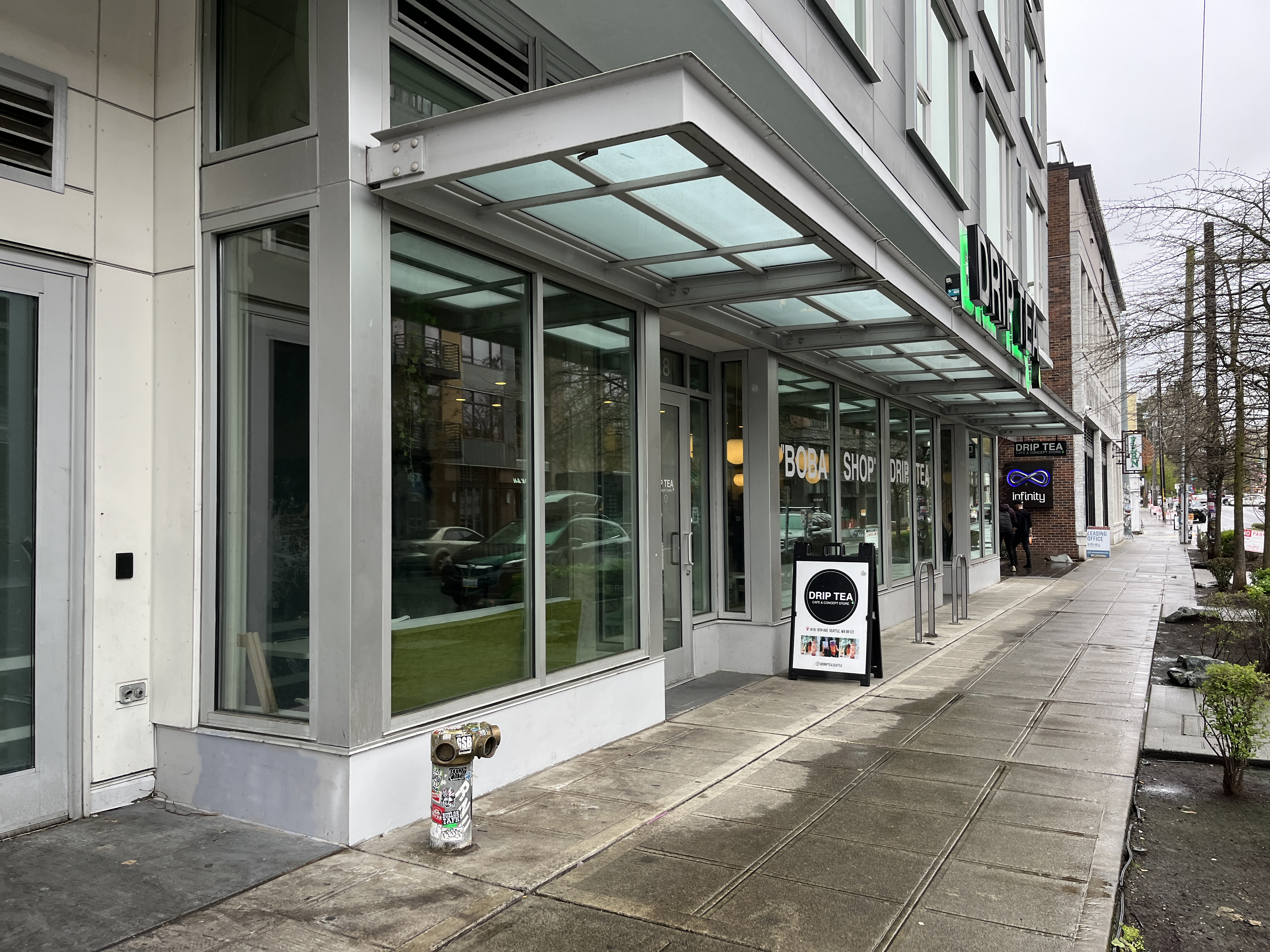
- The cafe's exterior in April 2024
- Interactive map of Drip Tea

Restaurant information
- Owners: Paul Kwon; Justin Ngyuen; Lena Phan
- Location: 1416 10th Avenue, Seattle, King, Washington, 98122, United States
- Coordinates: 47.6133°N 122.3193°W

Drip Tea is a bubble tea (or boba) cafe and concept store, called Drip Tea Market, in Seattle, Washington. The business operates on Capitol Hill, and sells boba and desserts, as well as clothing and sneakers.

Owned by Paul Kwon, Justin Ngyuen, and Lena Phan, Drip Tea opened in February 2020, prior to the arrival of the COVID-19 pandemic. Upon opening, the business was popular and queues formed for entry.

Drip Tea has garnered a positive reception, especially for its bubble teas and signature Bearyaki, a bear-shaped taiyaki (waffle) with soft-serve ice cream.

== Description ==
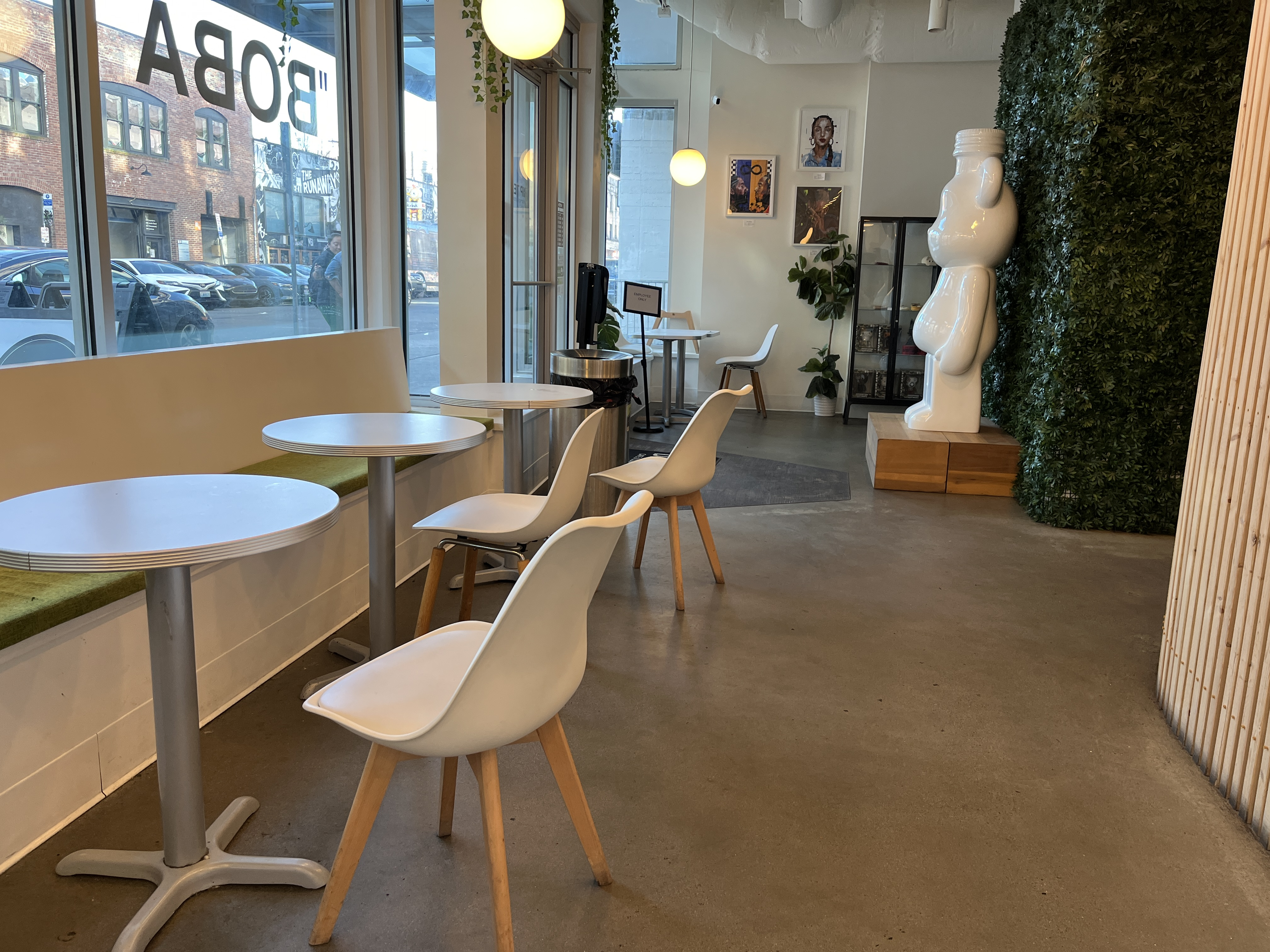
The cafe's interior, 2024

Drip Tea has been described as a "hypebeast" and "Instagram-friendly" bubble tea (or boba) shop on 10th Avenue, at the intersection of Pike Street, on Seattle's Capitol Hill. Eater Seattle has described Drip Tea as a "half café/half trendy retail store" that offers boba and clothes. The Spectator has said the business operates "with a semi-hype beast slant".

The cafe's interior has limited seating and features a statue with a backdrop of plastic cannabis leaves. It has an area designated for retail, especially trendy clothing brands such as Chrome Hearts, Supreme, and Yeezy. The affiliated concept store Drip Tea Market sells clothes and sneakers.

=== Menu ===
In addition to bubble teas, Drip Tea offers desserts with soft-serve ice cream. The Bearyaki is a bear-shaped taiyaki (waffle) filled with soft-serve. Dough options for the Bearyaki include standard, charcoal, funfetti, Nutella, Oreo, or red bean, and ice cream flavors include pandan, ube, and vanilla. Topping options include cocoa or fruity pebbles, cotton candy-flavored sprinkles, crumbled Oreos, and matcha or strawberry dust. The Tiger Boba sundae has ube or vanilla soft-serve with tapioca pearls and a drizzle of syrup made from brown sugar.

The cafe's "designer" drinks are "whimsically named after clothing brands and artists", according to Eater Seattle. The Babycat is a smoothie with taro and Oreo, and the Post Melona was inspired by the fruit-flavored ice cream bar Melona. The Fear of Pog is a smoothie with guava, orange, and passion fruit, with a name that references the brand Fear of God. The Heart Eyes has matcha, strawberry milk, and strawberries. The No. 5 Elixir has activated charcoal, mango lemonade, and mango pieces. There is also a green apple smoothie. For an additional cost, drinks can be served in a "Kaws-like" bear-shaped bottle.

== History ==
Drip Tea is owned by Paul Kwon, Justin Ngyuen, and Lena Phan. The cafe opened in 2020, before the COVID-19 pandemic, in the space previously occupied by an outpost of Sweet Iron. A soft opening was held on February 17. During the soft launch, which lasted until March 7, the business operated from 3pm to 10pm, and closed for a day to add new menu items and reassess pricing. New ownership was pending, as of August 2026.

== Reception ==
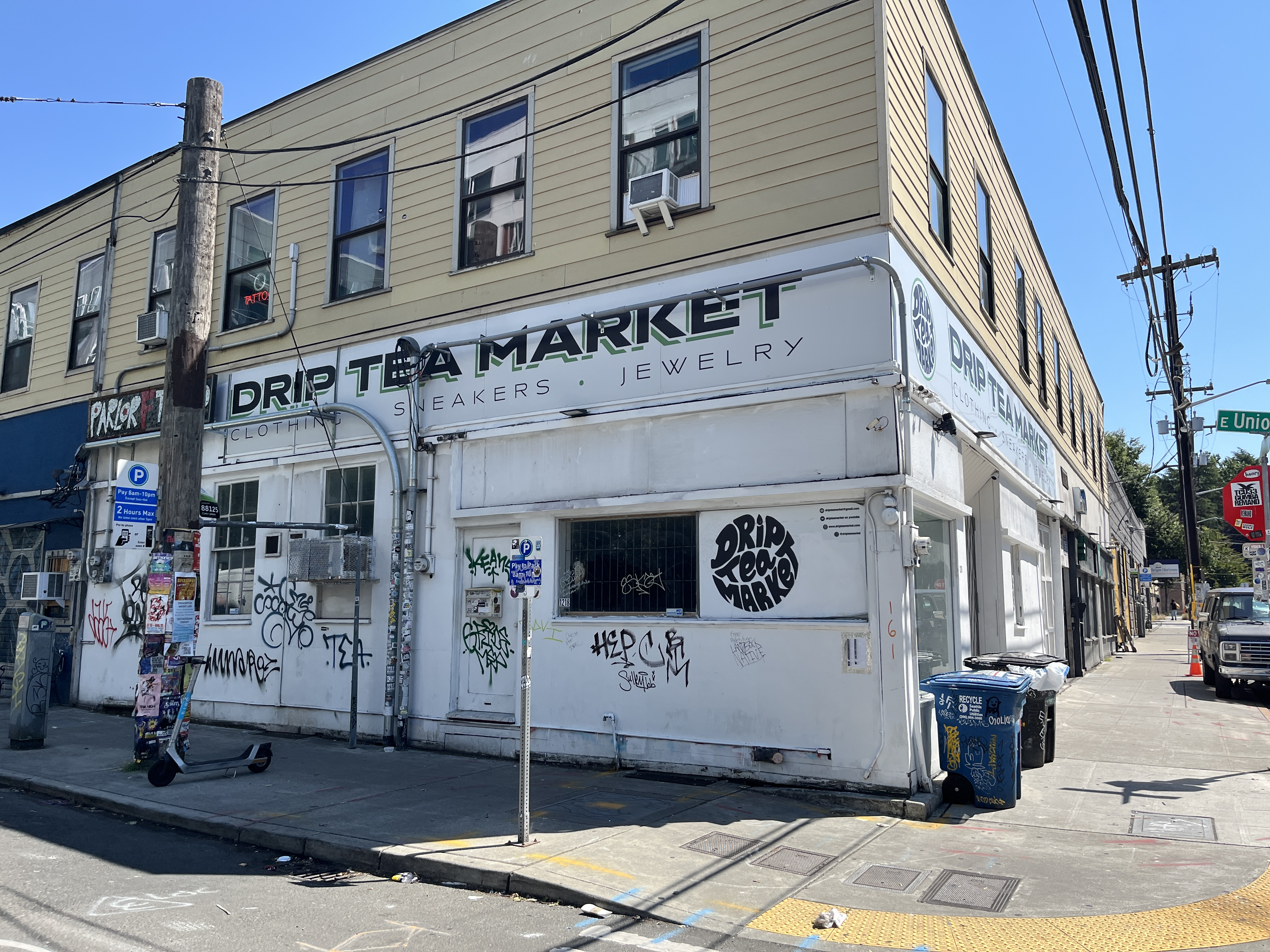
Exterior of Drip Tea Market, 2024

Upon opening, Drip Tea was popular and patrons formed queues for entry. The Seattle Post-Intelligencer described the cafe as "a hotspot for young people looking to add to their Instagram clout with a picture of the store's unique, signature item: bearyaki". The newspaper's Callie Craighead said Drip Tea "[made] a huge buzz" and recommended, "before consuming, be sure to snap a shot of your picture-perfect dessert for social media". In February 2020, Allecia Vermillion of Seattle Metropolitan wrote, "I'm calling it now: This will be the summer of bearyaki." Ann Karneus included Drip Tea in the magazine's 2022 list of sixteen boba shops "worth a sip" in the city.

Ryan Lee and Jade Yamazaki Stewart included Drip Tea in Eater Seattle's 2022 overview of sixteen "thirst-quenching boba shops to try" in the Seattle metropolitan area. Aleenah Ansari included the business in the website's 2025 overview of the city's best bubble tea shops. The Infatuation's Aimee Rizzo said the Tiger Boba sundaie "could totally beat up a hot fudge sundae in a street fight", and opined, "the yam-and-brown-sugar situation gets us excited for Thanksgiving no matter what time of year it is." The Spectator called Drip Tea "a haven for self-proclaimed boba lovers, with more than just the milk tea to bring customers in". Seattle Refined's Zervacki Thei recommended the black milk tea boba.
