= Taiwanese tea culture =

Tea culture of Taiwan

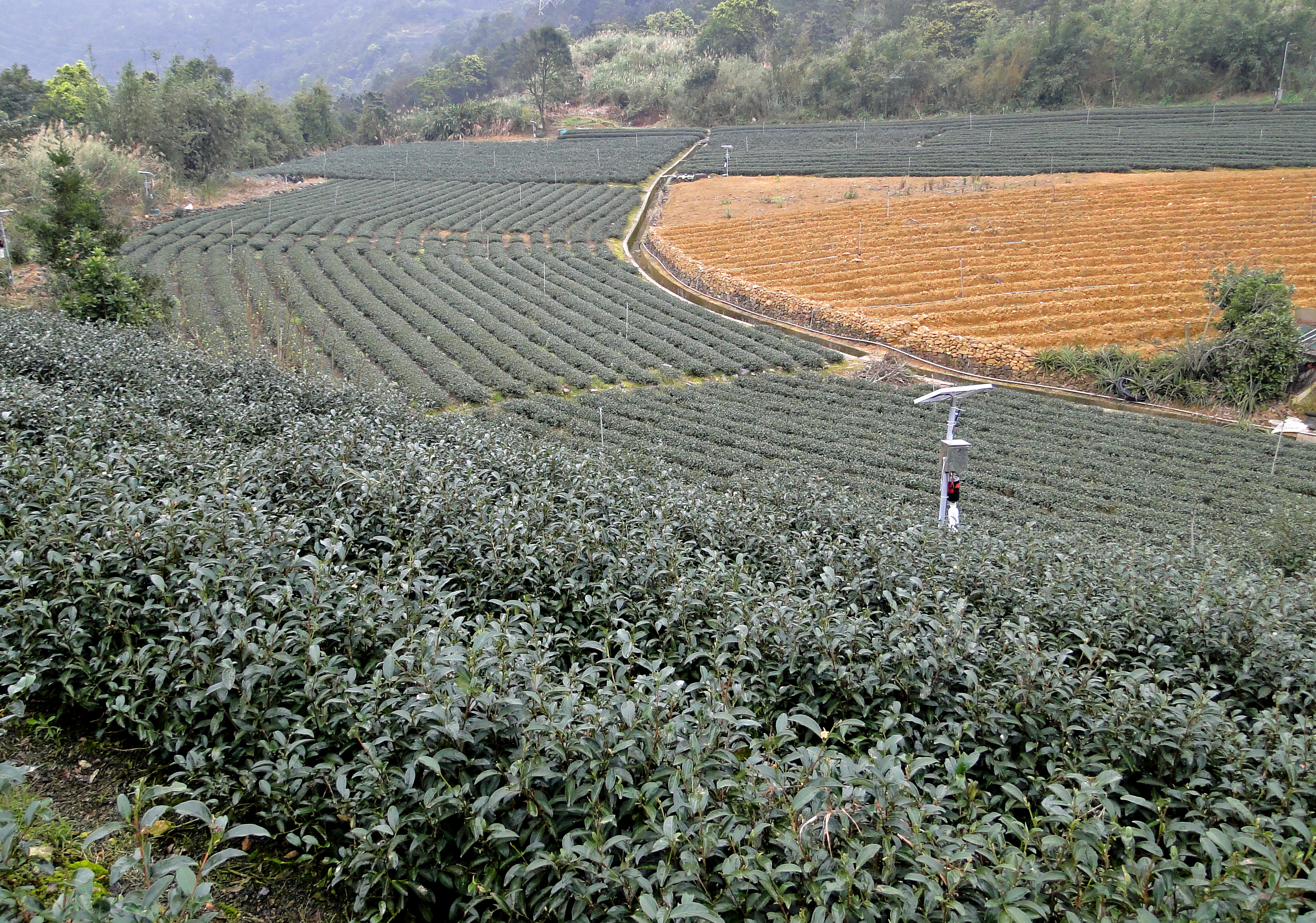
Tea plantation in Pinglin District

Taiwanese tea culture includes tea arts, traditional tea ceremonies, and the social aspects of tea consumption in Taiwan. Its roots can be traced back to Chinese tea culture. Many of the classical arts can be seen in the tea culture, such as calligraphy, flower arts, and incense arts. Tea, especially oolong tea, is a popular drink in Taiwan, and teahouses, or "tea-arts" shops, are common.

== History ==
The roots of Taiwanese tea culture are Chinese. Its beginning is generally traced to the early 19th century (1796–1820), when Ke Chao (柯朝) brought tea seeds from Fujian and planted them in the outskirts of Taipei. According to another account, during the Xianfeng era (1851–1861), Lin Fengchi (林鳳池), a native of Lugu Township in Nantou County, brought back cuttings of oolong tea plants after taking the imperial examinations in Fujian and planted them in Taiwan; these are regarded as the origin of Dongding oolong.

Building on these beginnings, the British merchant John Dodd established tea production in Taipei as a commercial business in the 19th century, and in 1881 Wu Fuyuan (吳福源), a tea merchant from Quanzhou, Fujian, built a factory for producing Pouchong (Baozhong) tea. Exports to the British market grew steadily until the early 20th century, and the Taiwanese tea industry entered its heyday after the First World War. During this period, summer-picked Taiwanese oolong presented to the British royal family gained popularity and came to be called "Oriental Beauty" (Dongfang meiren) for its sweet, alluring aroma.

The development of a unique tea culture has also been influenced by its climate and the landscape. In particular, development has been spurred by the high mountains.

The island country's tea arts are Chinese that have been influenced by western culture. Gongfu tea ceremony is informally referred to as laoren cha, or "old man tea", which originated in China and has flourished in Taiwan.

Traditionally, emphasis has been placed on single-origin teas, but, in the 21st century, high-quality blended teas gained prominence. Traditional xun tea making, that is, making tea from dried petals or stamens, has also experienced a resurgence.

== Tea culture and studies education ==
- Tatung Institute of Commerce and Technology
- Lu-Yu Tea Culture Institute
- Tea Research and Extension Station

== See also ==
- Bubble tea, invented in Taiwan
- Chinese tea culture
- Ding Tea
- Gongfu tea ceremony
- Japanese tea ceremony
- Hong Kong tea culture
- Taiwanese cuisine
- Taiwanese tea
