= Sharetea =

Chain of bubble tea shops

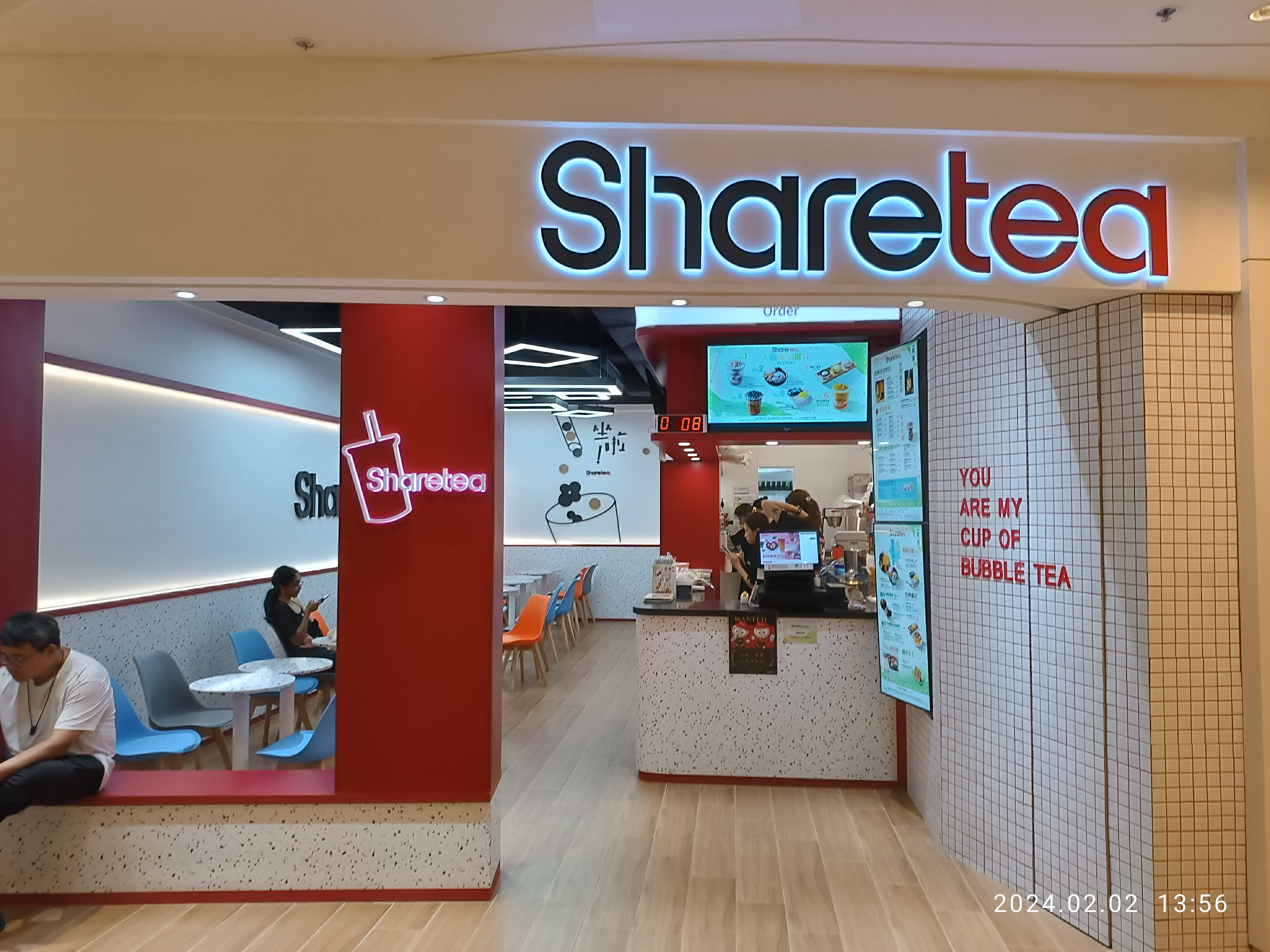
- Shop in Hong Kong, 2024

Sharetea is a Taiwanese bubble tea chain founded in Taipei, Taiwan, in 1992. The company is owned by Lian Fa International Dining Business Corporation and operates internationally through franchise arrangements. It's menu includes milk teas, fruit teas, smoothies, and other tea based beverages. By 2025, Sharetea had expanded to more than 500 locations worldwide, according to figures reported by Taiwanese news publications.

== History ==
Interior of a shop in Seattle's Chinatown–International District, 2024

Sharetea was founded in 1992 by Cheng Kai-Lung in Taipei, Taiwan. Before establishing the business, Cheng worked as a director in the film and television industry. He later left his career to start to a tea-vending business, which eventually developed into Sharetea. The business initially operated as a black tea stall on Nanyang Street in Taipei. In 2004, Lian Fa International Dining Business Corporation, the company that owns Sharetea, was established.

Sharetea began expanding its franchise operations in Taiwan in 2006. In 2010, the company expanded into Hong Kong and Singapore. It subsequently entered other international markets, including Australia, Malaysia, the Philippines, and the United Arab Emirates. By 2013, Sharetea had also expanded into the United Kingdom, United States, and Canada. In 2015, Lian Fa established its American subsidiary, Lilian USA LLC.

By January 2022, Sharetea operated more than 350 locations across 13 markets worldwide. The United States was it's largest market, with 125 stores, followed by Hong Kong with 44 and Taiwan with 22. Then, on January 14, 2022, Sharetea's parent company, Lian Fa International, was scheduled to begin trading on Taiwan's Emerging Stock Board. According to Sharetea's website, the chain operates more than 400 stores worldwide, including in 4 different continents like Australia, Europe, Asia, Canada, and Middle East, and 12 different countries.

In September 2025, Lian Fa International announced plans to restructure Sharetea's operations in Taiwan after the franchise agreements for its remaining stores were due to expire. The company stated that the changes were part of a plan to reposition the brand, rather than withdraw from the Taiwanese market. It also announced plans to introduce a revised store format in 2026.

== Operations ==
A bubble milk tea in 2024

Sharetea operates internationally through franchise arrangements. It's parent company, Lian Fa International Dining Business Corporation, is based in Taiwan. The company has expanded it's retail presence into markets across Asian, North America, Europe, and Australia.

Sharetea is a brand of Taiwan-based Lian Fa International Dining Business Corporation. Cheng Kai-Lung, who founded Sharetea in 1992, was identified as chairman of Lian Fa International in December 2025. In addition to Sharetea, the company operates other food and beverage brands, including UG "Unique Green" Tea.

== Products and menu ==
Sharetea primarily serves Taiwanese bubble tea and other tea-based beverages. Its menu includes milk teas, brewed teas, fruit teas, and ice-blended drinks. Customers can select from various toppings, including tapioca pearls, pudding, and jelly. Some beverages are also offered with a creamy cheese foam topping known as Creama. You can customize the sweetness and ice level in most drinks in their stores.

== Legal matters ==
=== Australian workplace investigation ===
In June 2023, Australia's Fair Work Ombudsman reported recovering A$89,952 in unpaid wages for 36 workers following investigations of 14 Sharetea franchise outlets. The regulator found that 9 of the investigated outlets had failed to meet all their obligations under applicable workplace awards. The investigation did not find that Sharetea Australia Pty Ltd, the franchisor, was involved in the identified violations.
