= Tapioca Express =

Taiwanese-American fast food franchise chain

- Tapioca Express at Millbrae, California. (currently closed)
- Type: Private
- Industry: Fast food
- Founded: Alhambra, California, United States 1999
- Headquarters: South El Monte, California, United States
- Number of locations: 22
- Areas served: California, Washington, Texas
- Website: tapiocaexpress.com

Tapioca Express (品客多; pinyin: Pǐnkèduō) is a Taiwanese-American fast food franchise chain specializing in bubble tea, coffee, a variety of fruit juices and slushes, and small meals and light snacks. The first store opened in Alhambra, California in 1999. As of 2018, the company is headquartered in South El Monte, California, and has locations in California, Texas, and Washington. Tapioca Express follows a franchise model and requires franchise owners to purchase supplies and ingredients only from the corporate headquarters, ensuring similar standards for all locations.

== History ==
Tapioca Express was first founded in August 1999 in Alhambra, California, within Los Angeles County. The company soon expanded, with two more stores opening in Northern California in 2000. These two were both franchises, setting the model for future expansion of the brand. As Tapioca Express grew in popularity, so did their menu selection. By 2002, they had over a hundred drink choices and Italian Expresso was introduced into all stores. By the end of 2002, Tapioca Express had over 45 franchises, extending beyond their original home state of California. Tapioca Express had goals to open over 100 franchises by 2009, however, the 2008 recession caused many stores to shut down, putting the company in a delicate situation financially. The company then was restructured in year 2009 and regained its margin and market share about 40% annual growth from year 2010 to 2014. As of July 2018, Tapioca Express has 38 locations in California, Washington, and Texas.

== Drinks & foods ==
Tapioca Express is known for bringing the boba drink culture to the United States in the late 90s. Since then, they have introduced over 100 drinks to their menu, ranging from a variety of juice, tea, coffee and of course milk tea drinks. Their trademark items are the "Snow Bubble" and "Yogurt Frost". Food items include crispy chicken, crispy chicken wrap, calamari rings and pot stickers, as well as other various Taiwanese snacks.

== Press & awards ==
Tapioca Express, since its founding in 1999, has received several accolades from various online publications, regional magazines, and business journals. These include its membership in the International Franchise Association and following its Code of Ethics. In 2004 it was ranked number 16 for the Los Angeles Business Journal's 25 Largest Franchisers Award. During the 27th Annual Asian Business Associations (ABA) Banquet and Award Ceremony in 2003, Tapioca Express was awarded their Strength of Teamwork Award.
