= Molly Tea =

Chinese tea chain

- Native name: 茉莉奶白
- Type: Private
- Founder: Zhang Bocheng
- Area served: North America; Europe; Southeast Asia; Australia
- Website: https://usa.mollytea.com/

Molly Tea (Chinese: 茉莉奶白; pinyin: Mòlì Nǎibái; lit. 'jasmine milk white') is a Chinese tea chain that specializes in flower and jasmine milk teas. It is known for its "traditional, culture-centric image and marketing" and has opened many locations in China and abroad.

In 2026, the brand was embroiled in controversy after it sued and cut ties with its New York locations and lost a trademark dispute with French luxury fashion house Louis Vuitton.

== Name ==
The name Molly Tea is derived from the Mandarin 茉莉 (pinyin: mòlì), meaning jasmine, sounding similar to the English name Molly.

== History ==
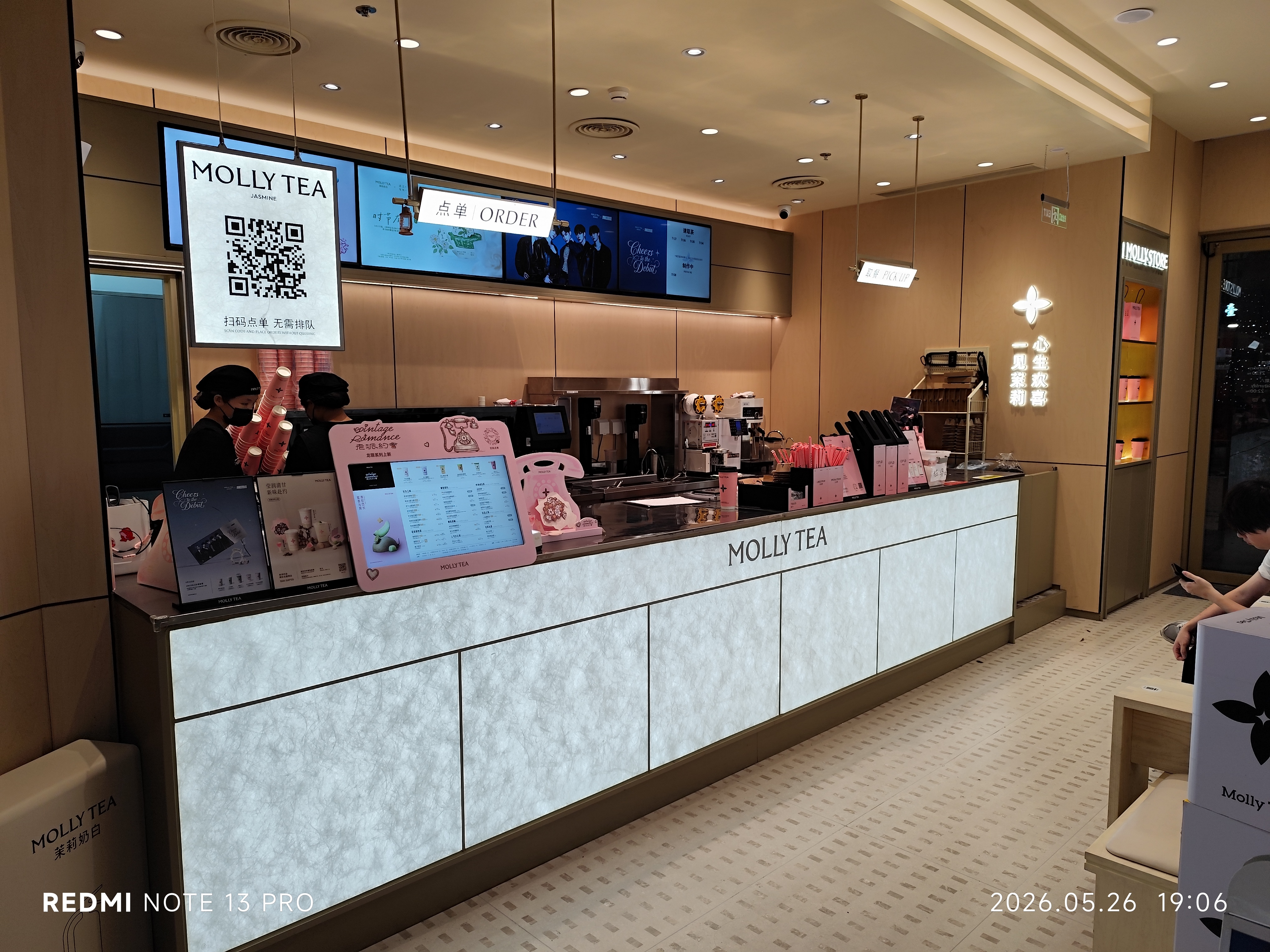
A Molly Tea store in Shenzhen

In 2021, Molly Tea opened its first store in Shenzhen by Zhang Bocheng, with an emphasis in making floral milk teas, specifically jasmine milk teas.

Molly Tea's first storefront in the United States was in Flushing, Queens of New York, after which it opened storefronts in Brooklyn, New York and the San Francisco Bay Area in California. In 2025, Molly Tea's Chicago location in Chinatown became "the first milk tea brand from mainland China to open a branch in Chicago." Throughout 2024–2025, other locations opened in the United States in Bellevue, Washington; Houston, Texas; and other cities.

Molly Tea locations also opened in Toronto and Edmonton throughout 2025, and Richmond opening April 18, 2026 in Canada. Molly Tea also debuted in London, United Kingdom in early 2025, and other stores have appeared in Australia, Thailand, and other countries. As of October 2024, Molly Tea had 785 locations globally, with plans to open over 300 more stores around the world by the end of 2025.

== Collaborations ==
In 2024, Molly Tea collaborated with French cosmetics brand L'Oréal on a "set menu" where Molly Tea customers could receive a L'Oréal mask, as well as prize opportunities, upon purchasing a champaca or lychee champaca tea.

== Legal disputes ==
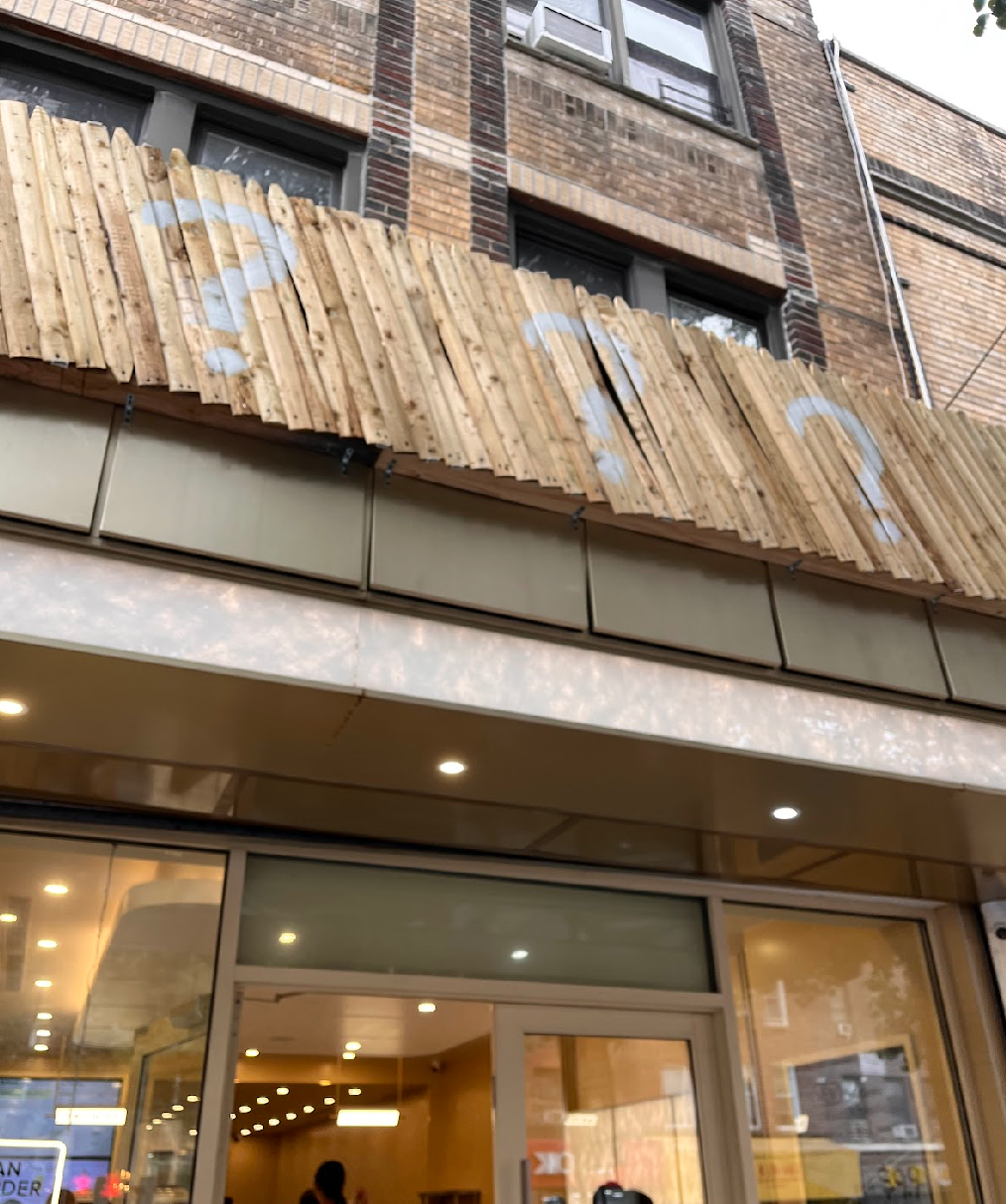
? Tea in Brooklyn, New York

=== New York franchises ===
On May 15, 2026, a lawsuit was filed by Shenzhen Molly Tea, suing Molly Tea New York due to several establishments breaching contract and disputes over profit-sharing. As a result, locations in New York and California shut down completely or operate under a different name. In a publicity stunt, many locations in New York now display boarded up signs and have temporarily rebranded to ? Tea.

=== Louis Vuitton ===
In 2025, luxury fashion brand Louis Vuitton sued a Molly Tea location in Suzhou over their traditional four-petal flower logo being similar to Louis Vuitton's monogram. Molly Tea had filed several trademark applications for the flower logo with the China National Intellectual Property Administration in 2024, but most were rejected. On July 2, 2026, the Suzhou Intermediate People's Court ruled that Molly Tea's flower logo infringed on seven of Louis Vuitton's trademarks and ordered they pay CN¥10.3 million (US$1.5M) in damages and a public apology to be published by Molly Tea on the homepages of all social media platforms.

On social media, Molly Tea changed the color of their black and white logo to purple and gold and confirmed plans to appeal which drew the attention of Chinese netizens. Chinese netizens protested the ruling and criticized the trademark protection laws as unreasonable and overly strict. They ridiculed how anyone could possibly confuse Louis Vuitton's branding with Molly Tea's. Many remarked that Molly Tea's simple four-petal flower design has existed in Chinese culture since the Tang dynasty (618–907) and that Louis Vuitton only adopted their logo in the 19th century, accusing Louis Vuitton of monopolizing ancient cultural symbols and excessive trademark protection.
