= Lollicup Coffee & Tea =

Food retailer and manufacturer

Coordinates: 33.9683°N 117.6701°W

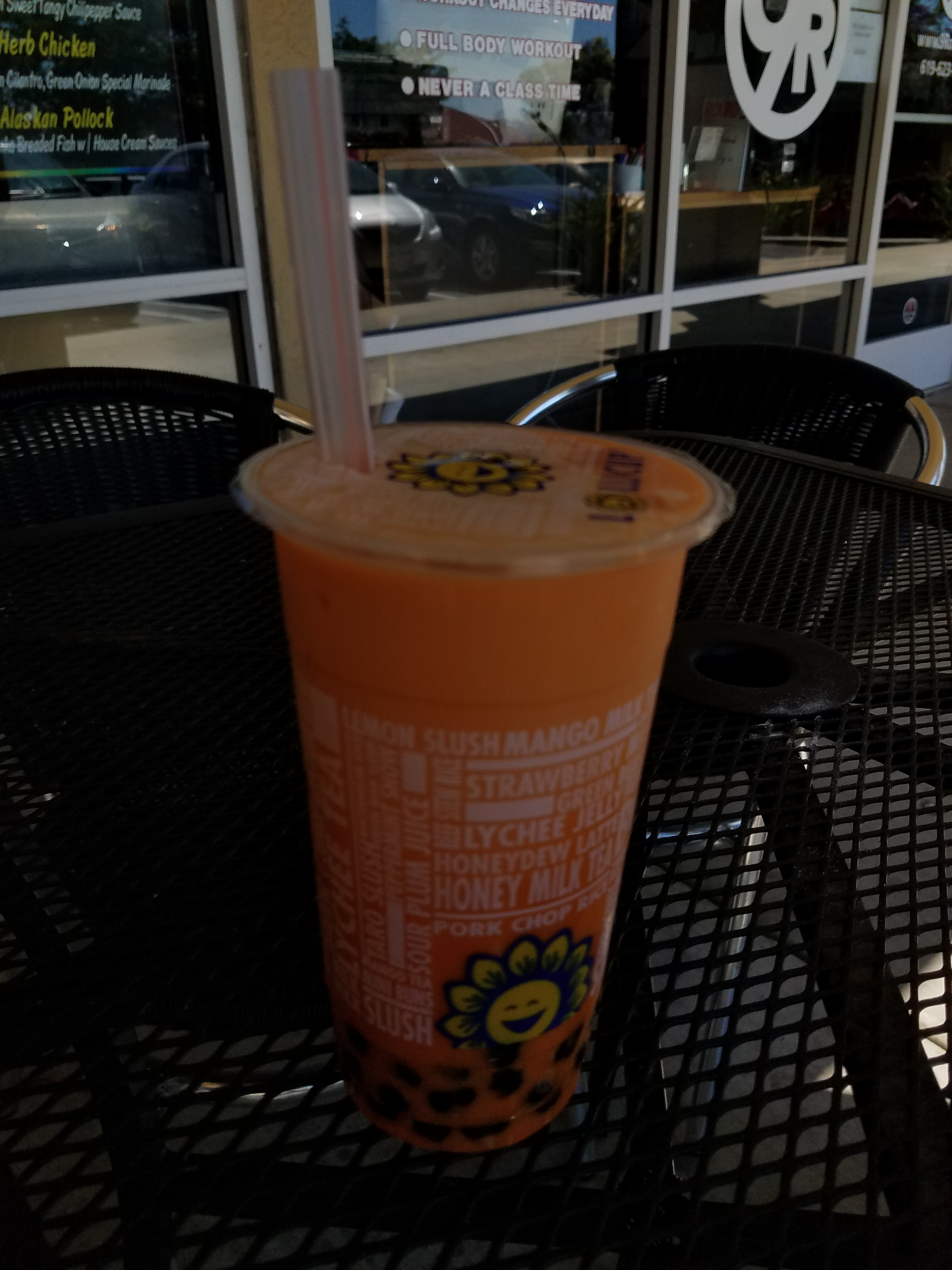
Lollicup

Lollicup Coffee & Tea (Chinese: 樂立杯; pinyin: lè lì bēi), rebranded as Lollicup fresh, is a Taiwanese American chain of tea shops founded by Lollicup USA, Inc., with headquarters in Chino, California. Founded in 2000 by Alan Yu and Marvin Cheng, the company now has locations and franchises in the United States and China. Formerly known as Lollicup Tea Zone, the fastfood chain specializes in bubble tea and coffee.

The company manufactures and distributes edible products including "tea leaves, drink powders, jellies, syrups, sweeteners, and frozen yogurt toppings". As of 2015, the Los Angeles Times reported that Lollicup was distributing 70% of all boba in the United States. Its subsidiary Karat also produces disposable branded plastic and paper cups it sells to other businesses.

== History ==
Following the boba milk tea craze in Taiwan in the 1990s, Chinese American entrepreneur Alan Yu decided to try to popularize the drink in North America. The first Lollicup shop was opened in San Gabriel, California, in 2000. At the time, it was one of the only boba tea shops in the United States, and quickly became popular by word of mouth. Within three months, five more locations opened. In 2015, the company reported opening more than 70 franchise stores within a three-year period.

For a period, Lollicup offered a trademark licensing program, which allowed the licensees (operators) to maintain complete control over the store without having to pay a royalty fee. By 2004, over 150 stores opened nationwide. Due to inconsistency and poor quality control, Lollicup closed its trademark licensing program after many branches closed.

In 2014, Lollicup opened a large manufacturing facility in Chino, California, with 175 employees.

Lollicup USA, Inc., is listed in the Inc. 5000 list of fastest-growing privately held companies in America, with a rank of 2939 for its 3-year growth of 123% and an estimated revenue of $60 million in 2013.

== Locations ==
As of 8 November 2013, a total of 38 branches operate in US and China. With three branches operated by corporate in Alhambra, CA, Los Angeles, and Riverside, CA, corporate opened its first international location in Chengdu, China in 2012. Newer locations have a modern and updated design, featuring digital menu boards and digital promotional screens.

- United States 36 stores
- China 2 stores (Chengdu)
