= CháYì =

Tea beverage brand in the Philippines

- Industry: Tea shop
- Founded: December 2024
- Founder: Winchell Tan
- Headquarters: Manila, Philippines
- Number of locations: 3 (as of August 2025)
- Products: Tea, Tea latte, cold brew tea

CháYì (Chinese: 茶意) is a tea beverage brand based in the Philippines that specializes in authentic Chinese tea and tea lattes. The brand was founded by Winchell Tan to introduce traditional tea culture to the Filipino market using modern brewing methods. Its first location opened in Binondo, Manila, in December 2024.

== History ==
The concept for CháYì was developed by Winchell Tan, who grew up in a family that practiced traditional tea brewing. Tan noticed that most tea shops in the Philippines focused on sugar-heavy milk teas rather than the quality of the tea leaves. He traveled to China to study tea culture and discovered modern tea lattes, which inspired him to bring the concept to Manila.

The name "CháYì" is derived from two Mandarin characters: "Cha" meaning tea, and "Yi" meaning essence. The founder aimed to educate local customers on the history and taste of pure tea. The flagship store opened on the second floor of Lucky Chinatown Mall in Binondo, Manila, in December 2024. By August 2025, the brand expanded to a second location at Venice Grand Canal Mall in Taguig and a third location at Fame Mall in Mandaluyong.

== Products ==
CháYì serves drinks made from tea leaves sourced from the Fujian and Yunnan provinces of China, as well as Sri Lanka. The menu is built around six primary tea bases: White Peach Oolong, Osmanthus Oolong, Artisan Ceylon, Pu'er, Da Hong Pao, and Oriental Jasmine.

The drinks are available as hot teas, cold brews, or tea lattes. The brand uses rock sugar syrup as a sweetener instead of artificial fructose to avoid overpowering the tea flavor. One of their product lines, the "Snowy Series", features tea lattes topped with whipped cream and toasted pecans. The brand also utilizes specific ingredients for flavoring, such as dried white peaches for their Oolong blends rather than fruit syrup. According to the company, their cold brew teas contain zero calories, while the tea lattes contain approximately 200 calories.

== Branding and operations ==
The brand's visual identity uses a blue and white color scheme inspired by traditional Chinese porcelain. The logo is designed to look like a blooming flower styled as an imperial crest. For packaging, the company uses biodegradable straws made from polylactic acid (PLA) that resemble coffee stirrers. Beverages are brewed fresh in the store and are refreshed every four hours to maintain quality.
