= Don't Yell at Me =

Chain of bubble tea shops

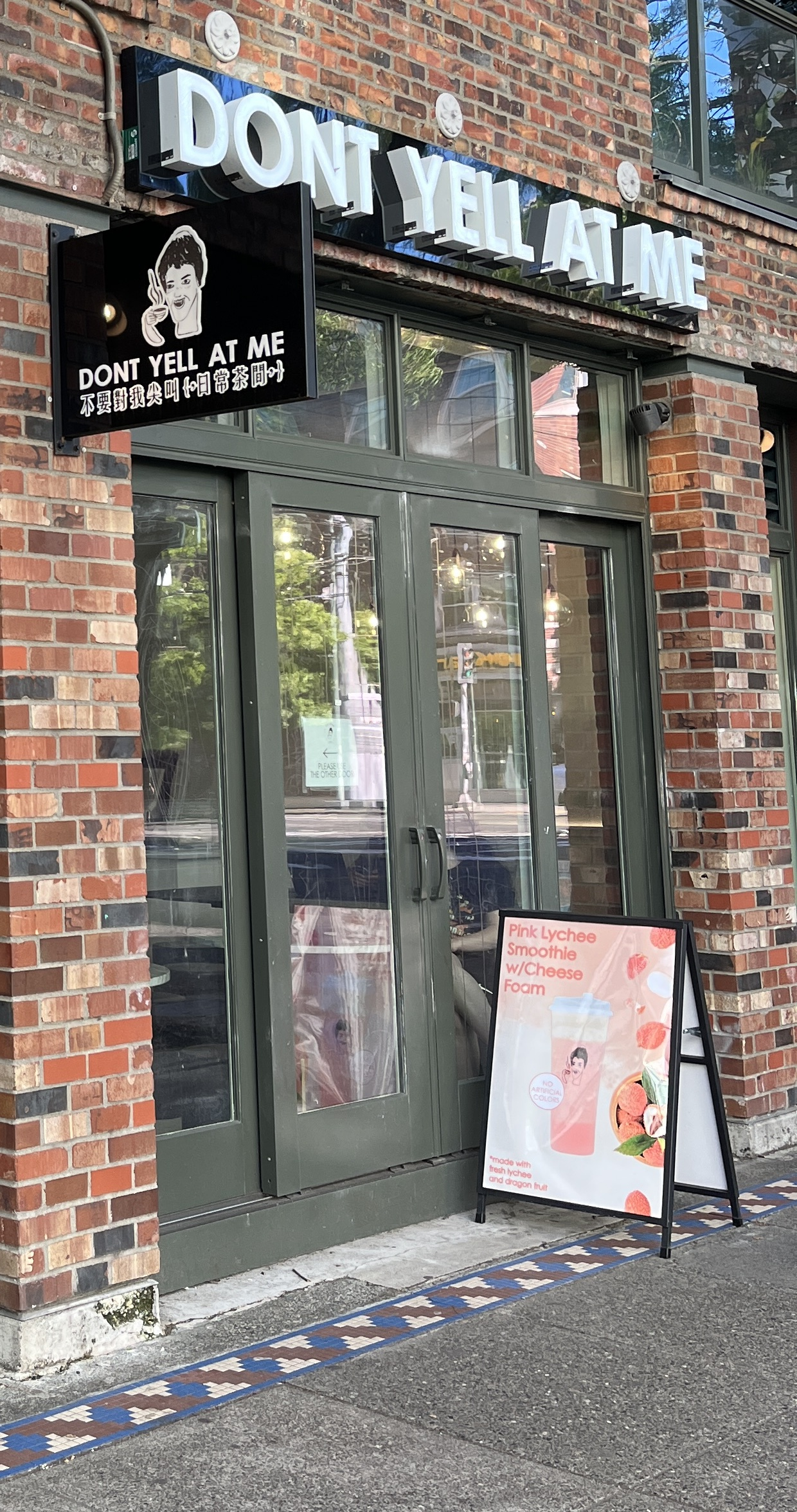
- Exterior of the Seattle shop on Broadway, 2023

Don't Yell at Me is a global chain of bubble tea shops based in Taipei, Taiwan. In addition to other Asian nations, the business has also operated in Canada and the United States.

== Description ==
Don't Yell at Me is a chain of bubble tea shops. Bubble tea varieties have included Taiwanese black tea, rose milk tea, and osmanthus oolong.

== History and locations ==
The business has operated in Hong Kong, Kuala Lumpur, and Tokyo. In Canada, a location opened in Calgary in 2019.

=== United States ===
The first location in the United States operates on University Avenue in Seattle's University District. There is also a location at The Village at Totem Lake in Kirkland, Washington. In 2022, the Seattle shop participated in the city's first boba festival, which was held in the University District to commemorate National Bubble Tea Day. The second location opened on Broadway on Seattle's Capitol Hill in 2022.

== Reception ==
Aleenah Ansari included the business in Eater Seattle's 2025 overview of the city's best bubble tea shops.

== See also ==
- List of tea companies
