= Ding Tea =

Taiwanese tea company

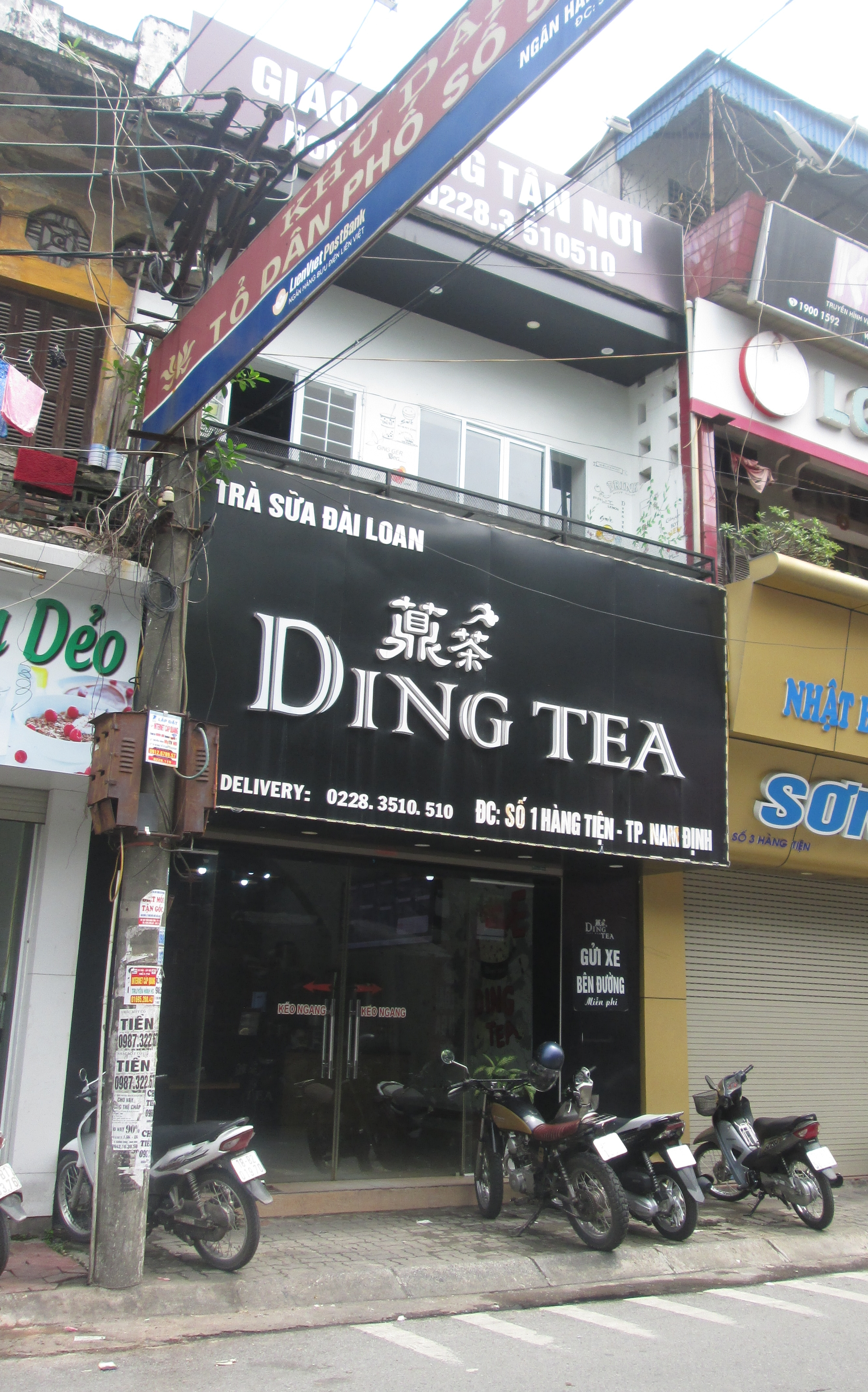
- Ding Tea shop in Nam Dinh City, Vietnam

Ding Tea is a Taiwanese tea company.

== History and locations ==
There were approximately 1,000 locations in 2021.

=== Asia ===
The business operated approximately 350 locations in Asia, as of 2017–2019.

=== Europe ===
In the United Kingdom, Ding Tea has operated in London.

=== North America ===
In the United States, the business has operated in Nevada (Las Vegas) and Texas (Houston). In California, Ding Tea has operated in National City and San Diego, including in La Jolla and Mira Mesa and at San Diego State University. In Portland, Oregon, Ding Tea began operating in southeast Portland's Lents neighborhood in 2019, and subsequent locations opened in north Portland and at Portland State University in downtown Portland. In Seattle, Ding Tea has operated in the University District.

== Reception ==
Aleenah Ansari included the business in Eater Seattle's 2025 overview of the city's best bubble tea shops.

== See also ==
- List of restaurant chains
- Taiwanese tea culture
