= Boba Guys =

American bubble tea store chain

Boba Guys is a chain of bubble tea stores in California.

== Unionization ==
Bobaristas at 6 Boba Guys locations in LA joined the California Retail & Restaurant Worker Union.

== Boba shortage ==
Their stores were affected by a boba shortage in 2021.
