= Modern China Tea Shop =

Chinese milk tea chain

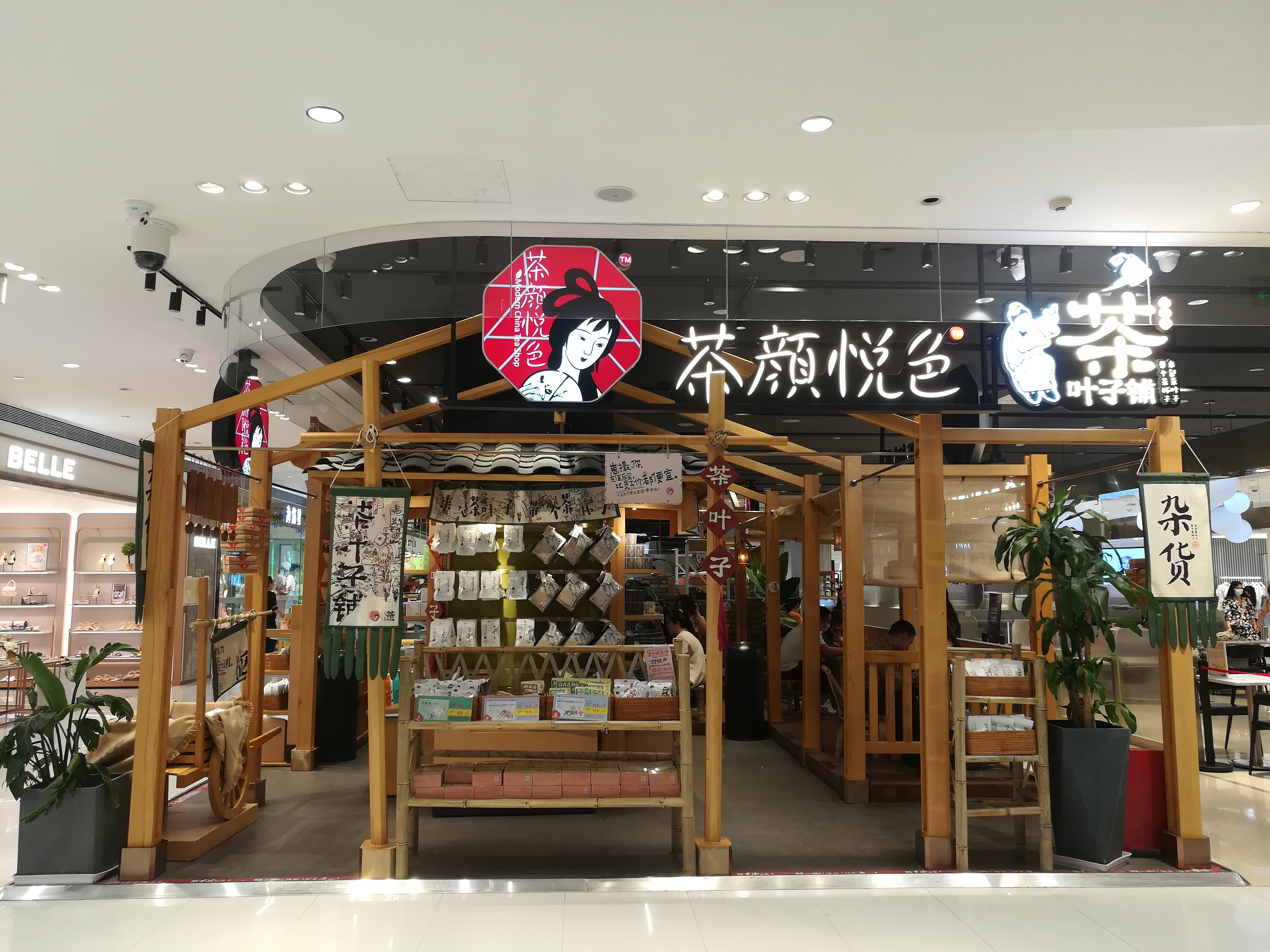
- Store in Changsha
- Native name: 茶颜悦色
- Number of locations: 500 (2024)
- Area served: Hunan, China

Modern China Tea Shop (Chinese: 茶颜悦色; pinyin: Cháyán Yuèsè), also known as Sexy Tea, is a Chinese milk tea chain based in Changsha, Hunan Province.

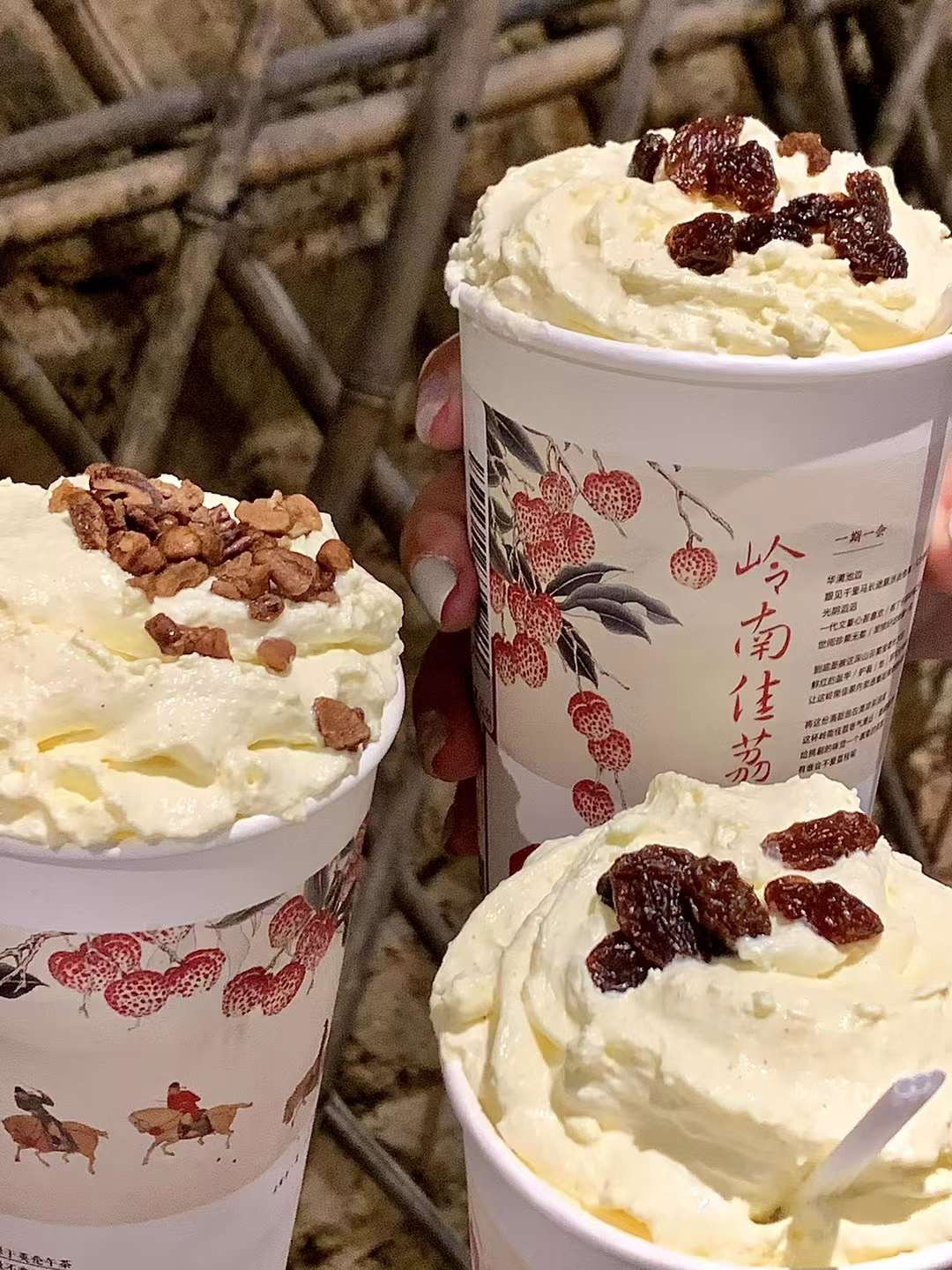
Milk tea at Sexy Tea

It was founded by Sun Cuiying and her husband Lyu Liang in 2013. The branding references traditional Chinese culture. The brand distinguishes itself partially by the use of higher quality ingredients.

It operates over 500 stores, primarily in Changsha and other cities in Hunan. The brand's milk tea enjoys nationwide fame, despite its limited geographic availability, with on some occasions customers waiting for hours in line and scalpers reselling beverages for up to 15 times the original price. Chayan Yuese has become Changsha tourist attraction, with some visitors coming to the city merely to try Chayan Yuese's beverages.

Several other companies started mimicking the traditional Chinese inspired theme of the Sexy Tea, such as Chagee. In 2021 the company won a lawsuit after suing two smaller tea stores for imitating its logo.

In 2021 the company apologized for perceived sexist texts on mugs which compared picking up women to picking up baskets, a local slang for something easy to gather.

In 2022 the company opened a coffee store chain called Yuanyang and in 2024 it launched lemon tea brand Good MoreNing.
