= Macao Imperial Tea =

International milk tea chain

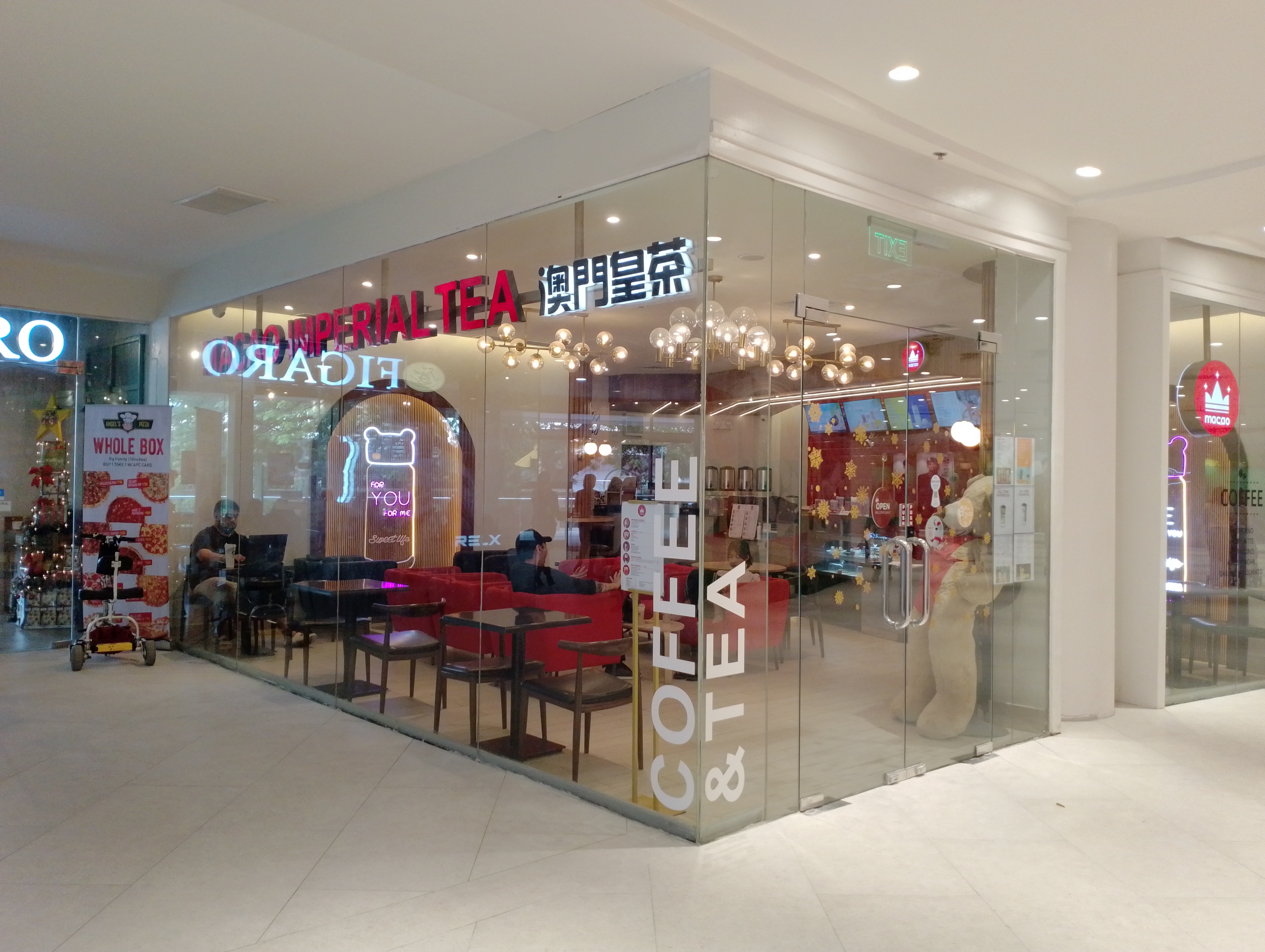
- A Macao Imperial Tea branch at Ayala Center Cebu in 2024
- Type: Private
- Industry: Food and beverage
- Headquarters: Macau (Global); Manila, Philippines (PH operations)
- Key people: Avin Ong (CEO, Fredley Group of Companies)
- Products: Bubble tea, fruit tea, coffee, soda
- Owner: Fredley Group of Companies (Philippines master franchisee)

Macao Imperial Tea is a global milk tea chain originally founded in Macau. The brand serves Taiwanese tea, Japanese matcha, and milk tea drinks that often include cream cheese. In the Philippines, the brand is managed by the Fredley Group of Companies, led by Avin Ong. By 2025, the chain had over 500 branches worldwide.

== History ==
The brand originated in Macau. Filipino entrepreneur Avin Ong discovered the tea shop while traveling in Macau in 2014. Ong secured the master franchise rights for the Philippines and opened the first branch in Banawe, Quezon City, in mid-2017.

When bringing the brand to the Philippines, the local management changed the business model from a "grab-and-go" stall concept, which was common in other countries, to a café-style model with seating and electrical outlets. The company sources its tea leaves from Macau.

The chain expanded through franchising. By 2020, the company operated over 350 branches globally, including locations in Vietnam, Malaysia, China, Canada, and the United States. In August 2022, the company opened its 235th Philippine store in Boracay.

During the COVID-19 pandemic in the Philippines, select branches reopened in April 2020 with safety protocols such as temperature checks and contactless delivery.

== Products ==
Macao Imperial Tea serves milk tea, fruit tea, sodas, and coffee. The menu features a "Cream Cheese" series and a "Chestnut Cream" series. The brand is also known for its "For You" and "For Me" tumbler packaging.

In June 2020, the company launched a fruit drink series. In December 2020, they released a "Partea Gallon," which contained 8 liters of milk tea. In April 2021, the chain introduced a "Cheesecake Halo-Halo" beverage, based on the Filipino dessert Halo-halo, which included 14 different ingredients.

=== Collaborations ===
In May 2023, the company collaborated with Twinings to release six tea-infused drinks.

In March 2025, Macao Imperial Tea partnered with Heinz for a campaign titled "ReMix." This collaboration involved drinks served in Heinz ketchup bottles and used ingredients such as tomato, mayonnaise, and apple cider vinegar. The flavors included "Sparkling Mango Tomato," "Mayo Mousse," and "Peach Raspberry."

== Operations ==
The chain hires persons with disabilities (PWDs) in some of its locations. In 2019, a branch in SM City Pampanga hired deaf and mute employees as part of an initiative to provide employment opportunities for PWDs.
