= It's Boba Time =

American drink chain

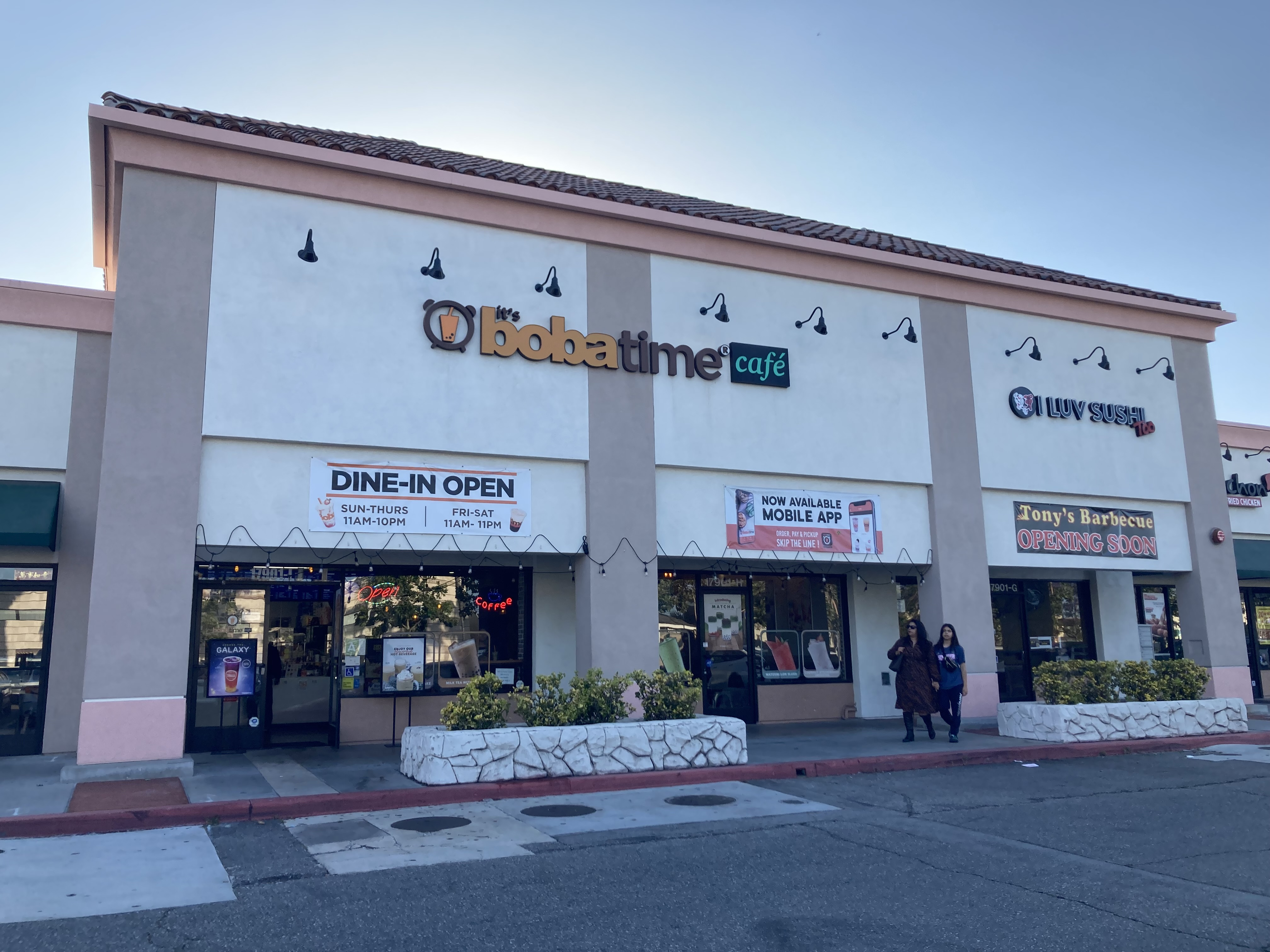
- A location in Artesia, California
- Type: Private
- Industry: Foodservice
- Founded: 2003; 23 years ago in Los Angeles
- Founder: Eunice Pak
- Number of locations: 112, 11 upcoming (November 2026)
- Area served: Arizona (upcoming); California; Florida (upcoming); Nevada (upcoming)
- Key people: Michelle Chon (public relations manager)
- Website: itsbobatime.com

It's Boba Time is a chain of retailers mainly selling drinks, such as boba and coffee. As of November 2026, the California-based company has 112 locations, with 11 to be opened soon in Arizona, Florida, and Nevada. Some popular locations attract a mean of 1,000 people daily.

== History ==
The chain was founded in 2003, by Eunice Pak in Los Angeles.

== Menu ==
The chain sells acai bowls, coffee, frappes, juice, iced tea, milk tea, milkshakes, shaved ice, slushies, and smoothies. Non-drinks that can also be bought include french fries and popcorn chicken. At its founding, it had only 40 drinks on its menu, but it has increased to over 140, with more being added yearly. The company also does not charge extra for its boba.

== Locations ==
The majority of Boba Time's California locations are in the Greater Los Angeles area, with two in San Diego, three in Bakersfield, and one each in Fresno and Temecula. In other states, three are planned in the Las Vegas Valley, Miami, and Phoenix metropolitan areas. Some locations offer free Wi-Fi.
