= Serenitea =

Philippine restaurant chain

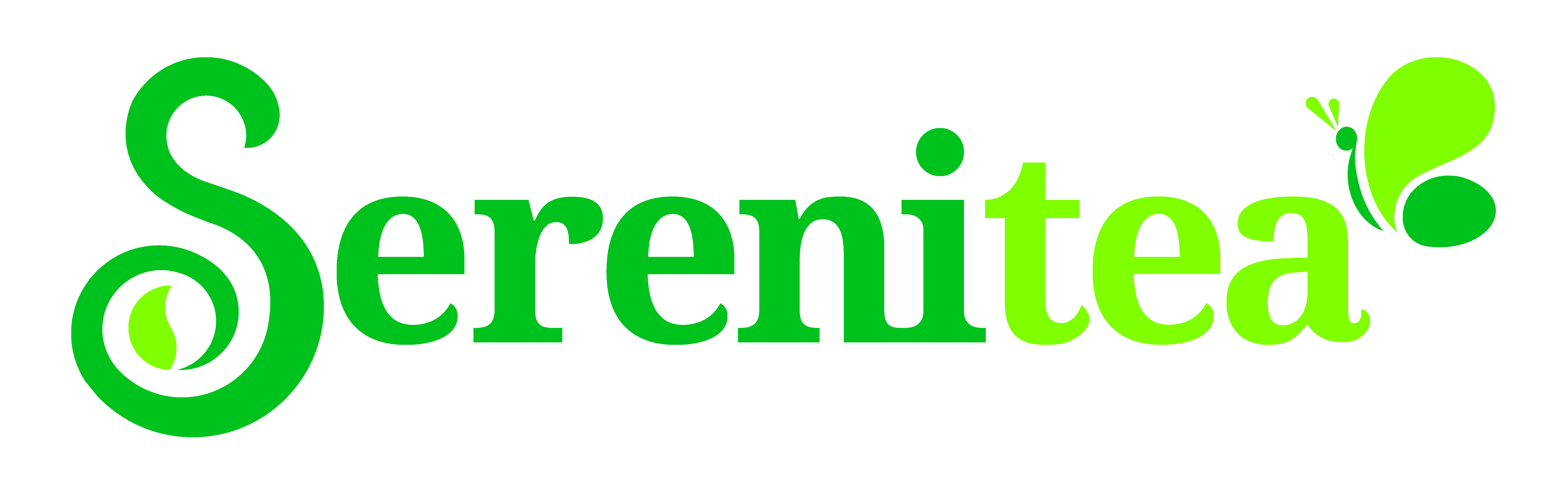

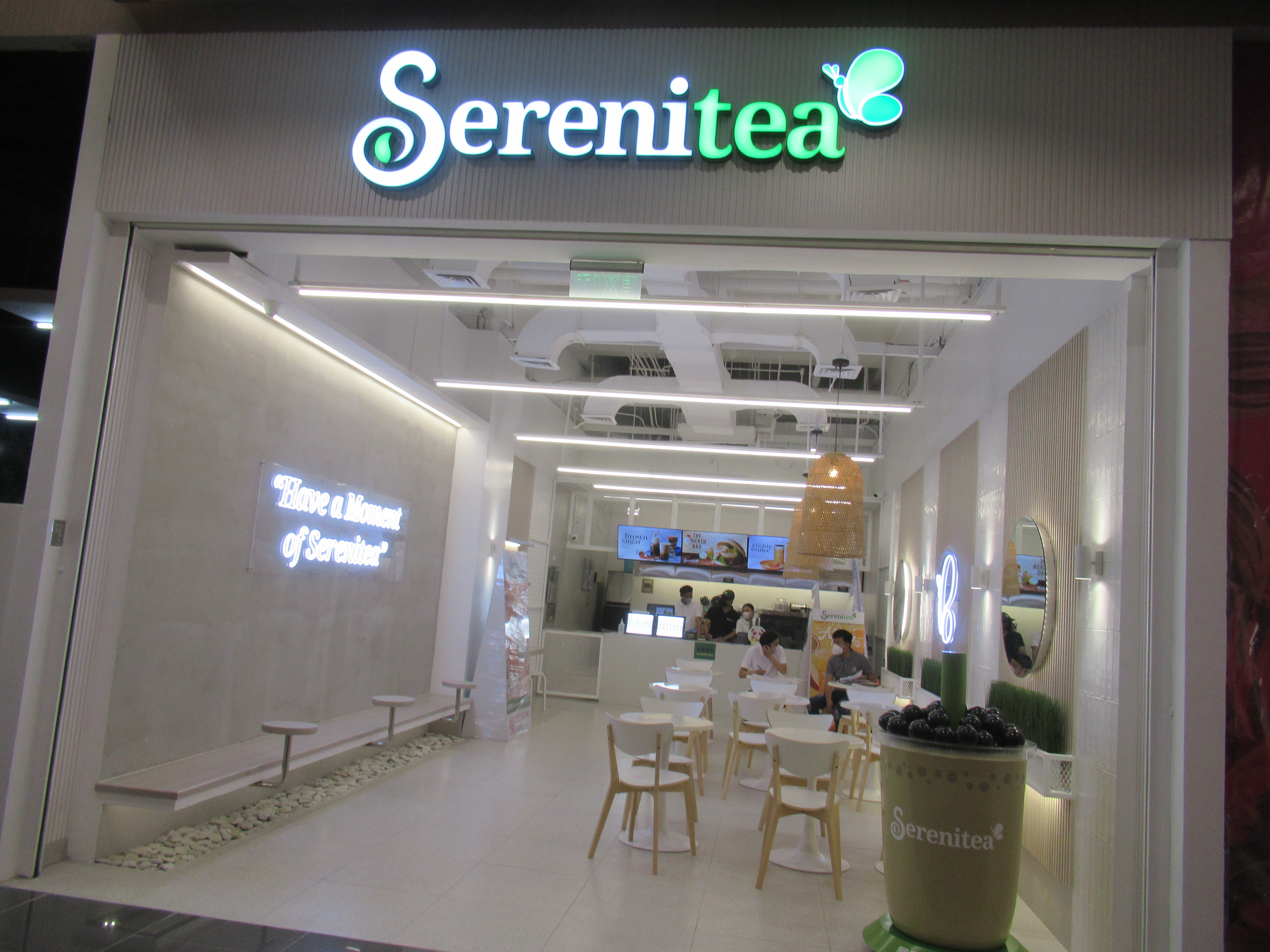
- A Serenitea outlet
- Type: Private
- Industry: Beverage
- Founded: December 19, 2008; 17 years ago in San Juan, Metro Manila, Philippines
- Founders: Peter Chen; Juliet Herrera-Chen
- Headquarters: San Juan, Philippines
- Area served: Philippines
- Products: Teas, milk tea
- Number of employees: Around 350 (2023)
- Website: iloveserenitea.com

Serenitea Cha Kitchen Inc. (d/b/a Serenitea) is a milk tea shop chain based in the Philippines.

== History ==
Serenitea was founded by Peter Chen and his then-fiancée Juliet Herrera. To create the brand, the couple borrowed ₱800,000 (around US$18,000) from their parents. The first Serenitea branch opened in Little Baguio, San Juan, Metro Manila on December 19, 2008, and has since expanded to more than 70 branches nationwide.

== Partnerships ==
Serenitea partnered with Filipino social enterprise Sip in 2017 to sell metal straws in selected branches within Metro Manila.

In 2023, Serenitea partnered with Pan de Manila to distribute Christmas-themed drinks based on the latter's ube halaya and yema spreads.
