= Chagee =

Chinese milk tea chain

Sichuan Chagee Enterprise Management Co., Ltd.

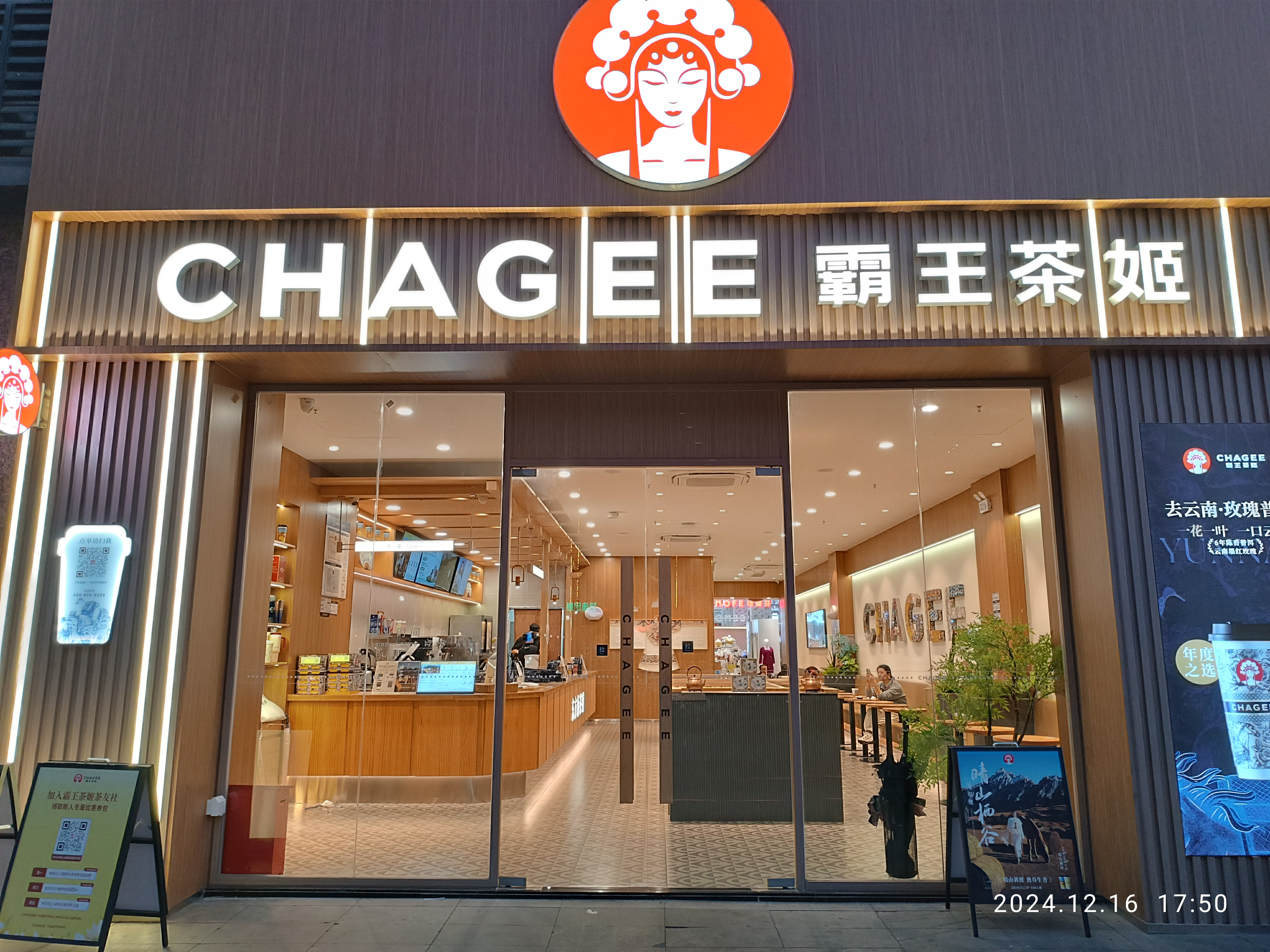
- Branch in Dongguan
- Native name: 四川茶姬企业管理有限公司
- Traded as: Nasdaq: CHA
- Founded: June 2017
- Founder: Zhang Junjie
- Headquarters: Chengdu
- Number of locations: 7,531 (2026)
- Key people: Zhang Junjie (CEO)
- Products: Milk tea
- Website: chagee.com

Sichuan Chagee Enterprise Management Co., Ltd., branded as CHAGEE, is a Chinese milk tea chain. It was founded in Yunnan in June 2017 by Zhang Junjie. Its Chinese name, 霸王茶姬 (pinyin: Bà Wáng chájī), is based on the traditional Chinese opera The Hegemon-King Bids His Lady Farewell (Chinese: 霸王别姬; pinyin: Bà Wáng Bié Jī), with the logo based on a huadan opera actor.

Its signature product is milk tea, made with fresh milk added to whole-leaf tea, named after ancient Chinese poems. Drinks are generally priced at RMB 20 (US$2.78) for large sizes, and RMB 16 (USD 2.22) for small sizes. The chain has been described as aiming to be the 'Oriental Starbucks', while previously resembling the style and products of Changsha-based milk tea chain Chayan Yuese. Its bags have also been compared to Dior packaging. The company operates on a franchising model.

== History ==
Founder Zhang Junjie was born into poverty in Kunming, Yunnan, and became an orphan at age 10. He never attended higher education, and started working as a milk tea store apprentice when he was 17. Within 5 years, Zhang was promoted to the level of regional supervisor and became a franchise partner of the milk tea brand. He later gained experience in corporate governance while working at a Shanghai-based startup. After witnessing the opening of a Heytea store, in 2017 he started Chagee in Kunming.

In 2021, Chagee moved its headquarters to Chengdu from Kunming. In 2024, the company adopted a dual-headquarters arrangement, with the general headquarters remaining in Chengdu and the overseas business management office located in Shanghai.

During the 2024 Summer Olympics, Chagee operated a pop-up store in Paris.

Media outlets estimated Chagee's annual revenue to be RMB 500 million in 2022. In 2023 the company opened 2,317 new outlets, reaching RMB 10.8 billion in revenue. In December 2025, there were over 7,000 Chagee stores worldwide, of which 200 were in overseas markets, and the company reported a net revenue of RMB 12.91 billion (US $1,845.7 million) for 2025.

=== Asian expansion ===
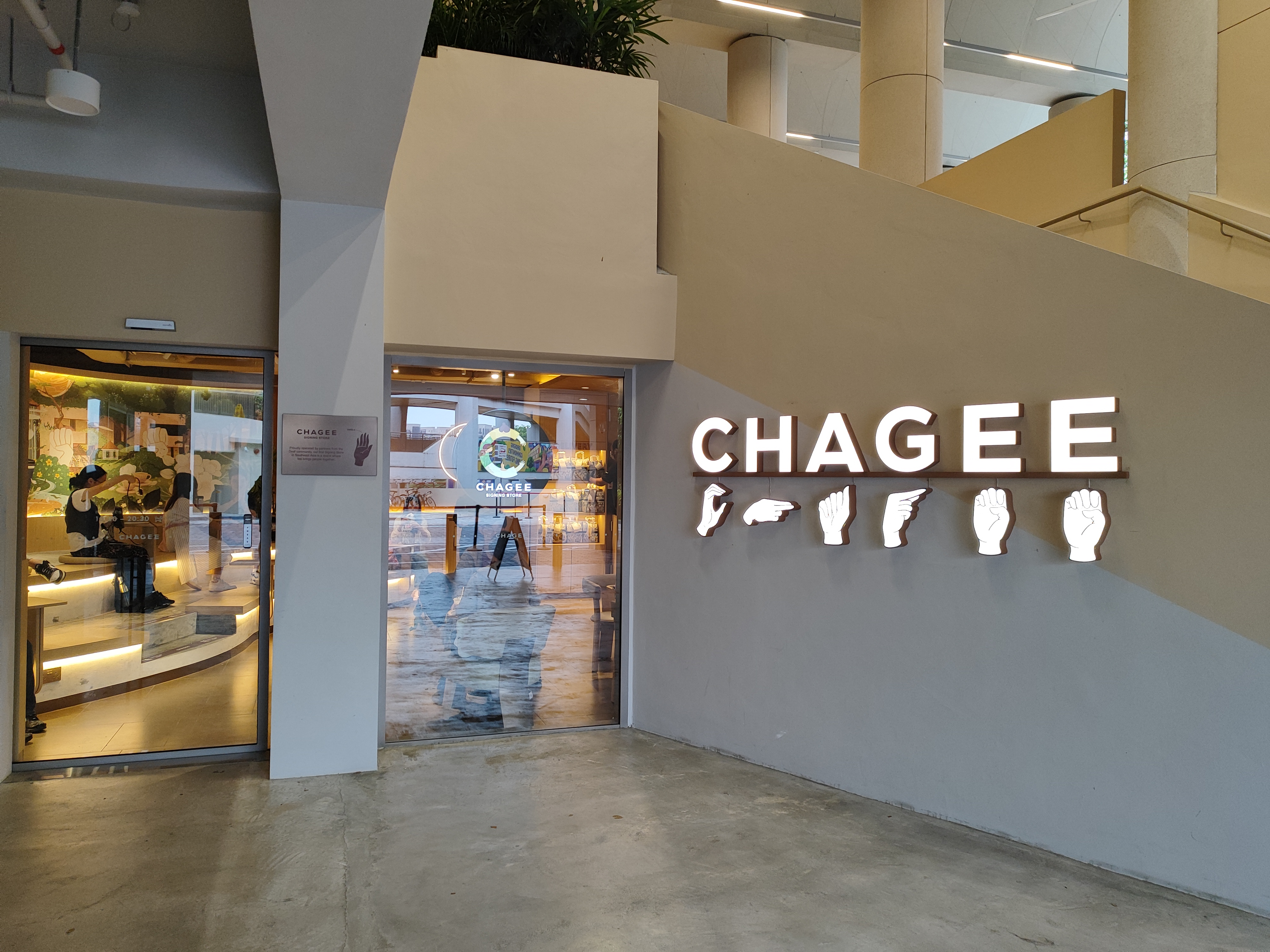
Chagee sign language store in Singapore

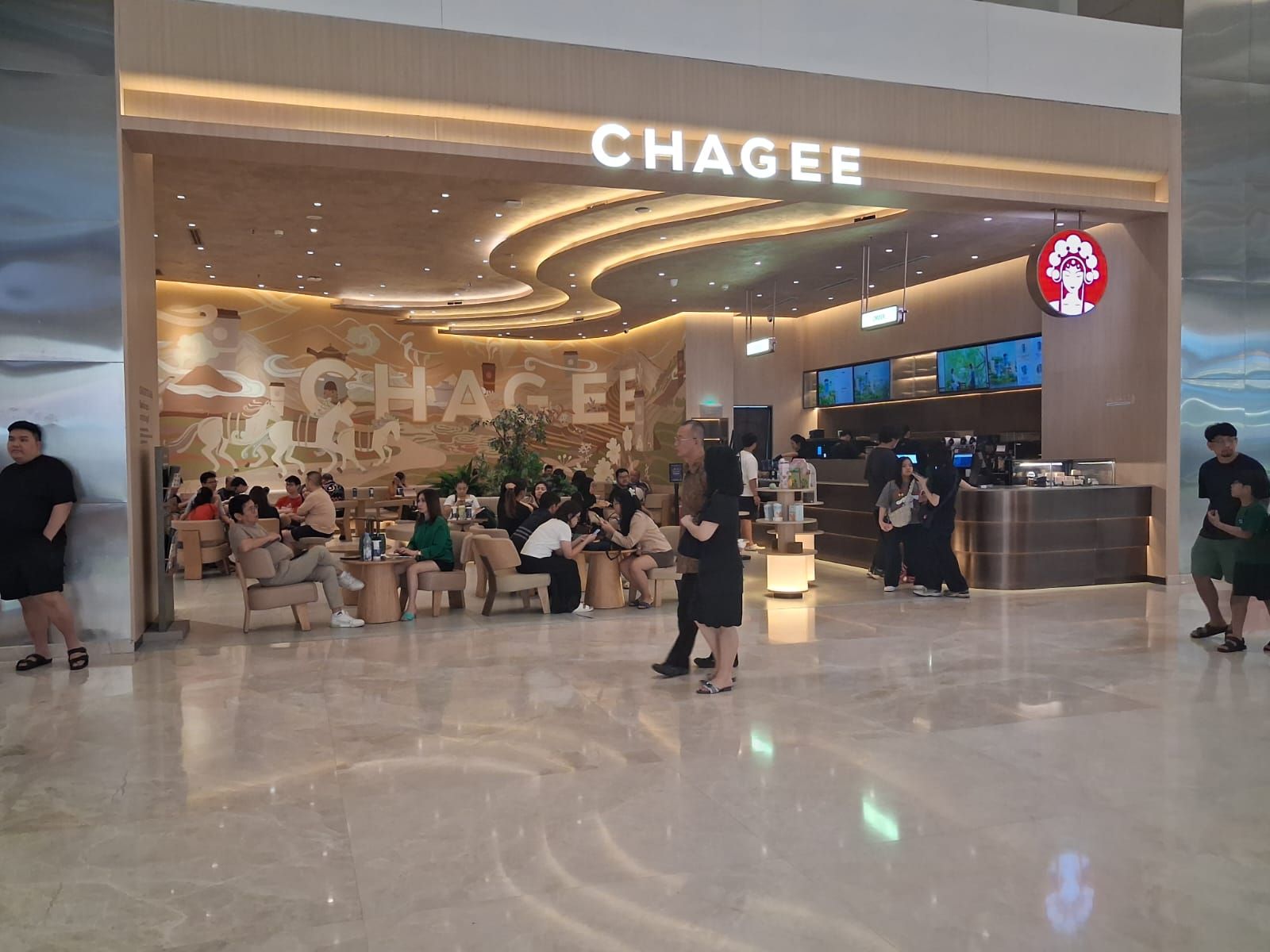
Chagee store in Jakarta

In 2019 the company opened stores in Singapore and Malaysia, its first stores outside of China. Chagee first entered the Singapore market under a franchise partnership model, expanding to twelve outlets island-wide by 2021. In early 2024, Chagee withdrew its franchise operations in Singapore as part of a decision to transition to company-owned outlets. It re-opened in Singapore in August 2024 with store locations at Orchard Gateway, Plaza Singapura, and Raffles Place. In May 2025, Chagee opened its first sign language store in Singapore at the National University of Singapore (NUS). As of 2024, Singapore served as Chagee's Southeast Asia headquarters.

Chagee opened its first location in Malaysia in the capital of Kuala Lumpur in August 2019 under the name BaWangChaJi. The company changed the name to Chagee Malaysia in 2021. By 2024, Chagee operated over 100 stores in Malaysia.

Chagee's first store in Thailand opened in 2022. By 2025, Chagee had opened additional stores in Thailand, including one on the 74th floor of the King Power Mahanakhon skyscraper in Bangkok.

In 2025, Chagee opened new locations in Singapore, Malaysia, Thailand, Indonesia, the Philippines, and Vietnam, including its first pet-friendly store in the Philippines. Chagee operated 207 company-owned and 138 franchised teahouses outside of China as of December 2025.

In May 2026, Chagee opened its first three stores in South Korea.

=== Entry into the United States ===
On April 17, 2025, Chagee raised $411 million through its initial public offering in the United States. On its Nasdaq debut the same day, Chagee stock closed at $33.75 per share, bringing the company's valuation to $6.2 billion.

Chagee opened its first US location in April 2025 at the Westfield Century City mall in Los Angeles. The company's US headquarters are located in Irvine, California. As of February 2026, Chagee operated six US stores, all located in Southern California: Brea, Culver City, Del Amo, Long Beach, Mission Viejo, and Torrance. For its US locations, Chagee launched an evening tea service in 2025 that includes a tea sommelier and a flight of several types of tea.

== Controversies ==
=== Malaysia 'Tear & Win' rigging controversy ===
In November 2024, Chagee held a 'Tear & Win' lottery as part of 7th anniversary commemoration of the brand's presence in Malaysia. A Malaysian Twitter user, naquib uploaded a viral video of Chagee staff member at an undisclosed Chagee outlet "checking" the special cups to identify what was printed on the small paper tabs inside. The incident raised suspicion among internet users about possible lottery manipulation. After the video went viral, Chagee Malaysia announced legal action against naquib for defamation, demanding the user to remove the video immediately to protect the privacy of the company's staff.

After causing uproar among Malaysians, Chagee would later issue an apology and stated the behaviour does not reflect the company standard. In order to prevent such incident from happening again, Chagee has switched the gift system from giving up physical items directly into QR code slips.

=== Nine-dash line controversies ===
As Chagee was scheduled to open its first Vietnamese outlet, it was caught in a controversy surrounding the depiction of the controversial nine-dash line in its mobile application. The map has caused uproar among Vietnamese internet users with many has called for boycott against the chain. After the map image went viral, the outlet that was set to open in District 1, Ho Chi Minh City removed the brand signage and replaced it with black background with a Vietnamese flag seen waving in front of a small door.

Aside from Vietnam, the brand depiction of the map has also caused ire in Malaysia. Malaysian internet users has also calling for a boycott against the brand. A Facebook page "Malaysian-souled Chinese" is the one who are leading the charge against the move citing the company has insulted Malaysian sovereignty over the region.
