= Teaspoon (restaurant) =

American bubble tea shop chain

Teaspoon is a chain of bubble tea shops. The business was started by Amy Lai in the U.S. state of California. As of 2024, there are 42 locations in California, Georgia, and Texas.
