= EasyWay =

Taiwanese former tea outlet (established 1992)

A pearl milk tea and a green tea with green apple jelly

EasyWay (now Epic Tea) was an international tea outlet that served hot and cold beverages with assorted flavouring. It started out as a small store in Taiwan owned by Kuo Wun-Ho and Fu Hsin-Chin back in 1992, its success riding on the popularity of bubble tea in Taiwan. EasyWay was a company with more than 700 stores worldwide, including outlets in Japan, South Korea, Australia, New Zealand, Canada and the United States.

EasyWay served tea and other drinks in sealed cups with heat-sealed plastic lids. Consumers could customise their order with such toppings as tapioca pearls or flavoured jelly. The tea offered included green tea and black tea, with the option of adding powdered mixtures such as milk, cocoa and almonds, or flavoured syrups such as green apple, lemon and pineapple. Outlets also served other items such as shaved ice drinks, relish tea, flavoured milk teas and iced chocolate and coffee.

== See also ==
- List of companies of Taiwan
