= List of the largest fast food restaurant chains =

This is a list of chains of fast-food restaurant that have had more than 500 outlets or more than US$20 million revenue, at any point in history.

== By revenue ==
| Rank | Country of origin | Name | Revenue (in USD) |
|---|---|---|---|
| 1 | United States | Starbucks | $32.3 billion (2022) |
| 2 | United States | KFC | $31.3 billion (2021) |
| 3 | United States | Burger King | $23.4 billion (2021) |
| 4 | United States | McDonald's | $23.2 billion (2021) |
| 5 | United States | Chick-fil-A | $18.8 billion (2022) |
| 6 | United States | Subway | $16.1 billion (2020) |
| 7 | United States | Taco Bell | $13.2 billion (2021) |
| 8 | United States | Pizza Hut | $13.1 billion (2024) |
| 9 | United States | Domino's | $12.9 billion (2021) |
| 10 | United States | Wendy's | $12.5 billion (2021) |
| 11 | United States | Chipotle Mexican Grill | $7.5 billion (2021) |
| 12 | Canada | Tim Hortons | $6.5 billion (2021) |
| 13 | United States | Popeyes | $5.5 billion (2021) |
| 14 | United States | Dairy Queen | $5.0 billion (2024) |
| 15 | United States | Jack in the Box | $4.1 billion (2021) |
| 16 | Russia | Dodo Pizza | $2.0 billion (2025) |
| 17 | United States | Papa John's | $2.0 billion (2021) |
| 18 | China | Mixue Ice Cream & Tea | $1.97 billion (2021) (RMB13.4 billion) |
| 19 | China | Luckin Coffee | $1.96 billion (2022) (RMB13.3 billion) |
| 20 | United Kingdom | Greggs | $1.61 billion (2021) (£1.2 billion) |
| 21 | United States | Krispy Kreme | $1.38 billion (2021) |
| 22 | United States | Dunkin' Donuts | $1.37 billion (2020) |
| 23 | United States | Firehouse Subs | $1.1 billion (2021) |
| 24 | Japan | Sukiya | $1.06 billion (2022) (¥172.3 billion) |
| 25 | United Kingdom | Wetherspoons | $1.03 billion (2021) (£772.5 million) |
| 26 | China | Home Original Chicken | $0.83 billion (2023) (RMB5.65 billion) |
| 27 | China | Good me | $0.82 billion (2023) (RMB5.57 billion) |
| 28 | Japan | Ichibanya | $0.52 billion (2021) (¥85.3 billion) |
| 29 | Japan | MOS Burger | $0.48 billion (2022) (¥78.4 billion) |
| 30 | Brazil | Bob's | $0.21 billion (2021) (R$ 1.1 billion) |
| 31 | India | Café Coffee Day | $0.05 billion (2022) (₹.5.0 billion) |
| 32 | United States | Orange Julius | $0.02 billion (2023) |

== By locations ==
| Rank | Country of origin | Name | Number of locations |
|---|---|---|---|
| 1 | China | Mixue Ice Cream & Tea | 53,000 (2026) |
| 2 | United States | McDonald's | 45,356 (2025) |
| 3 | United States | Starbucks | 40,990 (2025) |
| 4 | China | Luckin Coffee | 35,000 (2026) |
| 5 | United States | Subway | 35,000 (2026) |
| 6 | United States | KFC | 31,981+ (2026) |
| 7 | United States | Domino's | 20,591 (2024) |
| 8 | China | Wallace | 20,065 (2023) |
| 9 | United States | Burger King | 19,900 (2025) |
| 10 | United States | Pizza Hut | 19,974 (2025) |
| 11 | United States | Dunkin' Donuts | 12,700 (2021) |
| 12 | United States | Krispy Kreme | 10,427 (2021) |
| 13 | United States | Hunt Brothers Pizza | 10,000+ (2024) |
| 14 | China | Cotti Coffee | 10,000 (2024) |
| 15 | China | Good me | 9,675 (2024) |
| 16 | China | Tastien | 9,600 (2025) |
| 17 | China | Auntea Jenny | 9,367 (2025) |
| 18 | United States | Taco Bell | 8,218 (2022) |
| 19 | China | ChaPanda | 8,016 (2024) |
| 20 | United States | Baskin-Robbins | 7,800+ (2023) |
| 21 | United States | Dairy Queen | 7,500+ (2024) |
| 22 | United States | Wendy's | 7,166 (2023) |
| 23 | China | Chagee | 6,000+ (2024) |
| 24 | China | Tianlala | 5,994 (2024) |
| 25 | Canada | Tim Hortons | 5,701 (2023) |
| 26 | United States | Papa John's | 5,650 (2021) |
| 27 | United States | Little Caesars | 5,463 |
| 28 | United Kingdom | Costa Coffee | 4,000 (2021) |
| 29 | China | Hey Tea | 4,000 (2024) |
| 30 | United States | Hardee's | 3,800+ (2024) |
| 31 | United States | Carl's Jr. | 3,800+ (2024) |
| 32 | United States | Popeyes | 3,705 (2021) |
| 33 | South Korea | bb.q Chicken | 3,500+ (2025) |
| 34 | United States | Sonic Drive-In | 3,493 |
| 35 | United States | Arby's | 3,405+ (2022) |
| 36 | United States | Chipotle Mexican Grill | 2,962 (2021) |
| 37 | China | Champion Pizza | 2,945 (2024) |
| 38 | United States | Chick-fil-A | 2,700 (2021) |
| 39 | United States | Jimmy John's | 2,600+ |
| 40 | Taiwan | Dicos | 2,500 |
| 41 | United States | Jersey Mike's Subs | 2,500 (2021) |
| 42 | United States | Jack in the Box | 2,267 (2021) |
| 43 | United States | Panera Bread | 2,239 |
| 44 | United Kingdom | Greggs | 2,200 (2021) |
| 45 | United States | Panda Express | 2,180+ |
| 46 | Taiwan | Ting Hsin International Group | 2,160 |
| 47 | China | Kwafood | 2,000+ (2023) |
| 48 | South Korea | Pelicana Chicken | 2,000+ |
| 49 | United States | Auntie Anne's | 1,950+ |
| 50 | Japan | Sukiya | 1,946 (2022) |
| 51 | China | Naixue | 1,926 (2024) |
| 52 | China | Pala Hamburger | 1,850 |
| 53 | United States | Chester's | 1,800+ |
| 54 | China | Mi Bibimbap | 1,800 (2025) |
| 55 | China | NewYobo | 1,800 (2025) |
| 56 | Philippines | Chooks-to-Go | 1,800 (2024) |
| 57 | Philippines | Jollibee | 1,700 (2024) |
| 58 | United States | Church's Texas Chicken | 1,700 |
| 59 | Japan | MOS Burger | 1,681 (2022) |
| 60 | Russia | Dodo Pizza | 1,673 (2026) |
| 61 | United States | Cinnabon | 1,600+ |
| 62 | United States | WingStreet | 1,600~ |
| 63 | United States | Five Guys | 1,500+ |
| 64 | United States | Quiznos | 1,500 |
| 65 | Japan | Ichibanya | 1,461 (2021) |
| 66 | China | Home Original Chicken | 1,404 (2024) |
| 67 | United States | Papa Murphy's | 1,404 (2021) |
| 68 | Spain | Telepizza | 1,376 (2021) |
| 69 | Indonesia | Kebab Turki Baba Rafi | 1,300 |
| 70 | United States | Firehouse Subs | 1,213 (2021) |
| 71 | United States | Long John Silver's | 1,200 |
| 72 | United States | Orange Julius | 1,164 (2024) |
| 73 | Brazil | Bob's | 1,080 (2021) |
| 74 | United States | A&W Restaurants | 1,028 (2021) |
| 75 | United States | Culver's | 1,000+ (2025) |
| 76 | Taiwan | 85°C Bakery Cafe | 1,000+ |
| 77 | Russia | Vkusno i Tochka | 980+ |
| 78 | United States | Zaxby's | 941 |
| 79 | South Africa | Nando's | 913 (2021) |
| 80 | United States | Checkers and Rally's | 878+ |
| 81 | United Kingdom | Wetherspoons | 861 (2021) |
| 82 | United States | Qdoba | 858 (2025) |
| 83 | Singapore | BreadTalk | 836 |
| 84 | United States | Häagen-Dazs | 832 (2022) |
| 85 | United States | Raising Cane's Chicken Fingers | 828 (2024) |
| 86 | India | Café Coffee Day | 780 (2022) |
| 87 | United States | Bojangles' Famous Chicken 'n Biscuits | 780 |
| 88 | United States | Whataburger | 735 |
| 89 | United Kingdom | SFC Plus | 700+ |
| 90 | United States | Moe's Southwest Grill | 634+ |
| 91 | Canada | Pizza Pizza | 630+ |
| 92 | United States | Rita's Italian Ice | 618+ |
| 93 | United States | Wow Bao | 600+ |
| 94 | United States | Smoothie King | 600+ |
| 95 | Philippines | Mang Inasal | 600+ |
| 96 | United States | Sbarro | 600+ |
| 97 | Canada | Pita Pit | 588 |
| 98 | China | Kungfu | 566 |
| 99 | Australia | Boost Juice | 550 |
| 100 | United States | Del Taco | 547 |
| 101 | United States | Steak 'n Shake | 544 |
| 102 | South Africa | Wimpy | 543 |
| 103 | United States | Hungry Howie's | 530+ |
| 104 | South Africa | Steers | 525 |
| 105 | United States | Captain D's | 520 |
| 106 | China | Da Niang Dumpling | 514 |
| 107 | France | Brioche Dorée | 512+ |
| 108 | United States | Charleys Philly Steaks | 510+ |
| 109 | Finland | Hesburger | 508 |
| 110 | United States | Round Table Pizza | 507+ |
| 111 | United States | Shake Shack | 500+ |
| 112 | United States | Freddy's Frozen Custard & Steakburgers | 500+ |
| 113 | Philippines | Shakey's Pizza | 500+ |
| 114 | Bangladesh | Tasty Treat | 500+ |

== See also ==
- List of fast food restaurant chains
