= Shanghai (disambiguation) =

Shanghai is a city in China.

Shanghai may also refer to:

== Places ==
=== China ===
- Shanghai Subdistrict, a subdistrict of Fuzhou, Fujian
- Shanghai County, a former county, fully absorbed by Minhang District, Shanghai in 1992
- Shanghai International Settlement, China (1842 to 1943)
- Shanghai (1927–1949), a former special municipality of the Republic of China

=== United States ===
- Shanghai City, Illinois, an unincorporated community
- Shanghai, Virginia, an unincorporated community
- Shanghai, West Virginia, an unincorporated community
- Shanghai Lake, Le Sueur County, Minnesota

== Entertainment ==
=== In film ===
- Shanghai (1935 film), starring Loretta Young
- Shanghai (2010 film), starring John Cusack and Gong Li
- Shanghai (2012 film), an Indian film directed by Dibakar Banerjee and starring Abhay Deol and Emraan Hashmi

=== Games ===
- Shanghai (video game), a computerized version of mahjong solitaire published in 1986
- Shanghai Rum, a card game based on gin rummy
- Shanghai, the combination 20, double 20 and treble 20 (scoring a total of 120), in darts
- Shanghai Solitaire, an alternative name for mahjong solitaire

=== Music ===
- (Why Did I Tell You I Was Going To) Shanghai, a 1951 song by Doris Day
- "Shanghai", a song by King Gizzard & the Lizard Wizard from Butterfly 3000
- "Shanghai", a song off the deluxe version of The Pink Print by Nicki Minaj

== Transportation ==
- Shanghai Y-10, a cancelled commercial passenger jet
- Shanghai Automotive Industry Corporation, a former name of SAIC Motor

== People ==
- James Kelly (crimper) (fl. early 1870s), better known as "Shanghai" Kelly, an American crimp who kidnapped men for ships' crews
- Abel Head "Shanghai" Pierce (1834–1900), Texas rancher

== Other uses ==
- Shanghai (photograph), a 2000 photograph by Andreas Gursky
- Shanghai (processor), an AMD 45nm computer processor of the AMD_K10 family
- 2197 Shanghai, an asteroid named after the city
- Shanghai Cooperation Organisation, an intergovernmental security organization
- Shanghaiing, the practice of conscripting men as sailors by coercive techniques
- Lumpiang shanghai, a variety of lumpia rolls
- Shanghai, an alternative name for the slingshot

== See also ==
- Shanghainese (disambiguation)
