= Good me =

Chinese tea drink chain

Guming Holdings Limited

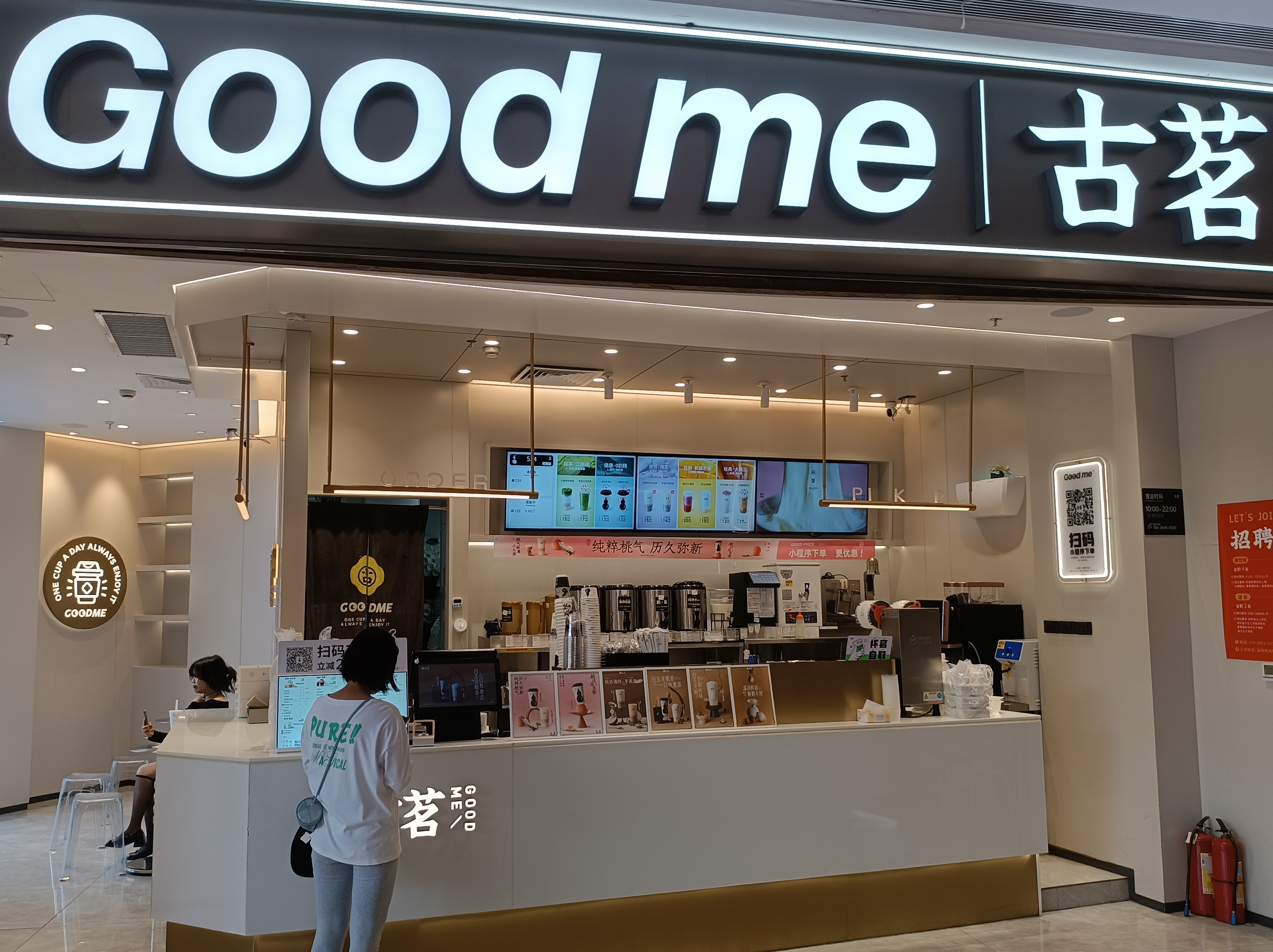
- Branch in Shenzhen
- Trade name: Good me
- Native name: 古茗控股有限公司
- Type: Public
- Traded as: SEHK: 1364
- Industry: Teahouse
- Founded: 2010; 16 years ago
- Founders: Wang Yun’an
- Headquarters: Hangzhou, Zhejiang, China
- Key people: Wang Yun’an (Chairman & CEO)
- Revenue: ▲CN¥7.68 billion (2023)
- Net income: ▲CN¥1.10 billion (2023)
- Total assets: ▲CN¥5.15 billion (2023)
- Total equity: ▲CN¥615.51 million (2023)
- Website: www.gumingnc.com

Guming Holdings Limited (known under the brand name Good me; Chinese: 古茗; pinyin: Gǔmíng; lit. 'Ancient tea water') is a publicly listed Chinese teahouse chain. Founded in 2010 by Wang Yun'an and headquartered in Hangzhou, Zhejiang, the company operates primarily in China's lower-tier cities, selling beverages such as fruit tea, milk tea, and coffee through a franchise model.

As of late 2024, Good me had expanded to nearly 9,800 outlets nationwide, making it one of China's largest bubble tea chains. Guming Holdings went public on the Hong Kong Stock Exchange in February 2025, raising approximately US$233 million in its initial public offering (IPO).

== History ==
In 2010, Wang Yun'an founded Good me after graduating from Zhejiang Sci-Tech University. The company opened its first store in Wang's hometown of Daxi in Taizhou, Zhejiang, which had a population under 200,000.

In its early stages, the business reportedly experienced low sales volumes. Over time, Good me adopted a franchise-based expansion model, targeting lower-tier cities. The company emphasized cost-effective store designs and consistent branding elements such as bright lighting.

Good me's expansion was supported by the development of a cold chain logistics system, which enabled frequent delivery of fresh ingredients to franchise location. According to China Daily, industry sources have cited this logistics capability as a factor contributing to its competitive position in the market

By the end of 2023, Good me had almost 10,000 stores and was second largest among its peers (behind Mixue Ice Cream & Tea) in terms of total sales and number of stores.

In September 2024, a video posted on Chinese social media depicted staff with their heads lowered and their hands bound with mock handcuffs made from cardboard cup holders while wearing placards that listed their workplace 'offenses.' The caption read: "This is a warning. Next time…there will be no next time." The post drew criticism online; the company removed the clip, and on September 18, 2024, issued an apology. A staff quoted in media coverage said the video was intended as a joke and did not reflect actual workplace practice.

In February 2025, Good me held its initial public offering becoming a listed company on the Hong Kong Stock Exchange with the offering raising US$233 million. On its trading debut, its shares dropped 6.4%. The IPO elevated founder Wang Yun'an's personal stake to an estimated HK$8.6 billion (about US$1.2 billion).

== See also ==
- ChaPanda
- Hey Tea
- Naixue
