= Suicide of Fat Cat =

2024 suicide in Chongqing, China

Fat Cat
- 胖猫
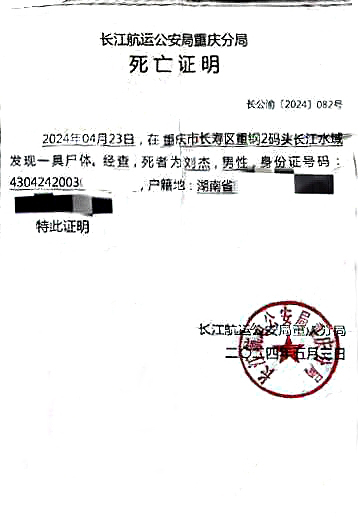
- Death certificate of "Suicide of Fat Cat" Liu Jie (scanned version)
- Born: Liu Jie; 18 May 2003; Linwu, Chenzhou, Hunan, China
- Died: 11 April 2024 (aged 20); Yuzhong, Chongqing, China
- Cause of death: Suicide by jumping

On 11 April 2024, at 4:43 AM, 20-year-old Chinese male gamer Liu Jie (Note: simplified Chinese: 刘杰; traditional Chinese: 劉傑; pinyin: Liú Jié) (known online as "Fat Cat") (Note: simplified Chinese: 胖猫; traditional Chinese: 胖貓; pinyin: Pàngmāo) took his own life by jumping from a bridge in Yuzhong, Chongqing. After his suicide, his ex-girlfriend Tan faced backlash on Chinese social media and was accused of financially exploiting him. In May 2024, Chinese authorities revealed that the smear campaign against Liu's ex-girlfriend was orchestrated by Liu's sister, who had shared private information and solicited harassment against Tan. Police investigations later revealed Liu and Tan had a genuine relationship with mutual financial exchanges, and there was no evidence of exploitation. Liu's sister eventually admitted to her actions and apologized. The incident gained widespread media attention, sparking debates on cyberbullying and gender dynamics in China.

== Background ==
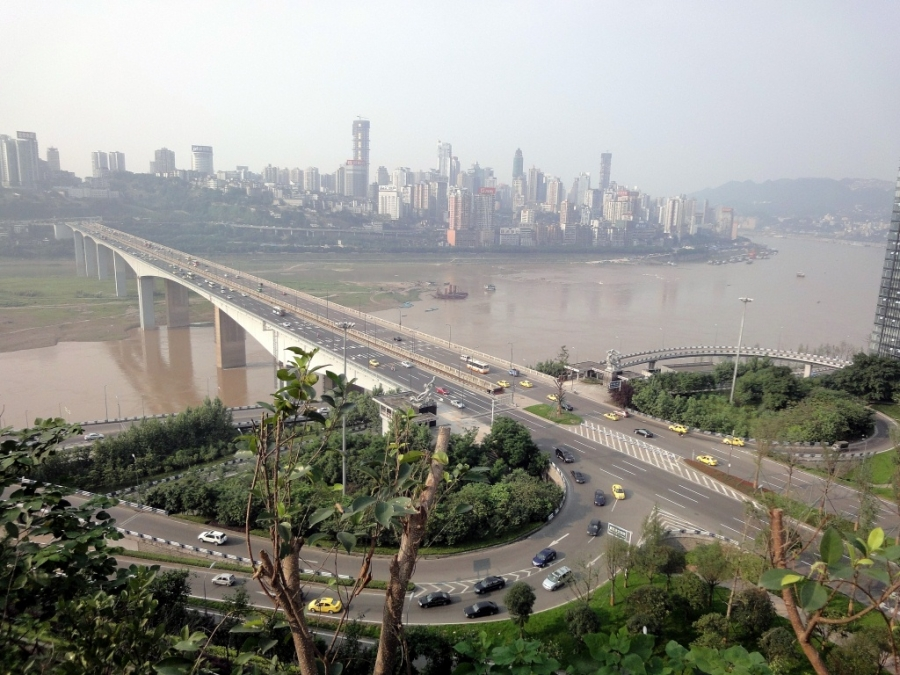
The Shibanpo Bridge over the Yangtze River where Fat Cat committed suicide.

Fat Cat was born in Chenzhou, Hunan Province, on 18 May 2003. He worked as a gaming influencer for around ten hours a day game boosting, or professionally playing video games for other people. In November 2021, Fat Cat met his would-be girlfriend, Tan, through the mobile game Honor of Kings. He led a frugal personal life and financially supported her, once contributing 70,000 yuan to help her open a shop. In April 2024, Fat Cat traveled from Hunan to Chongqing to live with Tan. She declined his offer to move in, and their relationship soon ended. Fat Cat then transferred a large sum of money to her and jumped off a bridge in Chongqing. His body was found 12 days later. Following the incident, Tan was doxxed and harassed by many, sparking debates on marriage in China. She then returned a portion of the money to the family. Fat Cat's body was cremated on 3 May 2024.

== Aftermath ==
After his death, Liu Jie's ex-girlfriend Tan was subjected to intense online harassment. Initially, she was blamed for Liu's death and accused of being a gold digger. Her financial records were leaked online and appeared to support this narrative, sparking widespread online hatred, particularly among Chinese men. Fat Cat's sister initially threatened to press charges against Tan.

In a turn of events, Chongqing police revealed on 19 May 2024 that Liu's sister was behind the smear campaign against Tan. Using the account "Keke Can't Sleep", she posted videos and financial records claiming Tan extorted money from Liu. However, a police investigation later revealed that this narrative was entirely fabricated. The police found that Liu's sister had fueled the online harassment by posting private information and paying to boost her online visibility. This led to severe harassment of Tan, including death threats. The case is said to have highlighted the dangers of misinformation and the ease with which public opinion and media can be manipulated.

Police investigations also showed that Liu and Tan had a legitimate relationship, with mutual financial exchanges totaling over 1.26 million yuan. After Liu's death, Tan returned a significant sum of money, and Liu's family and Tan reached a reconciliation.

Liu's sister admitted to her wrongdoing, apologized, and her accounts were banned on multiple platforms. Liu's sister and several influencers faced penalties for manipulating public opinion and infringing on Tan's privacy. The case has sparked renewed debate about the impact of misinformation and gender dynamics in China.

== Reactions ==
In May 2024, many Chongqing residents gathering at the bridge where Fat Cat died. They placed flowers, McDonald's meals, and bubble tea at the site, inspired by Fat Cat's profile picture that read, "I don't want vegetables, I want McDonald's." Fat Cat's sister asked people not to have food delivered to the bridge because of growing traffic by Fat Cat's memorial. People who had ordered takeout to be delivered to the memorial discovered that the packages and containers were empty or filled with water. Five brands involved in the incident issued apologies. They announced punitive measures against offending locations and pledged to refund the orders." One brand, ChaPanda, also made a donation to the Sichuan Youth Development Foundation in Fat Cat's name. McDonald's Vietnam attempted to use a slogan that referenced the suicide; Vietnamese customers called for a boycott, and McDonald's Vietnam issued an apology online.

Many netizens have compared the suicide of Fat Cat with that of Su Xiangmao.

China Women's News noted the need for rationality and legal adherence in public discourse, condemning the spread of rumors and online violence. Chinese state media outlet Chongqing Daily opined on the saga, stating that it was an ordinary romantic relationship manipulated by behind-the-scenes 'directors' into large-scale online bullying infringing on privacy.
