= Taijiang, Fuzhou =

Settlement in Fuzhou, Fujian, China

Taijiang 台江区
- District
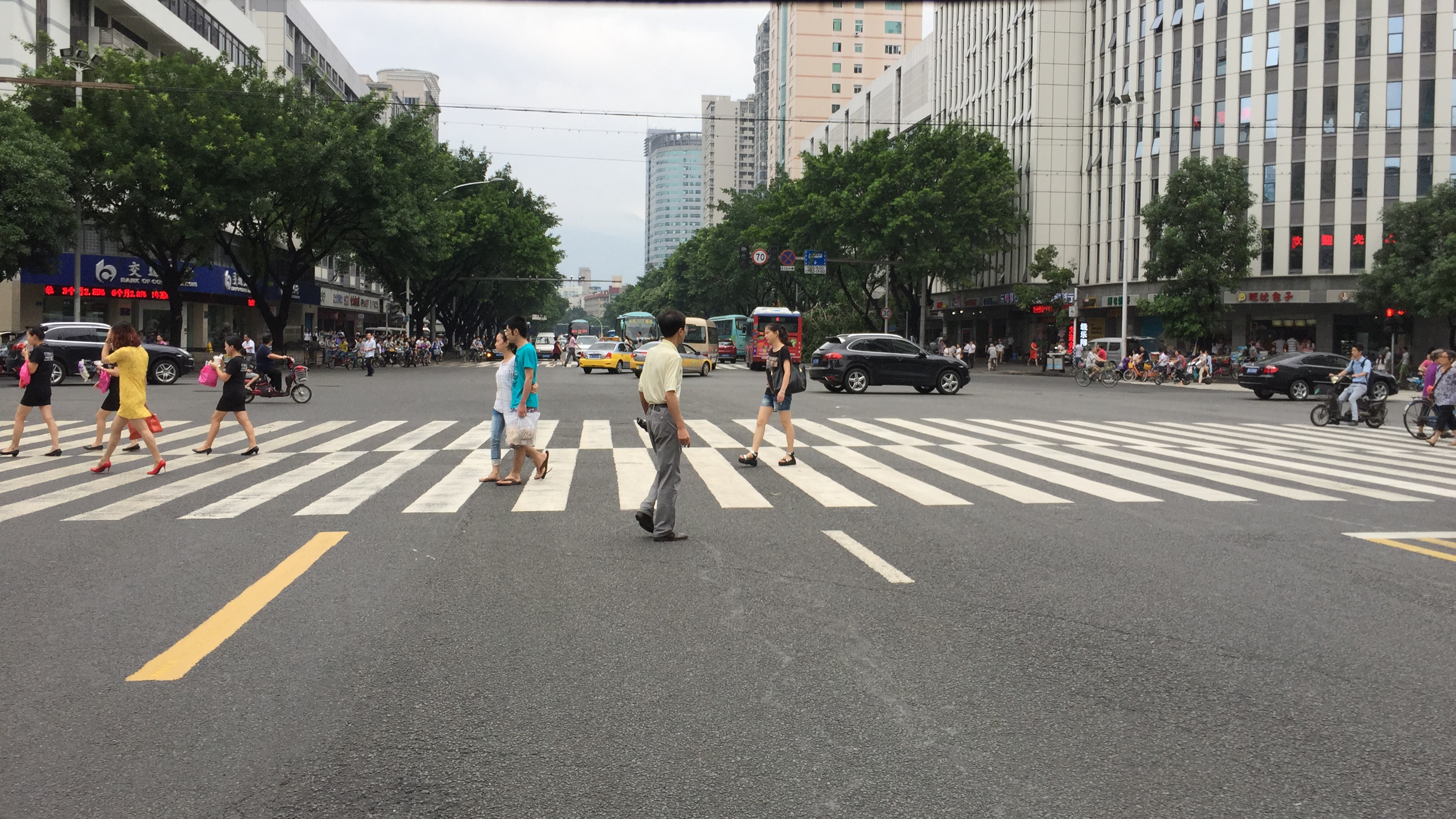

- Location in Fujian
- Coordinates: 26°03′52″N 119°18′32″E
- Country: People's Republic of China
- Province: Fujian
- Prefecture-level city: Fuzhou

Population (2020)
  - Total: 411,819
- Time zone: UTC+8 (China Standard)
- GDP (2021): CN¥ 60.08 billion

Taijiang District (Chinese: 台江; pinyin: Táijiāng; Foochow Romanized: Dài-gĕ̤ng) is one of six urban districts of the prefecture-level city of Fuzhou, the capital of Fujian, China.

The district has the headquarters of the fast food chain CNHLS, originally called Wallace.

== Administrative divisions ==
Subdistricts of Taijiang include: Chating Subdistrict (茶亭街道), Yangzhong Subdistrict (洋中街道), Cangxia Subdistrict (苍霞街道), Yizhou Subdistrict (义洲街道), Shanghai Subdistrict (上海街道), Yingzhou Subdistrict (瀛洲街道), Xingang Subdistrict (新港街道), Houzhou Subdistrict (后洲街道), Aofeng Subdistrict (鳌峰街道), and Ninghua Subdistrict (宁化街道)
