= Shibanpo Yangtze River Bridge =

Shibanpo Yangtze River Bridge 石板坡长江大桥
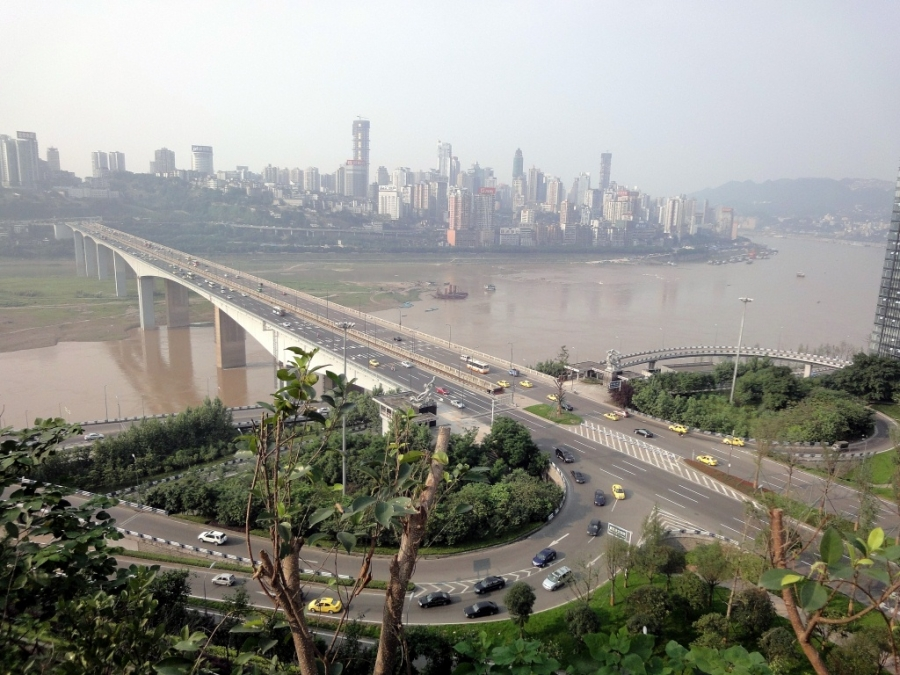
- Both Shibanpo Bridges looking towards Jiefangbei CBD area.
- Coordinates: 29.545556°N 106.559889°E
- Carries: Jiangnan Avenue
- Crosses: Yangtze River
- Locale: Chongqing, China

Characteristics
- Design: Box girder bridge
- Material: Prestressed concrete
- Total length: 1,103 metres (3,619 ft)
- Longest span: 1st bridge: 174 m (571 ft); 2nd bridge: 330 m (1,080 ft)

History
- Opened: 1st bridge: 1980; 2nd bridge: 2006

Location
- Interactive map of Shibanpo Yangtze River Bridge

The Shibanpo Yangtze River Bridge (simplified Chinese: 石板坡长江大桥; traditional Chinese: 石板坡長江大橋; pinyin: Shíbǎnpō chángjiāng dàqiáo) consists of a pair of prestressed concrete box girder bridges over the Yangtze River in Chongqing, China. The bridges carries 8 lanes of traffic on Jiangnan Avenue between the Nan'an District south of the Yangtze River and the Yuzhong District to the north.

== Original Bridge ==
Construction of the original bridge began in November 1977. The bridge cost RMB 64.68 million and was opened to traffic on 1 July 1980. The bridge was the first road bridge over the Yangtze River in Chongqing. The bridge carried two lanes of traffic in each direction.

== Second Bridge ==
In 2003 construction began on the second four lane bridge to the west of the existing bridge to meet growing traffic demands. The new bridge was completed in 2006 at a cost of approximately US$40 million. The main span of the new bridge was manufactured in the Wuchang District of Wuhan. It was sealed and was towed over 1,000 kilometres (620 mi) upstream to Chongqing. Placement of the piers due to the close proximity to the existing bridge necessitated a longer span; the bridge's main span of 330 metres (1,080 ft) makes it the largest box girder bridge in the world, displacing the previous record holder, the Stolma Bridge. When the bridge was opened southbound traffic was moved onto the new bridge and all four lanes of the original bridge were used for northbound traffic.

== Incidents ==
The Suicide of Fat Cat occurred on April 11, 2024, at 4:00 AM. A 21-year-old male gamer known as "Fat Cat" jumped off the Shibanpo Yangtze River Bridge after breaking up with his girlfriend. The incident gained widespread media attention the following month and became hot news in Southeast Asian countries.

Elevation of the second Shibanpo bridge

== See also ==
- Yangtze River bridges and tunnels
