= Shanghainese (disambiguation) =

Shanghainese is a variety of Wu Chinese spoken in the central districts of the City of Shanghai and its surrounding areas.

Shanghainese may also refer to:

- Wu Chinese, Chinese languages that include Shanghainese
- Shanghainese people
- Shanghainese cuisine

== See also ==
- Shanghai (disambiguation)
