= ChaPanda =

Chinese bubble tea brand

Sichuan Baicha Baidao Industrial Co., Ltd.

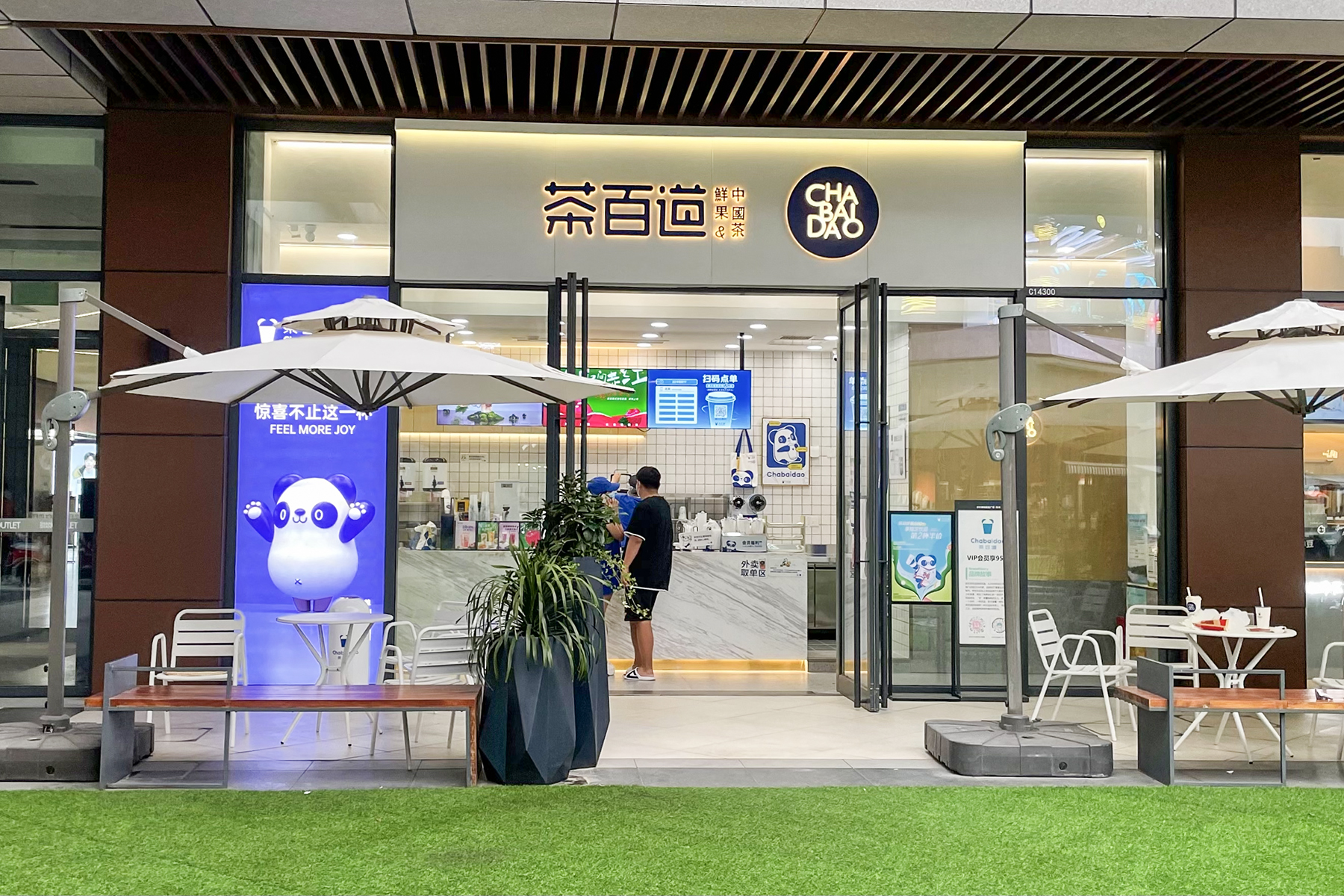
- Branch in Zhengzhou
- Trade name: ChaPanda
- Native name: 四川百茶百道实业股份有限公司
- Type: Public
- Traded as: SEHK: 2555
- Industry: Teahouse
- Founded: 2008; 18 years ago
- Founder: Wang Xiaokun
- Headquarters: Chengdu, Sichuan, China
- Key people: Wang Xiaokun (Chairman); Wang Hongxue (CEO)
- Website: www.chabaidao.com

Sichuan Baicha Baidao Industrial Co., Ltd. (ChaPanda; Chinese: 茶百道; pinyin: Chá Bǎidào), also known as Chabaidao, in Chinese, is a tea beverage brand in the People's Republic of China. ChaPanda is China's third-largest retailer of freshly made tea drinks and has a 6.8% market share, up from 6.6% in 2022. It operates mainly through franchises and has established a network of more than 8,000 stores since opening its first one in Chengdu, Sichuan, in 2008.

According to Frost & Sullivan's report, ChaPanda ranked third in the Chinese new-style tea store market in terms of 2023 retail sales, with a market share of 6.8%. In 2023, Chabaidao achieved RMB 16.9 billion in total retail sales, selling 1.016 billion cups of tea drinks, making it the second-largest new tea drink stock.

== History ==
Founded as a small shop near a school in 2008 in Chengdu, Sichuan Province, by Wang Xiaokun, ChaPanda opened its first store and managed to grow under Chengdu ChaPanda Catering Management Co., Ltd., which was established on February 21, 2017.

In 2018, ChaPanda decided to revamp its image by introducing a cute and clumsy blue panda mascot named Ding Ding Cat, which incorporated Chinese elements. This move significantly boosted brand recognition, reaching approximately 800 stores by the end of the year. By the end of 2020, the number of ChaPanda stores had surpassed 3,000.

During the pandemic, ChaPanda experienced a surge in growth, defying the overall market trend. In just nine months, the number of stores exceeded 3,000, making it a rising star in the tea beverage industry and earning it the nickname "King of Delivery".

According to the "National Meituan Takeout Sales" ranking released in June 2021, ChaPanda ranked third with a total of 10.563 million orders for the month, trailing only Wallace and Mixue Ice Cream & Tea. However, ChaPanda's average sales per store exceeded 3,000 orders, significantly surpassing other brands.

Earlier reports from Shanghai Securities Journal and other media outlets indicated that ChaPanda was planning an initial public offering (IPO) in Hong Kong with a target of raising approximately $500 million. ChaPanda successfully completed its IPO on the Hong Kong Stock Exchange on August 15, 2023, and was successfully listed on April 23, 2024.

Operating income has increased from 3.644 billion yuan in 2021 to 5.704 billion yuan by the end of 2023. Based on ChaPanda's pre-IPO valuation of 17.5 billion yuan, the net worth of Wang Xiaokun and his wife exceeds 14 billion yuan.

ChaPanda Store in Clementi Central, Singapore

In April 2024, ChaPanda entered the Korean market, followed by overseas stores including in France, Singapore, and the United States in 2025. In 2026, ChaPanda made its debut in Canada as TeaByDo.

== Controversies ==
In May 2021, ChaPanda (Changsha Shiji Jinyuan Store) was exposed for allegedly using expired ingredients during a surprise inspection by the Market Supervision Bureau. Law enforcement officials found that the labels on raw materials named "cake" and "raw coconut milk" in the freezer had expired. On May 28, in response to this incident, ChaPanda issued a statement on its official Weibo account, stating that, upon learning of the matter, the company immediately organized a special investigation team to look into the store. The results are as follows: After investigation, the "cake" and "raw coconut milk" in question during the random inspection were not expired raw materials. Both raw materials were prepared on-site at the store, and due to staff negligence, the expiration date labels were not replaced in time after preparation, resulting in the expiration date labels showing as expired during the inspection.

A blogger conducted undercover visits to four ChaPanda stores in different cities and discovered that all of them were using expired ingredients with replaced labels. The store employees claimed this was done to avoid detection by regulatory authorities. The topic "ChaPanda uses expired raw materials" became a trending topic on September 30, sparking widespread concern.

On 6 October, a female customer in Ningbo, Zhejiang Province, reported finding a spider in the milk cap of a beverage ordered from a ChaPanda store in Cixi. The customer stated she had already reported the incident to the relevant authorities. ChaPanda staff responded that no spiders were found during preparation, and the customer reported the issue hours after receiving the drink. The store is negotiating 600 yuan in compensation with the customer. The incident quickly became the top-trending topic on Weibo.

In the aftermath of Fat Cat's suicide, when people ordered fast food deliveries to commemorate him, multiple restaurants delivered empty packages, including ChaPanda. Upon realizing the issue, ChaPanda issued an apology. Additionally, both ChaPanda and Wallace announced the dismissal of the employees involved in the incident. ChaPanda also made a 1 million RMB donation to the Sichuan Youth Development Foundation in Fat Cat's name.
