= Yingzhou Subdistrict =

Subdistrict in Fuzhou, Fujian, China

Yingzhou Subdistrict 瀛州街道
- Subdistrict
- Location in Fujian
- Coordinates: 26.0588°N 119.3156°E
- Country: People's Republic of China
- Province: Fujian
- Prefecture-level city: Fuzhou
- District: Taijiang
- Time zone: UTC+8 (China Standard)

Yingzhou Subdistrict (瀛洲街道) is a subdistrict of Taijiang District, Fuzhou, Fujian, China.

== See also ==
- List of township-level divisions of Fujian
