= Dicos =

Chinese fast food restaurant chain

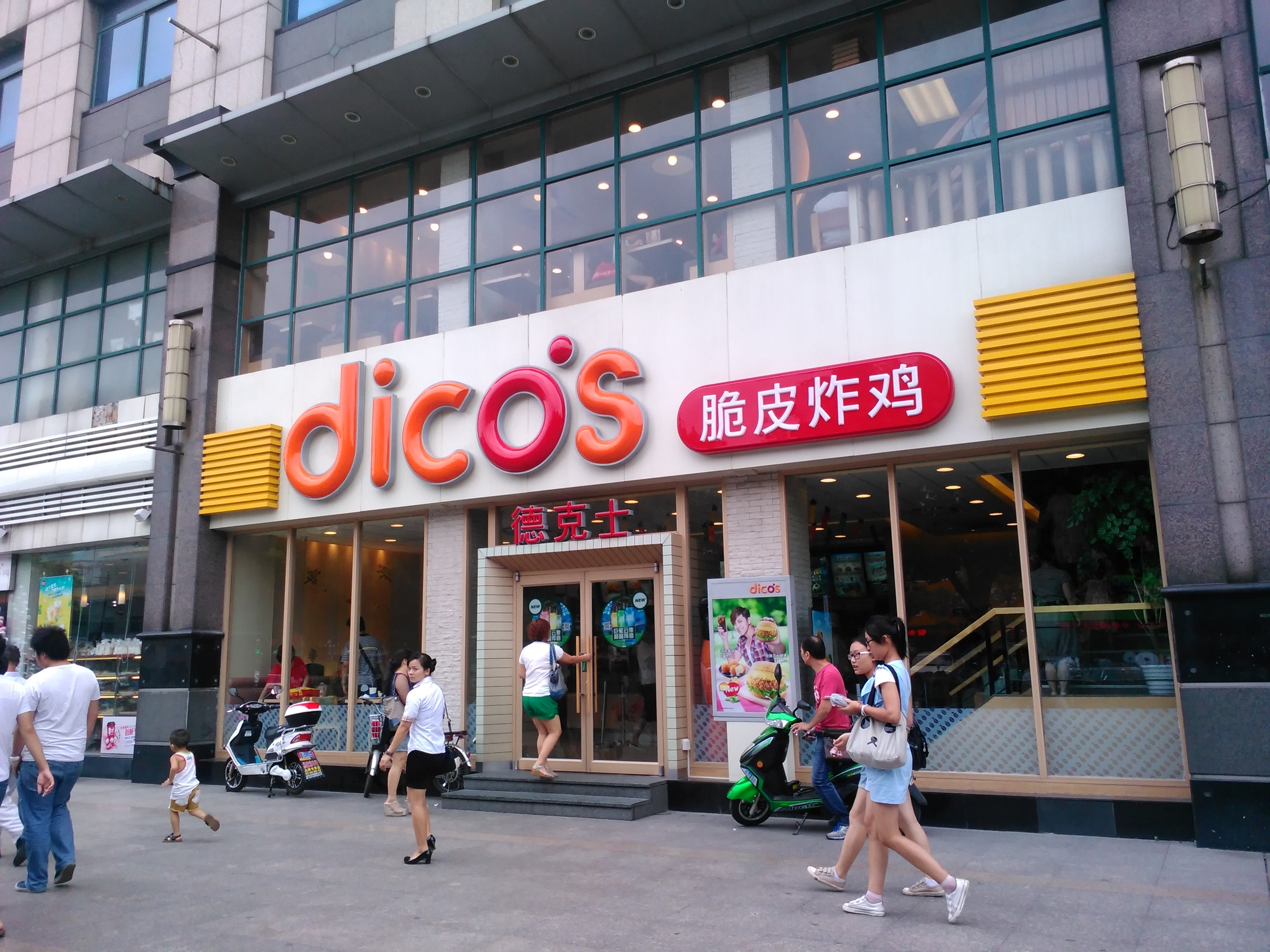
- A Dicos in Shanghai
- Company type: Public
- Founded: 1994; 32 years ago
- Products: Hamburgers, fried chicken, French fries, soft drinks, coffee, soup
- Website: www.dicos.com.cn

Dicos (stylized as dico͘s, Chinese: 德克士; pinyin: Dékèshì) is a Chinese fast-food restaurant chain owned by the Tianjin Ding Qiao Food Service. The chain ranks third among China's top three fast-food enterprises, as it has almost as many restaurants in China as McDonald's. The chain was founded in 1994 in Chengdu, Sichuan, China.

== Corporate ==
The head office is in the 10th floor, Building A of the Baichuan Building (S: 百川大厦, P: Bǎichuān Dàshà) in Jinjiang District, Chengdu. The company has offices in Chongqing, Guiyang, Wuhan, and Changsha.

In 2010, the total combined sales at Dico's and CNHLS (Wallace) was US$1.3 billion (8.1 billion renminbi).

== Advertising ==
The company announced a multi-year sponsorship deal with the NBA in April 2019. The deal featured "NBA-themed meals, in-store decoration and family activities across its 2,500 outlets in China." Following controversial comments by Houston Rockets General Manager Daryl Morey regarding demonstrations in Hong Kong in October 2019, the company quickly suspended its marketing deal with the NBA. It was among 11 Chinese sponsors of the NBA that either terminated or suspended its relationship with the NBA following Morey's comments.

== See also ==
- List of hamburger restaurants
