= Auntea Jenny =

Chinese milk tea franchise

Auntea Jenny Shanghai Industrial Co., Ltd.

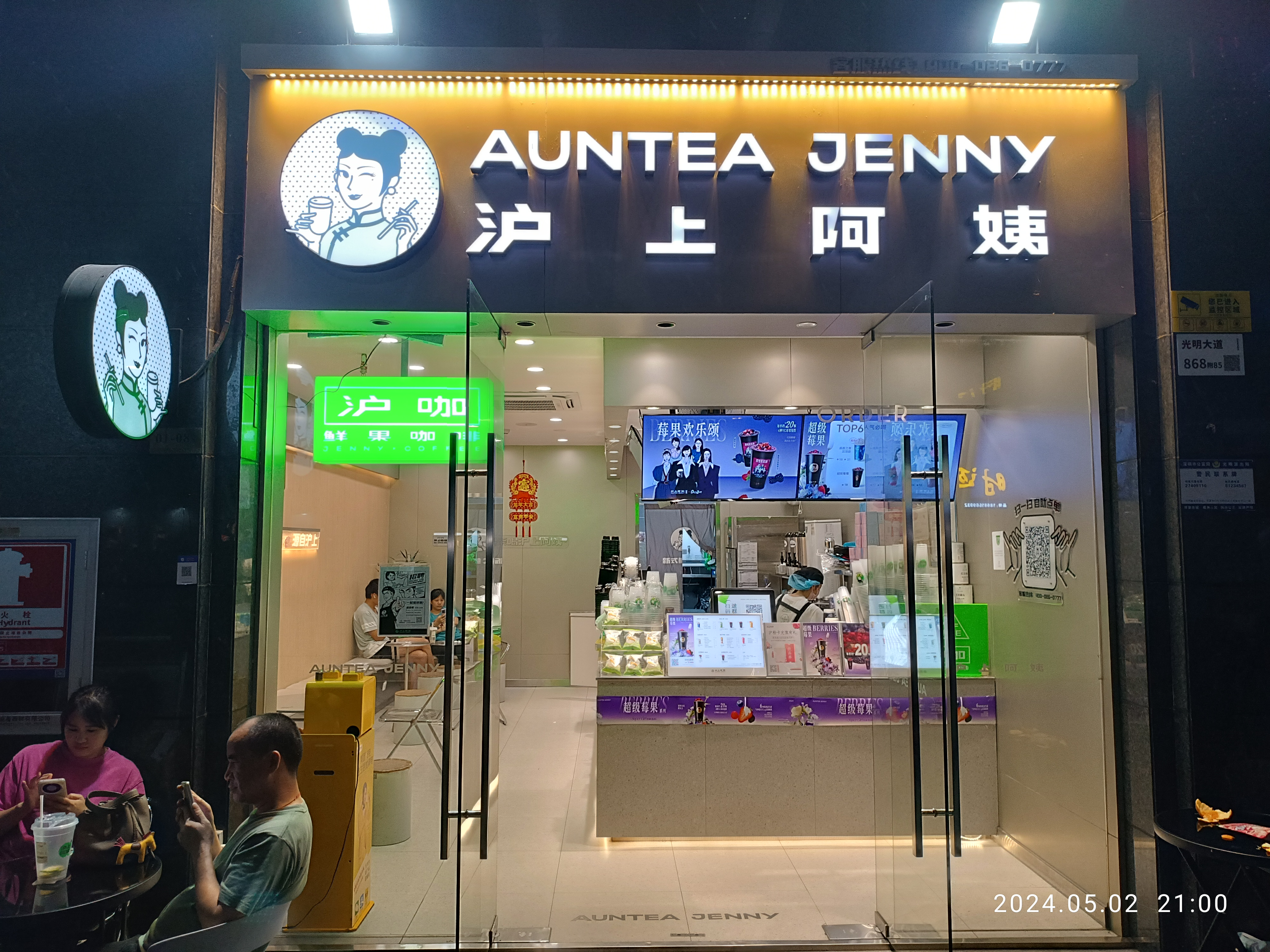
- An Auntea Jenny outlet in Shenzhen, China
- Native name: 沪上阿姨（上海）实业股份有限公司
- Type: Public
- Traded as: SEHK: 2589
- Industry: Drink
- Founded: 2013; 13 years ago
- Headquarters: Shanghai
- Number of locations: 9,367 stores (2025)
- Website: www.hsay.com

Auntea Jenny Shanghai Industrial Co., Ltd. (Chinese: 沪上阿姨; pinyin: Hù shàng āyí; lit. 'Auntie Shanghai') is a Chinese milk tea chain. As of 2025, the brand had opened 9,367 locations, making it one of the largest tea franchises in the world.

Auntea Jenny began trading on the Hong Kong Stock Exchange in May 2025 after raising K$273 million with a listing price of HK$113.12.

== History ==
Auntea Jenny was founded by husband-and-wife Shan Weijun and Zhou Rongrong in 2013. On July 18, 2013, its first store opened in People's Square of Shanghai, and became successful with monthly profits of over 400,000 yuan.

In the years after its founding, Auntea Jenny expanded rapidly, focusing on lower-tier cities for development. In 2018, there were over one thousand stores nationwide. In 2019, the brand changed its logo to a woman with a bun, wearing a cheongsam and holding a cup of milk tea. By 2020, the total number of stores exceeded 2,000, and completed a nearly RMB 100 million Series A financing round with Jiayu Capital. By 2023 the number of stores had grown to over 6,000.

In February 2023, an illustration on the packaging of the brand's tea cup sparked debate on Chinese social media. The illustration showed a woman wearing a high-cut cheongsam with her thigh exposed at the slit. Posts on Weibo about the image received more than 290 million views, with some users criticizing the advertisement as overly sexualized, while others defended the image. The Jinshan Market Supervision Bureau reviewed the image and found it did not violate Chinese advertising law.

In February 2024, Auntea Jenny opened its first overseas location opened in Kuala Lumpur, Malaysia. Later that year, the brand updated their logo to its current iteration, featuring a smiling woman with a bob shaped haircut, colored in orange.

On May 8, 2025, the company went public through an initial public offering on the Hong Kong Stock Exchange, raising HK$273 million (US$35 million). During the same month, Auntea Jenny launched its first American location in Queens, New York. The two founders have an estimated combined net worth of US$1.7 billion.

In February 2026, the company opened a store in Soho, London.
