= Shanghai Subdistrict =

Shanghai Subdistrict 上海街道
- Subdistrict
- Location in Fujian
- Coordinates: 26°4′17″N 119°17′25″E
- Country: People's Republic of China
- Province: Fujian
- Prefecture-level city: Fuzhou
- District: Taijiang District
- Time zone: UTC+8 (China Standard)

Shanghai Subdistrict (Chinese: 上海街道; pinyin: Shànghǎi Jiēdào) is a subdistrict in Taijiang District, Fuzhou, Fujian province, China. As of 2020, it has 7 residential communities under its administration:

- Mudan Community (牡丹社区)
- Shanghaixinyuan Community (上海新苑社区)
- Heshang Community (河上社区)
- Fenghuang Community (凤凰社区)
- Xiyang Community (西洋社区)
- Jiaotong Community (交通社区)
- Wanxiang Community (万象社区)

== See also ==
- List of township-level divisions of Fujian
