= Tastien =

Chinese fast food restaurant chain

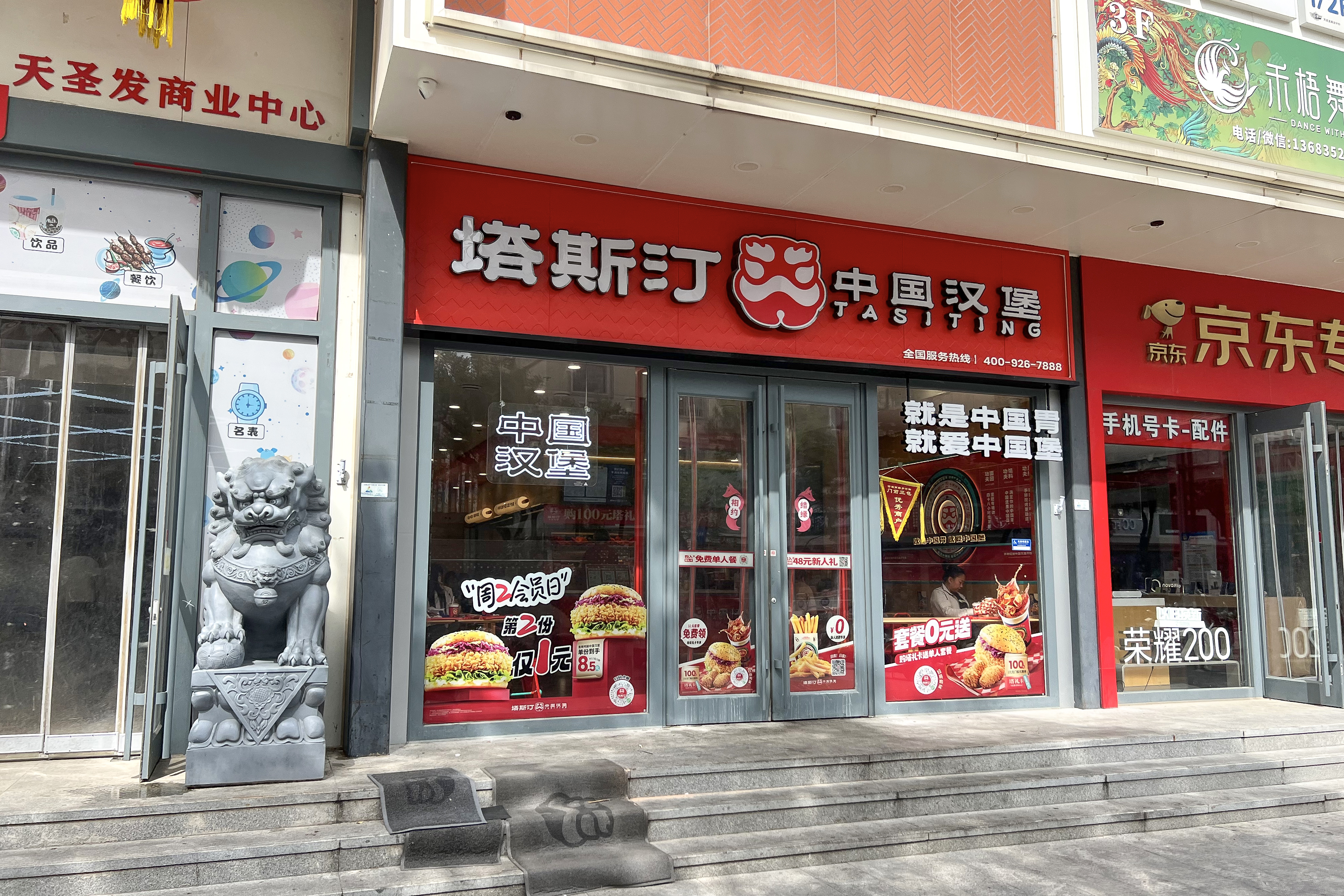
- Tastien burger at a location in Shijingshan
- Native name: 塔斯汀
- Type: Private
- Industry: Fast food
- Founded: 2012
- Products: Chinese-style burgers, fast food
- Website: tasiting.com

Tastien (Chinese: 塔斯汀; pinyin: Tǎsītīng) is a Chinese fast‑food restaurant chain that specializes in Chinese‑style burgers made with hand‑rolled, freshly baked flatbreads and fillings that reference local dishes. The company was founded in 2012 and is headquartered in Fuzhou, Fujian.

As of April 2024, Tastien has 7,254 locations across 342 cities in China.

== History ==
Tastien was founded in 2012 and initially operated as a pizza business. It began selling burgers in 2017, and in 2019 it marketed a “Chinese hamburger” concept. The company emphasized hand‑rolled buns made with traditional pastry techniques and promoted fillings that reference Chinese dishes.

== Products and marketing ==
Tastien was established as part of a broader movement known as neo-Chinese style, which blends traditional Chinese culture with modern approaches. The chain's main dish is a Western burger with Chinese bread pockets, often filled with classic Chinese dishes such as Yuxiang shredded pork and Mapo tofu. Tastien's menu items are 30-40% cheaper than comparable items from major Western fast food brands.

Tastien's buns and minced meat are inspired by roujiamo, a traditional snack from Shaanxi province in Northwest China.

== Operations and expansion ==
Coverage in international business media has highlighted Tastien's fast expansion and a footprint that extends deeply into lower‑tier Chinese cities.
