= Home Original Chicken =

Chinese fast food chain

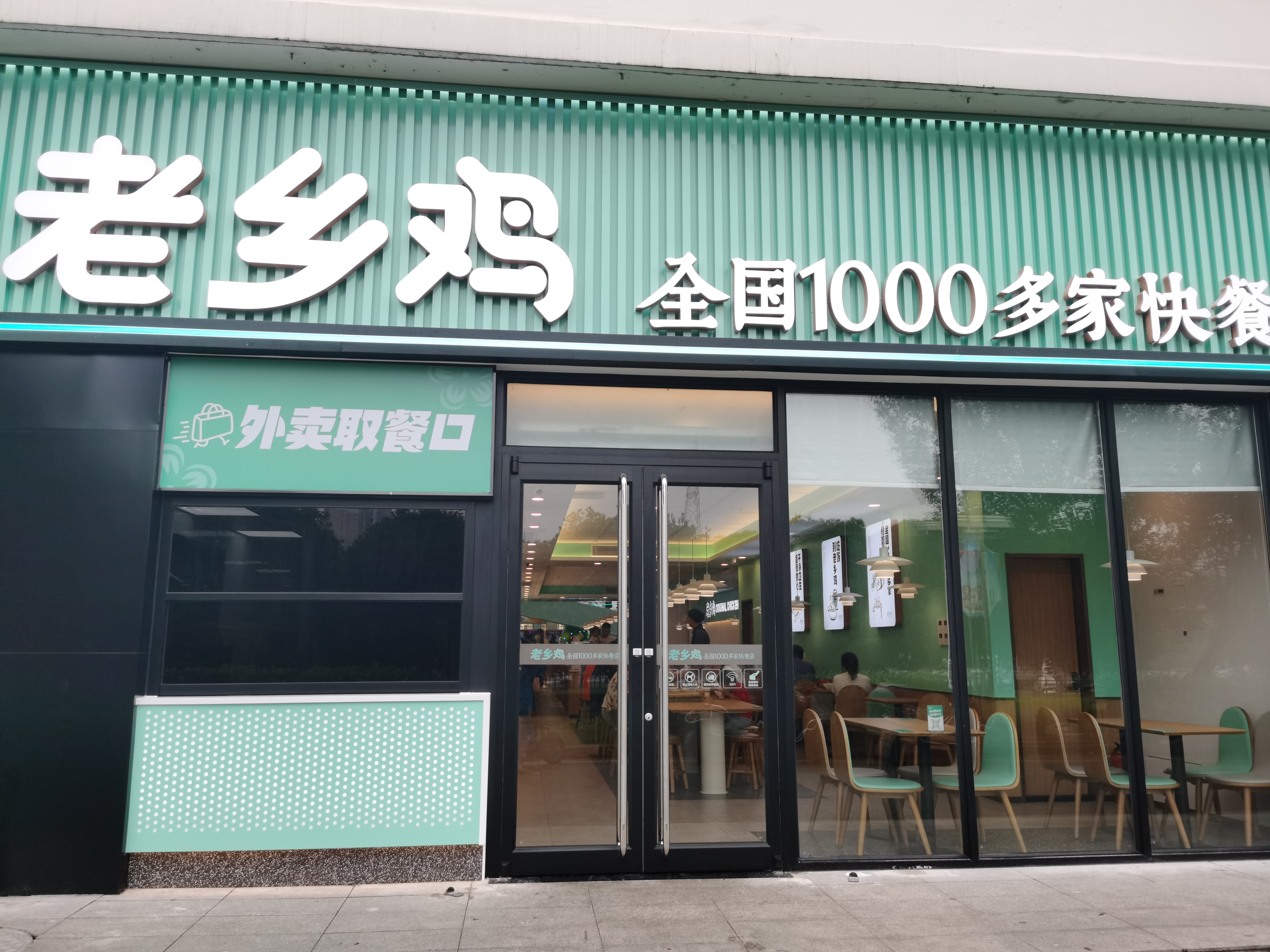
Home Original Chicken restaurant in Xingtang, Suzhou

Home Original Chicken Co. Ltd (simplified Chinese: 老乡鸡集团; traditional Chinese: 老鄉雞集團; pinyin: Lǎoxiāng jī jítuán "Hometown Chicken") is a Chinese fast food chain headquartered in Hefei, Anhui.

Shu Congxuan (simplified Chinese: 束从轩; traditional Chinese: 束從軒) founded the company and, as of 2013, is its director. As of that year, it was the largest fast-food company in Anhui Province. As of 2024, the company has 1404 restaurants nationwide.

== History ==
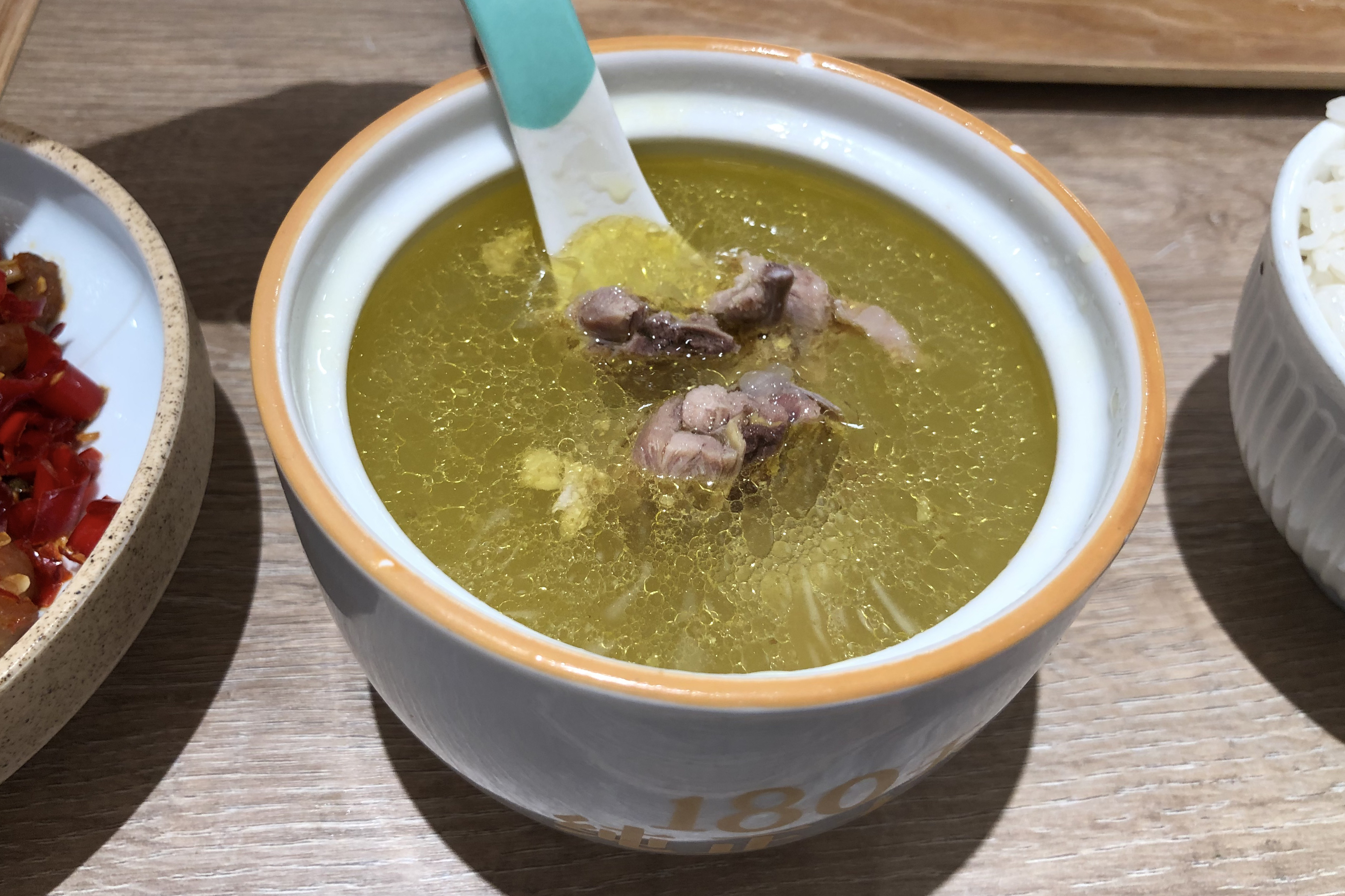
Chicken soup is the signature dish of Home Original Chicken

Shu Congxuan, a chicken breeder, decided to start a fast food chain after attending a three-day course in 1999. the company was established in 2003. The chain was originally called FEIXI The Old Hens [sic] (肥西老母鸡; Féixī lǎo mǔjī "Feixi Old Hens"), after an Anhui dish. The full corporate name in Chinese was 安徽肥西老母鸡集团, and the company previously had its headquarters in the New Cityscape Plaza (新都会购物广场; Xīndūhuì Gòuwùguǎngchǎng) shopping mall in Hefei. By 2011 the Anhui-area authorities designated the restaurant chain as a "Prestigious Chinese Brand". It later moved its headquarters to another place in Hefei.

In 2011 a consulting firm suggested that the restaurant chain change its name. It suggested using a three character name since a five-character name would be lengthy. The change was also made because Chinese from other provinces were unfamiliar with the old name. The chain received its current name in March 2012. There was an initial outcry when the names of the locations were changed, but the company continued its success after the name change.

In 2015, the company has over 240 restaurants in Anhui.
