= Pala Hamburger =

Chinese fast food restaurant chain

Pala Catering Management Co Ltd
- Traditional Chinese: 武漢派樂餐飲管理有限公司
- Simplified Chinese: 武汉派乐餐饮管理有限公司
Transcriptions
Standard Mandarin
- Hanyu Pinyin: Wǔhàn Pàilè Cānyǐn Guǎnlǐ Yǒuxiàngōngsī

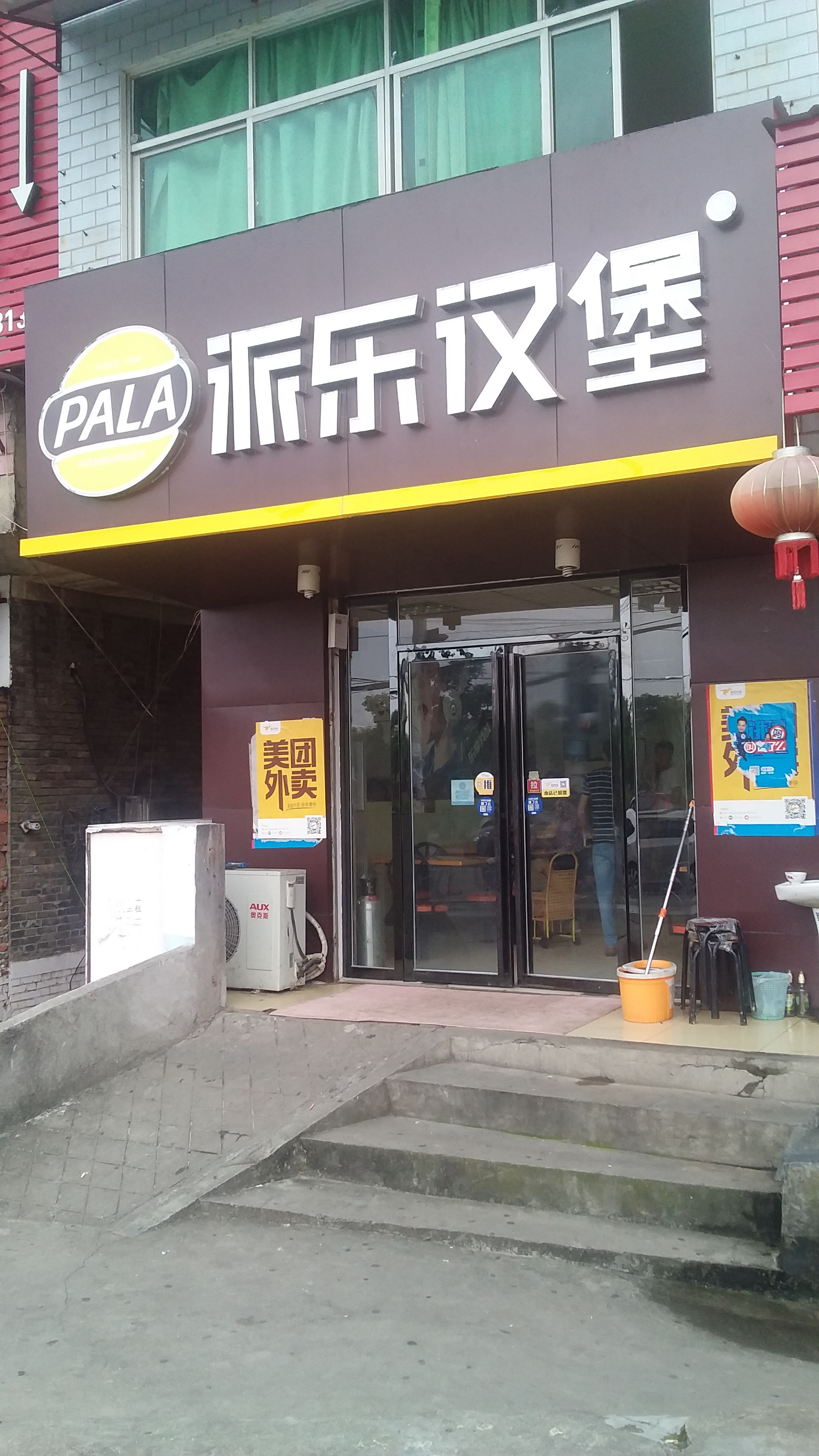
Pala Hamburger shop in Ji'an, Jiangxi

Pala Catering Management Co Ltd, doing business as Pala Hamburger (simplified Chinese: 派乐汉堡; traditional Chinese: 派樂漢堡; pinyin: Pàilè Hànbǎo), is a Chinese fast food chain headquartered in the Wuhan CBD (武汉中央商务区). The first store opened in Wuhan in 1999. Ke Zhaoyan, the marketing manager, stated that Pala opened in smaller cities and towns because its food is cheaper compared to that of Western-owned companies. In 2012 the company had about 1,000 franchised stores and about 400 direct sale stores with plans to open an additional 460 stores. The number of stores grew to 1,700 in 2012, and 2013 to 1,850. In 2014 China Daily ranked Pala as No. 6 of the "Top 10 fast-food chains in China".
