= Shanghai (photograph) =

Photograph by Andreas Gurksy

Shanghai (2000) by Andreas Gursky

Shanghai is a color photograph by German photographer Andreas Gursky created in 2000. The photograph has variable large dimensions, with the one held at the Art Institute of Chicago having 306 by 206 cm, and has a six prints edition.

== Description ==
Gursky took aim at hotel lobbies, among other subjects, in the 1990s. The current photograph was created after he took three pictures in the monumental atrium of the Grand Hyatt Hotel in Shanghai, China. He afterwards used digital manipulation of the images taken of the hotel first three floors to give the background the same resolution as the foreground. The picture tends to abstraction and is impressive in his visual scale of a towering space and the vivid yellow color, in which the floor almost comes out of the viewers angle. Some human figures are barely visible in the floors. Human presence, despite being the main purpose of the hotel existence, is almost entirely absent and even seems secondary to the purpose of the photograph. Sotheby's, London website states that "Neighbours for the duration of their stay, the lives of the hundreds of guests in the hotel are unlikely to cross paths again. In Gursky's vision, a familiar scene of a hotel is rendered strangely foreign, forcing a critical reappraisal of the spatial organisation of our everyday lives. As we peer into this microcosm of society, we are increasingly aware of the chaos concealed within the ostensibly ordered exterior."

== Art market ==
A print of the photograph was sold by $1,632,230 on 1 July 2015, at Sotheby's, London.

== Public collections ==
There are prints of this photograph at The Art Institute of Chicago, the San Francisco Museum of Modern Art, the Princeton University Art Museum, and the Museo Nacional Centro de Arte Reina Sofía, in Madrid.
