= Naisnow =

Chinese tea drink chain

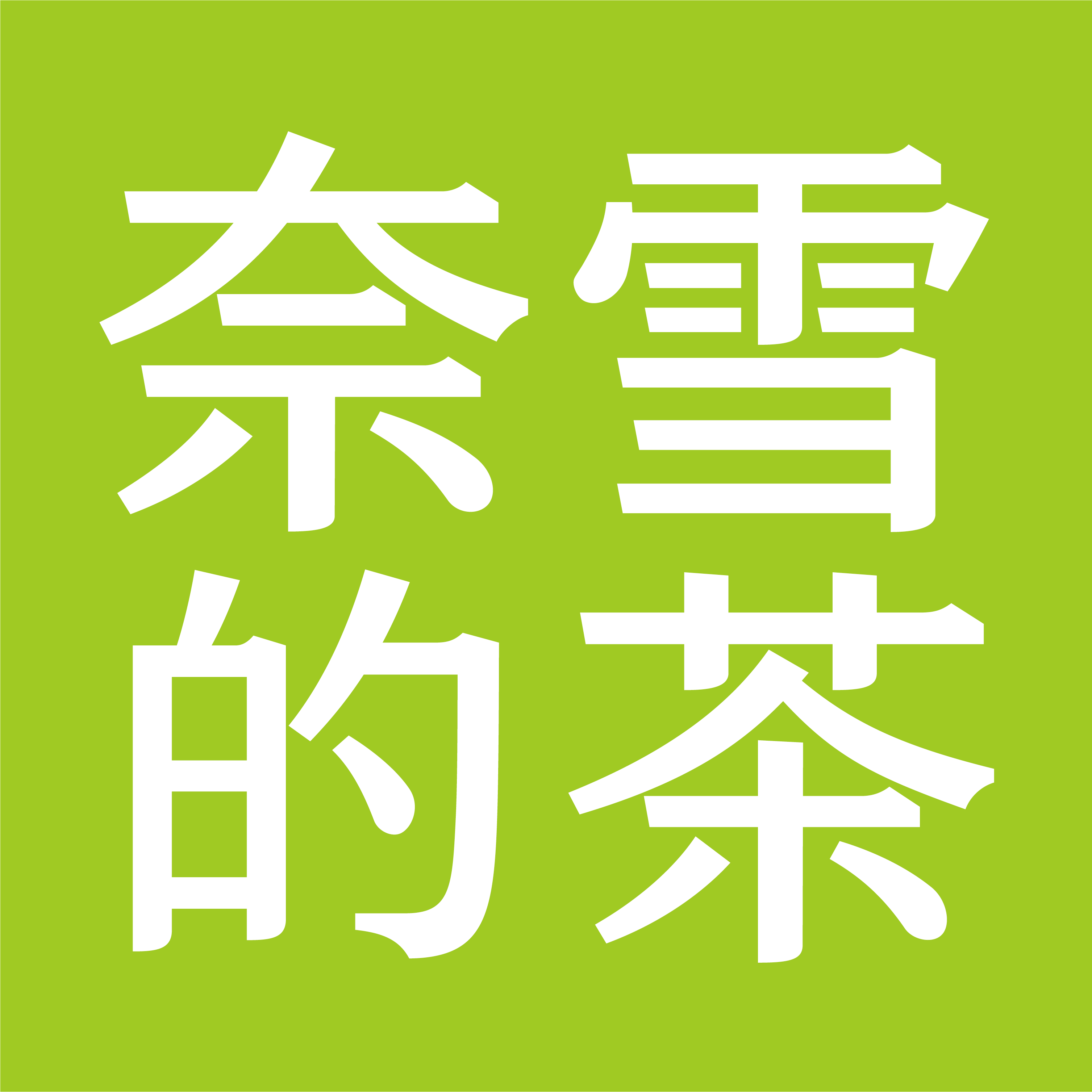
- Trade name: Naisnow
- Native name: 奈雪的茶控股有限公司
- Formerly: Naixue, Nayuki
- Type: Public
- Traded as: SEHK: 2150
- Industry: Teahouse
- Founded: May 2014; 12 years ago
- Founders: Peng Xin; Zhao Lin
- Headquarters: Shenzhen, Guangdong, China
- Key people: Zhao Lin (Chairman & CEO); Peng Xin (General manager)
- Revenue: ▲CN¥5.16 billion (2023)
- Net income: ▲CN¥11.17 million (2023)
- Total assets: ▲CN¥7.54 billion (2023)
- Total equity: ▲CN¥4.82 billion (2023)
- Number of employees: 7,199 (2023)
- Subsidiaries: Lelecha
- Website: www.naixuecha.com

Nayuki Holdings Limited (known under the brand name Naisnow; Chinese: 奈雪的茶; pinyin: Nàixuě de Chá) is a publicly listed Chinese teahouse chain founded in 2014 and headquartered in Shenzhen. It focuses on the premium segment. As of September 2024, it has 1,926 franchised locations.

== Background ==
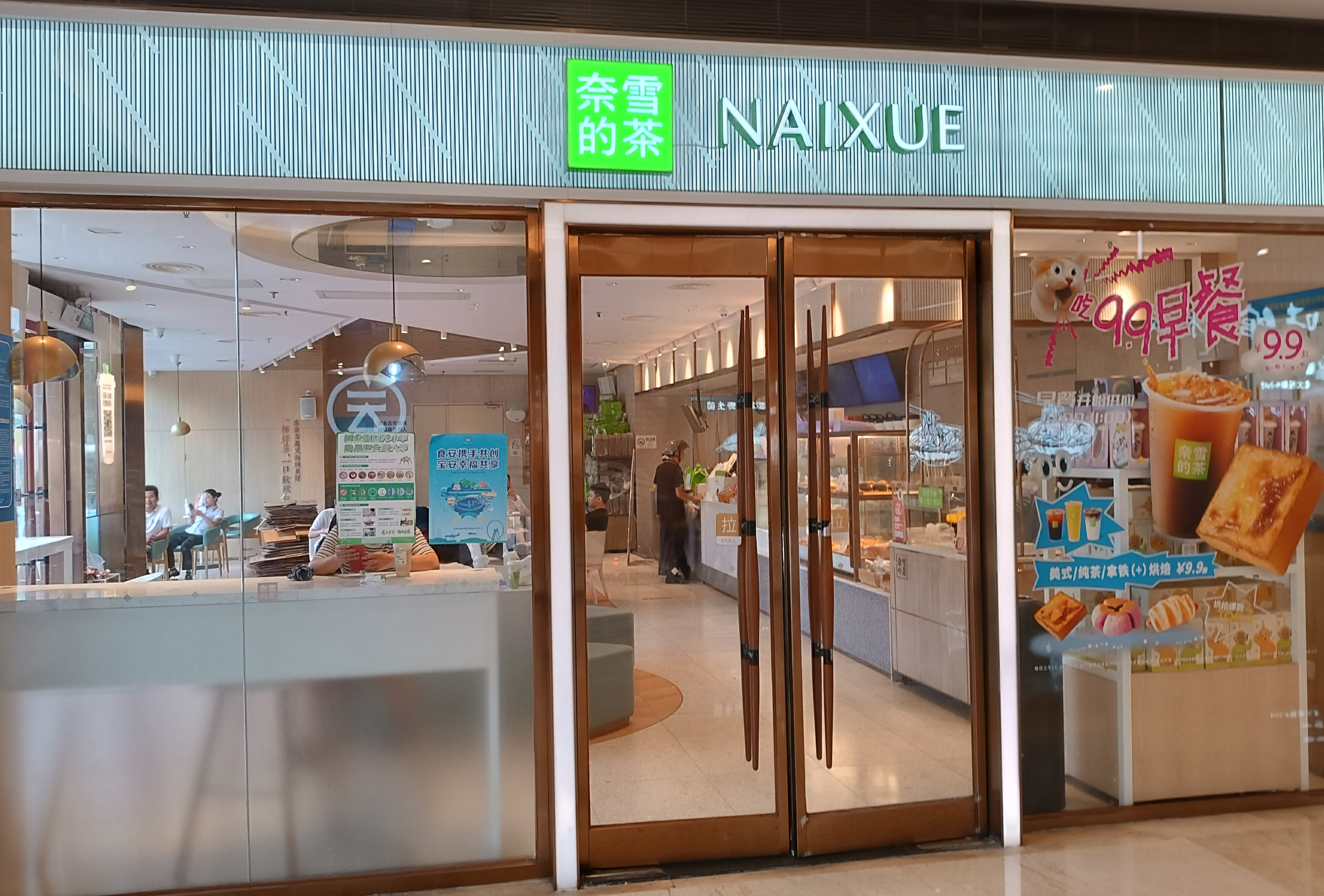
Branch in Bao'an, Shenzhen

The company was originally founded as Nayuki by Peng Xin and her husband Zhao Lin. The name came after a handle that Peng used online.

Naisnow's target demographic was professional women in their twenties to mid-thirties which Peng noticed have a fondness for milk tea products. As a result, Naisnow aimed to create a space suitable for socialising that met the needs of the modern urban woman. As milk tea shops were considered low-end, Naisnow worked on changing this image by focusing on the design of the stores and the quality of its drinks and cups.

Naisnow's first physical store was opened in the Excellence Century Plaza with two more locations opened shortly afterwards. The founders used the mortgage of their house as leverage.

On 30 June 2021, Naisnow held its initial public offering (IPO) to become a listed company on the Hong Kong Stock Exchange. It was first upscale teahouse chain to be listed in Hong Kong and the offering raised US$656 million. On its trading debut, shares opened 4.7% lower.

In August 2021, Naisnow gained public attention when Xinhua reported that some of its stores violated food safety and health rules. Two stores in the Beijing were discovered to have cockroaches and rotten fruits. Nayuki said mainland authorities found no food safety problems and pledged to conduct self-inspections of all of its stores.

In December 2022, Naisnow changed its brand name in China by replacing a Japanese possessive particle の in its Chinese name with a Chinese character meaning the same. It also changed its English name to Naixue which is the pinyin pronunciation. The company aimed to 'de-Japanify' and reposition itself as a 'China chic' brand. In the same month, Naisnow acquired a 43.64% stake in its rival Lelecha for US$75 million.

In recent times, Naisnow's financial performance has disappointed investors with its stock price being down 90% since its IPO. During the COVID-19 pandemic, many of its stores were closed and sales suffered. In addition growth had slowed down. In 2023, Naixue changed its business model by entering the franchising business which aimed to help it catch up to its local rivals.
