= Wallace (fast food chain) =

Chinese fast food restaurant chain

Wallace 华莱士
- One Of Wallace's logos

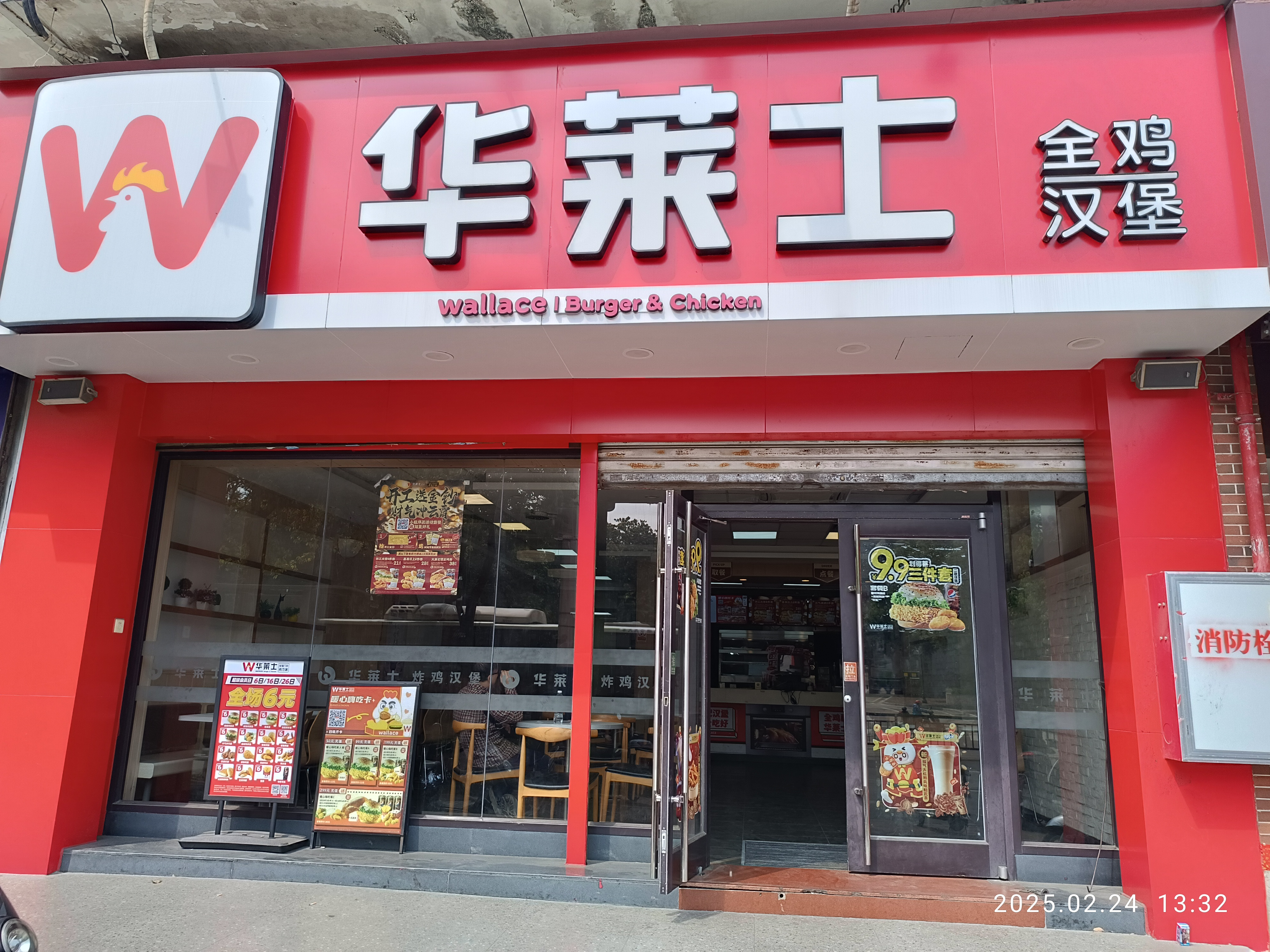
- CNHLS (Wallace) restaurant
- Trade name: Wallace, Fujian Food Co., Ltd.
- Type: Privately held company
- Founded: 2000; 26 years ago
- Headquarters: Taijiang District, Fuzhou, Fujian, China
- Number of locations: 20,065

Fujian Wallace Food Co., Ltd. (Chinese: 福建省华莱士食品股份有限公司), doing business as Wallace (simplified Chinese: 华莱士; traditional Chinese: 華萊士; pinyin: Huáláishì), previously as CNHLS, is a fast food chain in China. Its head office is in Taijiang District, Fuzhou, Fujian.

CNHLS's sales reached $407 million USD in 2010, an increase of 416% over its 2007 total. In 2012, the company had about 3,000 restaurants, and this number grew to about 4,000 in 2013. The restaurant was No. 2 in the China Daily list of the "Top 10 fast-food chains in China".

== History ==
In January 2001, Hua Huaiyu and Hua Huaiqing, originally from Wenzhou, opened the first Wallace fast-food restaurant in Fuzhou, near Fuzhou Normal University. Initially, they mimicked the menu and prices of Western giants KFC and McDonald's, but customers preferred the original establishments. The brothers then launched a "Special 1-2-3 Price" promotion (1 yuan for a Coke, 2 yuan for chicken thighs, and 3 yuan for a hamburger), which doubled their sales.

Since 2005, Wallace has rapidly expanded its affordable, Western-style fast-food chain, leasing small spaces in shopping malls and residential complexes, as well as around universities and colleges, while offering the lowest franchise fees. In 2010, Wallace sales reached $407 million, a 416% increase over 2007. By 2012, the company had approximately 3,000 chain restaurants, a number that increased to approximately 4,000 in 2013.

In January 2014, the number of Wallace restaurants nationwide exceeded 4,800, surpassing KFC's 4,600 restaurants for the first time. The company's sales reached $600 million, but net profit remained low due to its pricing policy. In April 2016, Hua Lai Shi listed on the National Exchange of Securities and Quotations in Beijing (NEEQ). By the end of 2018, the number of Wallace restaurants had reached 10,000.

In 2021, Wallace ranked among the top ten largest restaurant chains in China. At the beginning of 2023, Wallace's number of establishments exceeded 20,000 (in terms of network size, the company ranked first in China, significantly surpassing its closest competitors, KFC and McDonald's).
