= Mixue Ice Cream & Tea =

Chinese multinational restaurant chain

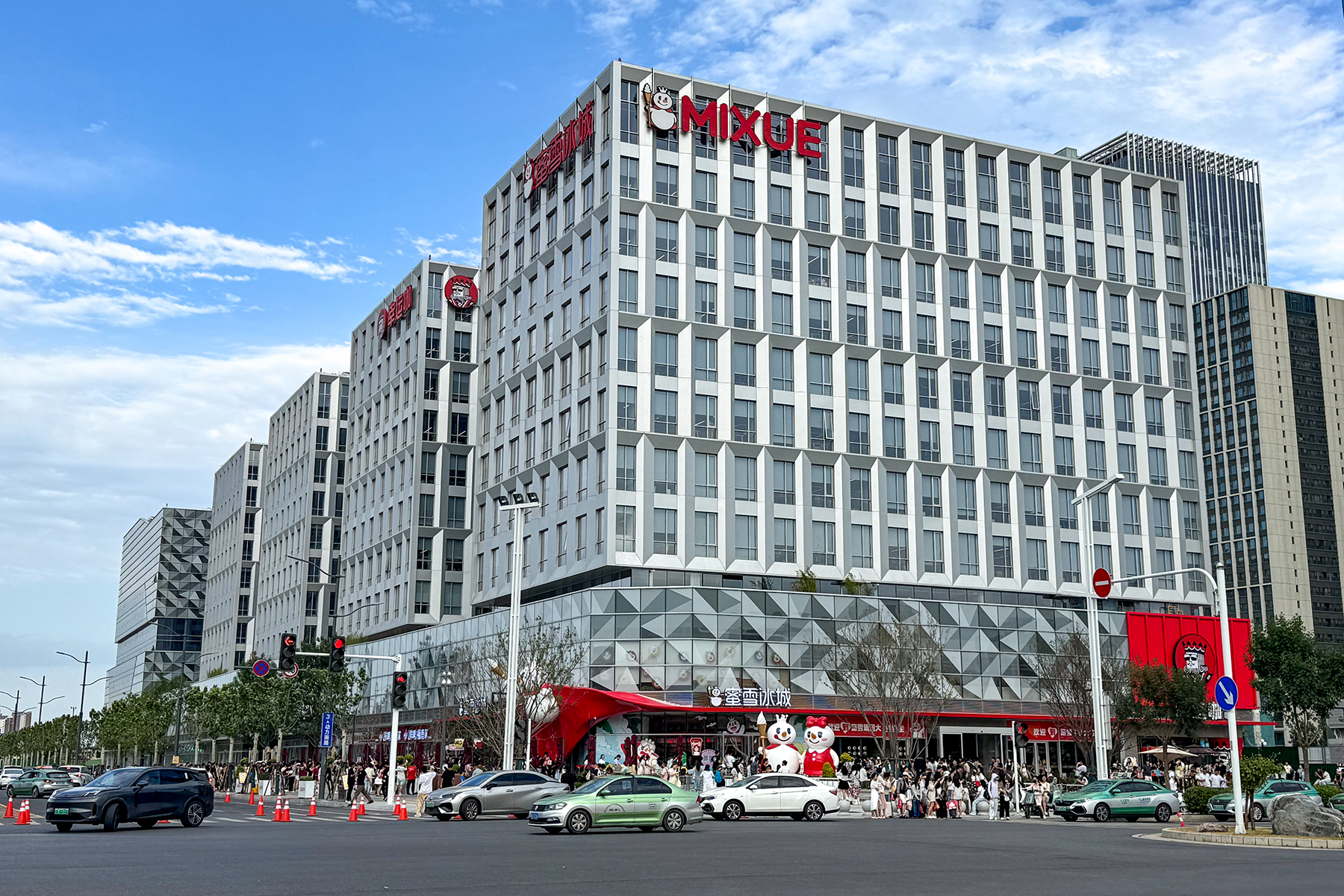
- Headquarters of Mixue in Zhengzhou, China
- Type: Public
- Traded as: SEHK: 2097
- Industry: Restaurant
- Genre: Ice cream parlor Beverage
- Founded: June 1997; 29 years ago in Zhengzhou, China
- Founder: Zhang Hongchao
- Headquarters: Zhengzhou, Henan, China
- Number of locations: 59,823 (December 31, 2025)
- Area served: Australia, Brazil, Cambodia, Hong Kong, Indonesia, Japan, Kazakhstan, Kenya, Kyrgyzstan, Laos, Macau, Mainland China, Malaysia, Mexico, Mongolia, Myanmar, Philippines, Singapore, South Korea, Thailand, Vietnam and United States
- Key people: Zhang Hongchao (Chairman); Koshigan (CEO)
- Products: Ice cream, bubble tea, and tea
- Revenue: ▲RMB33.56 billion ($4.95 billion) (2025)
- Operating income: ▲RMB7.29 billion ($1.08 billion) (2025)
- Net income: ▲RMB5.9 billion ($0.87 billion) (2025)
- Parent: MIXUEBINGCHENG Co., Ltd
- Website: mxbc.com

Chinese name
- Chinese: 蜜雪冰城
- Literal meaning: Honey Snow Ice City
- Hanyu Pinyin: Mìxuě Bīngchéng

Mixue Ice Cream & Tea (Chinese: 蜜雪冰城; pinyin: Mìxuě bīngchéng; lit. 'honey snow ice city', ME-shweh) is a Chinese multinational restaurant chain specializing in ice cream and tea-based drinks. It was founded in 1997 in Zhengzhou by Zhang Hongchao.

At the end of 2025, it operated almost 60,000 stores in China and overseas, making it the world's largest food-service chain by number of stores. Most locations are franchised and the company generates a large share of its revenue by supplying ingredients, equipment, and packaging to franchisees. Its menu emphasizes low-priced items such as soft-serve ice cream and milk tea.

Mixue's parent company, Mixue Group (MIXUEBINGCHENG Co., Ltd.; Chinese: 蜜雪冰城股份有限公司; pinyin: Mìxuě bīngchéng gǔfèn yǒuxiàn gōngsī), is listed on the Hong Kong Stock Exchange. The initial public offering raised about HK$3.45 billion (approximately US$444 million at the time) and the shares rose by about 40–47% on the first day of trading.

== History ==
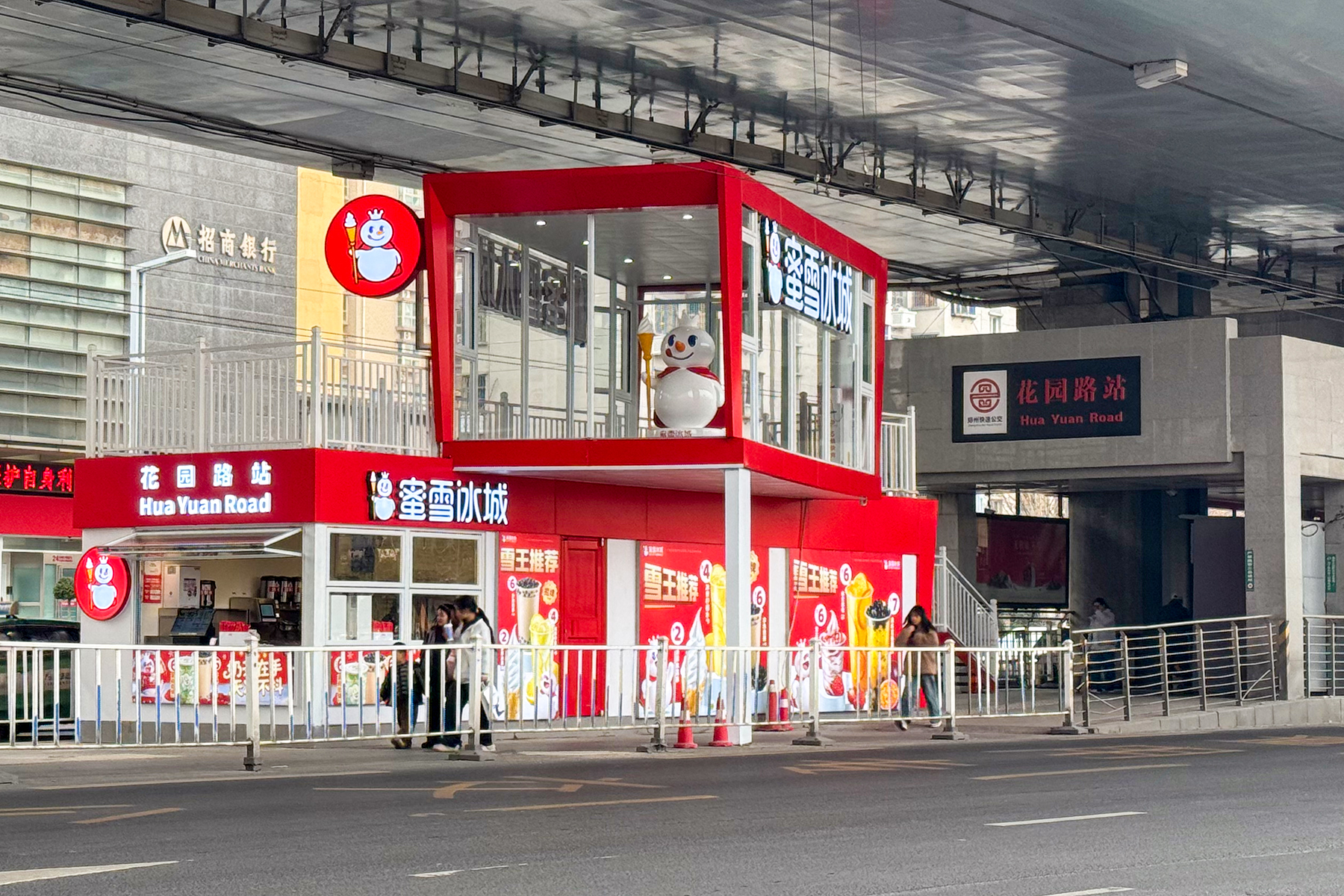
Mixue branch in Zhengzhou

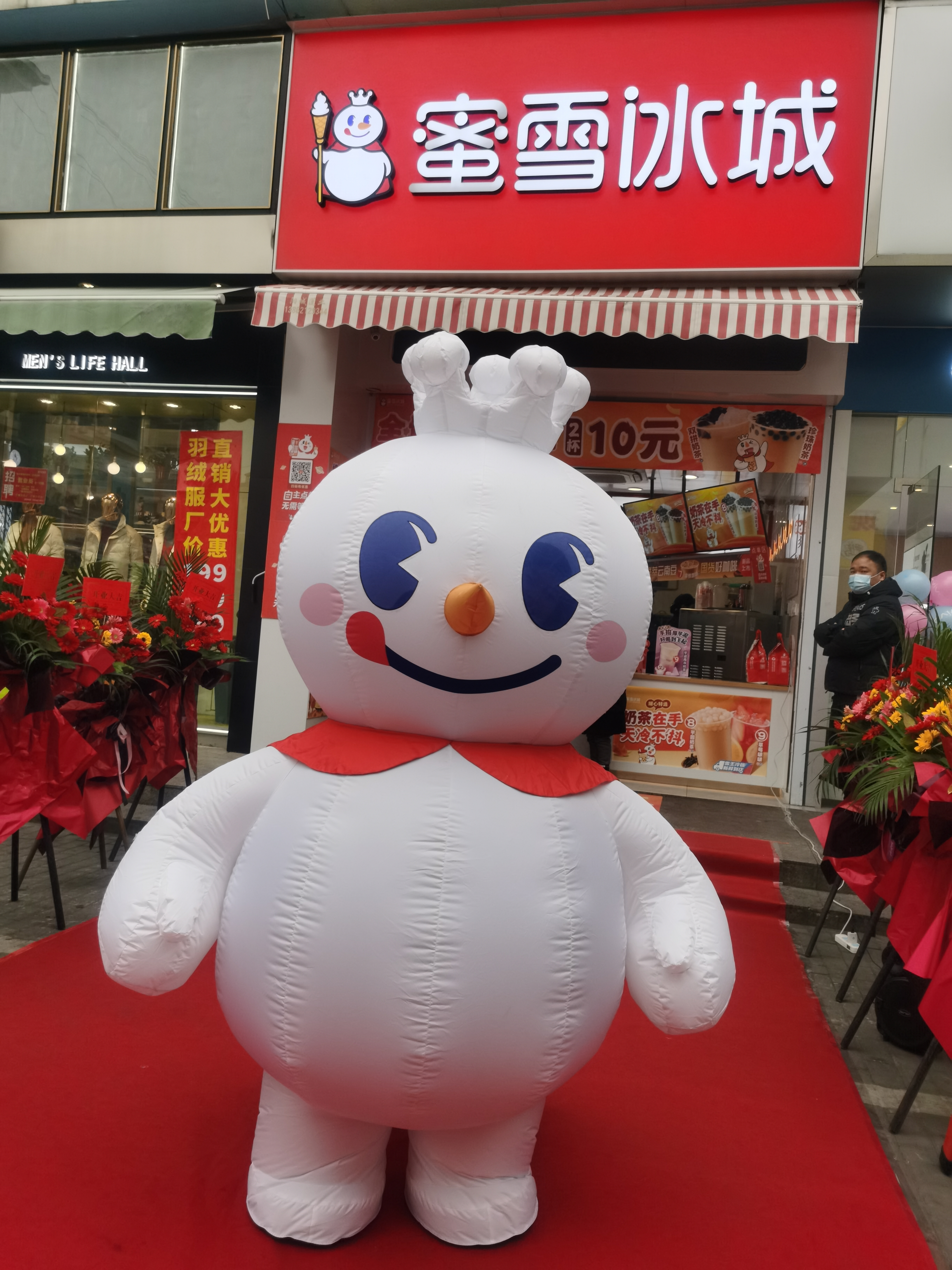
Mixue's mascot, "Snow King" (雪王)

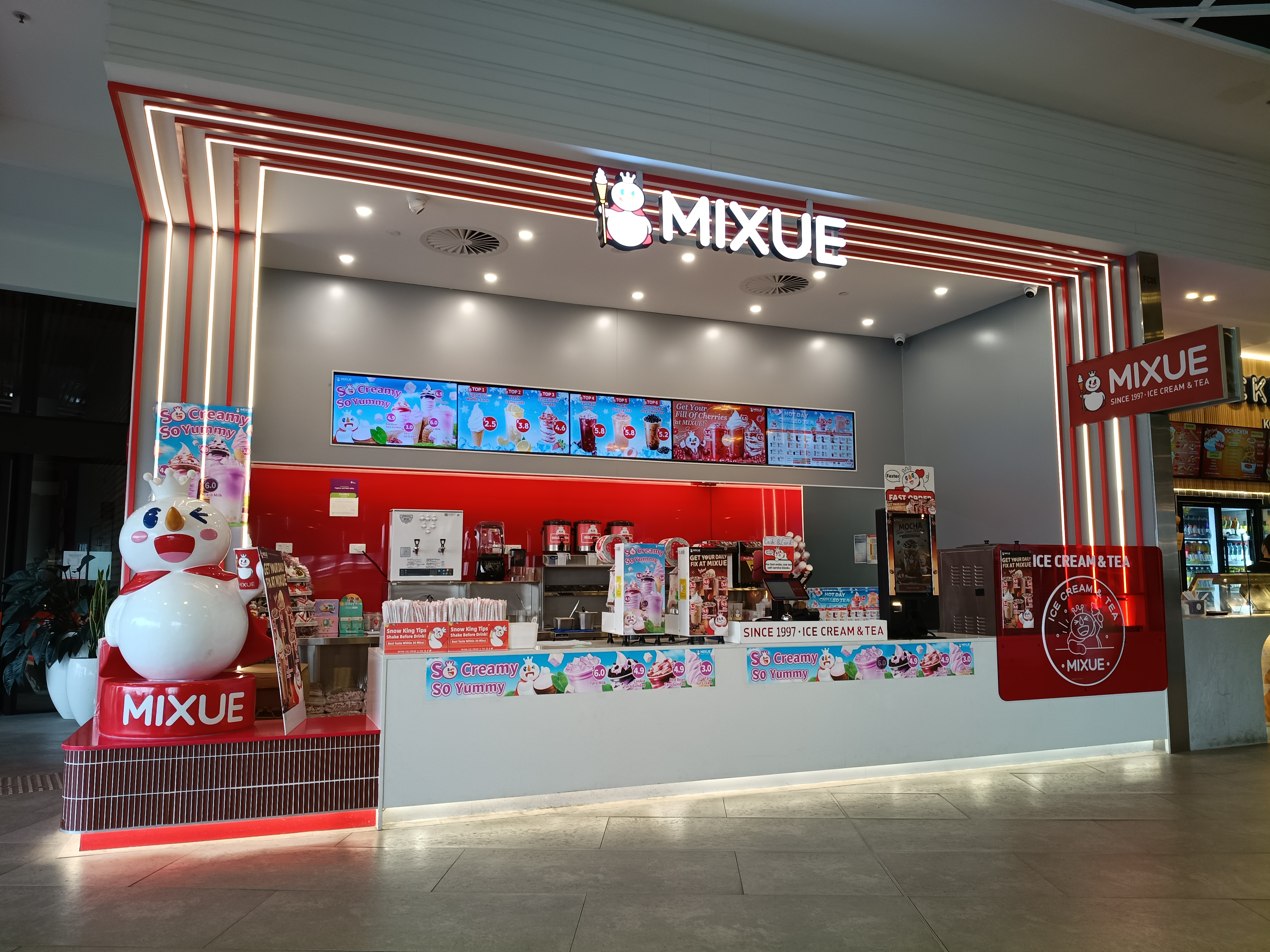
Exterior of a MIXUE Ice Cream & Tea store in Kotara, New South Wales, Australia

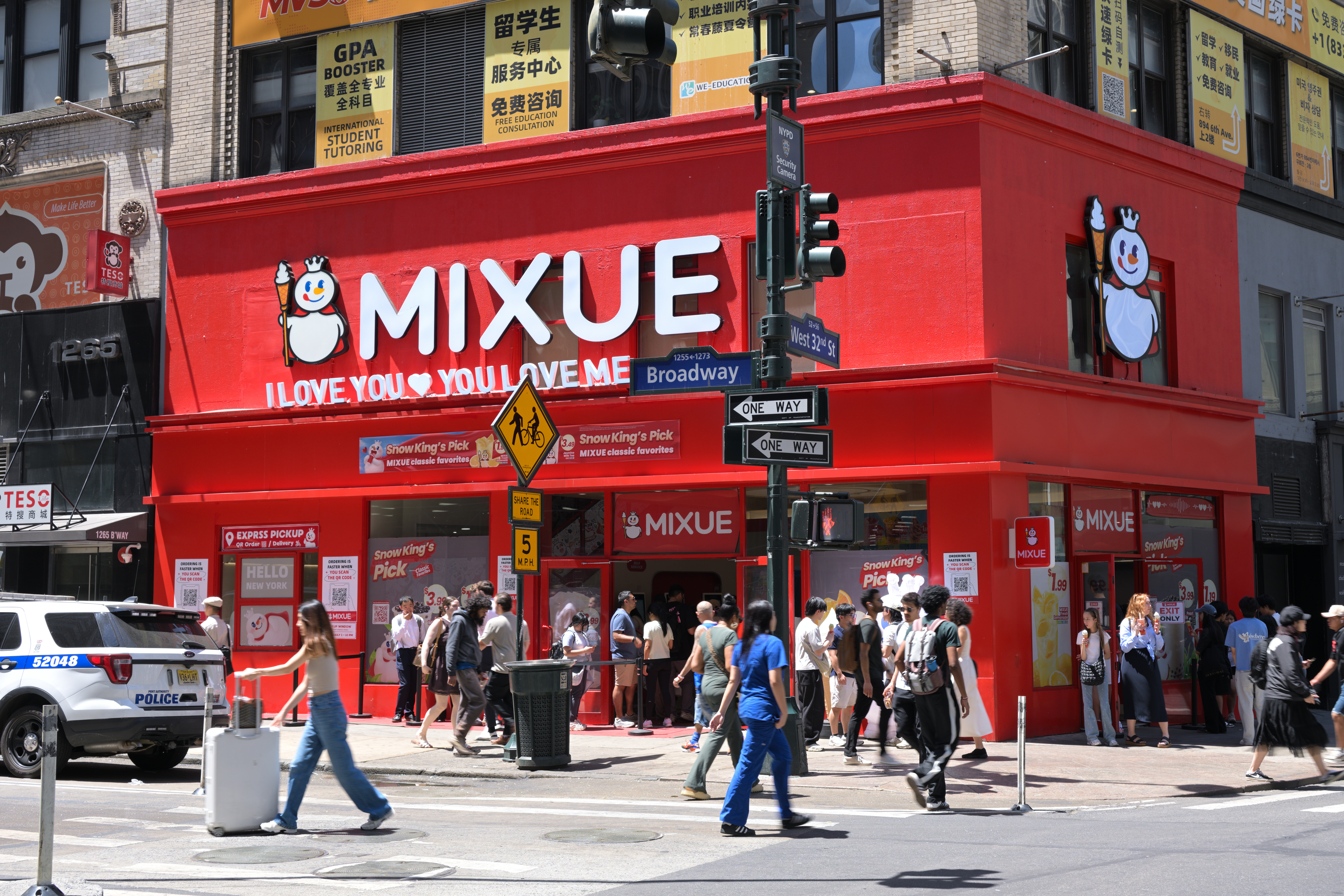
A Mixue store in New York City

In June 1997, Zhang Hongchao was studying at Henan University of Economics and Law when he opened a shaved‑ice stall in Zhengzhou using a CN¥3,000 loan from his grandmother. The stall's early success convinced him to expand, and in 1999 he opened a second stand called Mixue Bingcheng.

Due to a lack of experience, Hongchao had closed three stores in a little more than a year. Following the closure of his third store, he went to Hefei to sell tanghulu, which also failed. In spring 1999, Hongchao returned to Zhengzhou to start a new cold drink shop, though this would also be demolished; the failures of these street stalls were attributed to poor locations and ongoing urbanization.

=== Timeline ===
Mixue Ice Cream & Tea began in 1997 when Zhang Hongchao opened the first location under the Mixue name. After six relocations, the first successful Mixue Ice Cream & Tea store opened in 2003. Around 2005 or 2006, the company introduced soft serve ice cream at the price of just CN¥1, this quickly became a best-seller and its first signature product. In 2007, Mixue began franchising after opening a new ice cream shop. The following year, it established Mixue Ice Cream & Tea Trading Co., Ltd. to manage its growing network of franchises.

Mixue took its first step outside of China on September 5, 2018, with a store opening in Hanoi, Vietnam. Later that year, in November, it launched a new brand mascot, Snow King. Between May 24 and 26, 2019, the company hosted an "ice cream music festival" at Opalala Water Park in Zhengzhou, drawing over 30,000 visitors. On June 24, 2020, Mixue celebrated the opening of its 10,000th store in Yuanyang County, Henan, Xinxiang. The same year, it expanded into Indonesia with a branch in Cihampelas Walk, Bandung.

In 2022, Mixue made significant purchases of over 9,000 tonnes (8,900 long tons; 9,900 short tons) of tea, benefiting around 50,000 tea farmers, while also supporting over 11,000 franchisees and generating more than 500,000 jobs. It launched a CN¥6.5 million scholarship program across five universities in Henan and expanded into additional Southeast Asian markets, opening stores in Singapore, Thailand, Cambodia, Philippines, Laos, and Myanmar. By the end of 2022, Mixue had also entered South Korea and Japan. In February 2023, the company debuted in Australia with a store in Sydney, followed by additional openings in Melbourne and Brisbane. By the first nine months of 2023, Mixue had sold approximately 442 million ice cream cones in China.

On March 3, 2025, Mixue Group went public through an initial public offering on the Hong Kong Stock Exchange in what was then the city's largest initial public offering of the year. The company sold 17 million shares at HK$202.5 each, raising about HK$3.45 billion (US$444 million). In September 2025, Mixue began plans to open a store in the United States in New York City. On December 20, 2025, Mixue opened their first American store in Hollywood, Los Angeles, and two stores opened four days later in New York City, in Herald Square and the Hell's Kitchen neighborhood. Reviewers prominently noted the chain's low prices and that items were constantly sold out.

== See also ==
- List of companies of China
- List of ice cream brands
- List of ice cream parlor chains
