= Fuqing dialect =

Eastern Min dialect of Fuqing, China

Fuqing
- 福清話
- Hók-chiăng-uâ
- Native to: People's Republic of China, Malaysia
- Region: Fuqing; Pingtan; some parts of Changle; Yongtai; Fuzhou city proper; Sitiawan; Sri Jaya
- Language family: Sino-Tibetan: Sinitic; Chinese; Min; Coastal Min; Eastern Min; Houguan; Fuqing
- Early forms: Proto-Sino-Tibetan: Old Chinese (Note: Min is believed to have split from Old Chinese, rather than Middle Chinese like other varieties of Chinese.); Proto-Min
- Writing system: Chinese characters and Foochow Romanized

Language codes
- ISO 639-3: –
- ISO 639-6: fuji
- Glottolog: None
- Linguasphere: 79-AAA-icm

The Fuqing dialect (simplified Chinese: 福清话; traditional Chinese: 福清話; pinyin: Fúqīnghuà, BUC: Hók-chiăng-uâ, IPA: [huʔ˥ tsʰiaŋ˥ ŋuɑ˦˨]), or Hokchia, is an Eastern Min dialect. It is spoken in the county-level city of Fuqing, China, situated within the prefecture-level city of Fuzhou. It is not completely mutually intelligible with the Fuzhou dialect, although the level of understanding is high enough to be considered so.

== Phonology ==
The Fuqing dialect has fifteen initials, forty-six rimes, and seven tones.

=== Initials ===
Including the null initial, the Fuqing dialect has fifteen initials, excluding the phonemes [β] and [ʒ], which are only used in connected spoken speech.

Chart of Fuqing dialect initials
		Bilabial	Alveolar	Dental	Velar	Glottal
Nasal		m ⟨m, 蒙⟩		n ⟨n, 日⟩	ŋ ⟨ng, 語⟩	
Plosive	plain	p ⟨b, 邊⟩		t ⟨d, 低⟩	k ⟨g, 求⟩	ʔ ⟨鶯⟩
Plosive	aspirated	pʰ ⟨p, 波⟩		tʰ ⟨t, 他⟩	kʰ ⟨k, 氣⟩	
Affricate	plain			ts ⟨c, 曾⟩		
Affricate	aspirated			tsʰ ⟨ch, 出⟩		
Fricative		β ⟨dó̤h-buó, 桌布⟩	θ ⟨s, 時⟩	ʒ ⟨băh-cái, 白菜⟩		h ⟨h, 非/喜⟩
Approximant				l ⟨l, 柳⟩		

(The Chinese characters represent the sample characters taken from the Qī Lín Bāyīn (戚林八音, Foochow Romanized: Chék Lìng Báik-ĭng), while the Latin letters are from the orthography Foochow Romanized).

[θ] is a voiceless dental fricative, and is the mainstream pronunciation; some pronounce it as [s]. There is no phonemic contrast between the two.

[ts], [tsʰ] and [s] palatalize to [tɕ], [tɕʰ], [ɕ] before finals that begin with /y/, the close front rounded vowel (i.e. before the finals [y], [yo/yɔ], [yoŋ/yɔŋ], [yoʔ/yɔʔ]).

=== Rimes ===
Including the syllabic nasal consonant [ŋ̍], the Fuqing dialect has forty-six rimes in total. Apart from [ŋ̍] and [iau], all rimes have a close/open distinction.

Chart of Fuqing dialect rimes
	Simple vowels	Compound vowels	Nasal coda /-ŋ/	Glottal coda /-ʔ/
Null medial	[a/ɑ] 嘉 (a, ah)	[au/ɑu] 郊 (au)	[aŋ/ɑŋ] 山 (ang)	[aʔ/ɑʔ] 鴨 (ak)
Null medial		[ai/ɑi] 開 (ai)		
Null medial	[o/ɔ] 歌 (o̤, o̤h)	[oi/ɔi] 催 (oi/o̤i)	[oŋ/ɔŋ] 釭 (ong/aung)	[oʔ/ɔʔ] 樂 (ok/auk)
Null medial	[ɛ/æ] 西 (a̤)	[eu/ɛu] 溝 (eu)	[ɛŋ/æŋ] 燈 (eng/aing)	[ɛʔ/æʔ] 客 (ek/aik)
Null medial	[ø/œ] 初 (e̤/ae̤)		[øŋ/œŋ] 東 (e̤ng/ae̤ng)	[øʔ/œʔ] 角 (e̤k/ae̤k)
Null medial			[ŋ̍] 伓 (ng)	
Medial /i/	[ia/iɑ] 奇 (ia, iah)	[iau] -- (--)	[iaŋ/iɑŋ] 聲 (iang)	[iaʔ/iɑʔ] 察 (iak)
Medial /i/	[i/e] 之 (i/e, ih/eh)	[iu/ieu] 秋 (iu/eu)	[iŋ/eŋ] 賓 (ing/eng)	[iʔ/eʔ] 力 (ik/ek)
Medial /i/	[ie/iɛ] 雞 (ie)	[ieu/iɐu] 燒 (ieu)	[ieŋ/iɛŋ] 天 (ieng)	[ieʔ/iɛʔ] 熱 (iek)
Medial /u/	[u/o] 孤 (u/o)	[ui/uoi] 輝 (ui/oi)	[uŋ/oŋ] 春 (ung/ong)	[uʔ/oʔ] 福 (uk/ok)
Medial /u/	[ua/uɑ] 花 (ua, uah)		[uaŋ/uɑŋ] 歡 (uang)	[uaʔ/uɑʔ] 法 (uak)
Medial /u/	[uo/uɔ] 過 (uo, uoh)	[uoi/uɐi] 杯 (uoi)	[uoŋ/uɔŋ] 光 (uong)	[uoʔ/uɔʔ] 月 (uok)
Medial /y/	[y/ø] 須 (ṳ/e̤ṳ)		[yŋ/øŋ] 銀 (ṳng/e̤ṳng)	[yʔ/øʔ] 肉 (ṳk/e̤ṳk)
Medial /y/	[yo/yɔ] 橋 (io, ioh)		[yoŋ/yɔŋ] 香 (iong)	[yoʔ/yɔʔ] 藥 (iok)

The rime before the slash is the close or tense rime (simplified Chinese: 窄韵; traditional Chinese: 窄韻; pinyin: zhǎiyùn, or alternatively in simplified Chinese: 紧韵; traditional Chinese: 緊韻; pinyin: jǐnyùn), while the rime after the slash is the open or lax rime (simplified Chinese: 宽韵; traditional Chinese: 寬韻; pinyin: kuānyùn; or otherwise named in simplified Chinese: 松韵; traditional Chinese: 鬆韻; pinyin: sōngyùn). The Chinese characters represent the sample characters taken from the Qī Lín Bāyīn (戚林八音, Foochow Romanized: Chék Lìng Báik-ĭng), with further characters from rimes with glottal codas. The Latin letters are from the orthography Foochow Romanized.

The rime [iau] only has one syllable [ŋiau], and is not found in the Qī Lín Bāyīn; furthermore, Foochow Romanized does not have a way to represent this syllable.

In the modern Rongcheng dialect, the rime [iu/ieu] has now merged into [ieu/iɐu] and is no longer distinguished. Also in the new Rongcheng dialect, the rime [ui/uoi] has merged into [uoi/uɐi]. The syllabic nasal [ŋ̍] in the modern Rongcheng dialect is read as [iŋ]; some sources have not yet listed this final in their charts.

=== Tones ===
The Fuqing dialect has seven tones, with the Middle Chinese four tone categories of level/even (平), departing (去) and entering (入) all divided into dark (陰) and light (陽) categories. The names and the sequence of the seven tones are outlined below, as listed in the traditional rime dictionary Qī Lín Bāyīn:

Traditional nomenclature	Upper level 上平	Rising tone 上聲	Upper departing 上去	Upper entering 上入	Lower level 下平	Lower departing 下去	Lower entering 下入
Standard nomenclature	Dark level 陰平; Ĭng-bìng	Rising tone 上聲; Siōng-siăng	Dark departing 陰去; Ĭng-ké̤ṳ	Dark entering 陰入; Ĭng-ĭk	Light level 陽平; Iòng-bìng	Light departing 陽去; Iòng-ké̤ṳ	Light entering 陽入; Iòng-ĭk
IPA pitches	˥˧ (53)	˧˨ (32)	˨˩ (21)	ʔ˩˨ (12ʔ)	˥ (55)	˦˨ (42)	ʔ˥ (5ʔ)
Foochow Romanized (with a as example)	ă	ā	á	ák	à	â	ăk

The dark level (陰平 Ĭng-bìng) tone falls the most sharply; the light departing (陽去 Iòng-ké̤ṳ) tone is a mid falling tone, whose fall in pitch is not as dramatic.

In tone sandhi, a new tone contour, one that rises (˧˥, 35) is produced from certain interactions of tone categories in the "New" Rongcheng dialect.

Additionally, the Fuqing dialect contains the neutral tone in colloquial speech, which generally manifests as a mid tone.

=== Close-open rimes ===
The phenomenon of close and open rime alternation (also known as tense and lax rimes; in Chinese, variously 寬窄韻現象; kuānzhǎiyùn xiànxiàng; 鬆、緊韻現象; sōng, jǐn yùn xiànxiàng; or 本韻、變韻現象; běnyùn, biànyùn xiànxiàng) is found throughout the dialects of cities and villages in the traditional Fuzhou area (the ten towns of Fuzhou, 福州十邑). But it is absent from, for example, the dialects of Gutian (古田) and Luoyuan (羅源). The dialect of Fuqing, along with that of the urban area of Fuzhou, exhibits this phenomenon.

According to the original listing of the rimes in the Qī Lín Bāyīn, the medial vowel did not change with the tones. But in the Fuqing dialect, when the rime is in either one of the departing tones or in the dark entering tone, the medial vowel changes to another, the rime being called the open rime. When in either of the two level tones, in the rising tone, or in the light entering tone, the rime does not change; this rime is called the close rime. In the Fuqing dialect, with the exception of [ŋ] and [iau], all rimes exhibit this close-open alternation.

As an example, the rime from "春" in the Qī Lín Bāyīn, lists the two rimes: [uŋ] and [uk]. In the Gutian dialect, the same vowel is preserved in the rime [u], regardless of tone. But in the Fuqing dialect, the rime [uŋ] in the dark departing (陰去) and light departing (陽去) tones changes to [oŋ], where the vowel in the final [u] has become [o]. Similarly, [uʔ] in the upper departing (上入) tone becomes the open rime [oʔ], where the vowel has again changed.

Tone name	Dark level 陰平	Rising tone 上聲	Dark departing 陰去	Dark entering 陰入	Light level 陽平	Light departing 陽去	Light entering 陽入
Chinese character	東	董	噸	督	同	燉	獨
Fuqing dialect	[tuŋ]	[tuŋ]	[toŋ]	[toʔ]	[tuŋ]	[toŋ]	[tuʔ]
Gutian dialect	[tuŋ]	[tuŋ]	[tuŋ]	[tuk]	[tuŋ]	[tuŋ]	[tuk]

Within the Fuqing dialect, the vowel of the open rime is always more open (or lower) by a degree than the close rime. For example, 知 in the dark level tone 陰平 is read [ti] as a close rime, with the close vowel [i]. Listed as the same rime but in a different tone (i.e. light departing 陽去) is 地, which is instead read as [te], an open rime with the half-close vowel [e], one degree more open than [i]. All close rimes in the relevant tone categories have become their corresponding open rimes according to this rule.

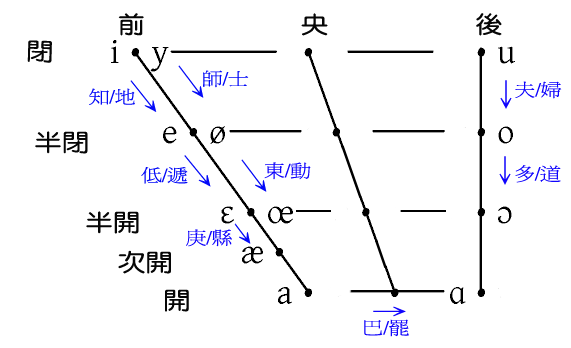
Illustration of the phonetics of the close-open alternation

Close rime	Open rime
師 [θy]	士 [θø]
低 [te]	遞 [tɛ]
東 [tøŋ]	動 [tœŋ]
庚 [kɛŋ]	縣 [kæŋ]
夫 [hu]	婦 [ho]
多 [to]	道 [tɔ]
巴 [pa]	罷 [pɑ]

Synchronically, this alternation can affect vowels when tone sandhi occurs; please see the section on rime changes.

== Sound changes ==
The Fuqing dialect has a particularly rich set of phonetic changes. The pronunciation of a particular Chinese character under certain circumstances can undergo changes in its initial, its rime, and its tone. For example, the word 兄弟哥 (brother, Standard Mandarin: 兄弟) is made of the three words 兄 /hiaŋ˥˧/, 弟 /tiɛ˦˨/ and 哥 /ko˥˧/, but is actually pronounced as 兄弟哥 /hiaŋ˥ nie˥ o˥˧/. Within this word, the first syllable 兄 has undergone tone sandhi and has thus changed tone; the last syllable 哥 has lost its initial consonant; and the rime of the middle syllable 弟 has changed in both vowel and tone. Within lexical or semantic items, the three features of initial, rime and tone are subject to sandhi phenomena. In colloquial Fuqing speech, this type of change is very frequently encountered, but is rare in Chinese as a whole.

=== Initial assimilation ===
In colloquial Fuqing speech, the initial consonants of Chinese characters or syllables are subject to change under specific circumstances within lexical items. The first modern work to examine the phonology of the Fuzhou dialect, the Mǐnyīn Yánjiū (閩音研究), used the term "initial assimilation" (in simplified Chinese: 声母类化; traditional Chinese: 聲母類化; pinyin: shēngmǔ lèihuà) to refer to this phenomenon. The Fuqing dialect contains two voiced initial consonants, /β/ and /ʒ/, that only appear through initial assimilation.

Initial assimilation in the Fuqing dialect occurs in polysyllabic lexemes (i.e. lexical items or words of two or more syllables or Chinese characters) and certain semantic groups. Usually within these groups, all syllables apart from the first undergo initial assimilation. But if the initial of the following syllable is a nasal or /l/, then the initial assimilation does not occur at that point. Not every phrase will undergo initial assimilation, and the ones that do may differ from their counterparts in the other Min Dong varieties.

The syllable that undergoes initial assimilation is the "latter character"; that which precedes it is the "former character". Initial assimilation in the Fuqing dialect consists of three types: voicing, nasalisation/nasal assimilation and suppression. The rime of the former character determines the type of assimilation of the latter character's initial.

Former character's rime type	Latter character's initial type	Example
"Checked rime" / Rime ending in a glottal stop	No change	/hoʔ tsʰiaŋ/ > [huʔ tsʰiaŋ] (福清, Fuqing)
Yang rime / Rime ending in a nasal	Nasalisation / Nasal assimilation	/hiaŋ tiɛ/ > [hiaŋ niɛ] (兄弟, brother)
Yin rime / Rime ending in a vowel	Voicing or suppression	/θɛ pœʔ/ > [θɛ βœʔ] (西北, northwest) /ŋo kæŋ/ > [ŋu æŋ] (五縣, five counties)

Which voiced consonant or nasal consonant or whether the consonant is suppressed depends on the place of articulation of the latter syllable's initial.

Initial's place of articulation	Initial	Example character	Nasalisation / Nasal assimilation	Voicing	Suppression
Labial	/p, pʰ/	臂 [piɛ]	[kieŋ miɛ] (肩臂)	[tsʰiu βiɛ] (手臂)	--
Velar	/k, kʰ, h, ʔ/	學 [hoʔ]	[θoŋ ŋoʔ] (算學)	--	[θu oʔ] (數學)
Dental (Type A)	/t, tʰ, θ/	頭 [tʰau]	[tsieŋ nau] (枕頭)	[ŋia lau] (額頭)	--
Dental (Type B)	/ts, tsʰ/	蔗 [tsiɑ]	[kaŋ niɑ] (甘蔗)	[huʔ tsiu ʒiɑ] (福州蔗)	--

Type A dentals after voicing assimilation do not become the standard [l], but are slightly flapped.

=== Tone sandhi ===
As with the majority of southern varieties of Chinese, the Fuqing dialect exhibits tone sandhi. The phenomenon of tone sandhi in the Fuqing dialect contains a whole set of rules to be followed, but it is still rather complex: one tone can undergo different changes depending on what tone follows it. For example, the light entering (陽入) tone in front of the dark departing (陰去) tone becomes ˩ (11), but in front of a rising tone (上聲) it becomes ˥ (55); and in front of the dark entering (陰入) tone it becomes ˨˩ (21).

Chart of tone sandhi with 實, a syllable in the light entering tone (陽入調)
Original syllable (IPA)	Tone of the following syllable	Tone value after sandhi	Example word
/θiʔ˥/	Dark departing 陰去	˩ (11)	[θiʔ˩ tsiɛ˨˩] (實際)
/θiʔ˥/	Rising tone 上聲	˥ (55)	[θiʔ˥ tsieŋ˧˨] (實踐)
/θiʔ˥/	Dark entering 陰入	˨˩ (21)	[θiʔ˨˩ tseʔ˩˨] (實質)

In many local dialects of the Fuzhou area (within the Eastern Min family), the last syllable of a word does not undergo tone sandhi. However, in the Fuqing dialect, the last syllable's tone does change under certain circumstances.

First Character and Pronunciation	Last Character and Pronunciation	Pronunciation in Sandhi
小 /θieu˧˨/	禮 /lɛ˧˨/	小禮 /θieu˨ lɛ˥/
綠 /luo˥˧/	色 /θæʔ˩˨/	綠色 /luo˨˩ θæʔ˨/

Below is a full table for the tone sandhi on two syllable domains for the main "new" Rongcheng pronunciation of the Fuqing dialect:

"New" Rongcheng Fuqing dialect: Two-character Tone Sandhi
	Tone of latter syllable						
	Ĭng-bìng (陰平) ˥˧ (53)	Siōng-siăng (上聲) ˧˨ (32)	Ĭng-ké̤ṳ (陰去) ˨˩ (21)	Ĭng-ĭk (陰入) ʔ˩˨ (12ʔ)	Iòng-bìng (陽平) ˥ (55)	Iòng-ké̤ṳ (陽去) ˦˨ (42)	Iòng-ĭk (陽入) ʔ˥ (5ʔ)
Ĭng-bìng (陰平) ˥˧ (53)	˥˧ ˥˧	˥˧ ˧˨	˧˥ ˨˩	˧˥ ʔ˩˨	˥˧ ˥	˧˥ ˦˨	˥ ʔ˥
Siōng-siăng (上聲) ˧˨ (32)	˨˩ ˥˧	˨˩ ˥˧	˧˥ ˨˩	˧˥ ʔ˩˨	˨˩ ˧˥	˧˥ ˦˨	˨˩ ʔ˥
Ĭng-ké̤ṳ (陰去) ˨˩ (21)	˥ ˥˧	˥˧ ˧˨	˥˧ ˨˩	˥˧ ʔ˩˨	˥ ˥	˥˧ ˦˨	˥ ʔ˥
Ĭng-ĭk (陰入) ʔ˩˨ (12ʔ)	ʔ˥ ˥˧	ʔ˥ ˧˨	ʔ˥ ˨˩	ʔ˥ ʔ˩˨	ʔ˥ ˥	ʔ˥ ˦˨	ʔ˥ ʔ˥
Iòng-bìng (陽平) ˥ (55)	˥ ˥˧	˥ ˧˨	˨˩ ˨˩	˨˩ ʔ˩˨	˥ ˥	˥ ˦˨	˥ ʔ˥
Iòng-ké̤ṳ (陽去) ˦˨ (42)	˥ ˥˧	˥ ˧˨	˨˩ ˨˩	˨˩ ʔ˩˨	˥ ˥	˥ ˦˨	˥ ʔ˥
Iòng-ĭk (陽入) ʔ˥ (ʔ5)	ʔ˥ ˥˧	ʔ˥ ˧˨	ʔ˨˩ ˨˩	ʔ˨˩ ʔ˩˨	ʔ˥ ˥	ʔ˥ ˦˨	ʔ˥ ʔ˥

Aside from words composed of two syllables (or binomes), those composed of three syllables also undergo tone sandhi.

First Character	Second Character	Third Character	Pronunciation in Sandhi
福 /hoʔ˩˨/	清 /tsʰiaŋ˥˧/	話 /uɑ˦˨/	福清話 /huʔ˥ tsʰiaŋ˥ ŋuɑ˦˨/

=== Rime changes ===
Within polysyllabic words (of two or more syllables) or characters within one sense unit, if in the departing tone (both light departing and dark departing) or in the dark entering tone, and if it is not the last character in the unit, the rime undergoes tensing. This rime change is related to the open/close rime phenomenon: as these three tones only have open rimes, when the character changes tone through tone sandhi, the open rimes will become the corresponding close rimes.

	First character	Middle character	Final character	Pronunciation as a single phrase
Fuqing dialect	/hoʔ/ (福)	/tsʰiaŋ/ (清)	/kæŋ/ (縣)	/huʔ tsʰiaŋ ŋæŋ/ (福清縣)
Gutian dialect	/huk/ (福)	/tsʰiaŋ/ (清)	/keiŋ/ (縣)	/huk tsʰiaŋ ŋeiŋ/ (福清縣)

The /tsʰiaŋ˥˧/ 清 is light level tone and has a close rime, so although it is in a non-final position within the group, its rime does not change. On the other hand, /hoʔ˩˨/ 福 is light entering tone, while /keiŋ˦˨/ 縣 is dark departing tone; both characters hence have open rimes. As 福 is in a non-final position in its group, its rime changes; 縣 is the last syllable and so resists the change.

== Internal variation ==
The Fuqing dialect is divided into several branches, based on their phonology:

- The Rongcheng branch (Chinese: 融城片; pinyin: Róngchéng piàn) includes an area covering the city center, as well as the towns of Dongzhang (東張鎮), Jingyang (鏡洋鎮), Yuxi (漁溪鎮), Shangjing (上逕鎮), Haikou (海口鎮), Chengtou (城頭鎮), Nanling (南嶺鎮), Longtian (龍田鎮), Jiangjing (江鏡鎮) and parts of Xincuo (新厝鎮). The features of this branch include the following:
  - merger of the [iu] 秋 and [ieu] 燒 finals;
  - the original area of Rongcheng Town (融城鎮) had a split between old and new, where several finals have merged;
  - the tone sandhi system of the new Rongcheng dialect has converged with that of surrounding areas.
- The Gaoshan branch (Chinese: 高山片; pinyin: Gāoshān piàn) covers the towns of Gangtou (港頭鎮), Sanshan (三山鎮), Shapu (沙埔鎮), Gaoshan (高山鎮) and Donghan (東瀚鎮). It is characterized by:
  - relatively non-noticeable rime tensing;
  - a clear distinction of the [iu] 秋 and [ieu] 燒 finals.
- The Jiangyin branch (simplified Chinese: 江阴片; traditional Chinese: 江陰片; pinyin: Jiāngyīn piàn) just includes Jinyin Town. It is characterized by:
  - some words with voiced initials in entering tones retain the final glottal stop whereas the other branches have lost that glottal stop. For example Chinese: 藥 medicine is read as [yoʔ˥] in Jinyin as opposed to [yo˥˧] as in Rongcheng.
  - there is a reported phonemic difference in vowel length in certain words with glottal stops, e.g. Chinese: 藥 medicine has a long vowel, whereas Chinese: 閱 examine, read has a short vowel, although both are read [yoʔ˥].
- The Yidu branch (Chinese: 一都片; pinyin: Yīdū piàn), comprising Yidu Town. It is geographically close to Yongtai County, and features which are closer to the Fuzhou dialect. Some of these are:
  - final glottal stops are retained from Middle Chinese final obstruent stops, as in the Fuzhou dialect;
  - it has the triphthong [uoi] where Rongcheng would have a diphthong [ua];
  - there are more diphthongs where Rongcheng would have monophthongs, e.g. Yidu [ou] for Rongcheng [o].

There is a high degree of mutual intelligibility between the three branches despite their differences, and the original Rongcheng dialect, spoken in an area now part of Yuping Road (Chinese: 玉屏街道; pinyin: Yùpíng Jiēdào), is well understood across the whole Fuqing region.

== Historical evolution ==
The Fuqing dialect has lost the voiced obstruents from Middle Chinese, has merged the final nasal consonants into one phoneme and similarly for the entering tone final stop consonant. But it has also preserved many readings from Middle Chinese: its pattern of entering tone readings greatly matches that of Middle Chinese, apart from the colloquial layer of character readings which has lost them.

=== Overview ===
==== Initials ====
Old and Middle Chinese had a large array of voiced consonants, which are preserved in the Wu group of Chinese varieties, e.g. in the Suzhou dialect. But the Fuqing dialect has devoiced the obstruents, turning them into voiceless consonants, just as other Eastern Min varieties of Chinese have.

Comparison of Voiced Initials
Character	朋	豆	近	絕	紅	解
Suzhou dialect	/bã/	/dɤ/	/dʑin/	/ziəʔ/	/ɦoŋ/	/ɡɑ/
Fuqing dialect	/pɛŋ/	/tɑu/	/køŋ/	/tsuoʔ/	/huŋ/	/kɛ/

The Fuqing dialect does have two voiced obstruent phonemes, /β/ and /ʒ/, but these appear in connected speech, and are not considered part of the initials.

The 疑 initial of Middle Chinese, reconstructed as the velar nasal /ŋ/, has not been preserved by many modern varieties of Chinese. In standard Mandarin, the initial /ŋ/ has been completely lost, with some having merged into the initial /n/ (e.g. 牛, 虐, 擬). In Wu, Yue and Hakka, the /ŋ/ initial with front vowels /i/ and /y/ have either been lost (hence merging into the 影 initial) or become another initial. But in the Fuqing dialect, the 疑 initial is preserved as /ŋ/ in front of front and back vowels alike, with a few exceptions having merged into /m/. In some Mandarin varieties as well as Yue, a /ŋ/ sound is added to the beginning of back vowels of the null initial class 影 (e.g. pronouncing 安 as /ŋan/), but in the Fuqing dialect the 影 initial always remains null.

Comparison of Historical 疑 Initials
Character	牙	礙	餓	嶽	我	誤	疑	逆	魚	虐	銀	瓦
Fuqing dialect	/ŋa/	/ŋɑi/	/ŋɔ/	/ŋoʔ/	/ŋua/	/ŋuɔ/	/ŋi/	/ŋiʔ/	/ŋy/	/ŋyoʔ/	/ŋyŋ/	/muɑ/
Cantonese	/ŋa/	/ŋɔi/	/ŋɔ/	/ŋɔk/	/ŋɔ/	/ŋ̍/	/ji/	/jɪk/	/jy/	/jœk/	/ŋɐn/	/ŋa/

The Late Middle Chinese 非 initial is pronounced in the Fuqing dialect not with /f/ but with /p/, /pʰ/ or /h/. This lack of labiodental consonants is common to all of the Min varieties as well as Sino-Korean. For example, 發 is read as /puɔʔ/, 蜂 is read as /pʰuŋ/, while 非 is read as /hi/.

A group in Middle Chinese with the initial 知 is pronounced with alveolar stops /t/ or /tʰ/, and not with retroflex or palatal affricates, for example, 知 as /ti/, 竹 as /tøʔ/, 重 as /tʰyŋ/. This feature is also common to most of Min, implying that it has conserved this feature from Old Chinese.

==== Codas ====
The three nasal codas of Middle Chinese have become one velar nasal [ŋ] in the Fuqing dialect. The three entering tone voiceless stop codas also all became a velar stop [k], which has weakened to a glottal stop [ʔ].

Comparison of Final Consonants
Historical Final Consonant	/m/	/n/	/ŋ/	/p/	/t/	/k/
Example Character	南	電	驚	帖	雪	腹
Ningde dialect	/nam/	/tiŋ/	/kiaŋ/	/tʰɛp/	/suk/	/pok/
Zhouning dialect	/nan/	/tin/	/kiɛŋ/	/tʰɛk/	/θut/	/pok/
Fuqing dialect	/naŋ/	/tiɛŋ/	/kiaŋ/	/tʰæʔ/	/θuɔʔ/	/poʔ/

==== Tones ====
The Fuqing dialect possesses just one tone derived from the historical rising tone (上聲) of Middle Chinese, corresponding to the dark rising tone where those with historical voiceless initials have remained. Those with historical voiced obstruents in the former light rising tone have merged with the light departing tone. Those with historical sonorants underwent a split: in colloquial readings they grouped with light departing tone, whereas in literary readings these joined the dark rising tone.

Comparison of Outcomes of the Historical Rising Tone (上聲)
Historical Initial Consonant Type	Voiceless (清)	Voiced Obstruent (全濁)		Voiced Sonorant (次濁)			
Example Character	考	市	上	老	雨	有	馬
Fuqing dialect	/kʰo˧˨/	/tsʰe˦˨/	/θyoŋ˦˨/	coll. /lɑu˦˨/ lit. /lo˧˨/	coll. /huɔ˦˨/ lit. /y˧˨/	coll. /ou˦˨/ lit. /iu˧˨/	only lit. /ma˧˨/

There is also an innovation in entering tone characters. Where in the rime book Qī Lín Bāyīn (戚林八音), an entering tone character begins with an unvoiced consonant (e.g. the initials 花, 嘉, 歌, 之, 過, 橋, 奇), in the colloquial reading these lose their final glottal stop. Thus, the tones merge into their phonetically closest non-checked equivalent: dark entering merges into dark departing, and light entering merges into the dark level tone. In the Fuzhou dialect these preserve their identity as entering tone in the colloquial reading. Nevertheless, in literary reading, these characters retain their glottal stop as a marker of the entering tone in Fuqing as well as in Fuzhou.

Comparison of Outcomes of Glottal Stop Loss
Historical Tone	Dark entering (陰入)			Light entering (陽入)			
Character	隔	索	曲	石	糴	畫	挃
Fuzhou dialect (colloquial reading)	kɑʔ˨˦	sɔʔ˨˦	kʰuɔʔ˨˦	suoʔ˥	tieʔ˥	uaʔ˥	tiʔ˥
Fuqing dialect (colloquial reading)	kɑ˨˩	θɔ˨˩	kʰuɔ˨˩	θyo˥˧	tia˥˧	ua˥˧	ti˥˧

=== Literary and colloquial readings ===
The Fuqing dialect exhibits a split between literary and colloquial readings. Initials, rimes and tones may be affected independently of each other, yielding a total of seven possible outcomes:

- Difference in initials: 富 ([po˨˩] / [ho˨˩])
- Difference in rimes: 清 ([tsʰiaŋ˥˧] / [tsʰiŋ˥˧])
- Difference in tones: 利 ([le˨˩] / [le˦˨])
- Difference in initial and rime: 夫 ([puo˥˧] / [hu˥˧])
- Difference in initial and tone: 遠 ([huɔŋ˦˨] / [uoŋ˧˨])
- Difference in rime and tone: 兩 ([lɑŋ˦˨] / [lyoŋ˧˨])
- Difference in initial, rime and tone: 網 ([mœŋ˦˨] / [uoŋ˧˨])

When there is a difference between literary and colloquial readings, the colloquial one is used in vernacular speech, common surnames and place names of the Greater Fuzhou area, whilst the literary reading is generally used in more literary compound words, in given names, and place names outside the local area. For example, the common verb 聽 listen has the colloquial reading [tʰiaŋ˥˧], whereas the historical noun 聽差 manservant / office attendant, which has the same lexeme, uses the literary reading [tʰiŋ˥˧] (realized after sandhi as [tʰin˥ ne˥˧]). The 清 in the names of Minqing 閩清 and Fuqing 福清 are pronounced [tsʰiaŋ˥˧], though the name of Qingliu County 清流縣, being outside the Fuzhou area, uses the literary pronunciation [tsʰiŋ˥˧].

Literary pronunciations are also used in poetry, with some readings specifically used only in this context; additionally, neologisms generally use literary pronunciation. Thus a more recent compound such as 外國 foreign uses the literary reading for 外 outside, [ŋuoi˦˨], whereas an older compound 外公 maternal grandfather uses the vernacular reading [ŋia˦˨]. It is possible to have more than one literary or more than one vernacular reading; for example the verb 拖 drag, haul has the literary reading [tʰo˥˧], and two vernacular readings [tʰua˥˧] and [tʰai˥˧] used in separate compound words.

== Vocabulary ==
Fuqing has had a long history of migration, with which has come a large number of different sources of vocabulary, creating several layers or lexical strata. One of the layers that the Fuqing dialect has is the Minyue language, which today remains as a source of colloquial vocabulary. Despite their common use, these vocabulary items often cannot be traced back to a Chinese root character.

Vocabulary derived from Old Chinese can be classified into two types. The first comes from migrants from the Three Kingdoms period, when people of the Eastern Wu migrated to Fujian, bringing the varieties of Wu and Chu. This layer is already extinct in the Chinese varieties spoken in the homelands of the Wu and Chu regions, but it is still found across the Min varieties of Fujian. The second type derives from the Northern and Southern Dynasties. Such vocabulary is in general the basis of the colloquial readings.

The lexical stratum from Middle Chinese derives from the Chinese spoken in the Tang dynasty, with some later additions from the Song dynasty, forming the principal literary layer.

Origin of lexical items
Layer	Origin	Fuqing		Meaning		Notes
Layer	Origin	IPA	Chinese characters	English	Standard Chinese	Notes
Minyue 閩越底層	Old Yue language 古越語	/ŋɔŋ˦˨/	戇 or 歞	stupid	傻	Compare Wuming Zhuang /ŋɔŋ/
Minyue 閩越底層	Old Yue language 古越語	/loʔ˩˨/	--	to fall, decline	脫落	Compare Wuming Zhuang /lo:t/
Minyue 閩越底層	Old Yue language 古越語	/piŋ˧˨/	箳	a wicker board for a bed	竹箳 竹編床板	Compare Wuming Zhuang /pin/
Old Chinese 上古漢語	Old Wu 古吳語	/pʰieu˥˧/	薸	duckweed	浮萍	《揚子．方言》江東謂浮萍為薸。 Attested in the Fangyan for the Jiangdong region.
Old Chinese 上古漢語	Old Wu 古吳語	/uoŋ˧˨/	䘼	sleeve	袖子	《集韻》委遠切，音宛。《玉篇》襪也。又《方言．郭註》江東呼衣褾曰䘼。 Attested in the Fangyan for the Jiangdong region, as well as in the Yupian and the Jiyun.
Old Chinese 上古漢語	Old Wu 古吳語	/kie˦/	鮭	salted fish	鹽醃製的小魚	《集韻》戸佳切……，吳人謂魚菜總稱。 Attested in the Jiyun for the people in the region of Wu.
Old Chinese 上古漢語	Old Chu 古楚語	/θyo˥˧/	蜀	one (used only in counting)	數詞「一」	《方言》（揚雄所著），卷十二：一，蜀也，南楚謂之蜀。 Attested in the Fangyan for the Southern Chu region.
Old Chinese 上古漢語	Old Chu 古楚語	/tsʰeŋ˨˩/	㵾 or 凊	cold	冷	《說文》冷寒也。楚人謂冷曰㵾。 Attested in the Shuowen Jiezi for Chu.
Old Chinese 上古漢語	Old Chu 古楚語	/tsʰa˥˧/	瘥	to recover (from illness)	病情好轉	《玉篇》疾愈也。《方言》，卷三：南楚病癒者謂之差。（後作「瘥」） Attested in the Yupian for Chu and the Fangyan for Southern Chu.
Old Chinese 上古漢語	Central Plains Chinese 中原漢語	/tiaŋ˧˨/	鼎	wok/pan	鍋	
Old Chinese 上古漢語	Central Plains Chinese 中原漢語	/toŋ˥˧/	湯	boiled water	熱水	
Old Chinese 上古漢語	Central Plains Chinese 中原漢語	/tsʰuoi˨˩/	喙	mouth	嘴	
Old Chinese 上古漢語	Central Plains Chinese 中原漢語	/sɔ˨˩/	欶	to suck	吮吸	
Middle Chinese 中古漢語	Central Plains Chinese 中原漢語	/tyo˥˧/	著	at, in	在	
Middle Chinese 中古漢語	Central Plains Chinese 中原漢語	/ko˨˩/	故	still, -ing	還、尚	
Middle Chinese 中古漢語	Central Plains Chinese 中原漢語	/tɑu˨˩/	鬥	to compete, vie	競相	

Modern Standard Mandarin Chinese has also been source of vocabulary, via neologisms or formal compounds. Some such words are replaced by coinages from local roots, e.g. bicycle, which in the Fuqing dialect is 跤踏車 (also written 骹踏車) instead of being directly cognate to the standard Taiwanese Mandarin 腳踏車, literally foot-tread-vehicle, with the morpheme for foot being substituted by its local equivalent.

With contact with foreign countries, there have also been loanwords from non-Chinese languages, such as 加蘇林 for gasoline/petroleum, which in standard Mandarin would be 石油. Additionally, some loanwords have been adapted differently than in standard Mandarin; e.g. 馬臘加 Malacca, which is 馬六甲 in Mandarin.

In more modern times, the rise of new technologies, products and concepts has produced more direct loans from standard Mandarin, which may be used despite those sounds being rare in Fuqing dialect or even if there are Fuqing roots that could have been used. For example, a "night school" is 夜校, derived from standard Mandarin, and not *暝晡校 or *暝晡堂 as might have been expected from native Fuqing dialect roots.
