= Matsu dialect =

Eastern Min dialect of Taiwan

- 馬祖話 / Mā-cū-huâ 平話 / Bàng-huâ
- Pronunciation: [mɑ˧˩ tsu˥ uɑ˩˧˩] / [paŋ˧˩ ŋuɑ˩˧˩]
- Native to: Taiwan
- Region: Matsu Islands
- Ethnicity: Fuzhounese
- Language family: Sino-Tibetan: Sinitic; Chinese; Min; Coastal Min; Eastern Min; Houguan; Fuzhou; Matsu dialect
- Early forms: Proto-Sino-Tibetan: Old Chinese (Note: Min is believed to have split from Old Chinese, rather than Middle Chinese like other varieties of Chinese.); Proto-Min
- Writing system: Chinese characters, Foochow Romanized and Matsu Fuzhounese Bopomofo

Official status
- Official language in: Matsu Islands, Taiwan (as local language)
- Recognised minority language in: One of the statutory languages for public transport announcements in the Matsu Islands, Taiwan

Language codes
- ISO 639-3: –
- Glottolog: None
- Linguasphere: 79-AAA-ico
- IETF: cdo-u-sd-twlie
- Location of Matsu Islands

The Matsu dialect (Eastern Min: Mā-cū-uâ / 馬祖話) is the local dialect of Matsu Islands, Taiwan. Native speakers also call it Bàng-huâ (平話), meaning the language spoken in everyday life. It is recognised as one of the statutory languages for public transport announcements in Lienchiang County, Taiwan.

The dialect is a subdialect of the Fuzhou dialect of Eastern Min. The Matsu dialect is quite similar to the Changle dialect, another subdialect of the Fuzhou dialect.

== History ==
Previously, the Eastern Min varieties in the Matsu Islands were seen as a part of a general Fuzhounese group. It is under the name 'Northern Fujian (Fuzhou) Dialect' (Chinese: 閩北（福州）語) that the 2000 Act of Broadcasting Language Equality Protection in Public Transport mandated the use of the Matsu dialect on public transportation in the Matsu Islands.

The establishment of the People's Republic of China in 1949 severed the Matsu Islands from the rest of Fujian province, and as during the Cold War communications and transit were cut off between the Republic of China (now including the island of Taiwan and without mainland China) and the PRC, the identity of the Matsu Islands became established as separate to that of Fuzhou. The varieties of Eastern Min on the Matsu Islands have subsequently come to be seen as the Matsu dialect, which the ROC recognized as a 'native language' in 2017.

== Phonology ==
The Matsu dialect has 17 initials, 46 rimes and 7 tones, as reported by Tu (2006) based on elderly informants from Beigan:

=== Initials ===
| | | Bilabial | Alveolar | Velar | Glottal |
|---|---|---|---|---|---|
| Nasal | | /m/ (蒙) | /n/ (日) | /ŋ/ (語) | |
| Plosive | aspiration | /pʰ/ (波) | /tʰ/ (他) | /kʰ/ (氣) | |
| Plosive | plain | /p/ (邊) | /t/ (低) | /k/ (求) | /ʔ/ (鶯) |
| Fricative | | | /s/ (時) | | /h/ (喜) |
| Affricate | aspiration | | /tsʰ/ (出) | | |
| Affricate | plain | | /ts/ (曾) | | |
| Lateral | | | /l/ (柳) | | |

/β/ and /ʒ/ exist only in connected speech.

=== Rimes ===
There are 46 rimes in the Matsu dialect.

| monophthong | compound vowel | nasal coda -/ŋ/ | checked coda -/ʔ/ |
|---|---|---|---|
| [a/ɑ] (蝦/罷) | [ia/iɑ](寫/夜) | [aŋ/ɑŋ](三/汗) | [aʔ/ɑʔ](盒/鴨) |
| [ɛ/a] (街/細) | [ie/iɛ](雞/毅) | [iŋ/ɛiŋ](人/任) | [øʔ/œʔ](扔/嗝) |
| [œ/ɔ] (驢/告) | [iu/ieu](秋/笑) | [uŋ/ouŋ](春/鳳) | [eʔ/ɛʔ](漬/咩) |
| [o/ɔ] (哥/抱) | [ua/uɑ](花/話) | [yŋ/øyŋ](銀/頌) | [oʔ/ɔʔ](樂/閣) |
| [i/ɛi] (喜/氣) | [uo/uɔ](科/課) | [iaŋ/iɑŋ](驚/命) | [iʔ/ɛiʔ](力/乙) |
| [u/ou] (苦/怒) | [yo/yɔ](橋/銳) | [ieŋ/iɛŋ](天/見) | [uʔ/ouʔ](勿/福) |
| [y/øy] (豬/箸) | [ai/ɑi](紙/再) | [uaŋ/uɑŋ](歡/換) | [yʔ/øyʔ](肉/竹) |
| | [au/ɑu](郊/校) | [uoŋ/uɔŋ](王/象) | [iaʔ/iɑʔ](擲/察) |
| | [ɛu/ɑu](溝/構) | [yoŋ/yɔŋ](鄉/樣) | [ieʔ/iɛʔ](熱/鐵) |
| | [øy/ɔy](催/罪) | [ɛiŋ/aiŋ](恒/硬) | [uaʔ/uɑʔ](活/法) |
| | [uai/uɑi](我/怪) | [ouŋ/ɔuŋ](湯/寸) | [uoʔ/uɔʔ](月/郭) |
| | [ui/uoi](杯/歲) | [øyŋ/ɔyŋ](桶/洞) | [yoʔ/yɔʔ](藥/弱) |
| | | | [ɛiʔ/aiʔ](賊/黑) |
| | | | [ouʔ/ɔuʔ](學/骨) |
| | | | [øyʔ/ɔyʔ](讀/角) |

Many rimes come in pairs: in the table above, the one to the left represents a close rime (緊韻), while the second represents an open rime (鬆韻). The close/open rimes are closely related with the tones (see below).

=== Tone ===
These tones in isolation are as reported by Tu (2006), and use the historic names from Middle Chinese:

| No. | 1 | 2 | 3 | 4 | 5 | 6 | 7 |
| Tone name | dark level 陰平 | light level 陽平 | rising 上聲 | dark departing 陰去 | light departing 陽去 | dark entering 陰入 | light entering 陽入 |
| rime type | close rime | close rime | close rime | open rime | open rime | open rime | close rime |
| Tone contour | 55 ˥ | 51 ˥˩ | 33 ˧ | 312 ˧˩˨ | 131 ˩˧˩ | 13 ˩˧ | 5 ˥ |
| Example Hanzi | 君 /kuŋ˥/ | 臺 /tai˥˩/ | 祖 /tsu˧/ | 去 /kʰɔ˧˩˨/ | 話 /uɑ˩˧˩/ | 福 /houk̚˩˧/ | 掘 /kuk̚˥/ |

=== The relationship between tone and rime ===
In the Matsu dialect, both the level tones (平聲), rising tone (上聲) and the light entering tone (陽入) should be read using 'close rimes' (緊韻); both departing tones (去聲) and the dark entering tone (陰入) should be read with 'open rimes' (鬆韻). The closeness or openness of the rime refers to the height of the vowel.

For example, the vowel phoneme transcribed in Bàng-uâ-cê as "a̤" has two pronunciations, /ɛ/ as a close rime and /a/ as an open rime; the entering tone equivalent "a̤h" has two pronunciations, close rime /eʔ/ and open rime /ɛʔ/. This is summarized in the following table:

| Tone name | dark level | light level | rising | dark departing | light departing | dark entering | light entering |
| Tone contour | 55 ˥ | 51 ˥˩ | 33 ˧ | 312 ˧˩˨ | 131 ˩˧˩ | 13 ˩˧ | 5 ˥ |
| Rime type | close rime | close rime | close rime | open rime | open rime | open rime | close rime |
| Bàng-uâ-cê | ă̤ | à̤ | ā̤ | á̤ | â̤ | á̤h | ă̤h |
| Pronunciation | ɛ˥ | ɛ˥˩ | ɛ˧ | a˧˩˨ | a˩˧˩ | ɛʔ˩˧ | eʔ˥ |

Thus, in a close rime tone such as dark level "ă̤" should be pronounced as /ɛ˥/ instead of /a˥/; and in the open rime tone of light departing "â̤" should be pronounced as /a˩˧˩/ instead of /ɛ˩˧˩/.

=== Sandhi and assimilation ===
==== Tone sandhi ====
The Matsu dialect has extremely extensive tone sandhi rules: in an utterance, only the last syllable pronounced is not affected by the rules. The two-syllable tonal sandhi rules are shown in the table below (the rows give the first syllable's original citation tone, while the columns give the citation tone of the second syllable):

| | dark level 55 | light level 51 | light entering 5 | rising 33 | dark departing 312 | light departing 131 | dark entering 13 |
| dark level 55 | rising (33) | | | light level (51) | | | |
| dark departing 312 | rising (33) | | | light level (51) | | | |
| light departing 131 | rising (33) | | | light level (51) | | | |
| dark entering B 13 | rising (33) | | | light level (51) | | | |
| rising 33 | half dark departing (31) | | | modified dark entering (13) (with the tone value but not the entering coda /-ʔ/) | dark level (55) | | |
| dark entering A 13 | half dark departing (31) + /-ʔ/ (the first syllable retains its entering coda /-ʔ/) | | | dark entering (13) | light entering (5) | | |
| light level 51 | rising (33) | half dark departing (31) | | rising (33) | half dark departing (31) | | |
| light entering 5 | rising (33) or rising + /-ʔ/ | | | light level (51), or light entering (5) | | | |

In the table above, "dark entering A" means a dark entering coda that ends with /-k̚/, "dark entering B" refers to ending with /-ʔ/. In the modern spoken language, the final plosive is difficult to distinguish in isolation, having merged into /-ʔ/, but the two categories exhibit different behaviors from each other in tone sandhi environments. This feature is shared with many modern Eastern Min varieties, such as in Fuzhou.

Like the Fuzhou dialect, the tonal sandhi rules of more than two syllables display further complexities.

==== Initial assimilation ====
The two-syllable initial assimilation rules are shown in the table below:

| Coda of the Former Syllable | Initial Assimilation of the Latter Syllable |
|---|---|
| Null coda | /p/ and /pʰ/ change to /β/; /t/, /tʰ/ and /s/, /l/ and /n/ change to /l/; /ts/ and /tsʰ/ change to /ʒ/; /k/, /kʰ/ and /h/ change to null initial; /m/ and /ŋ/ remain unchanged. |
| Nasal coda /-ŋ/ | /p/ and /pʰ/ change to /m/; /t/, /tʰ/, /s/, /l/ and /n/ change to /n/; /ts/ and /tsʰ/ change to /ʒ/; /k/, /kʰ/, /h/ and null initial change to /ŋ/; /m/ and /ŋ/ remain unchanged. |
| entering coda (/-ʔ/, /-k̚/) | remain unchanged. |

==== Rime tensing ====
In the Matsu dialect, if the rime type of the former syllable is changed while tone sandhi occurred, the rime of the former syllable should be changed to adapt the rule of close/open rimes.

For example, "技" /kɛi˧˩˨/ is a syllable which has dark departing tone, it's an open rime; "師" /sy˥/ has a dark level tone. When combined as the phrase "技師" (technician), "技" changes its tonal value to rising tone. Rising tone is a close rime tone, therefore the pronunciation as a whole is /ki˧ ly˥/.
