= Judson Dwight Collins =

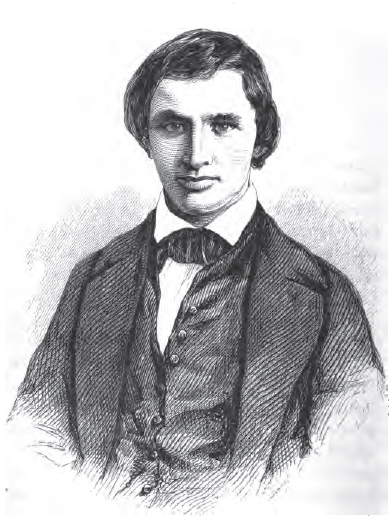
- Missionary to China
- Born: February 12, 1823; Rose, Wayne County, New York
- Died: May 13, 1852 (aged 29); Michigan
- Education: University of Michigan

Rev. Judson Dwight Collins (Chinese: 柯林; Pinyin: Kēlín; Foochow Romanized: Kŏ̤-lìng; February 12, 1823 - May 13, 1852) was the first Methodist missionary to China.

== Life ==
On February 12, 1823, Judson Dwight Collins was born into a Methodist family in Rose, Wayne County, New York. His parents, Alpheus and Betsay Collins, were of English and German origin. After graduation from the first class of the University of Michigan in Ann Arbor in 1845, Collins served as an instructor for two years at the Wesleyan Seminary at Albion College, teaching courses in Latin, Greek, chemistry, botany, and rhetoric.

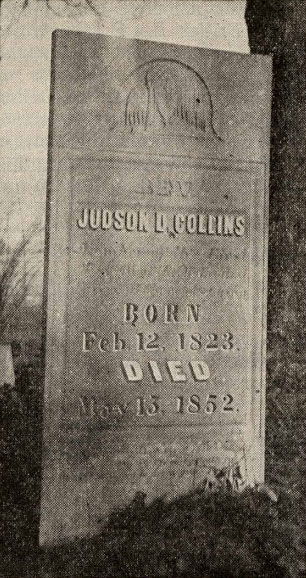
Grave of J.D. Collins

In 1847, Collins was called to New York, where he was ordained an elder and commissioned along with M. C. White and his wife to China. They sailed from Boston on April 15 and reached Fuzhou on September 6. To start an opening for the missionary work, Collins set up a school for boys in 1847 and another in 1848. He also worked with M. C. White on Bible translation and distribution of tracts. In 1850, he was appointed superintendent of the Foochow Mission.

Collins' short tenure in China was fraught with impediments and obstacles, including the strong Chinese xenophobia, the formidable language barrier, the poor sanitation and bad living conditions, and finally an illness that compelled him to return home to Michigan in 1851. He never regained his health afterwards, and at just 29 years of age, he died at his parents' home at Gregory, Lyndon Township, Washtenaw County, Michigan, where he is buried, May 1852, leaving no children.
