= Fuzhou dialect =

Eastern Min Chinese language

Fuzhounese
- 福州話 / Hók-ciŭ-uâ 福州語 / Hók-ciŭ-ngṳ̄ 平話 / Bàng-uâ
- Pronunciation: [huʔ˨˩ tsiu˥˧ ua˨˦˨]
- Native to: China (Fuzhou and its surrounding counties) and Taiwan (Matsu Islands)
- Ethnicity: Fuzhou
- Native speakers: (10 million cited 1994)
- Language family: Sino-Tibetan: Sinitic; Chinese; Min; Coastal Min; Eastern Min; Houguan; Fuzhounese
- Early forms: Proto-Sino-Tibetan: Old Chinese (Note: Min is believed to have split from Old Chinese, rather than Middle Chinese like other varieties of Chinese.); Eastern Han Chinese; Proto-Min
- Dialects: Matsu
- Writing system: Chinese characters and Foochow Romanized

Official status
- Official language in: Matsu Islands, Taiwan (as local language)
- Recognised minority language in: one of the statutory languages for public transport announcements in the Matsu Islands

Language codes
- ISO 639-3: –
- ISO 639-6: fzho
- Glottolog: fuzh1239
- Linguasphere: 79-AAA-ice
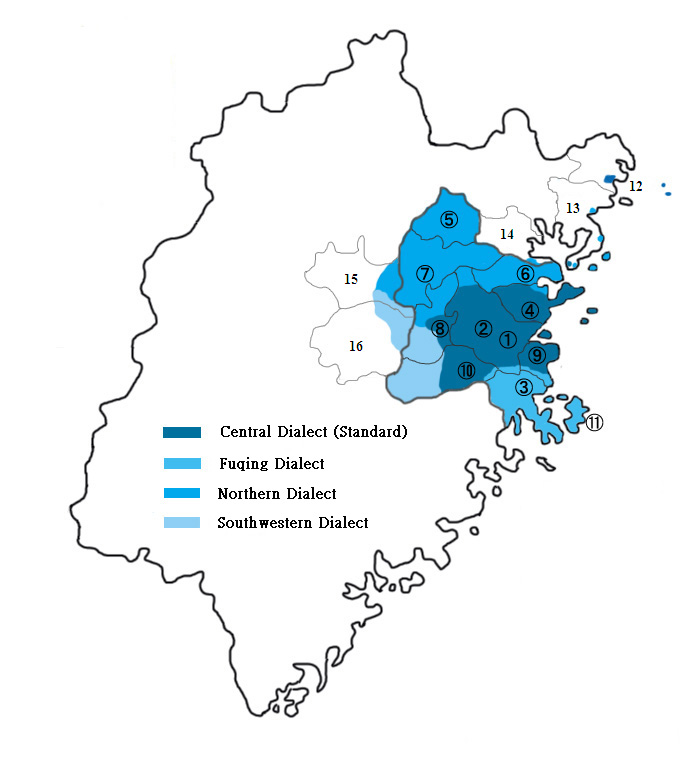
- The Fuzhou dialect in Fujian Province, regions where the standard form is spoken are deep blue. 1: Fuzhou City Proper, 2: Minhou, 3: Fuqing, 4: Lianjiang, 5: Pingnan; 6: Luoyuan, 7: Gutian, 8: Minqing, 9: Changle, 10: Yongtai, 11: Pingtan; 12: Regions in Fuding, 13: Regions in Xiapu, 14: Regions in Ningde; 15: Regions in Nanping, 16: Regions in Youxi

Fuzhounese
- Traditional Chinese: 福州話
- Simplified Chinese: 福州话
Transcriptions
Standard Mandarin
- Hanyu Pinyin: Fúzhōuhuà
Yue: Cantonese
- Jyutping: fuk^{1} zau^{1} waa^{2}
Southern Min
- Hokkien POJ: Hok-chiu-oē
Eastern Min
- Fuzhou BUC: Hók-ciŭ-uâ (huʔ˨˩ tsiu˥˧ ua˨˦˨)

Alternative Chinese name
- Traditional Chinese: 福州語
- Simplified Chinese: 福州语
Transcriptions
Standard Mandarin
- Hanyu Pinyin: Fúzhōuyǔ
Yue: Cantonese
- Jyutping: fuk^{1} zau^{1} jyu^{5}
Southern Min
- Hokkien POJ: Hok-chiu-gí
Eastern Min
- Fuzhou BUC: Hók-ciŭ-ngṳ̄ (huʔ˨˩ tsiu˥˧ ŋy˧)

Everyday language
- Traditional Chinese: 平話
- Simplified Chinese: 平话
Transcriptions
Standard Mandarin
- Hanyu Pinyin: Píng huà
Yue: Cantonese
- Jyutping: ping^{4} waa^{2}
Eastern Min
- Fuzhou BUC: Bàng-uâ (paŋ˨˩ wa˨˦˨)

The Fuzhou dialect (simplified Chinese: 福州话; traditional Chinese: 福州話; pinyin: Fúzhōuhuà; FR: Hók-ciŭ-uâ [huʔ˨˩ tsiu˥˧ ua˨˦˨]), also Foochow, Hokchew, Hok-chiu, Fuzhounese, or Fujianese, is the prestige variety of the Eastern Min branch of Min Chinese spoken mainly in the Mindong region of Eastern Fujian Province. It is mutually unintelligible to neighbouring varieties (e.g. Hinghua and Hokkien) in the province. Like many other varieties of Chinese, the Fuzhou dialect is dominated by monosyllabic morphemes that carry lexical tones, and has a mainly analytic syntax. While the Eastern Min branch it belongs to is relatively closer to other branches of Min such as Southern Min or Pu-Xian Min than to other Sinitic branches such as Mandarin, Wu Chinese or Hakka, they are still not mutually intelligible.

Centered in Fuzhou City, the Fuzhou dialect covers 11 cities and counties in China: Fuzhou City Proper, Pingnan, Gutian, Luoyuan, Minqing, Lianjiang, Minhou, Changle, Yongtai, Fuqing and Pingtan; and Lienchiang County (the Matsu Islands), in Taiwan (the ROC). It is also the second local language in many northern and middle Fujian cities and counties such as Nanping, Sanming, Shaowu, Shunchang, and Youxi.

The Fuzhou dialect is also widely spoken in some regions abroad, many Fuzhou people have emigrated to Japan, the United States, Canada, the United Kingdom, Australia, New Zealand, and some Southeastern Asian cities. The Malaysian city of Sibu is called "New Fuzhou" due to the influx of immigrants there in the late 19th century and early 1900s.

== Name ==
In Chinese, it is generally termed in simplified Chinese: 福州话; traditional Chinese: 福州話; pinyin: Fúzhōuhuà, which in the native language (using the romanization Foochow Romanized) is: Hók-ciŭ-uâ [huʔ˨˩ tsiu˥˧ ua˨˦˨]. It is also sometimes called 福州語 (Hók-ciŭ-ngṳ̄; pinyin: Fúzhōuyǔ), using a different term for 'speech'. Native speakers also call it Bàng-uâ (平話), meaning "the everyday language".

In English, the term "Fuzhou dialect" dominates, although "Fuzhounese" is also frequently attested. In older works written in English, the variety is called "Foochow dialect", based on the Chinese postal romanization of Fuzhou.

== History ==
=== Formation ===
After the Han dynasty conquered the Minyue kingdom of Southeast China in 110 BC, Chinese people began settling what is now Fujian Province. The Old Chinese language brought by the mass influx of Chinese immigrants from the Chinese heartland, along with the influences of local languages, became the early Proto-Min language from which Eastern Min, Southern Min, and other Min languages arose. Within this Min branch of Chinese, Eastern Min and Southern Min both form part of a Coastal Min subgroup, and are thus closer to each other than to Inland Min groups such as Northern Min and Central Min.

The famous book Qī Lín Bāyīn, which was compiled in the 17th century, is the first and the most full-scale rime book that provides a systematic guide to character reading for people speaking or learning the Fuzhou dialect. It once served to standardize the language and is still widely quoted as an authoritative reference book in modern academic research in Min Chinese phonology.

=== Studies by Western missionaries ===
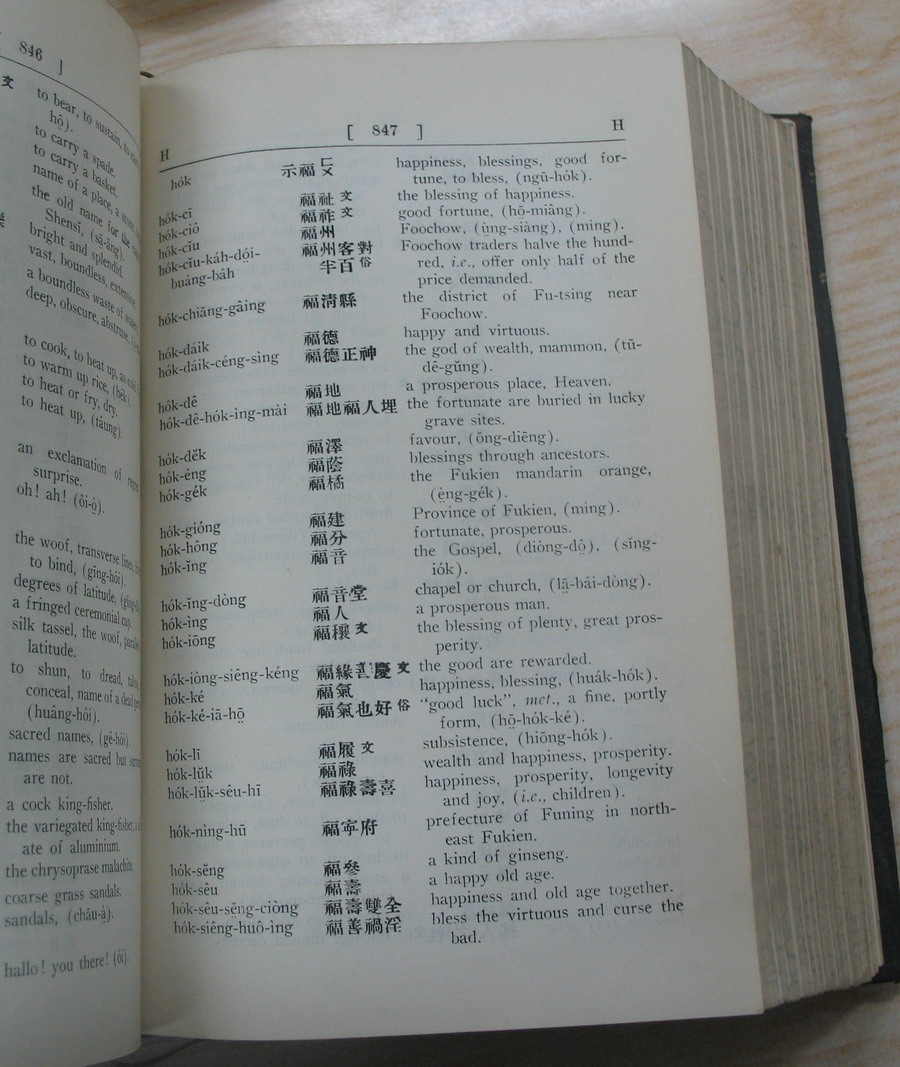
A page in the "Dictionary of the Foochow dialect", 3rd Edition, published in 1929

In 1842, Fuzhou was open to Westerners as a treaty port after the signing of the Treaty of Nanjing. But due to the language barrier, however, the first Christian missionary base in this city did not take place without difficulties. In order to convert Fuzhou people, those missionaries found it very necessary to make a careful study of the Fuzhou dialect. Their most notable works are listed below:

- 1856, M. C. White: The Chinese language spoken at Fuh Chau
- 1870, R. S. Maclay & C. C. Baldwin: An alphabetic dictionary of the Chinese language in the Foochow dialect
- 1871, C. C. Baldwin: Manual of the Foochow dialect
- 1891, T. B. Adam: An English-Chinese dictionary of the Foochow dialect
- 1893, Charles Hartwell: Three Character Classic of Gospel in the Foochow Colloquial
- 1898, R. S. Maclay & C. C. Baldwin: An Alphabetic Dictionary of the Chinese Language of the Foochow Dialect, 2nd edition
- 1905, T. B. Adam: An English-Chinese dictionary of the Foochow dialect, 2nd edition
- 1906, The Foochow translation of the complete Bible
- 1923, T. B. Adam & L. P. Peet: An English-Chinese dictionary of the Foochow dialect, 2nd edition
- 1929, R. S. Maclay & C. C. Baldwin (revised and enlarged by S. H. Leger): Dictionary of the Foochow dialect

=== Status quo ===
By the end of the Qing dynasty, Fuzhou society had been largely monolingual. Nearly a century later, the subsequent Chinese government has, for decades, discouraged the use of the vernacular in school education and in media, greatly boosting the number of Mandarin speakers instead. Reports in 2006 indicate that a majority of young people in Fuzhou cannot speak the Fuzhou dialect.

In Mainland China, the Fuzhou dialect has been officially listed as an Intangible Cultural Heritage and promotion work is being systematically carried out to preserve its use. In Matsu, currently controlled by the Republic of China located in Taiwan, the teaching of the local variant, the Matsu dialect, has been successfully introduced into elementary schools. It is also one of the statutory languages for public transport announcements in Matsu and in Fuzhou.

== Writing system ==
=== Chinese characters ===
Most words of the Fuzhou dialect stem from Old Chinese and can therefore be written in Chinese characters. However, Chinese characters as the writing system for the Fuzhou dialect can have many shortcomings, since a great number of words are unique to the Fuzhou dialect and it lacks a formal writing system due to exclusion from the educational system for many decades.

=== Foochow Romanized ===
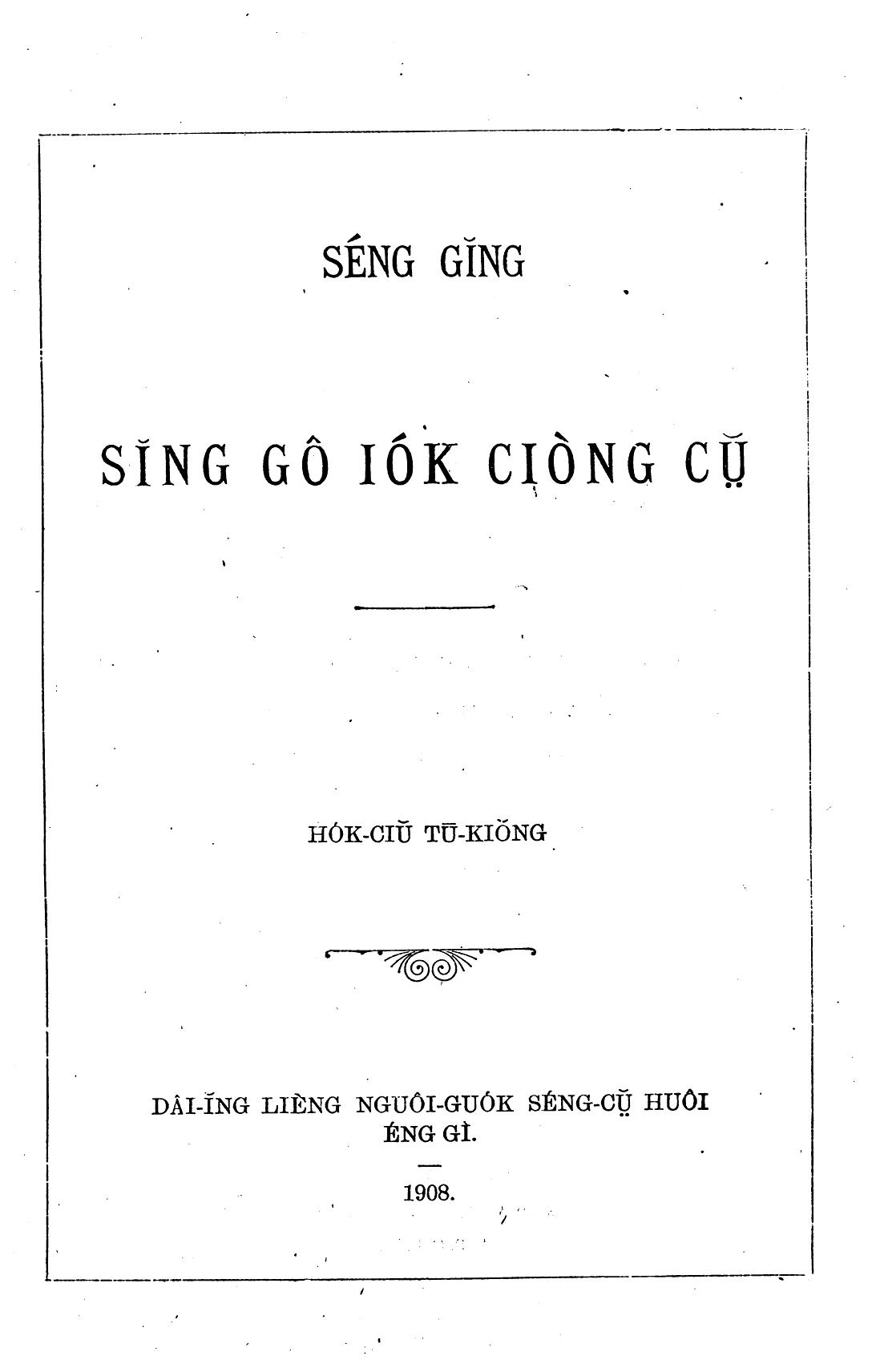
Bible in Foochow Romanized, published by British and Foreign Bible Society in 1908.

Foochow Romanized, also known as Bàng-uâ-cê (平話字, BUC for short) or Hók-ciŭ-uâ Lò̤-mā-cê (福州話羅馬字), is a romanized orthography for the Fuzhou dialect adopted in the middle of 19th century by American and English missionaries. It had varied at different times, and became standardized several decades later. Foochow Romanized was mainly used inside of church circles, and was taught in some mission schools in Fuzhou.

== Phonology ==
Like all Chinese varieties, the Fuzhou dialect is a tonal language, and has extensive sandhi rules in the initials, rimes, and tones. These complicated rules make the Fuzhou dialect one of the most difficult Chinese varieties.

=== Tones ===
There are seven original tones in the Fuzhou dialect, compared with the eight tones of Middle Chinese:

Name	Tone contour	Description	Example
Dark-level (Ĭng-bìng 陰平)	˥	high level	君
Rising tone (Siōng-siăng 上聲)	˧	middle level	滾
Dark-departing (Ĭng-ké̤ṳ 陰去)	˨˩˧	low falling and rising	貢
Dark-entering (Ĭng-ĭk 陰入)	˨˦	middle rising stopped	谷
Light-level (Iòng-bìng 陽平)	˥˧	high falling	群
Light-departing (Iòng-ké̤ṳ 陽去)	˨˦˨	middle rising and falling	郡
Light-entering (Iòng-ĭk 陽入)	˥	high level stopped	掘

The sample characters are taken from the Qī Lín Bāyīn. More modern studies have also been done in the late 20th century and early 21st centuries, including an acoustically quantified set of data for the citation tones.

In Qī Lín Bāyīn, the Fuzhou dialect is described as having eight tones, which explains how the book got its title (Bāyīn means "eight tones"). That name, however, is somewhat misleading, because Ĭng-siōng (陰上) and Iòng-siōng (陽上) are identical in tone contour; therefore, only seven tones exist.

Ĭng-ĭk and Iòng-ĭk (or so-called entering tone) syllables end with either velar stop [k] or a glottal stop [ʔ]. However, they are both now realized as a glottal stop, though the two phonemes maintain distinct sandhi behavior in connected speech.

Besides those seven tones listed above, two new tonal values, "˨˩" (Buáng-ĭng-ké̤ṳ, 半陰去) and ˧˥ (Buáng-iòng-ké̤ṳ, 半陽去) occur in connected speech (see Tonal sandhi below).

Little discussed in the existing literature, there is some evidence that Fuzhou uses non-modal phonation with certain tones: creaky for 陰去 ĭng-ké̤ṳ, 陰入 ĭng-ĭk, 陽去 iòng-ké̤ṳ, and breathy for 上聲 siōng-siăng. This has been shown to be perceptually relevant for tonal identification.

==== Tonal sandhi ====
The rules of tonal sandhi in the Fuzhou dialect are complicated, even compared with those of other Min dialects. When two or more than two morphemes combine into a word, the tonal value of the last morpheme remains stable but in most cases those of the preceding morphemes change. For example, "獨", "立" and "日" are words of iòng-ĭk (陽入) with the same tonal value ˥, and are pronounced [tuʔ˥], [liʔ˥], and [niʔ˥], respectively. When combined as the phrase "獨立日" (Independence Day), "獨" changes its tonal value to ˨˩, and "立" changes its to ˧, therefore the pronunciation as a whole is [tuʔ˨˩ liʔ˧ niʔ˥].

The two-syllable tonal sandhi rules are shown in the table below (the rows give the first syllable's original citation tone, while the columns give the citation tone of the second syllable):

	ĭng-bìng (陰平 ˥)	iòng-bìng (陽平 ˥˧) iòng-ĭk (陽入 ˥)	siōng-siăng (上聲 ˧)	ĭng-ké̤ṳ (陰去 ˨˩˧) iòng-ké̤ṳ (陽去 ˨˦˨) ĭng-ĭk (陰入 ˨˦)
ĭng-bìng (陰平 ˥) ĭng-ké̤ṳ (陰去 ˨˩˧) iòng-ké̤ṳ (陽去 ˨˦˨) ĭng-ĭk-ék (陰入乙 ˨˦)	˥	˥	˥˧	˥˧
iòng-bìng (陽平 ˥˧) iòng-ĭk (陽入 ˥)	˥	˧	˧	˨˩
siōng-siăng (上聲 ˧) ĭng-ĭk-gák (陰入甲 ˨˦)	˨˩	˨˩	˧˥	˥

Ĭng-ĭk-gák (陰入甲) are ĭng-ĭk (陰入) syllables ending with -k /k/ and ĭng-ĭk-ék (陰入乙) are those with a final -h /ʔ/. This distinction made between the glottal stop and the -k is said to have been maintained in the literary readings of characters until quite recently. Both are usually realized as the glottal stop by most modern speakers of the Fuzhou dialect, and have the same tone in isolation, but they are still distinguished both in the above tone sandhi behavior, and in initial assimilation that occurs after them. Although the iòng-ĭk (陽入) tone is also a checked tone composed of both types of syllables, in -k and in -h, there is no split in its realization, either in isolation or in its tone sandhi behavior.

The three patterns of tone sandhi exhibited in the Fuzhou dialect may be a reflex of the voicing split from Middle Chinese into different registers. This is based on a comparison with the tonal sandhi system of the subdialect of Lianjiang, a very similar but more conservative Eastern Min variety, where three tonal categories on penultimate syllables ("Yin" / Ĭng / 陰 from unvoiced consonants in Middle Chinese; "yang" / iòng / 陽 from voiced consonants in Middle Chinese; and a third "shang" / siōng / 上 tonal category from the Middle Chinese "rising tone" 上聲 where the Yin and Yang registers have merged) interact with the tonal category of the final syllable to form the sandhi pattern in Lianjiang. Although the effect of the historical tonal registers from Middle Chinese is clear in Lianjiang, the Fuzhou tonal sandhi system has deviated from the older pattern, in that the tone iòng-ké̤ṳ 陽去˨˦˨, which is from the historical "Yang" tonal register, now follows the sandhi rules for the "Yin" register; and the sandhi tone ĭng-ĭk-gák 陰入乙 ˨˦, which comes from the historical "Yin" register, follow the sandhi rules for the merged "Shang" tone.

The tonal sandhi rules of more than two syllables display further complexities. For three-syllable domains:

Original tones			After tone sandhi		
First syllable	Second syllable	Third syllable	First syllable	Second syllable	Third syllable
All tones	Dark level /˥/ Dark departing /˨˩˧/ Light departing /˨˦˨/ Dark checked (B) /˨˦/	Dark level /˥/ Light level /˥˧/ Light checked /˥/	Half dark departing /˨˩/	Dark level /˥/	No change
All tones	Dark level /˥/ Dark departing /˨˩˧/ Light departing /˨˦˨/ Dark checked (B) /˨˦/	Rising /˧/ Dark departing /˨˩˧/ Light departing /˨˦˨/ Dark checked /˨˦/	Half dark departing /˨˩/	Light level /˥˧/	No change
All tones	Rising /˧/ Dark checked (A) /˨˦/	Dark level /˥/ Light level /˥˧/ Light checked /˥/	Half dark departing /˨˩/	Half dark departing /˨˩/	No change
All tones	Rising /˧/ Dark checked (A) /˨˦/	Rising /˧/	Half dark departing /˨˩/	Half light departing /˧˥/	No change
All tones	Rising /˧/ Dark checked (A) /˨˦/	Dark departing /˨˩˧/ Light departing /˨˦˨/ Dark checked /˨˦/	Half dark departing /˨˩/	Dark level /˥/	No change
Dark level /˥/ Dark departing /˨˩˧/ Light departing /˨˦˨/ Dark checked (B) /˨˦/	Light level /˥˧/ Light checked /˥/	Dark level /˥/ Light level /˥˧/ Light checked /˥/	Dark level /˥/	Dark level /˥/	No change
Dark level /˥/ Dark departing /˨˩˧/ Light departing /˨˦˨/ Dark checked (B) /˨˦/	Light level /˥˧/ Light checked /˥/	Rising /˧/	Light level /˥˧/	Rising /˧/	No change
Dark level /˥/ Dark departing /˨˩˧/ Light departing /˨˦˨/ Dark checked (B) /˨˦/	Light level /˥˧/ Light checked /˥/	Dark departing /˨˩˧/ Light departing /˨˦˨/ Dark checked /˨˦/	Light level /˥˧/	Half dark departing /˨˩/	No change
Rising /˧/ Dark checked (A) /˨˦/	Light level /˥˧/ Light checked /˥/	Dark level /˥/ Light level /˥˧/ Light checked /˥/ Rising /˧/	Half light departing /˧˥/	Rising /˧/	No change
Rising /˧/ Dark checked (A) /˨˦/	Light level /˥˧/ Light checked /˥/	Dark departing /˨˩˧/ Light departing /˨˦˨/ Dark checked /˨˦/	Dark level /˥/	Half dark departing /˨˩/	No change
Light level /˥˧/ Light checked /˥/	Light level /˥˧/ Light checked /˥/	Dark level /˥/ Light level /˥˧/ Light checked /˥/ Rising /˧/	Rising /˧/	Rising /˧/	No change
Light level /˥˧/ Light checked /˥/	Light level /˥˧/ Light checked /˥/	Dark departing /˨˩˧/ Light departing /˨˦˨/ Dark checked /˨˦/	Half dark departing /˨˩/	Half dark departing /˨˩/	No change

Four-syllable words can be treated as two sequential two-syllable units, and undergo two-syllable tone sandhi accordingly; in faster speech, the first two syllables are reduced to a half dark departing tone, and the remaining two syllables undergo two-syllable tone sandhi. A domain of four syllables is the maximum, with anything larger broken down to into smaller domains.

=== Initials ===
There are fifteen initials, including a zero initial realized as a glottal stop [ʔ]:

		Bilabial	Alveolar	Velar	Glottal
Nasal		/m/ (蒙)	/n/ (日)	/ŋ/ (語)	
Plosive	aspirated	/pʰ/ (波)	/tʰ/ (他)	/kʰ/ (氣)	
Plosive	plain	/p/ (邊)	/t/ (低)	/k/ (求)	/ʔ/ (鶯)
Fricative			/s/ (時)		/h/ (喜)
Affricate	aspirated		/tsʰ/ (出)		
Affricate	plain		/ts/ (曾)		
Lateral			/l/ (柳)		

The Chinese characters in the brackets are also sample characters from Qī Lín Bāyīn.

Some speakers find it difficult to distinguish between the initials /n/ and /l/.

No labiodental phonemes, such as /f/ or /v/, exist in the Fuzhou dialect, which is one of the most conspicuous characteristics shared by all branches in the Min Family.

[β] and [ʒ] exist only in connected speech (see Initial assimilation below).

==== Initial assimilation ====
In the Fuzhou dialect, there are various kinds of initial assimilation, all of which are progressive. When two or more than two syllables combine into a word, the initial of the first syllable stays unchanged while those of the following syllables, in most cases, change to match its preceding phoneme, i.e., the coda of its preceding syllable. As with the rime changes, initial assimilation is not as mandatory as tone sandhi in connected speech, and its presence and absence may indicate different parts of speech, different meanings of a single word, or different relationships between groups of words syntactically.

The Coda of the Former Syllable	The Initial Assimilation of the Latter Syllable
Null coda or /-ʔ/	/p/ and /pʰ/ change to [β]; /t/, /tʰ/ and /s/ change to [l]; /k/, /kʰ/ and /h/ change to null initial (without [ʔ]); /ts/ and /tsʰ/ change to [ʒ]; /m/, /n/, /ŋ/ and the null initial remain unchanged.
/-ŋ/	/p/ and /pʰ/ change to [m]; /t/, /tʰ/ /s/ and /l/ change to [n]; /k/, /kʰ/, /h/ and the null initial change to [ŋ]; /ts/ and /tsʰ/ change to [ʒ]; /m/, /n/ and /ŋ/ remain unchanged.
/-k/	All initials remain unchanged.

Note that although /-k/ and /-ʔ/ are generally pronounced the same in isolation, realized as a final glottal stop [-ʔ], they cause drastically different effects on the initials that follow. They also differ in how common it is to drop them in natural linked speech. These have been called prelinked and floating glottal stops respectively in academic literature.

=== Rimes ===
The table below shows the seven vowel phonemes of the Fuzhou dialect. Fuzhou is known for its vowel alternations much discussed in the linguistic literature.

	Front		Central	Back
	Unrounded	Rounded	Central	Back
Close	/i/ [i~ɛi]	/y/ [y~œy]		/u/ [u~ɔu]
Mid	/e/ [e~a]	/ø/ [ø~ɔ]		/o/ [o~ɔ]
Open			/a/	

In the Fuzhou dialect, the codas /-m/, /-n/, and /-ŋ/ have all merged as /-ŋ/, and /-p/, /-t/, /-k/ have all merged as /-ʔ/. Seven vowel phonemes, together with the codas /-ŋ/ and /-ʔ/, are organized into forty-six rimes.

	Monophthongs						
	/a/	/e/	/ø/	/o/	/i/	/u/	/y/
Open syllable	[a] (蝦, 罷)	[e, a] (街, 細)	[ø, ɔ] (驢, 告)	[o, ɔ] (哥, 抱)	[i, ɛi] (喜, 氣)	[u, ɔu] (苦, 怒)	[y, œy] (豬, 箸)
Nasal Coda /-ŋ/	[aŋ] (三, 汗)				[iŋ, ɛiŋ] (人, 任)	[uŋ, ɔuŋ] (春, 鳳)	[yŋ, œyŋ] (銀, 頌)
Glottal Coda /-ʔ/	[aʔ] (盒, 鴨)	[eʔ] (漬)	[øʔ] (扔)	[oʔ, ɔʔ] (樂, 閣)	[iʔ, ɛiʔ] (力, 乙)	[uʔ, ɔuʔ] (勿, 福)	[yʔ, œyʔ] (肉, 竹)

	Rising diphthongs					Falling diphthongs							
	/ja/	/je/	/wa/	/wo/	/ɥo/	/ai/	/au/	/eu/	/ei/	/ou/	/øy/	/iu/	/ui/
Open syllable	[ja] (寫, 夜)	[je] (雞, 毅)	[wa] (花, 話)	[wo] (科, 課)	[ɥo] (橋, 銳)	[ai] (紙, 再)	[au] (郊, 校)	[eu, au] (溝, 構)			[øy, ɔy] (催, 罪)	[iu] (秋, 笑)	[ui] (杯, 歲)
Nasal Coda /-ŋ/	[jaŋ] (驚, 命)	[jeŋ] (天, 見)	[waŋ] (歡, 換)	[woŋ] (王, 象)	[ɥoŋ] (鄉, 樣)				[eiŋ, aiŋ] (恒, 硬)	[ouŋ, ɔuŋ] (湯, 寸)	[øyŋ, ɔyŋ] (桶, 洞)		
Glottal Coda /-ʔ/	[jaʔ] (擲, 察)	[jeʔ] (熱, 鐵)	[waʔ] (活, 法)	[woʔ] (月, 郭)	[ɥoʔ] (藥, 弱)				[eiʔ, aiʔ] (賊, 黑)	[ouʔ, ɔuʔ] (學, 骨)	[øyʔ, ɔyʔ] (讀, 角)		

	Triphthong
/wai/
Open syllable	[wai] (我, 怪)

As has been mentioned above, there are theoretically two different entering tonal codas in the Fuzhou dialect: /-k/ and /-ʔ/. However, for most Fuzhou dialect speakers, those two codas are only distinguishable when in the tonal sandhi or initial assimilation.

==== Close/Open rimes ====
Some rimes come in pairs in the above table: the one to the left represents a close rime (緊韻), while the other represents an open rime (鬆韻). This vowel alternation of close/open rimes is closely related with the tones. In single syllables, the tones of ĭng-bìng (陰平), siōng-siăng (上聲), iòng-bìng (陽平) and iòng-ĭk (陽入) have close rimes, while ĭng-ké̤ṳ (陰去), ĭng-ĭk (陰入) and ĭòng-ké̤ṳ (陽去) have open rimes.

In connected speech, an open rime shifts to its close counterpart in the tonal sandhi. For instance, "福" (hók) is a ĭng-ĭk syllable and is pronounced [hɔuʔ˨˦] and "州" (ciŭ) a ĭng-bìng syllable with the pronunciation of [tsiu˥]. When these two syllables combine into the word "福州" (hók-ciŭ, Fuzhou), "福" changes its tonal value from ˨˦ to ˨˩ and, simultaneously, shifts its rime from [-ɔuʔ] to [-uʔ], so the phrase is pronounced [huʔ˨˩ tsiu˥]. In contrast, in the word "中國" [tyŋ˥˧ kuoʔ˨˦] (Dṳ̆ng-guók, China), "中" is a ĭng-bìng syllable and therefore its close rime never changes, though it does change its tonal value from ˥ to ˥˧ in tonal sandhi.

As with initial assimilation, the closing of open rimes in connected speech is not as compulsory as tone sandhi. It has been described as "a sort of switch that flips on and off to indicate different things", so its presence or absence can indicate different meanings or different syntactic functions.

The phenomenon of close/open rimes is nearly unique to the Fuzhou dialect and this feature makes it especially intricate and reduces its intelligibility, even to speakers of other Min varieties. Even cross-linguistically, such phonological tone-vowel interactions are rare.

=== Other phonological features ===
==== Neutral tone ====
The neutral tone is attested in the Fuzhou dialect, as well as being found in the Southern Min group and in varieties of Mandarin Chinese, including Beijing-based Standard Mandarin. It is commonly found in some modal particles, aspect markers, and some question-forming negative particles that come after units made up of one tone sandhi domain, and in some adverbs, aspect markers, conjunctions etc. that come before such units. These two types, the post-nucleus and the pre-nucleus neutral tone, exhibit different tone sandhi behavior. Disyllabic neutral tone words are also attested, as are some inter-nuclei neutral tones, mainly connected to the use of 蜀 siŏh /suoʔ˥/ in verbal reduplication.

== Vocabulary ==
Most words in the Fuzhou dialect have cognates in other varieties of Chinese, so a non-Fuzhou speaker would find it much easier to understand the Fuzhou dialect written in Chinese characters than spoken in conversation. However, false friends do exist: for example, "莫細膩" (mŏ̤h sá̤-nê) means "don't be too polite" or "make yourself at home", "我對手汝洗碗" (nguāi dó̤i-chiū nṳ̄ sā̤ uāng) means "I help you wash dishes", "伊共伊老媽嚟冤家" (ĭ gâe̤ng ĭ lâu-mā lā̤ uŏng-gă) means "he and his wife are quarreling (with each other)", etc. Mere knowledge of Mandarin vocabulary, with the cognates 細膩 xìnì, 對手 duìshǒu and 冤家 yuānjiā, does not assist in understanding the nuance of such sentences.

The majority of Fuzhou dialect vocabulary dates back more than 1,200 years. Some everyday words are still in use as they were in the Tang dynasty, as illustrated by a poem of a renowned Chinese poet of the era, Gu Kuang. In his poem Jiǎn (囝), Gu Kuang explicitly noted:

囝，音蹇。閩俗呼子為囝，父為郎罷。
"囝 is pronounced as 蹇. In Fujian vernacular son is called 囝, and father 郎罷."

In the Fuzhou dialect, "囝" (giāng) for 'son' and "郎罷" (nòng-mâ) for 'father' are still in use today.

=== Words from Old Chinese ===
Quite a few words from Old Chinese have retained the original meanings for thousands of years, while their counterparts in Mandarin Chinese have either fallen out of daily use or varied to different meanings.

This table shows some Fuzhou dialect words from Old Chinese, as contrasted to Mandarin Chinese:

Meaning	Fuzhou dialect	Foochow Romanized	Mandarin	Pinyin
eye	目睭/目珠	mĕ̤k-ciŭ [møyʔ˥ tsju˥]	眼睛	yǎnjīng
you	汝	nṳ̄ [ny˧]	你	nǐ
chopstick	箸	dê̤ṳ [tøy˨˦˨]	筷子	kuàizi
to chase	逐	dṳ̆k [tyʔ˥]	追	zhuī
to look, to watch	覷/覰/䁦	ché̤ṳ [tsʰœy˨˩˧]	看^{1}	kàn
wet	潤	nóng [nɔuŋ˨˩˧]	濕	shī
black	烏	ŭ [u˥]	黑	hēi
to feed	豢	huáng [hwaŋ˨˩˧]	養²	yǎng

^{1} "看" (káng) is also used as the verb "to look" in the Fuzhou dialect.
^{2} "養" (iōng) in the Fuzhou dialect means "give birth to (a child)".

This table shows some words that are used in the Fuzhou dialect close to as they were in Classical Chinese, while the meanings in Mandarin Chinese have altered:

Word	Foochow Romanized	Meaning in Classical Chinese and the Fuzhou dialect	Pinyin	Meaning in Mandarin
細	sá̤ [sa˨˩˧]	tiny, small, young	xì	thin, slender
說	suók/siók [swoʔ˨˦]	to explain, to clarify	shuō	to speak, to talk
懸	gèng [keiŋ˥˧]	tall, high	xuán	to hang, to suspend (v.)
喙	chói [tsʰwi˨˩˧]	mouth	huì	beak

=== Words from Ancient Minyue language ===
Some daily used words, shared by all Min varieties, came from the ancient Minyue language. Such as follows:

Word	Foochow Romanized	Southern Min / Taiwanese POJ	Meaning
骹	kă ([kʰa˥])	kha ([kʰa˥])	foot and leg
囝	giāng [kjaŋ˧]	kiáⁿ ([kjã˥˩])	son, child, whelp, a small amount
睏	káung [kʰauŋ˨˩˧]	khùn [kʰun˨˩]	to sleep
骿	piăng [pʰjaŋ˥]	phiaⁿ [pʰjã˥]	back, dorsum
儂	nè̤ng [nøyŋ˥˧]	lâng [laŋ˨˦]	human
厝	chuó/chió [tsʰwo˨˩˧]	chhù [tsʰu˨˩]	home, house
刣	tài [tʰai˥˧]	thâi [tʰai˨˦]	to kill, to slaughter

=== Literary and colloquial readings ===
The literary and colloquial readings is a feature commonly found in all Chinese dialects throughout China. Literary readings are mainly used in formal phrases derived from the written language, while the colloquial ones are used in colloquial phrases in the spoken language, as well as when used on their own.

Phonologically, a large range of phonemes can differ between the character's two readings: in tone, final, initial, or any and all of these features.

This table displays some widely used characters in the Fuzhou dialect which have both literary and colloquial readings:

Character	Literary reading	Phrase	Meaning	Colloquial reading	Phrase	Meaning
行	hèng [heiŋ˥˧]	行李 hèng-lī	luggage	giàng [kjaŋ˥˧]	行墿 giàng-duô	to walk
生	sĕng [seiŋ˥]	生態 sĕng-tái	zoology, ecology	săng [saŋ˥]	生囝 săng-giāng	childbearing
江	gŏng [kouŋ˥]	江蘇 Gŏng-sŭ	Jiangsu	gĕ̤ng [køyŋ˥]	閩江 Mìng-gĕ̤ng	Min River
百	báik [paiʔ˨˦]	百科 báik-kuŏ	encyclopedical	báh [paʔ˨˦]	百姓 báh-sáng	common people
飛	hĭ [hi˥]	飛機 hĭ-gĭ	aeroplane	buŏi [pwi˥]	飛鳥 buŏi-cēu	flying birds
寒	hàng [haŋ˥˧]	寒食 Hàng-sĭk	Cold Food Festival	gàng [kaŋ˥˧]	天寒 tiĕng gàng	cold, freezing
廈	hâ [ha˨˦˨]	大廈 dâi-hâ	mansion	â [a˨˦˨]	廈門 Â-muòng	Amoy (Xiamen)

=== Loan words from English ===
The First Opium War, also known as the First Anglo-Chinese War, was ended in 1842 with the signing of the Treaty of Nanjing, which forced the Qing government to open Fuzhou to all British traders and missionaries. Since then, quite a number of churches and Western-style schools have been established. Consequently, some English words came into the Fuzhou dialect, but without fixed written forms in Chinese characters. The most frequently used words are listed below:

- kŏk, [kʰouʔ˥], noun, meaning "an article of dress", is from the word "coat";
- nă̤h, [neʔ˥], noun, meaning "a meshwork barrier in tennis or badminton", is from the word "net";
- pèng, [pʰeiŋ˥˧], noun, meaning "oil paint", is from the word "paint";
- pĕng-giāng, [pʰeiŋ˥˧ ŋjaŋ˧], noun, meaning "a small sum of money", is from the word "penny";
- tă̤h, [tʰeʔ˥], noun, meaning "money", is from the word "take";
- sò̤, [so˥˧], verb, meaning "to shoot (a basket)", is from the word "shoot";
- ă-gì, [a˥ ki˥˧], verb, meaning "to pause (usually a game)", is from the word "again".
- Mā-lăk-gă, [ma˨˩ laʔ˥ ka˥], meaning "Southeastern Asian (esp. Singapore and Malaysia)", is from the word "Malacca".

== Examples ==
Some common phrases in the Fuzhou dialect:

- Fuzhou dialect: 福州話 Hók-ciŭ-uâ [huʔ˨˩ tsiu˥˧ ua˨˦˨]
- Hello: 汝好 Nṳ̄ hō̤ [ny˧ ho˧]
- Good-bye: 再見 Cái-giéng [tsai˥˧ kjeŋ˨˩˧]
- Please: 請 Chiāng [tsʰjaŋ˧]; 起動 Kī-dâe̤ng [kʰi˥ lɔyŋ˨˦˨]
- Thank you: 謝謝 Siâ-siâ [sja˥˧ lja˨˦˨]; 起動 Kī-dâe̤ng [kʰi˥ lɔyŋ˨˦˨]
- Sorry: 對不住 Dó̤i-bók-cê̤ṳ [tøy˨˩ puʔ˥ tsøy˨˦˨]
- This: 嚽 Cuòi [tsui˥˧]; 啫 Ciā [tsja˧]; 茲 Cī [tsi˧]
- That: 噲 Huòi [hui˥˧]; 嘻 Hiā [hja˧]; 許 Hī [hi˧]
- How much?: 偌 Nuâi [nwai˨˦˨] (niŏh-uâi [nwoʔ˨˩ wai˨˦˨])
- Yes: 正是 Ciáng-sê [tsjaŋ˥˧ nɛi˨˦˨]; 無綻 Mò̤ dâng [mo˨˩ laŋ˨˦˨]; 著 Diŏh [tɥoʔ˥] (Duŏh [twoʔ˥])
- No: 伓是 Ng-sê [ŋ˥˧ nɛi˨˦˨]; 綻 Dâng [taŋ˨˦˨]; 賣著 Mâ̤ diŏh [me˥ tɥoʔ˥] (Mâ̤ duŏh [me˥ twoʔ˥])
- I don't understand: 我賣會意 Nguāi mâ̤ huôi-é [ŋwai˧ me˨˩ hui˥˧ ɛi˨˩˧]
- What's his name?: 伊名什乇？ Ĭ miàng sié-nó̤h? [i˥ mjaŋ˥˧ sje˨˩ nɔʔ˨˦]
- Where's the hotel?: 賓館洽底所？ Bĭng-guāng găk diē-nē̤? [piŋ˥˧ kwaŋ˧ kaʔ˥ tje˨˦ nø˧]
- How can I go to the school?: 去學校怎樣行？ Kó̤ hăk-hâu cuōng-iông giàng? [kʰo˥˧ haʔ˨˩ hau˨˦˨ tswoŋ˥ ɥoŋ˨˦˨ kjaŋ˥˧]
- Do you speak the Fuzhou dialect?: 汝會講福州話賣？ Nṳ̄ â̤ gōng Hók-ciŭ-uâ mâ̤? [ny˧ e˥˧ kouŋ˧ huʔ˨˩ tsiu˥˧ wa˨˦˨ ma˨˦˨]
- Do you speak English?: 汝會講英語賣？ Nṳ̄ â̤ gōng Ĭng-ngṳ̄ mâ̤? [ny˧ e˥˧ kouŋ˧ iŋ˥˧ ŋy˧ ma˨˦˨]

=== Example text ===
Below is Article 1 of the Universal Declaration of Human Rights written in the Fuzhou dialect, using both Foochow Romanized (left) and Chinese characters (center).

BUC version	Hanzi version	English version
Lièng-hăk-guók sié-gái ìng-guòng sŏng-ngiòng	聯合國世界人權宣言	Universal Declaration of Human Rights
Dâ̤-ék dèu	第一條	Article 1
Sū-iū nè̤ng sĕng giâ lì cêu sê cê̤ṳ-iù gì,	所有儂生下來就是自由其，	All human beings are born free
bêng-chiă diŏh cŏng-ngièng gâe̤ng guòng-lĭk siông ék-lŭk bìng-dēng.	並且著尊嚴共權利上一律平等。	and equal in dignity and rights.
Ĭ-gáuk-nè̤ng ô lī-séng gâe̤ng liòng-sĭng,	伊各儂有理性共良心，	They are endowed with reason and conscience
bêng-chiă éng-gāi ī hiăng-diê guăng-hiê gì cĭng-sìng lì hô-siŏng dó̤i-dâi.	並且應該以兄弟關係其精神來互相對待。	and should act towards one another in a spirit of brotherhood.

=== IPA ===
[tě.ěiʔ.téu]
[sū.jū.nø̂ŋ.séiŋ.kjǎ.lî.tsěu.sěi.tsø̌y.jú.kî,]
[pěiŋ.tsʰjá.tjóʔ.tsóuŋ.ŋjêŋ.kǎøŋ.kwôŋ.líʔ.sjǒŋ.ěiʔ.lúʔ.pîŋ.tēiŋ]
[í.kǎuʔ.nø̂ŋ.ǒu.lī.sèiŋ.kǎøŋ.ljôŋ.síŋ,]
[pěiŋ.tsʰjá.èiŋ.kāi.ī.hjáŋ.tjě.kwáŋ.hjě.kî.tsíŋ.lî.hǒu.sjóŋ.tòi.tài]

== Literary and art forms ==
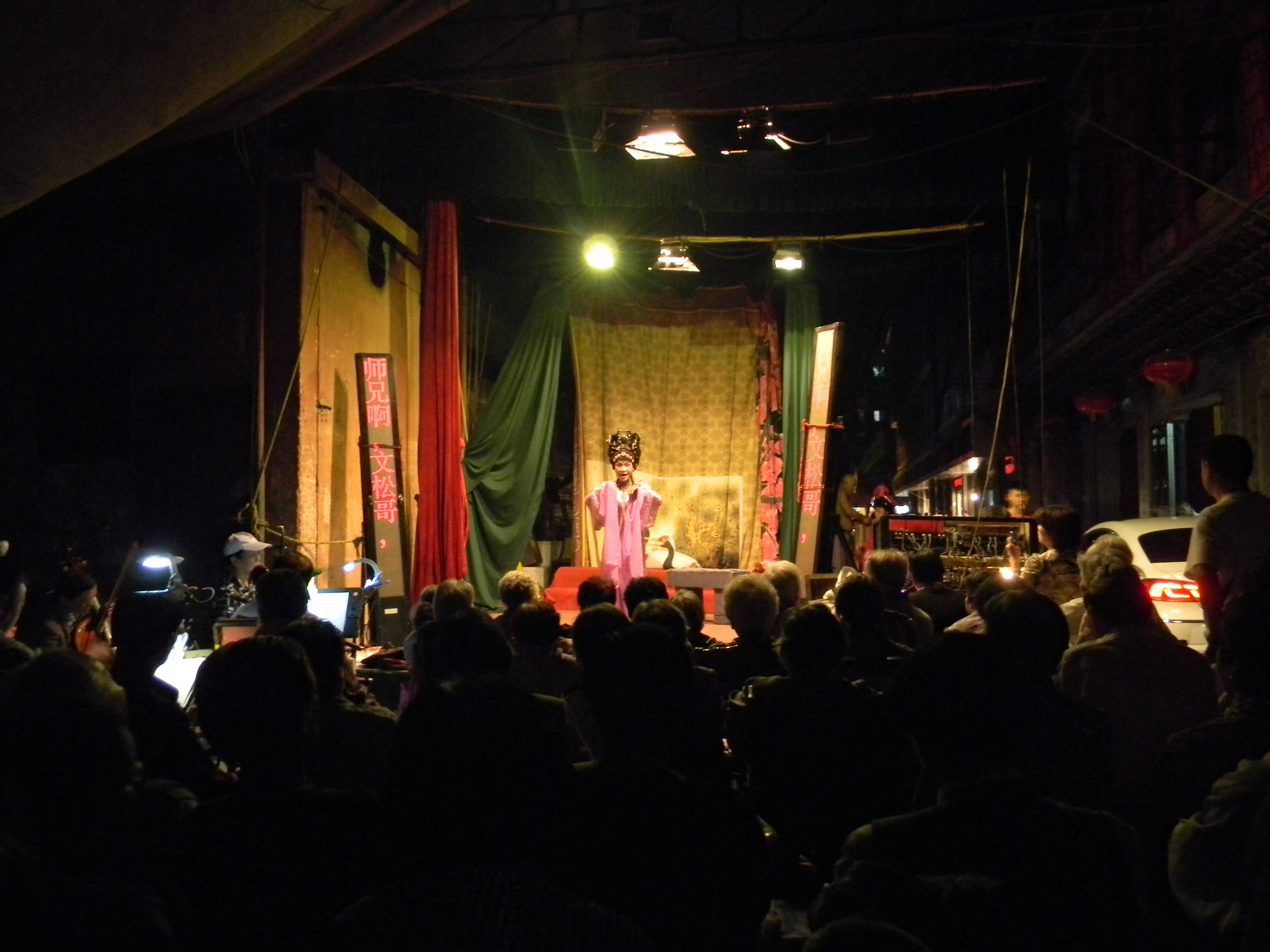
Min opera

Min opera (simplified Chinese: 闽剧; traditional Chinese: 閩劇; pinyin: Mǐnjù; Foochow Romanized: Mìng-kiŏk), also called Fuzhou drama (Chinese: 福州戲; pinyin: Fúzhōuxì; Pe̍h-ōe-jī: Hok-chiu-hì; Foochow Romanized: Hók-ciŭ-hié) or Fuzhou opera, is one of the major forms of traditional opera in Fujian Province. It enjoys great popularity in Fuzhou and surrounding regions in Fujian where the Fuzhou dialect is spoken, as well as in Taiwan and Indonesia, Malaysia, Singapore and Brunei. Min opera had been evolving for over 400 years before expanding greatly in the early twentieth century.

A variety of Min opera called Beilu opera (also called Luantan), is popular in the Eastern Min region of Shouning County, near Zhejiang.

== See also ==
- Fuzhou
- Fuzhou people
- Eastern Min
- Varieties of Chinese
- Fuqing dialect
- Chinatown, Brooklyn
- Chinatown, Flushing
- Chinatown, Manhattan
- Manhattan's Little Fuzhou
