= Fuzhou Transliteration Scheme =

The Fuzhou Transliteration Scheme (Chinese: 福州话拼音方案; pinyin: Fúzhōuhuà Pīnyīn Fāng'àn) refers to the romanization scheme published in 1994 for the Fuzhou Dialect Dictionary (Chinese: 福州方言词典; pinyin: Fúzhōu fāngyán cídiǎn), romanizing the Fuzhou dialect. It does not explicitly state the tones.

== Initials ==
As the Fuzhou dialect has two initial consonants that arise only after initial assimilation of other initials in certain phonological environments, there are two extra letters outside the standard initial tables.

Romanization	Example Character	IPA
b	邊	/p/
p	波	/pʰ/
m	蒙	/m/
d	低	/t/
t	他	/tʰ/
n	日	/n/
l	柳	/l/
g	求	/k/
k	氣	/kʰ/
ng	語	/ŋ/
h	喜	/h/
z	爭	/ts/
c	出	/tsʰ/
s	時	/s/
none	鶯	null initial
j	(香)蕉	/ʒ/
w	(罗)盆	/β/

== Finals ==
As the Fuzhou dialect exhibits the phenomenon of rime tensing with certain finals, the tense rime is presented first, with its lax equivalent after. Certain tense-lax distinctions present in the dialect are not transcribed in this transliteration scheme; others however are explicitly rendered.

Romanization	IPA
a	/a/~/ɑ/
ia	/ia/~/iɑ/
ua	/ua/~/uɑ/
e	/ɛ/
ie	/ie/~/iɛ/
o	/o/~/ɔ/
üo	/yo/~/yɔ/
uo	/uo/~/uɔ/
ë	/œ/
au	/au/~/ɑu/
eu	/ɛu/
iu / ieu	/iu/~/iɛu/
ëü / oü	/øy/~/ɔy/
ai	/ai/~/ɑi/
uai	/uai/~/uɑi/
ui / uoi	/ui/~/uoi/
i / ei	/i/~/ɛi/
u / ou	/u/~/ou/
ak	/aʔ/~/ɑʔ/
iak	/iaʔ/~/iɑʔ/
uak	/uaʔ/~/uɑʔ/
ek	/eʔ/~/ɛʔ/
iek	/ieʔ/~/iɛʔ/
ok	/oʔ/~/ɔʔ/
üok	/yoʔ/~/yɔʔ/
uok	/uoʔ/~/uɔʔ/
ëk	/øʔ/~/œʔ/
ang	/aŋ/~/ɑŋ/
iang	/iaŋ/~/iɑŋ/
uang	/uaŋ/~/uɑŋ/
ieng	/ieŋ/~/iɛŋ/
üong	/yoŋ/~/yɔŋ/
uong	/uoŋ/~/uɔŋ/
ing / eing	/iŋ/~/ɛiŋ/
ung / oung	/uŋ/~/ouŋ/
üng / ëüng	/yŋ/~/øyŋ/
eng / aing	/eiŋ/~/aiŋ/
ong / aung	/ouŋ/~/auŋ/
ëüng / oüng	/øyŋ/~/ɔyŋ/

== See also ==
- Fuzhou dialect
- Guangdong Romanization
