= Moses Clark White =

American missionary

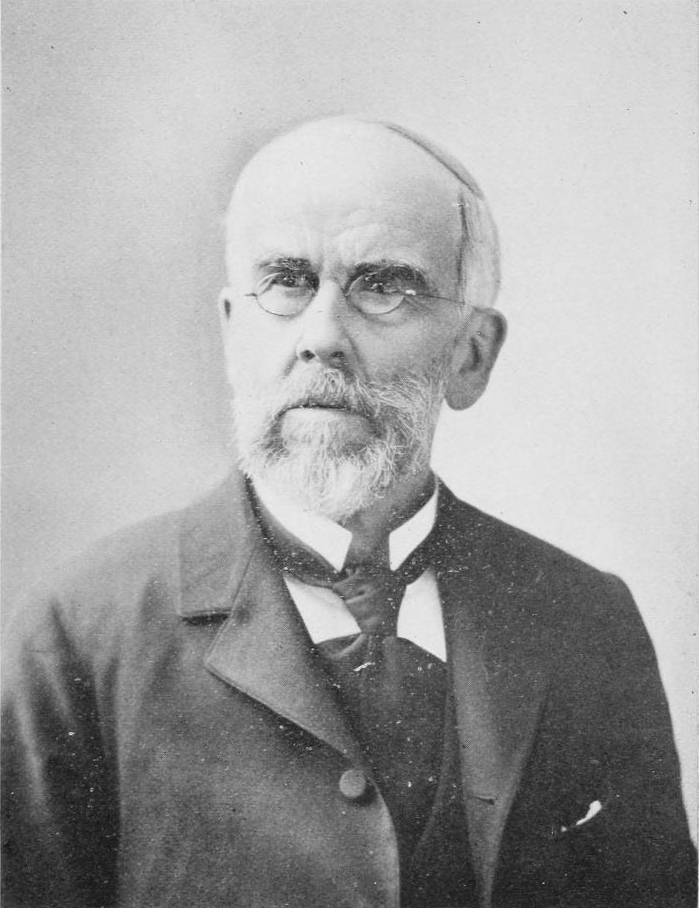
- Missionary to China
- Born: July 24, 1819; Paris, New York
- Died: October 24, 1900 (aged 81); New Haven, Connecticut

Moses Clark White (simplified Chinese: 怀德; traditional Chinese: 懷德; Pinyin: Huáidé; Foochow Romanized: Huài-dáik; July 24, 1819 – October 24, 1900) was both an American Methodist pioneer missionary in China and a physician.

== Life ==
Moses Clark White was born in Paris, Oneida County, New York on July 24, 1819. White matriculated at Wesleyan University in 1842 and graduated in 1845. After graduation from Wesleyan, he spent two years in Yale studying medicine and theology, and sometimes preached in the nearby town of Milford, Connecticut. On March 13, 1847, White married Jane Isabel Atwater of Homer, who came from Cortland County, New York and was then a teacher in the Sabbath School in Rochester, N.Y.

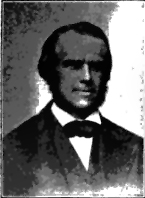
M.C. White, ca. 1849

In September 1847 Moses White and Jane, along with Judson Dwight Collins, arrived in Fuzhou, beginning their missionary work there. Jane, however, fell sick shortly afterwards and finally died of consumption on May 25, 1848, at the age of 26. In 1851, White was married a second time to Mary Seely, who came from Onondaga, New York and also went to Fuzhou as a missionary.

During his seven years in Fuzhou, Moses White conducted a school for the secular and religious instruction of the Fuzhounese people, and after mastering the local Fuzhou dialect, he translated the Gospel of Matthew, which was the first Christian document ever published in that vernacular. At the same time, White also served as a doctor, studying and treating the toxic effects of opium.

Due to his poor health, Moses White was forced to leave Fuzhou in 1853 for New Haven (his wife Mary also left one year earlier) where he resumed medical studies at Yale and began a medical practice which he continued until the end of his life. He received an M.D. degree from Yale in 1854. In July 1856, he published in Methodist Quarterly Review his summarizing treatise on Fuzhou dialect The Chinese Language Spoken at Fuh Chau.

White died on October 24, 1900.
