= Yongtai County =

Yongtai 永泰县 Yungtai
- County
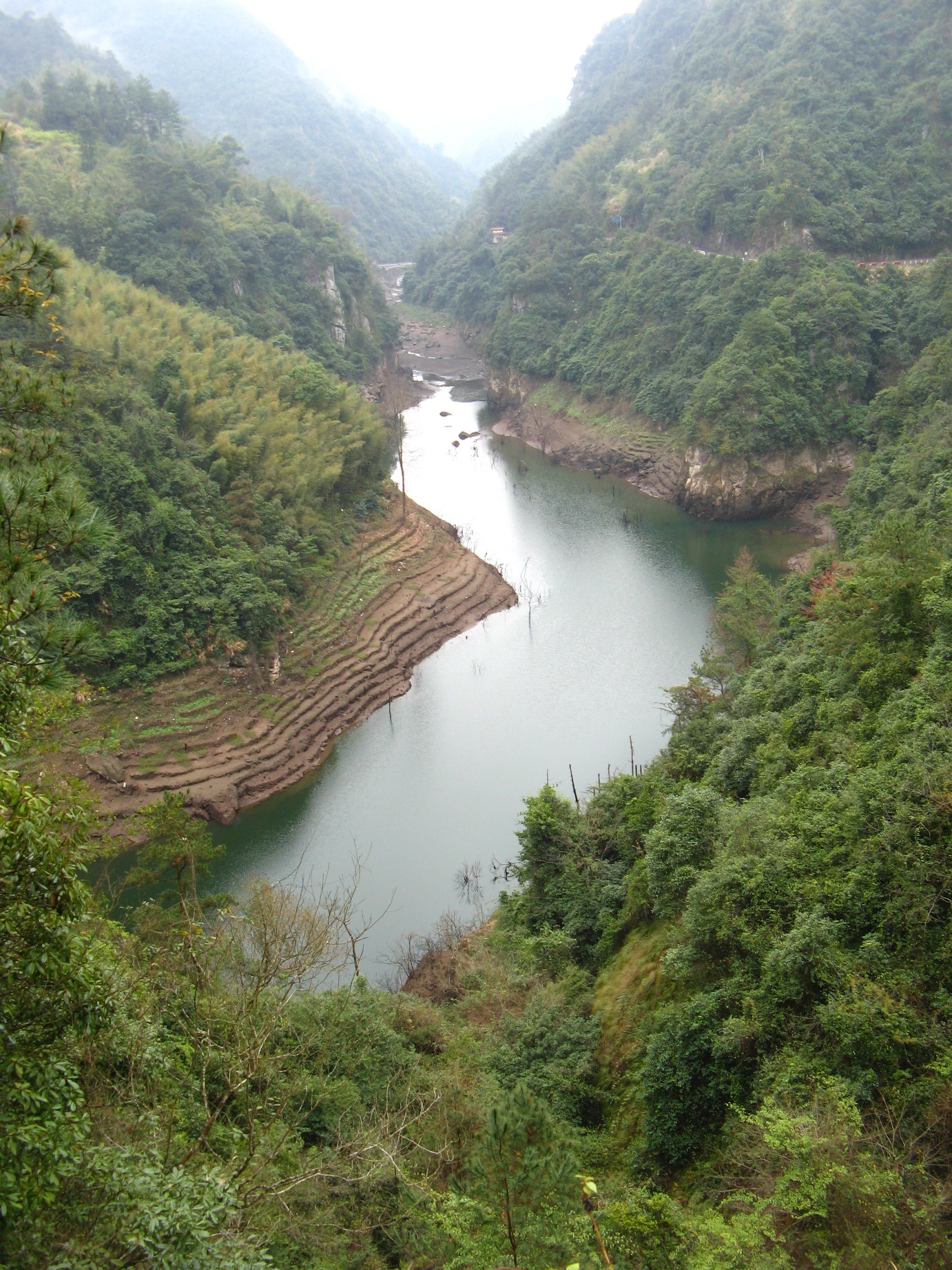

- Location in Fujian
- Coordinates: 25°54′N 118°56′E
- Country: People's Republic of China
- Province: Fujian
- Prefecture-level city: Fuzhou
- Time zone: UTC+8 (China Standard)

Yongtai County (Chinese: 永泰; pinyin: Yǒngtài; Foochow Romanized: Īng-tái) is a county of Fujian Province, China. It is under the administration of the prefecture-level city of Fuzhou, the provincial capital.

== Transportation ==
- Yongtai Station on the Xiangtang–Putian Railway, a junction of the railways two branches (one runs north to Fuzhou, the other south to Putian). A large portion of the railway trackage within the county is in tunnels.

== Climate ==
Climate data for Yongtai, elevation 86 m (282 ft), (1991–2020 normals, extremes 1981–present)
Month	Jan	Feb	Mar	Apr	May	Jun	Jul	Aug	Sep	Oct	Nov	Dec	Year
Record high °C (°F)	31.0 (87.8)	34.4 (93.9)	34.1 (93.4)	35.8 (96.4)	39.1 (102.4)	39.1 (102.4)	42.0 (107.6)	40.1 (104.2)	39.2 (102.6)	37.0 (98.6)	35.8 (96.4)	30.5 (86.9)	42.0 (107.6)
Mean daily maximum °C (°F)	16.4 (61.5)	17.8 (64.0)	20.7 (69.3)	25.5 (77.9)	28.8 (83.8)	32.0 (89.6)	35.0 (95.0)	34.1 (93.4)	31.3 (88.3)	27.1 (80.8)	22.9 (73.2)	18.3 (64.9)	25.8 (78.5)
Daily mean °C (°F)	11.2 (52.2)	12.3 (54.1)	14.9 (58.8)	19.5 (67.1)	23.2 (73.8)	26.6 (79.9)	28.8 (83.8)	28.1 (82.6)	26.0 (78.8)	21.7 (71.1)	17.7 (63.9)	13.0 (55.4)	20.2 (68.5)
Mean daily minimum °C (°F)	7.8 (46.0)	8.7 (47.7)	11.0 (51.8)	15.2 (59.4)	19.4 (66.9)	22.9 (73.2)	24.5 (76.1)	24.3 (75.7)	22.3 (72.1)	17.8 (64.0)	14.1 (57.4)	9.4 (48.9)	16.5 (61.6)
Record low °C (°F)	−2.6 (27.3)	−1.8 (28.8)	−2.5 (27.5)	4.2 (39.6)	7.6 (45.7)	12.3 (54.1)	19.8 (67.6)	19.2 (66.6)	13.0 (55.4)	6.4 (43.5)	0.7 (33.3)	−4.8 (23.4)	−4.8 (23.4)
Average precipitation mm (inches)	55.0 (2.17)	77.2 (3.04)	122.2 (4.81)	143.9 (5.67)	218.0 (8.58)	243.2 (9.57)	179.3 (7.06)	211.1 (8.31)	128.8 (5.07)	55.3 (2.18)	48.7 (1.92)	43.3 (1.70)	1,526 (60.08)
Average precipitation days (≥ 0.1 mm)	9.2	12.2	16.3	15.1	17.7	16.5	12.6	16.3	12.3	6.8	8.6	8.4	152
Average snowy days	0	0.1	0	0	0	0	0	0	0	0	0	0.1	0.2
Average relative humidity (%)	76	77	77	76	79	81	77	79	78	75	77	76	77
Mean monthly sunshine hours	103.1	96.9	110.8	128.9	137.0	147.8	223.8	192.1	159.4	150.6	114.9	111.7	1,677
Percentage possible sunshine	31	30	30	34	33	36	54	48	43	43	36	34	38
Source: China Meteorological AdministrationAll-time May highall-time extreme temperature

== Administrative divisions ==
Towns:

- Zhangcheng (樟城镇), Songkou (嵩口镇), Wutong (梧桐镇), Geling (葛岭镇), Chengfeng (城峰镇), Qingliang (清凉镇), Changqing (长庆镇), Tong'an (同安镇), Dayang (大洋镇)

Townships:

- Tangqian Township (塘前乡), Fuquan Township (富泉乡), Linglu Township (岭路乡), Chixi Township (赤锡乡), Fukou Township (洑口乡), Gaiyang Township (盖洋乡), Dongyang Township (东洋乡), Xiaba Township (霞拔乡), Pangu Township (盘谷乡), Hongxing Township (红星乡), Baiyun Township (白云乡), Danyun Township (丹云乡)
