= Gu Kuang =

Tang dynasty poet

Gu Kuang (顧況) (fl. 757) was a Tang dynasty poet.

== Biography ==
Gu Kuang was born around 727.

He died around 816.

== Works cited ==
- Ueki, Hisayuki; Uno, Naoto; Matsubara, Akira (1999). "Shijin to Shi no Shōgai (Ko Kyō)". In Matsuura, Tomohisa (ed.). Kanshi no Jiten 漢詩の事典 (in Japanese). Tokyo: Taishūkan Shoten. p. 109. OCLC 41025662.
