= Bàng-uâ-cê =

Romanization system of the Fuzhou dialect of Eastern Min

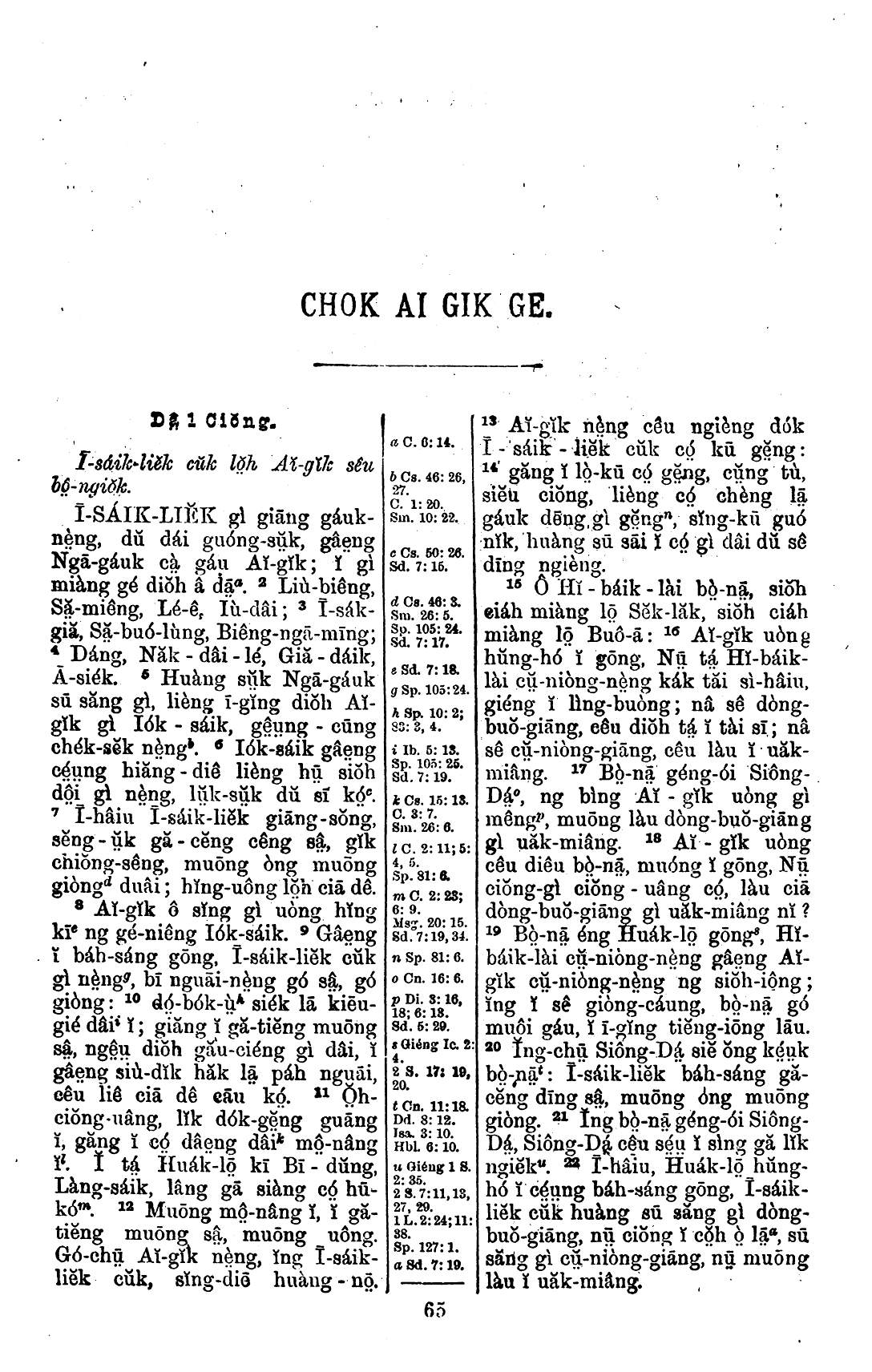
- The Book of Exodus in Bàng-uâ-cê, published by the British and Foreign Bible Society
- Script type: Latin alphabet (modified)
- Creator: Moses Clark White, Robert Samuel Maclay, Caleb Cook Baldwin, Robert Stewart
- Period: late 19th century – ?
- Languages: Fuzhou dialect of the Eastern Min language

Related scripts
- Child systems: Hinghwa Romanized, Kienning Colloquial Romanized

Bàng-uâ-cê (abbr. BUC; Chinese: 平話字) or Fuzhou romanization (福州話羅馬字), is a Latin alphabet for the Fuzhou dialect of Eastern Min adopted in the middle of the 19th century by Western missionaries. It had varied at different times, and became standardized in the 1890s. Bàng-uâ-cê was mainly used inside of church circles, and was taught in some mission schools in Fuzhou. However, unlike its counterpart Pe̍h-ōe-jī for Hokkien, even in its prime days Bàng-uâ-cê was by no means universally understood by Christians.

== History ==
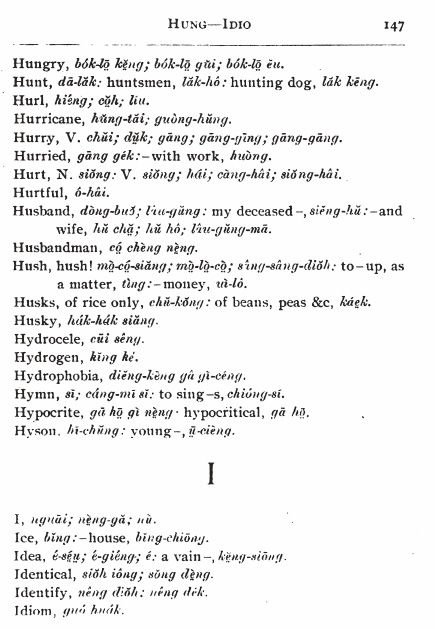
An English-Chinese Dictionary of the Foochow Dialect, 2nd Edition, published in 1905

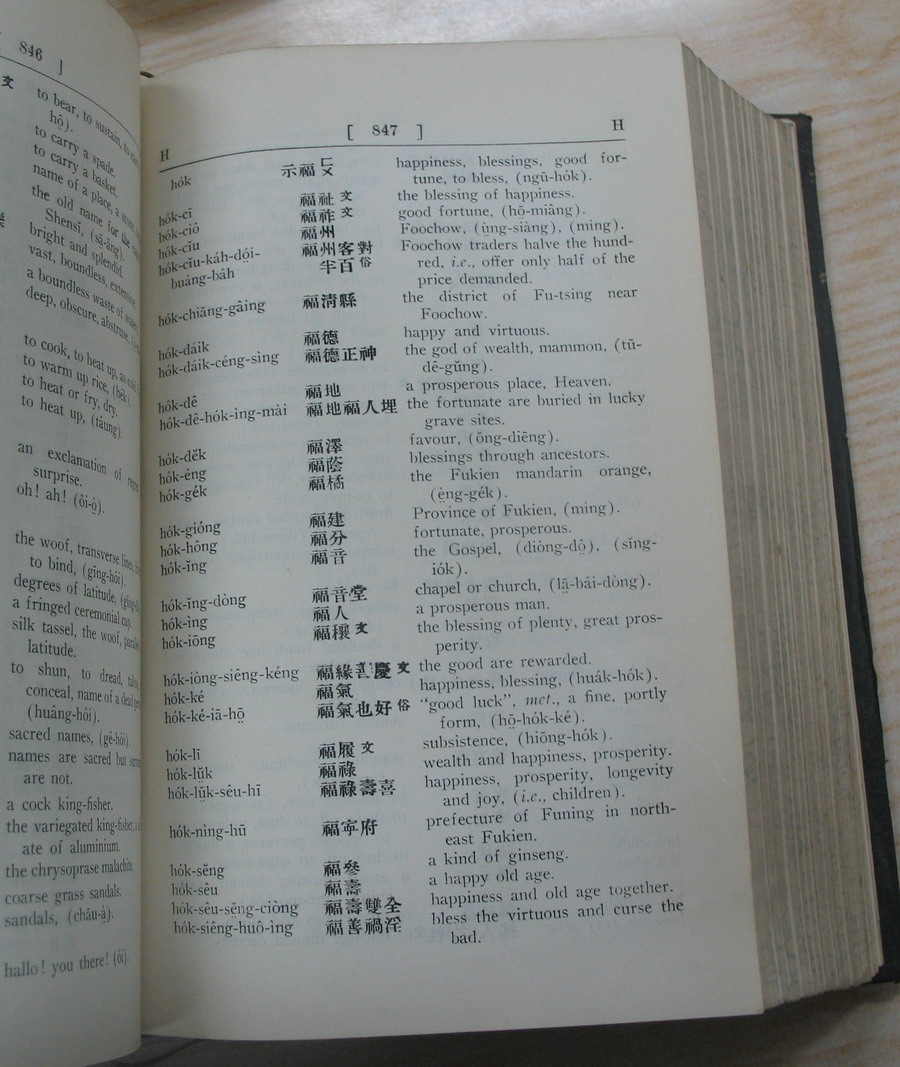
Dictionary of the Foochow dialect, 3rd Edition, published in 1929

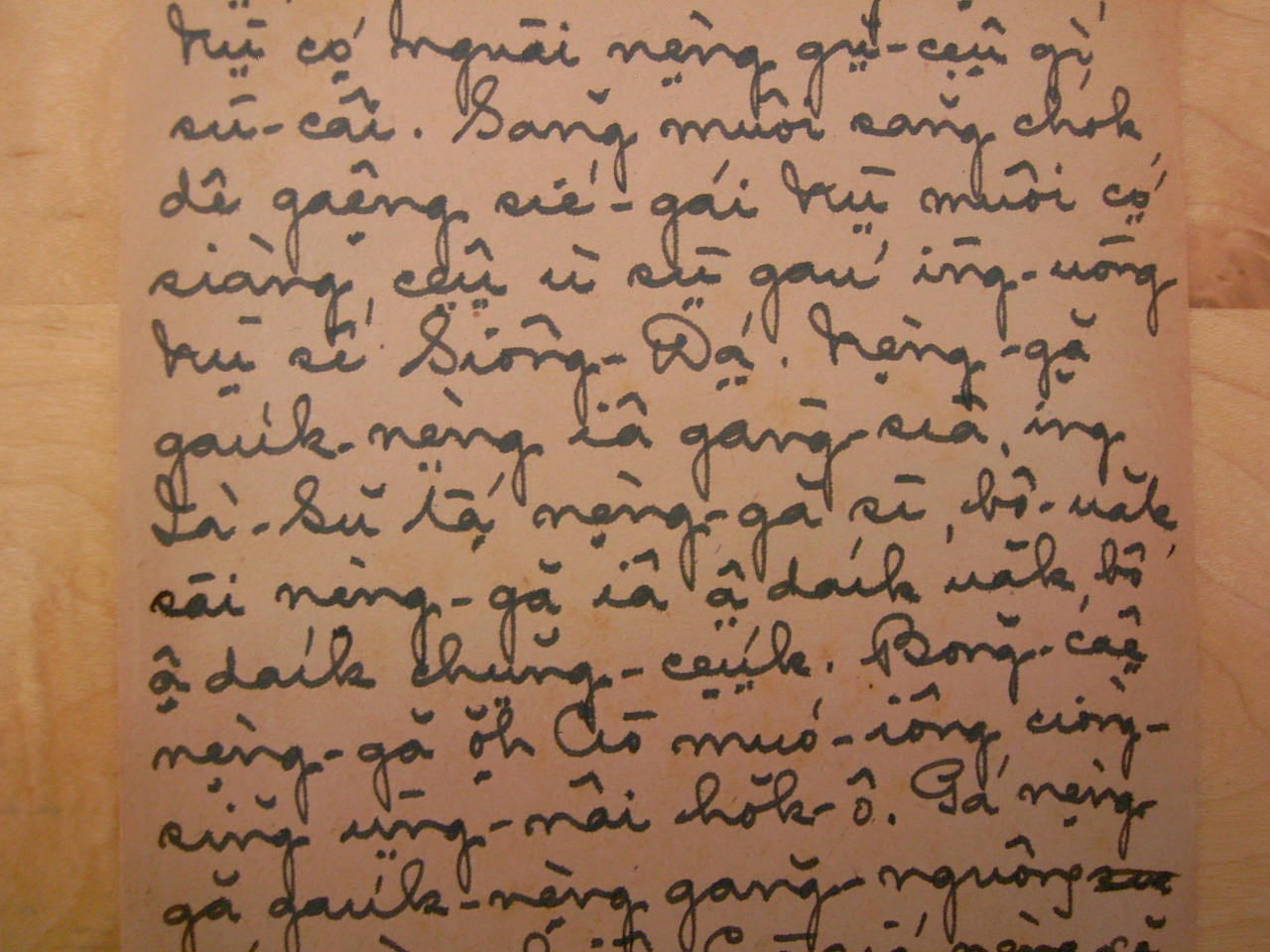
Hand-written note in Bàng-uâ-cê, ca. 1910. It reads: "...You are our dwelling place. Before the mountains were born or you brought forth the earth and the world, from everlasting to everlasting you are God. And we are thankful, because Jesus died for us, resurrected, and enabled us to live in the life full of abundance. He helps us conform to the image of the Lord, and be patient and serve Him with all our heart. He teaches us to willingly forgive people..."

After Fuzhou became one of the five Chinese treaty ports opened by the Treaty of Nanjing at the end of First Opium War (from 1839 to 1842), many Western missionaries arrived in the city. Faced with widespread illiteracy, they developed Latin alphabets for the Fuzhou dialect.

The first attempt in romanizing the Fuzhou dialect was made by the American Methodist M. C. White, who borrowed a system of orthography known as the System of Sir William Jones. In this system, 14 initials were designed exactly according to their voicing and aspiration. ⟨p⟩, ⟨t⟩, ⟨k⟩ and ⟨ch⟩ stand for [p], [t], [k] and [ts]; while the Greek spiritus lenis ⟨᾿⟩ were affixed to the above initials to represent their aspirated counterparts. Besides the default five vowels of Latin alphabet, four diacritic-marked letters ⟨è⟩, ⟨ë⟩, ⟨ò⟩ and ⟨ü⟩ were also introduced, representing [ɛ], [ø], [ɔ], and [y], respectively. This system is described at length in White's linguistic work The Chinese Language Spoken at Fuh Chau.

Subsequent missionaries, including Robert S. Maclay from American Methodist Episcopal Mission, R. W. Stewart from the Church of England and Charles Hartwell from the American Board Mission, further modified White's system in several ways. The most significant change was made for the plosive consonants, where the spiritus lenis ⟨᾿⟩ of the aspirated initials was removed and the letters ⟨b⟩, ⟨d⟩ and ⟨g⟩ substituted for [p] [t] and [k]. In the aspect of vowels, ⟨è⟩, ⟨ë⟩, ⟨ò⟩ and ⟨ü⟩ were replaced by ⟨a̤⟩, ⟨e̤⟩, ⟨o̤⟩ and ⟨ṳ⟩. Since the diacritical marks were all shifted to underneath the vowels, this left room above the vowels which was occupied by the newly introduced tonal marks. Thus Bàng-uâ-cê avoids the potentially awkward diacritic stacking seen for instance in the Vietnamese script, where tone and vowel quality marks both sit above the vowel.

== Alphabet ==
The sample characters are taken from the Qi Lin Bayin, a renowned phonology book about the Fuzhou dialect written in the Qing Dynasty. The pronunciations are recorded in standard IPA symbols.

=== Initials ===
| BUC | Sample character | Pronunciation |
| b | 邊 | /p/ |
| p | 波 | /pʰ/ |
| m | 蒙 | /m/ |
| d | 低 | /t/ |
| t | 他 | /tʰ/ |
| n | 日 | /n/ |
| l | 柳 | /l/ |
| g | 求 | /k/ |
| k | 氣 | /kʰ/ |
| ng | 語 | /ŋ/ |
| h | 喜 | /h/ |
| c | 爭 | /ts/ |
| ch | 出 | /tsʰ/ |
| s | 時 | /s/ |
| None | 鶯 | Null Initial |

=== Finals ===
==== Finals without codas ====
| BUC | Sample character | Traditional pronunciation | Modern pronunciation |
| a | 嘉 | /a/ | /a/ |
| ia | 奇 | /ia/ | /ia/ |
| ua | 花 | /ua/ | /ua/ |
| a̤ | 西 | /ɛ/ | /e/ or /a/ |
| ie | 雞 | /ie/ | /ie/ |
| o̤ | 歌 | /ɔ/ | /o/ or /ɔ/ |
| io | 橋 | /io/ | /yo/ |
| uo | 過 | /uo/ | /uo/ |
| e̤ / ae̤ | 初 | /ø/ or /aø/ | /ø/ or /ɔ/ |
| au | 郊 | /au/ | /au/ |
| eu / aiu | 溝 | /eu/ or /aiu/ | /eu/ or /au/ |
| ieu | 燒 | /ieu/ | /iu/ |
| iu / eu | 秋 | /iu/ or /eu/ | /iu/ |
| oi / o̤i | 催 | /oi/ or /ɔi/ | /øy/ or /ɔy/ |
| ai | 開 | /ai/ | /ai/ |
| uai | 歪 | /uai/ | /uai/ |
| uoi | 杯 | /uoi/ | /ui/ |
| ui / oi | 輝 | /ui/ or /oi/ | /ui/ |
| i / e | 之 | /i/ or /ei/ | /i/ or /ɛi/ |
| u / o | 孤 | /u/ or /ou/ | /u/ or /ɔu/ |
| ṳ / e̤ṳ | 須 | /y/ or /øy/ | /y/ or /œy/ |

==== Finals with coda [ʔ] ====
| BUC | Traditional pronunciation | Modern pronunciation |
| ah | /aʔ/ | /aʔ/ |
| iah | /iaʔ/ | /iaʔ/ |
| uah | /uaʔ/ | /uaʔ/ |
| a̤h | /ɛʔ/ | /eʔ/ |
| ieh | /ieʔ/ | /ieʔ/ |
| o̤h | /ɔʔ/ | /oʔ/ or /ɔʔ/ |
| ioh | /ioʔ/ | /yoʔ/ |
| uoh | /uoʔ/ | /uoʔ/ |
| e̤h | /øʔ/ | /øʔ/ |

==== Finals with codas [-ŋ] and [-k] ====
| BUC | Sample character | Traditional pronunciation | Modern pronunciation |
| ang | 山 | /aŋ/ | /aŋ/ |
| iang | 聲 | /iaŋ/ | /iaŋ/ |
| uang | 歡 | /uaŋ/ | /uaŋ/ |
| ieng | 天 | /ieŋ/ | /ieŋ/ |
| iong | 香 | /ioŋ/ | /yoŋ/ |
| uong | 光 | /uoŋ/ | /uoŋ/ |
| ing / eng | 賓 | /iŋ/ or /eiŋ/ | /iŋ/ or /ɛiŋ/ |
| ung / ong | 春 | /uŋ/ or /ouŋ/ | /uŋ/ or /ɔuŋ/ |
| ṳng / e̤ṳng | 銀 | /yŋ/ or /øyŋ/ | /yŋ/ or /œyŋ/ |
| eng / aing | 燈 | /eiŋ/ or /aiŋ/ | /eiŋ/ or /aiŋ/ |
| ong / aung | 釭 | /ouŋ/ or /auŋ/ | /ouŋ/ or /ɔuŋ/ |
| e̤ng / ae̤ng | 東 | /øŋ/ or /aøŋ/ | /øyŋ/ or /ɔyŋ/ |

=== Tones ===
| Name | Tone numeral | BUC symbol | Example |
| Shàngpíng (上平, BUC: Siông-bìng) | 55 | ◌̆ | 君 Gŭng |
| Shǎngshēng (上聲, BUC: Siōng-siăng) | 33 | ◌̄ | 滾 Gūng |
| Shàngqù (上去, BUC: Siông-ké̤ṳ) | 213 | ◌́ | 貢 Góng |
| Shàngrù (上入, BUC: Siông-ĭk) | 24 | ◌́ | 谷 Gók |
| Xiàpíng (下平, BUC: Hâ-bìng) | 53 | ◌̀ | 群 Gùng |
| Xiàqù (下去, BUC: Hâ-ké̤ṳ) | 242 | ◌̂ | 郡 Gông |
| Xiàrù (下入, BUC: Hâ-ĭk) | 5 | ◌̆ | 掘 Gŭk |

Note that Bàng-uâ-cê uses the breve, not the caron (ˇ), to indicate Yīnpíng and Yángrù tones of Fuzhou dialect.

== Sample text ==
| Original | | IPA | Translation | Audio |
| Bàng-uâ-cê | Characters | IPA | Translation | Audio |
|---|---|---|---|---|
| Báe̤k-hŭng gâe̤ng Nĭk-tàu | 《北風共日頭》 | [pàøʔ.húŋ kǎøŋ níʔ.tʰâu] | The North Wind and the Sun |
| Ô sŏ̤h huòi, Báe̤k-hŭng gâe̤ng Nĭk-tàu duŏh hī dó̤i căng, káng diê-nè̤ng buōng-sê̤ṳ duâi. | 有蜀回，北風共日頭著許塊爭，看底儂本事大。 | [ǒu sóʔ hwôi, pàøʔ.húŋ kǎøŋ níʔ.tʰâu twóʔ hī tòi tsáŋ, kʰàŋ tjě.nø̂ŋ pwōŋ.sø̌y twǎi] | Once upon a time, the North Wind and the Sun were disputing which was stronger. |
| Căng lì căng kó̤ mò̤ suŏ iàng. | 爭來爭去無輸贏。 | [tsáŋ lî tsáŋ kʰǒ mô swó jâŋ] | They disputed on and on without reaching a conclusion. |
| Ciā sèng-hâiu, duô lā̤ ô sŏ̤h ciéh nè̤ng giàng lā̤, sĭng lā̤ sê̤ṳng duŏh sŏ̤h iông gâu-gâu gì duâi-ĭ. | 者辰候，墿𡅏有蜀隻儂行𡅏，身𡅏頌著蜀件厚厚其大衣。 | [tsjá sêiŋ.hǎjǔ, twǒ lē ǒu sóʔ tsjěʔ nø̂ŋ kjâŋ lē, síŋ lē sø̌yŋ twóʔ sóʔ jǒŋ kǎu.kǎu kî twǎi.í] | Just at that moment, there was a man walking along the road, wearing a very heavy coat. |
| Ĭ lâng ciéh gōng hō̤, diê-nè̤ng ô buōng-sê̤ṳ sĕng gáe̤ cī ciéh nè̤ng gâe̤ng duâi-ĭ táung lâi gó̤, cêu sáung diê-nè̤ng buōng-sê̤ṳ duâi. | 伊兩隻講好，底儂有本事先告玆隻儂共大衣褪唻去，就算底儂本事大。 | [í jǎŋ tsjěʔ kóuŋ hó, tjě.nø̂ŋ ǒu pwōŋ.sø̌y séiŋ kàø tsī tsjěʔ nø̂ŋ kǎøŋ twǎi.í tʰàuŋ lǎi kò, tsěu sàuŋ tjě.nø̂ŋ pwōŋ.sø̌y twǎi] | The two agreed that who first succeeded in making this man take his coat off should be considered stronger. |
| Dăng nĭ, Báe̤k-hŭng cêu sāi lĭk sī-miâng dék chuŏi, bók-guó ĭ muōng chuŏi dék lê-hâi, cī ciéh lā̤ giàng-duô gì nè̤ng cêu ciŏng hī iông duâi-ĭ muōng bău muōng gīng gó̤. | 仱呢，北風就使力死命的吹，不過伊罔吹的利害，玆隻𡅏行墿其儂就將許件大衣罔包罔緊去。 | [táŋ ní, pàøʔ.húŋ tsěu sāi líʔ sī.mjǎŋ tèiʔ tsʰwói, pòuʔ.kwò í mwōŋ tsʰwói těiʔ lěi.hǎi, tsī tsjěʔ lē kjáŋ-twǒ kî nø̌ŋ tsěu tsjóŋ hī jǒŋ twǎi.í mwōŋ páu mwōŋ kīŋ kò] | Then, the North Wind exerted all his strength to blow, but the harder he blew, the tighter that walking man wrapped his coat. |
| Gáu muōi-hâiu, Báe̤k-hŭng mò̤ bâing-huák, cêu cūng-kuāng láe̤k gó̤. | 遘尾後，北風無辦法，就總款〇去。 | [kàu mwōi.hǎjǔ, pàøʔ.húŋ mó pǎiŋ.hwǎʔ, tsěu tsūŋ.kʰwāŋ lǎøʔ kò] | At last, the North Wind was at his wits' end, so he gave up. |
| Guó nék-òng, Nĭk-tàu chók lì. | 過仂暅，日頭出來。 | [kwò něiʔ.óuŋ, níʔ.tʰâu tsʰǒuʔ lî] | After a while, the Sun came out. |
| Iĕk-pĕ̤-pĕ̤ sāi sāi lĭk sŏ̤h puŏh, hī ciéh lā̤ giàng-duô gì nè̤ng ché̤ṳk-káik cêu ciŏng hī iông duâi-ĭ táung lŏ̤h lì. | 熱〇〇使使力蜀曝，許隻𡅏行墿其儂〇刻就將許件大衣褪落來。 | [jéʔ.pʰǿ.pʰǿ sāi sāi líʔ sóʔ pʰwóʔ, hī tsjěʔ lē kjâŋ twǒ kî nø̂ŋ tsʰø̌yʔ-kʰǎiʔ tsěu tsjóŋ hī jǒŋ twǎi.í tʰàuŋ lóʔ lî] | He shined out forcibly with a sweltering heat, and immediately that walking man took off his coat. |
| Cī-hâ Báe̤k-hŭng cêu nâ diông sìng-nêng, lâng gá nè̤ng diē-sié, gó sê Nĭk-tàu gì buōng-sê̤ṳ duâi. | 玆下北風就僅長承認，兩個儂底勢，故是日頭其本事大。 | [tsī.hǎ pàøʔ.húŋ tsěu nǎ tjǒŋ sîŋ.něiŋ, lǎŋ kà nø̂ŋ tjē-sjè, kòu sěi níʔ.tʰâu lî pwōŋ.sø̌y twǎi] | And so the North Wind had no choice but to confess that the Sun was stronger of the two. |
