= Fuzhou people =

East Asian ethnic group

Fuzhounese people
福州人; 福州儂 (Hók-ciŭ-nè̤ng); 福州十邑儂
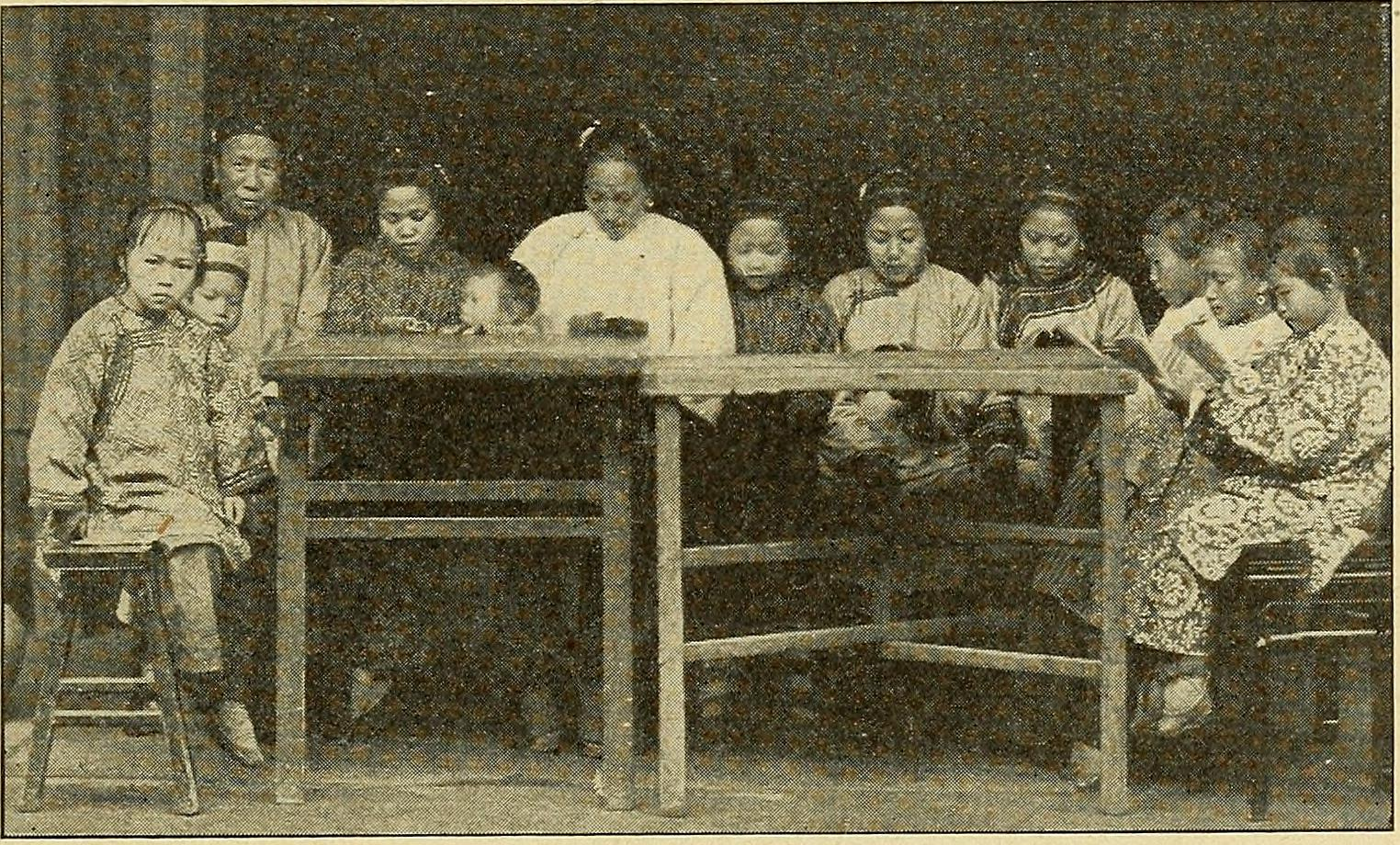
- Hockchew women in Bible Women's Training School during a women's class in Fuzhou, 1873.

Total population
- 10,000,000

Regions with significant populations
- China; Taiwan; Japan; United States (New York City); Australia; Canada; Malaysia (Sibu, Yong Peng, Sitiawan)

Languages
- Standard Chinese, Fuzhou dialect (prestige), Gutian dialect, Ningde dialect, Fuqing dialect

Religion
- Atheism, Chinese folk religions (including Taoism, Confucianism, ancestral worship and others), Chinese Buddhism, Christianity, Chinese Manichaeism and non-religious

Related ethnic groups
- Fuzhou Americans, Minbei people, Putian people, Fuzhou Tanka, other Chinese people

Fuzhou people (Note: Foochowese, Hokchew, Hokchia, Hokchiu, Fuzhou Shiyi people (福州十邑人), Eastern Min, or Mindong) (Chinese: 福州人; pinyin: Fúzhōu rén; Fuzhou romanization: Hók-ciŭ-nè̤ng) are a subgroup of Han Chinese of either Fuzhou and Mindong regions and the Gutian and Pingnan counties of Fujian province and Matsu Islands in Taiwan. Fuzhou people are a part of the Min Chinese-speaking group that speaks Eastern Min or specifically Fuzhou dialect. There is also a significant overseas Fuzhou population, particularly distributed in Japan, United States (Fuzhou Americans), Canada, Australia, New Zealand, Malaysia, Indonesia and the United Kingdom.

Native location of Fuzhounese people—includes Gutian County and Pingnan County which are unrepresented in this map.

== Language ==
Fuzhou dialect is a tonal language that has extensive sandhi rules in the initials, rimes, and tones. These complicated rules make Fuzhou dialect one of the most difficult Chinese varieties.

=== Dialects ===
List of dialects of the Fuzhou language (福州話的方言):

- Min county dialect (prestige) – Fuzhou and Minhou county
- Gutian dialect
- Ningde dialect
- Changle dialect
- Fuqing dialect, includes Pingtan Island and parts of Changle
- Matsu dialect
- Minqing dialect 福州閩清話 - Minqing county

== City history ==
Fuzhou throughout the 1800s had many missionaries from the West coming in and out of the city. The lack of communication between government officials and local town people led to uproar among local residence regarding missionaries. Although around 1850 five major ports were allowing foreigners to reside temporarily for missionary work, Fuzhounese people believed only their city was allowing this. Fuzhou natives were against missionaries as well as confronting Europeans in regards to business arrangements. At the same time Fuzhou had missionaries present, other cities such as Guangzhou started rebelling against foreigners. While Daoist people as well as monks showed hospitality towards missionaries unlike most other residents. Following the lead of Guangzhou people, Fuzhounese natives soon also rebelled. Miscommunication was a large part of misunderstanding by Fuzhounese people. During the 1800s there were five port cities that were of interest of Europeans. Shanghai and Ningbo in addition of Fuzhou, were also allowing residency for missionaries during this time. The western powers felt similar resentment towards China as China did on the West.

== Education and technology ==
Throughout the Ming and Qing dynasties, local lineages were of high importance. The success rate regarding education throughout Fuzhou was often linked to the lineage members. As part of a lineage, it was the responsibility of a community to ensure successful education occurred. Education began as a private matter and not regulated throughout different lineages. The ability for a lineage to teach the fundamentals would determine people's later success with imperial examinations given throughout much of China. Shu-yuan were considered highly educated people who succeeded on given examinations. Many of these shu-yuan, around eighteen, were associated with Fuzhou fu throughout Ming and Qing dynasty. Some of the eighteen may have been from Song dynasty. However, there is less evidence to back up those claims.

Although over time southeastern Fujian Province is more developed in terms of technology and resources, Fujian decided on the capital Fuzhou which is in North Fujian. Fujian has had a lower rate of urbanization in comparison to China as a whole. As a result, in provinces such as Fuzhou, the locals tend to be behind on methods in regards to agriculture and technological advancements. Fujian is rich in their ability to fish due to their location along the coastline. Fuzhou can not only participate in fishing itself but also the transporting of goods along the sea. Due to the richness of resources, the desire for migration to Fuzhou is high. As a result, people desiring to move to Fuzhou must have high education levels as well as skills necessary to contribute to the society.

== Emigration and diaspora ==
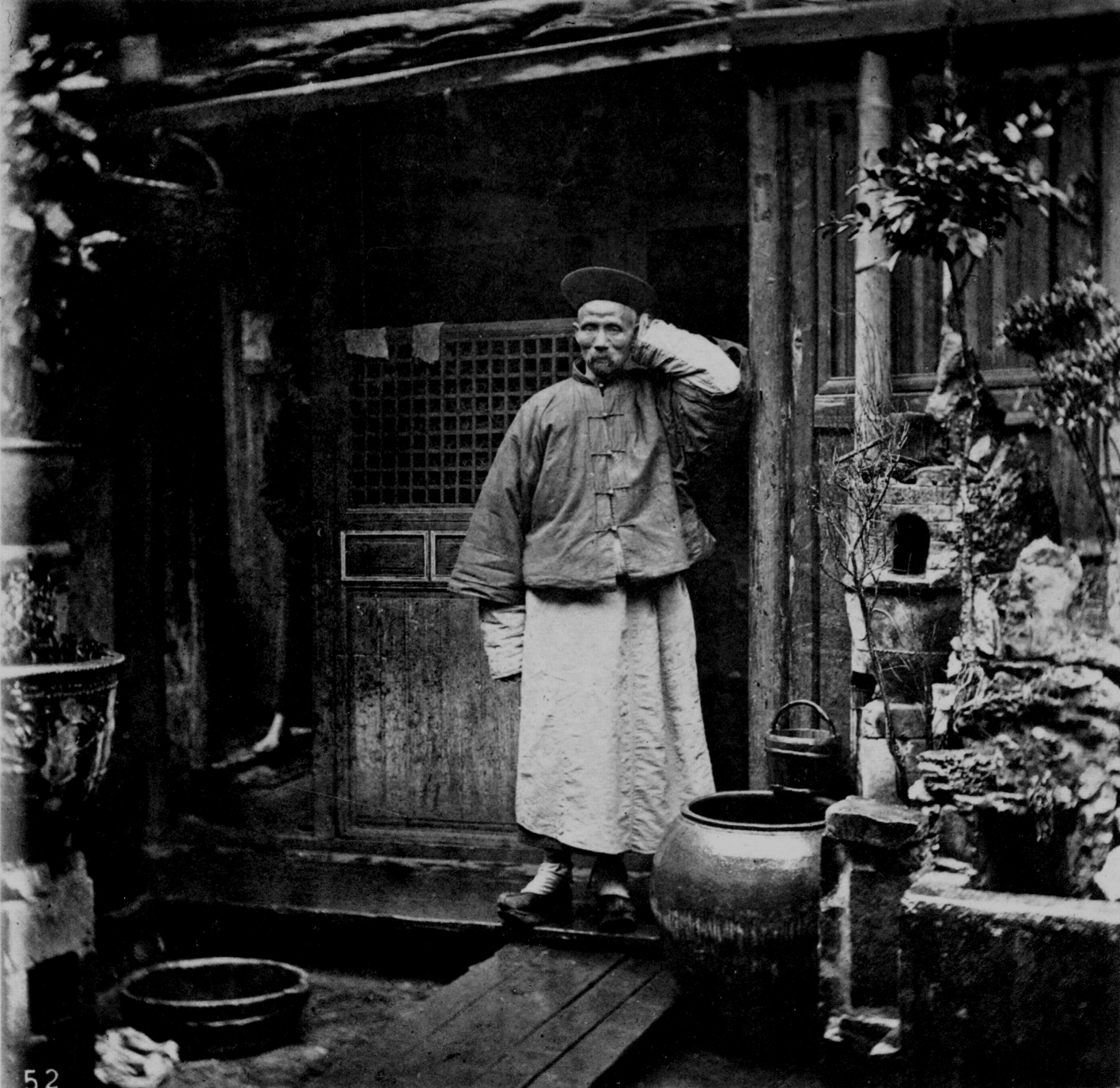
A native Fuzhou detective in 1898

=== History ===
Fuzhou's history of emigration began since the Ming dynasty with Zheng He's voyages overseas. As the result of immigration of Fuzhounese to Southeast Asia, Fuzhou dialect is found in Malaysia and Indonesia. The city of Sibu of Malaysia is called "New Fuzhou" due to a significant wave of Fuzhounese immigration in the early 1900s. They are referred to as "Hockchiu" or "Hokchew" in Malaysia and Singapore and "Hokchia" in Indonesia.

=== Japan ===
Some Fuzhou people have moved to Japan. Conversely, many Japanese have historically been interested in Fuzhou language. During the Second World War, some Japanese scholars became passionate about studying Fuzhou dialect, believing that it could be beneficial to the rule of the Greater East Asia Co-Prosperity Sphere. One of their most famous works was the Japanese-Chinese Translation: Fuzhou Dialect (日華對譯: 福州語) published in 1940 in Taipei, in which katakana was used to represent Fuzhou pronunciation.

=== Southeast Asia ===
The Hockchius and Hockchias migrated to Nanyang (South-East Asia) in much smaller numbers compared to the Hokkien, Chaoshanese, Cantonese, Hakkas and Hainanese peoples, but achieved remarkable success. Amongst others, Robert Kuok (Hockchiu) rose to become the "Sugar King" of Malaysia and is currently ranked the richest man in South-East Asia whereas Liem Sioe Liong (Sudono Salim) who was of Hockchia origin, was once the richest man in Indonesia, controlling a vast empire in the industry of flour, cement and food manufacturing.

=== United States ===
Fuzhounese people first started immigrating to America during the late Qing dynasty. Some of these immigrants were students who, after completing their studies returned to back to their fatherland (Fuzhou).

However, after the US passed the 1882 Chinese Exclusion Act, immigration from China to the USA stopped for nearly a century. Only in 1980s with the China-USA détente and subsequent reform and opening, a wave of Fuzhounese settled in America. These new Fuzhounese immigrants set up their own separated communities such as "Little Fuzhou" in Manhattan.

== Notable Fuzhou people ==
=== Scientists, mathematicians and inventors ===
- Chen Jingrun, mathematician
- Yan Fu, scholar and translator
- Chih-Tang Sah, professor
- Wei Kemei, chemical engineer
- Hou Debang, chemical engineer
- Hsien Wu, protein scientist
- Ray Wu, geneticist
- Zhuang Qiaosheng, geneticist
- Zhang Yuzhe, astronomer
- Wang Shouguan, astronomer
- Fu Chengyi, geophysicist
- Chia-Chiao Lin, mathematician and professor
- Tung-Yen Lin, structural engineer
- Deng Xuquan, microbiologist
- Wang Shizhen, physician
- Lee C. Teng, physicist
- Wu Mengchao, surgeon
- Guo Kexin, physicist, metallurgist and crystallographer
- Liang Shoupan, aerospace engineer
- Huang Chunping, aerospace engineer
- Li Zaiping, molecular biologist
- Liu Yingming, mathematician and academician
- Jeffrey Yi-Lin Forrest, mathematician and economist
- Hu Haiyan, physicist
- Sun Shensu, geochemist
- Chen Zhangliang, biologist, elected as vice-governor of Guangxi in 2007
- Min Zhuo, neuroscientist
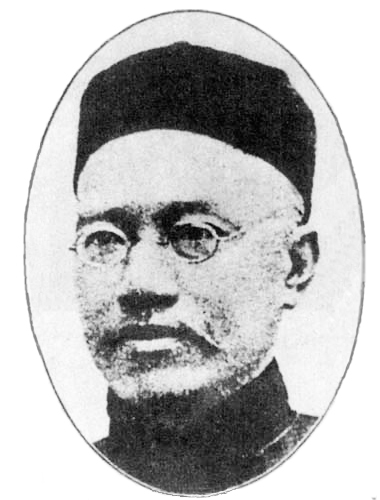
Yan Fu, a scientist who translated many of Charles Darwin's works and ideas into Chinese.

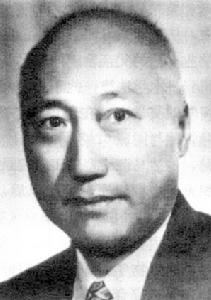
A famous protein scientist, Hsien Wu was the first to propose that protein denaturation was a purely conformational change.

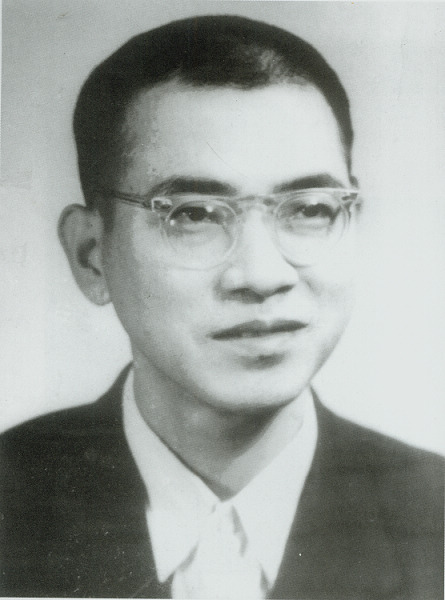
Mathematics genius, Chen Jingrun invented the Chen's theorem and Chen prime, he also stunned famous mathematicians by providing better solutions to their works.

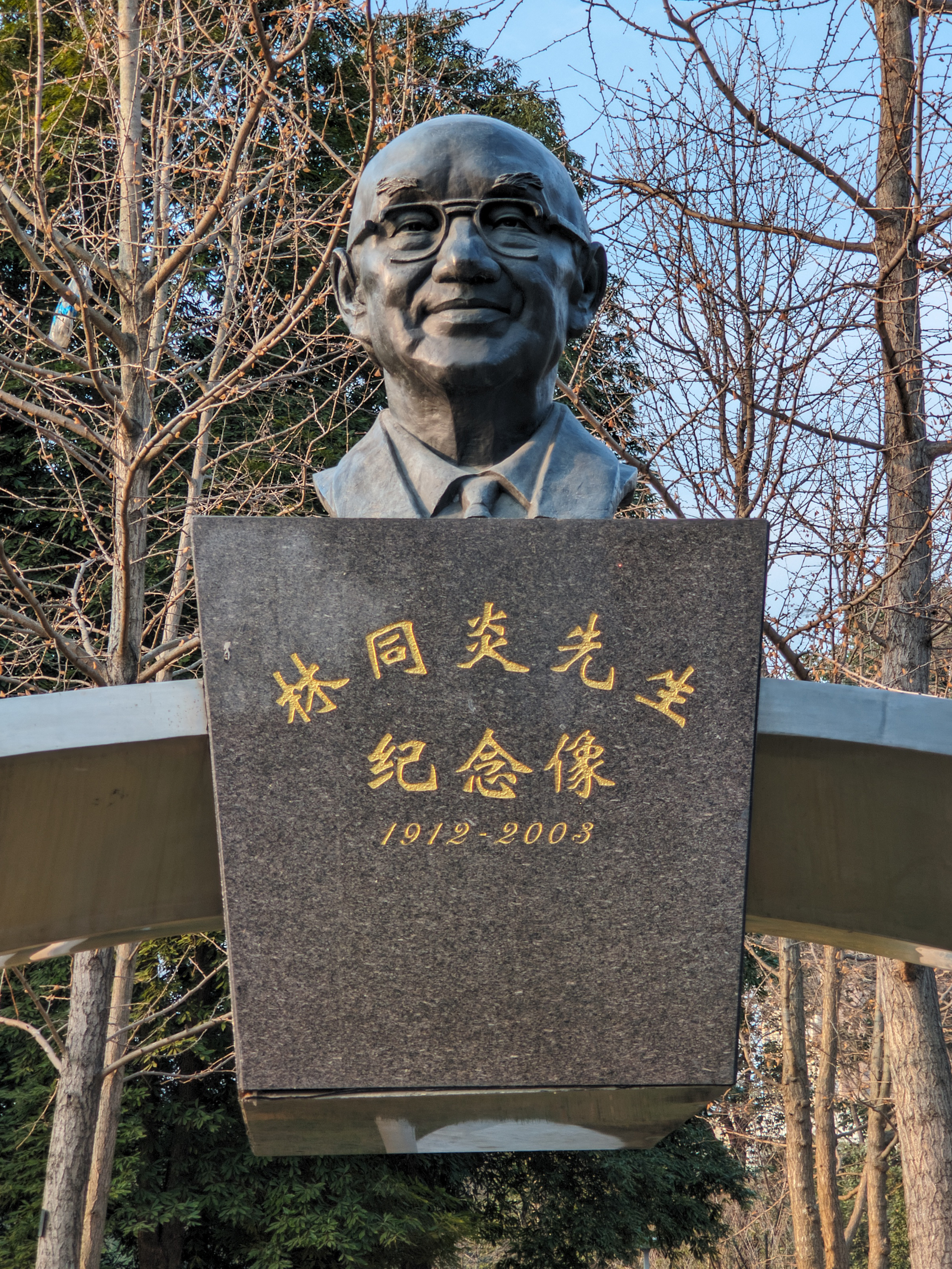
Tung-Yen Lin, a Chinese-American structural engineer who was the pioneer of standardizing the use of prestressed concrete.

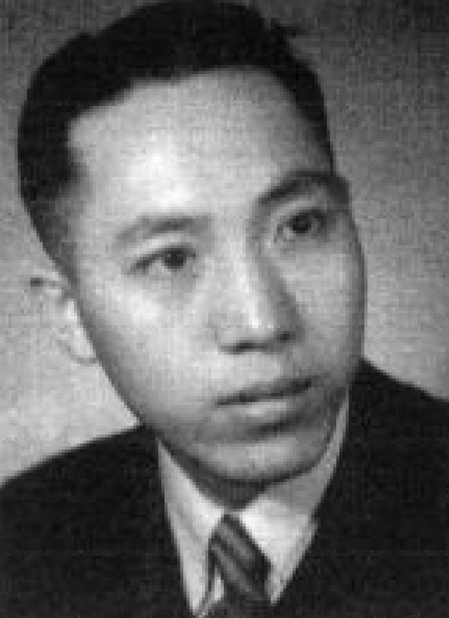
Wu Mengchao, a medical scientist who specialized in hepatobiliary surgery. He was also known as the "Father of Chinese Hepatobiliary Surgery".

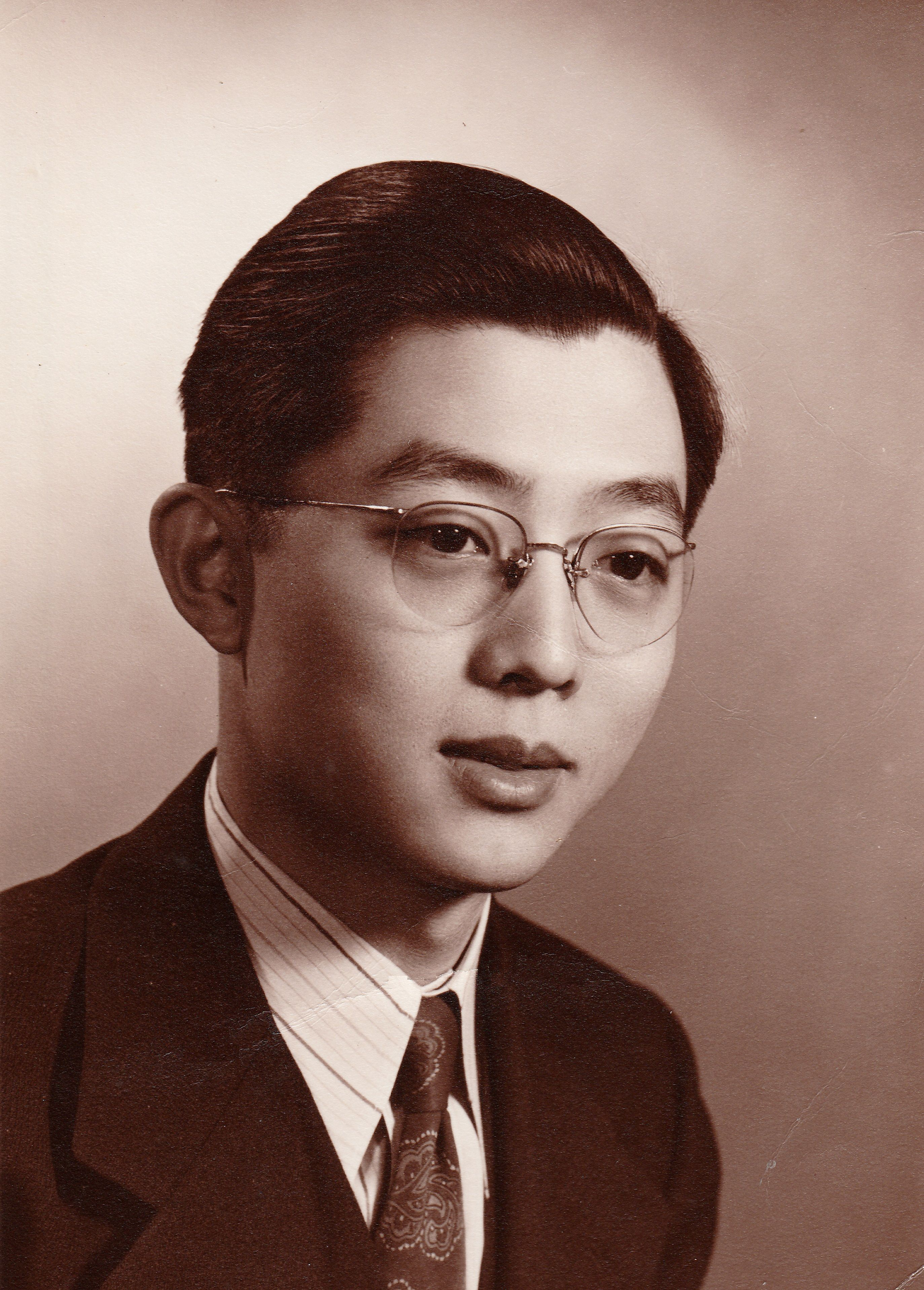
Xiao Guangyan, a petrochemist known for his research on catalysts used in petroleum processing.

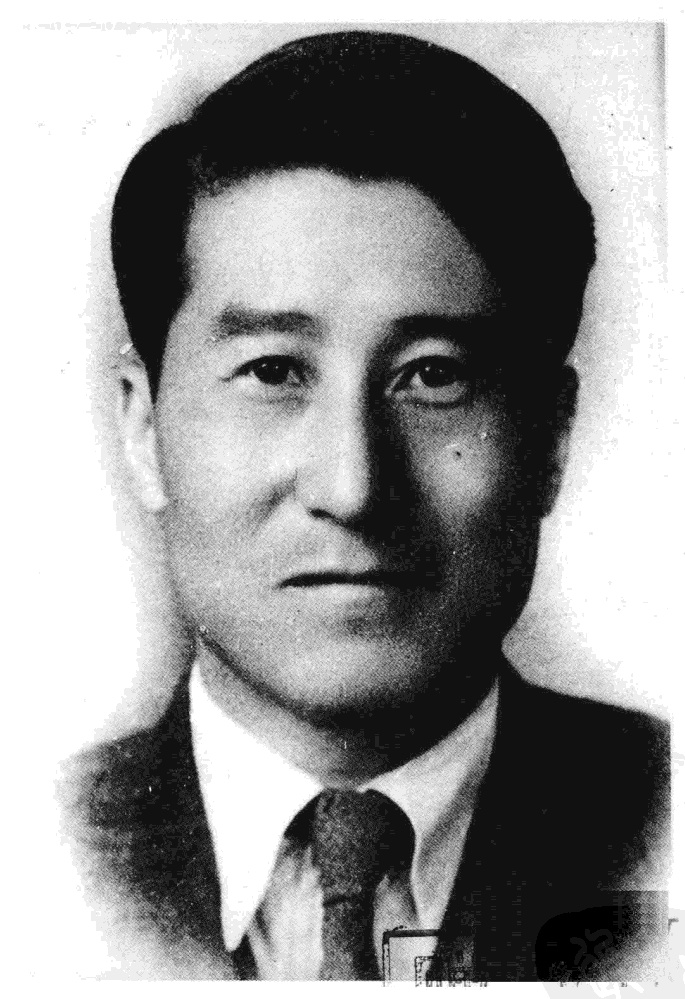
Shu Chun Teng, a famous mycologist.

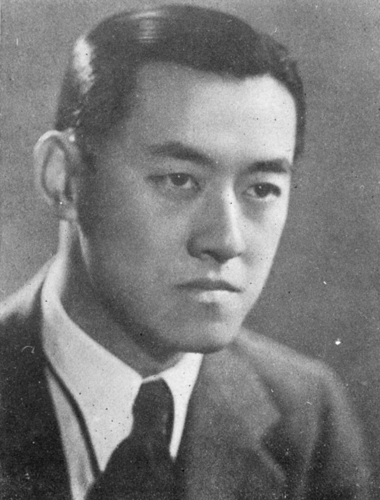
Chen Daisun (zh:陳岱孫), a finance scientist who is prominent in the history of economics research and education in China.

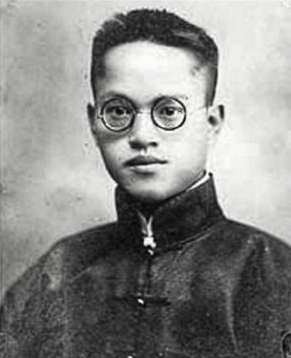
Zhang Yuzhe, an astronomer and director of the Purple Mountain Observatory who is widely regarded as the "Father of modern Chinese astronomy".

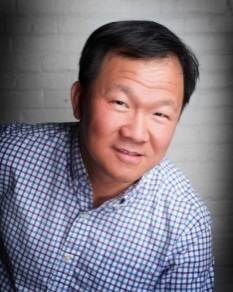
Min Zhuo, being an accomplished pain neuroscientist, he has won many honours and awards.

=== Politicians and revolutionaries ===
- Shen Song, a chancellor of the state Wuyue during the Five Dynasties and Ten Kingdoms Period
- Lin Ding, a chancellor of the state Wuyue during the Five Dynasties and Ten Kingdoms Period
- Ni Shu, a chancellor of the state Southern Han during the Five Dynasties and Ten Kingdoms period
- Zhu Wenjin, a general of the state Min during the Five Dynasties and Ten Kingdoms period
- Xue Yi (zh:薛奕), the first military Zhuangyuan of the Song dynasty
- Chen Youding, a warlord who quelled various uprisings at the end of Yuan dynasty in Fujian
- Yao Guangxiao, a strategist and Chan Buddhist monk who lived in the late Yuan and early Ming dynasties
- Zhang Jing, a prominent Ming dynasty general
- Ye Xianggao, a Senior Grand Secretariat of the Ming dynasty
- Chen Di, Ming-era philologist, strategist and traveler
- Gan Guobao, a Qing dynasty military leader
- Lin Zexu, a famous Qing dynasty scholar and official
- Shen Baozhen, Viceroy of Liangjiang from 1875 to 1879
- Chen Baochen, Chinese scholar and loyalist to the Qing dynasty
- Wong Nai Siong, a Chinese revolutionary leader and Christian scholar
- Chen Jitong, Chinese diplomat, general and scholar during the late Qing dynasty
- Liu Buchan, naval officer of the Beiyang Fleet, the most prominent of China's naval units in the late Qing dynasty
- Lin Yongsheng, naval officer of the Beiyang Fleet, the most prominent of China's naval units in the late Qing dynasty
- Sa Zhenbing, naval officer of Mongolian origin
- Zheng Xiaoxu, Chinese statesman, diplomat and calligrapher
- Liu Guanxiong, Chinese Admiral who was Navy Minister of China, from 1912 to 1916 and 1917–1919
- Lin Sen, President of the Republic of China from 1931 to 1943
- Chin Peng, former leader of the Malayan Communist Party
- Lin Xu, Chinese politician, scholar, songwriter and poet who lived in the late Qing dynasty
- Du Xigui, Chinese admiral during the warlord era
- Liang Hongzhi, a leading politician in the collaborationist Reformed Government of the Republic of China during World War II
- Yin Ju-keng, a political leader in the early Republic of China
- Zhu Shaoliang, a general in the National Revolutionary Army of the Republic of China
- Xiao Shuxuan, a general in the Reorganized National Government of China
- Lin Juemin, Chinese revolutionary
- Fang Shengdong, Chinese revolutionary
- Fang Junying, Chinese revolutionary
- Wu Shi, Chinese revolutionary
- Nie Xi, Chinese revolutionary
- Chen Shaokuan, fleet admiral who served as the senior commander of naval forces of the National Revolutionary Army
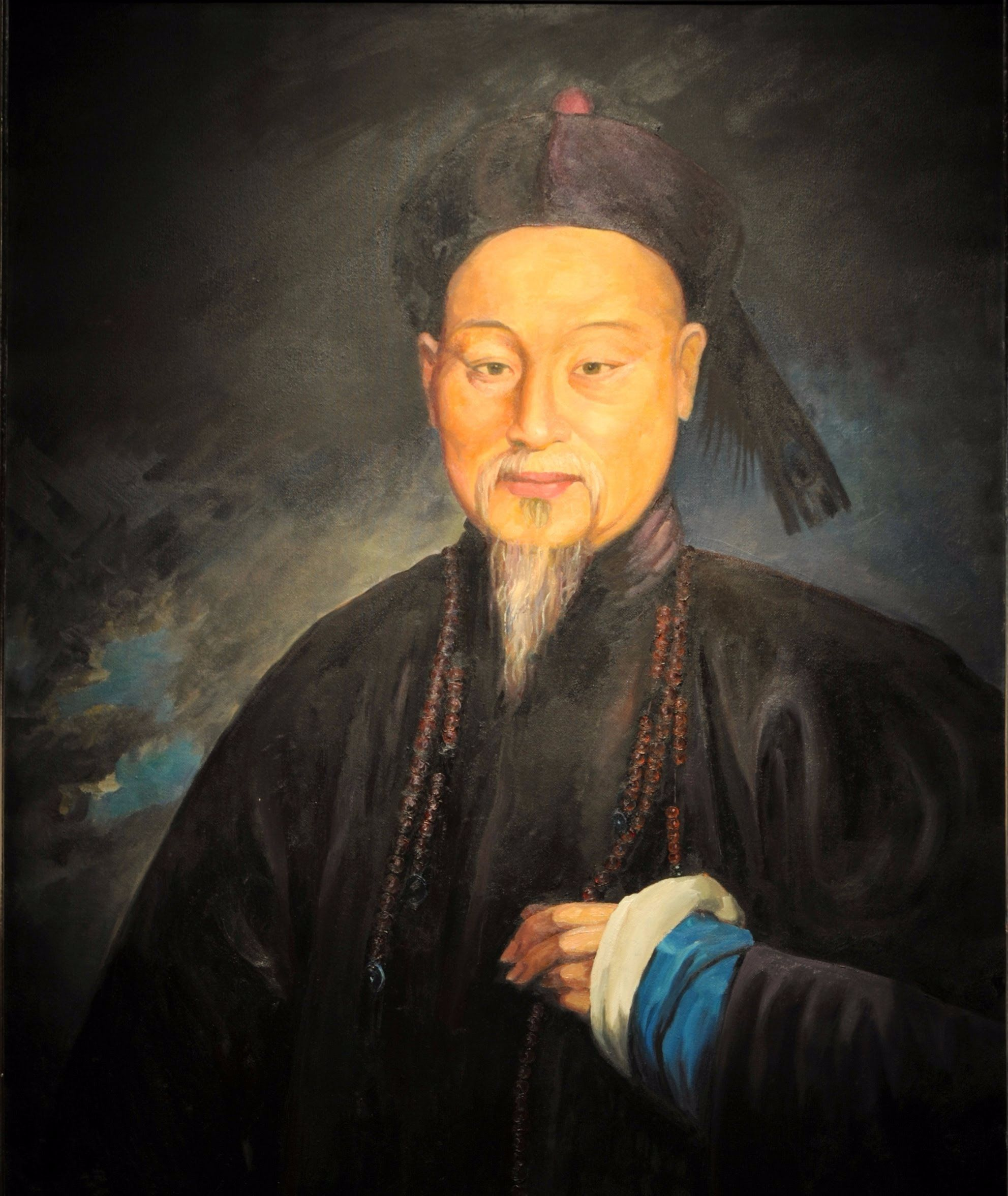
  Lin Zexu, national hero of China.
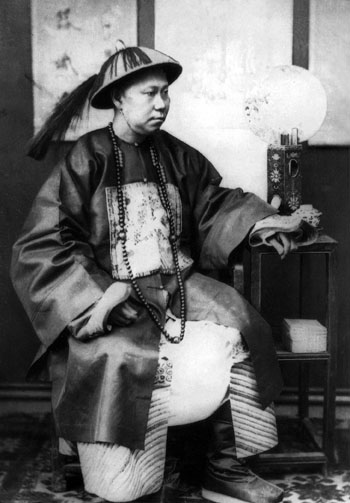
  Shen Baozhen, Viceroy of Liangjiang from 1875 to 1879.
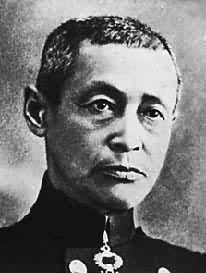
  Sa Zhenbing, high-ranking naval officer of Mongolian origin who lived through four governments in China.
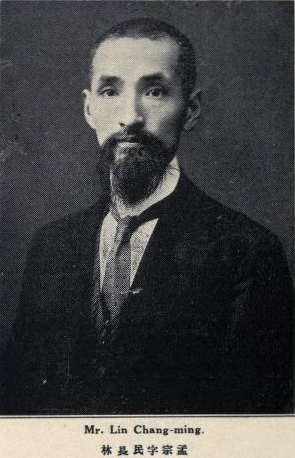
  Lin Changmin (zh:林長民), high-ranking governor in the Beiyang Government.
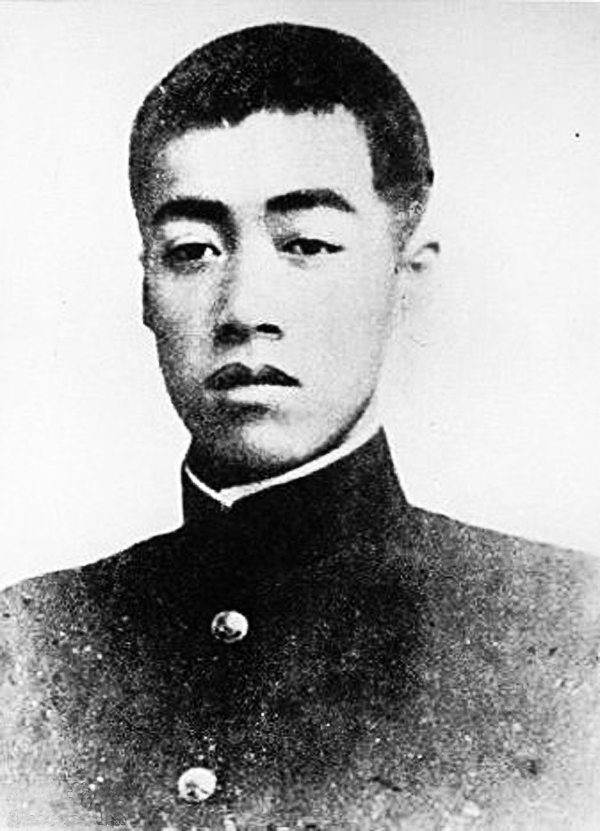
  Lin Juemin, one of 72 Revolutionary Martyrs at Huanghuagang.
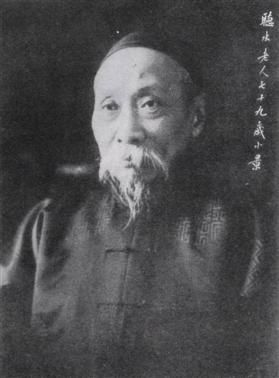
  Chen Baochen, imperial tutor of Puyi (the last emperor of China).
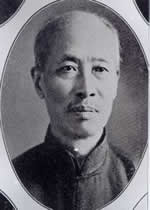
  Zheng Xiaoxu, statesman, diplomat and calligrapher.
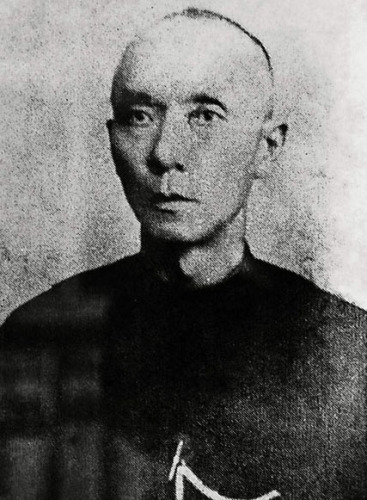
  Wong Nai Siong, prominent Qing era revolutionary leader.
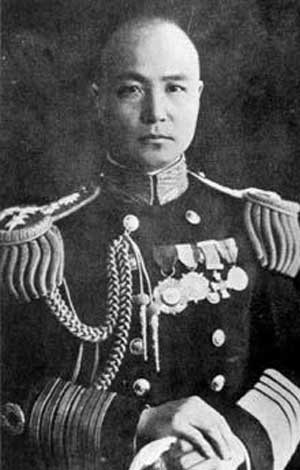
  Chen Shaokuan, high-ranking military commander of Republic of China Navy.
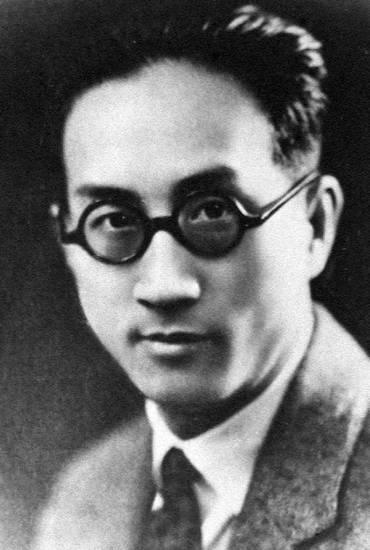
  Zou Taofen, journalist, media entrepreneur, and political activist.

=== Writers and poets ===
- Ingen, Ming-era Buddhist monk, poet, and calligrapher
- Chen Menglei, Qing-era scholar, philosopher, and historian
- Lin Changyi, Qing-era scholar, poet, and educator
- Lin Shu, Chinese scholar and translator, noted for his translation of Alexandre Dumas and La Dame aux Camélias
- Huang Jun, Chinese writer and poet
- Xue Shaohui, Qing-era female Chinese poet and translator
- Jiang Guhuai, Qing-era scholar, poet, and calligrapher
- Lin Huiyin, a female architect and poet
- Zou Taofen, Chinese patriot, journalist, media entrepreneur, and political activist
- Zheng Zhenduo, a Chinese journalist and literary scholar
- Zhu Qianzhi, intellectual, translator and historian
- Qiu Jin, a female Chinese writer
- Bing Xin, a female Chinese writer
- Lu Yin, a female Chinese writer
- Hu Yepin, leftist writer
- Deng Tuo, Chinese scholar and poet
- Zheng Min, Chinese scholar and poet
- Guo Huaruo, Chinese military writer
- Nelson Ikon Wu, Chinese-American writer
- Tsai Ding Hsin, Taiwanese calligrapher and poet
- Xie Mian, Chinese writer, poet, and educator
- Liu Xianjue, Chinese architectural historian and educator
- Wang Wen-hsing, Chinese-American writer
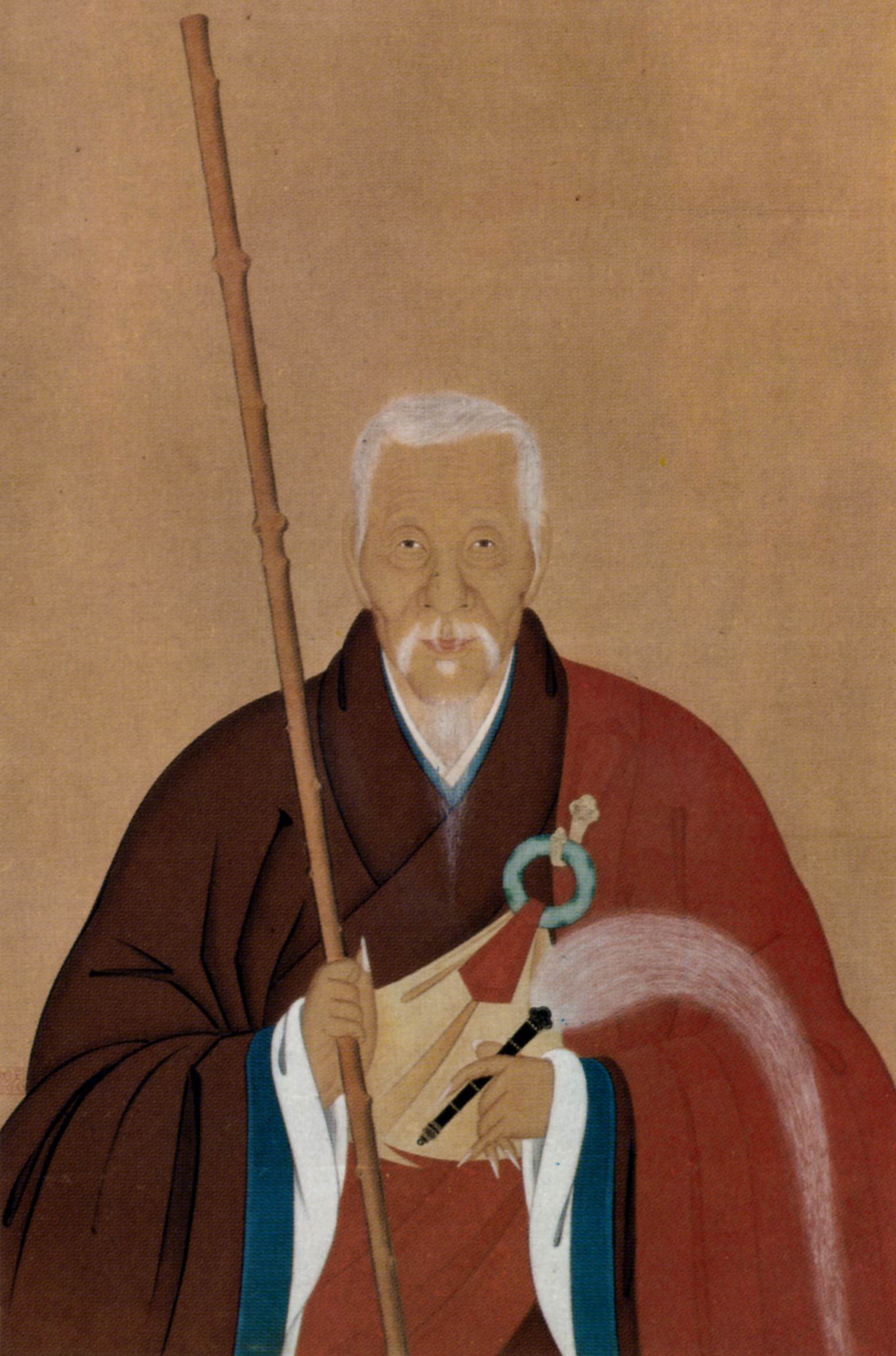
Ingen, Ming era Buddhist Monk.

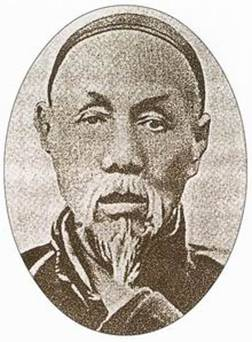
Lin Shu, scholar and translator.

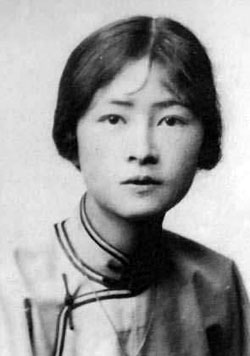
Lin Huiyin, female architect and poet.

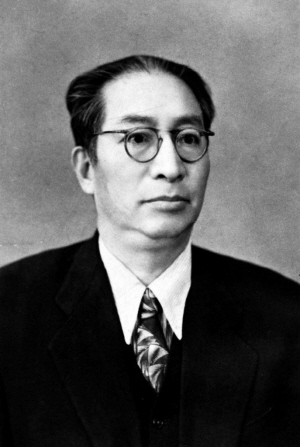
Zheng Zhenduo, master of literature.

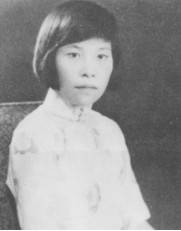
Lu Yin, female writer.

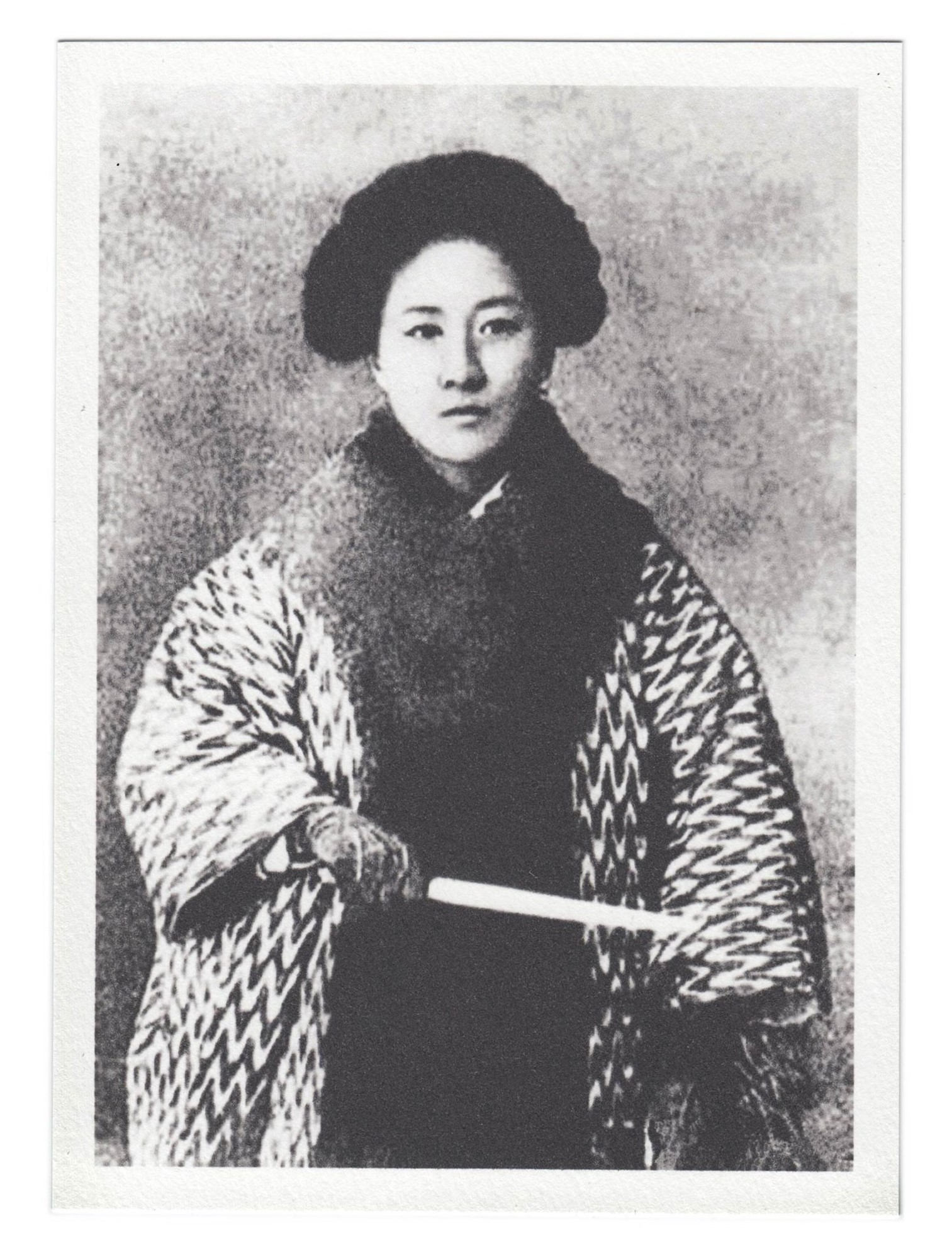
Qiu Jin, female poet and revolutionary leader.

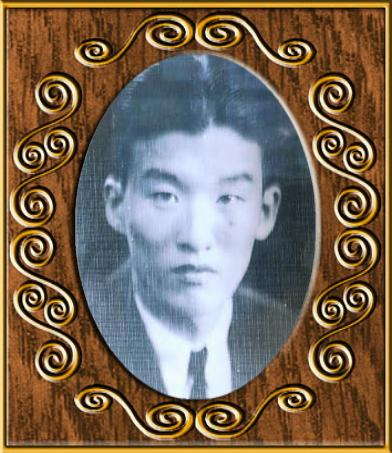
Deng Tuo, scholar and journalist.

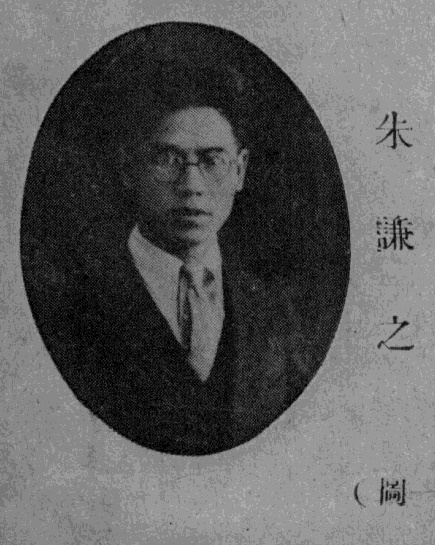
Zhu Qianzhi, one of the greatest philosophers and historians of modern China.

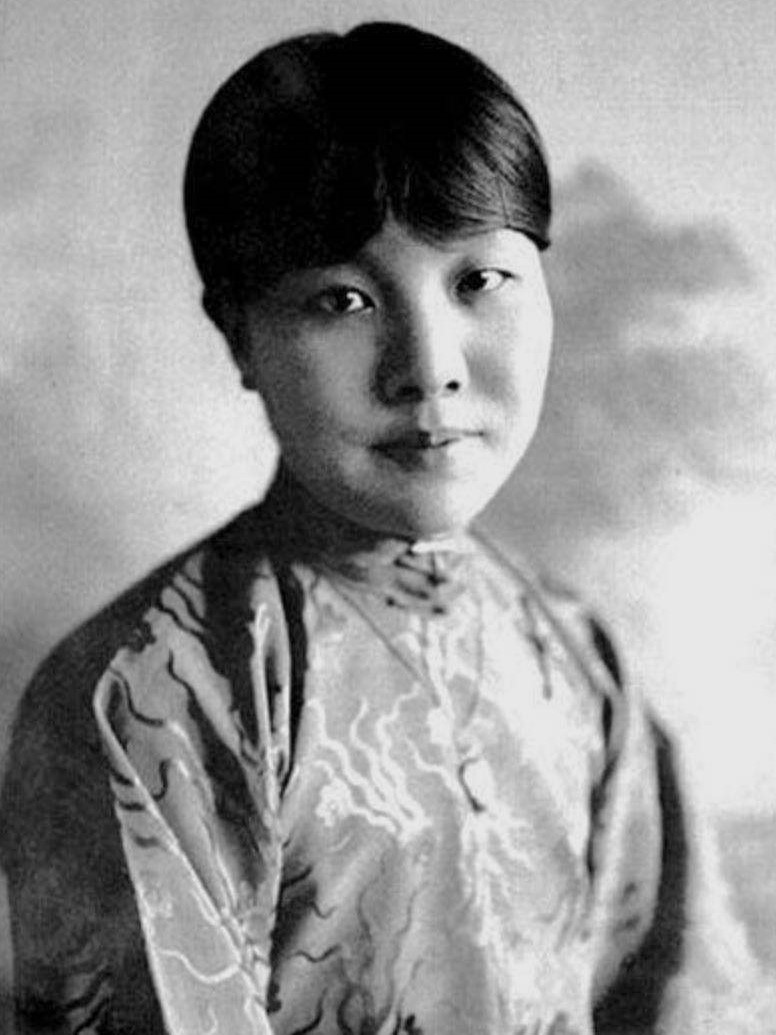
Bing Xin, one of the most prolific Chinese women writers of the 20th century.

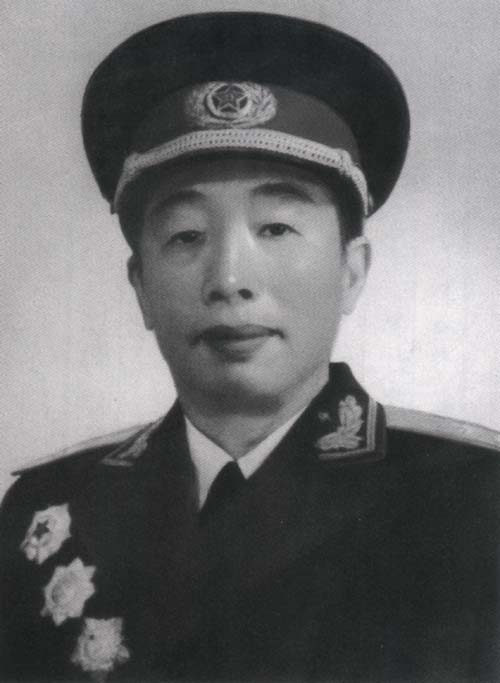
Guo Huaruo, military writer.

=== Businesspeople ===
- Tong Jixu, a Manchukuo official, and the founder of Yanguangshi
- Shih-Ying Lee, a Chinese-American aerodynamicist, inventor, and businessman
- Liem Sioe Liong, a Chinese-Indonesian billionaire and founder of Salim Group
- Robert Kuok, a Chinese-Malaysian billionaire and chairman of Shangri-La Hotels and Resorts
- Surya Wonowidjojo, the founder of Gudang Garam, the largest cigarette producer in Indonesia
- Huang Shuang'an, a Chinese-Indonesian entrepreneur and philanthropist
- Rachman Halim, executive of Gudang Garam
- Tiong Hiew King, executive
- Tiong Thai King, a Chinese-Malaysian politician and businessman, Member of the Malaysian Parliament for Lanang, Sibu, Sarawak from 1995 to 2013
- Huang Rulun, head of the privately held real estate developer Century Golden Resources Group
- Wei Chenghui, a Chinese-Singaporean tycoon who is also known as Singapore's "Popiah King"
- Cao Dewang, the chairman of Fuyao Group, one of the largest glass manufacturers in the world
- Gary Wang, the founder of video sharing company Tudou.com
- Joey Wat, the chief executive officer of Yum China

=== Others ===
- Baizhang Huaihai, influential master of Zen Buddhism
- Huangbo Xiyun, influential master of Zen Buddhism
- Sokuhi Nyoitsu, influential Buddhist monk of the Ōbaku Zen sect
- Go Seigen, professional Go player
- Tang Yunsheng, renowned Peking opera singer of Manchu origin
- Zhan Shi Chai, famous entertainer known as "Chang the Chinese Giant"
- Watchman Nee, Chinese Christian author and church leader
- Jahja Ling, orchestra conductor
- Lin Yaohua, sociologist and anthropologist
- Daniel Bambang Dwi Byantoro, an Indonesian Greek Old Calendarist archimandrite and founder of the decanate Indonesia Orthodox Church
- Nicholas Kao Se Tseien, Catholic priest
- Cheung Man-yee, the first Chinese person to become Director of Broadcasting (head of Radio Television Hong Kong) in the Hong Kong Government
- Maya Lin, American architect, designer, and sculptor
- Chen Kaige, Chinese filmmaker
- Cheng Nan-jung, Taiwanese publisher and activist
- Zheng Zhihua, Taiwanese songwriter and singer
- Xiao Qiang, Taiwanese model, actress, singer and writer
- Lin Hsi-Lei, Taiwanese actress and model
- Lin Chi-ling, Taiwanese model, actress, singer and television host
- Lin Zhiying, Taiwanese singer, actor, and race car driver
- Chen Haomin, Hong Kong actor and singer
- Yoyo Chen, Hong Kong actress and model
- Jinny Ng, Hong Kong singer, hostess and actress
- Ludi Lin, Canadian actor and model
- Jony J, Chinese rapper and songwriter
- Chen Haoyu, Chinese singer and actress
- Ou Hao, Chinese actor and singer
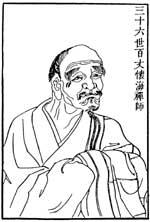
Baizhang Huaihai, influential master of Zen Buddhism during the Tang dynasty.

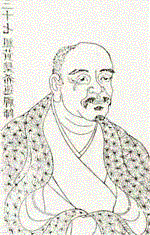
Huangbo Xiyun, influential master of Zen Buddhism during the Tang dynasty.

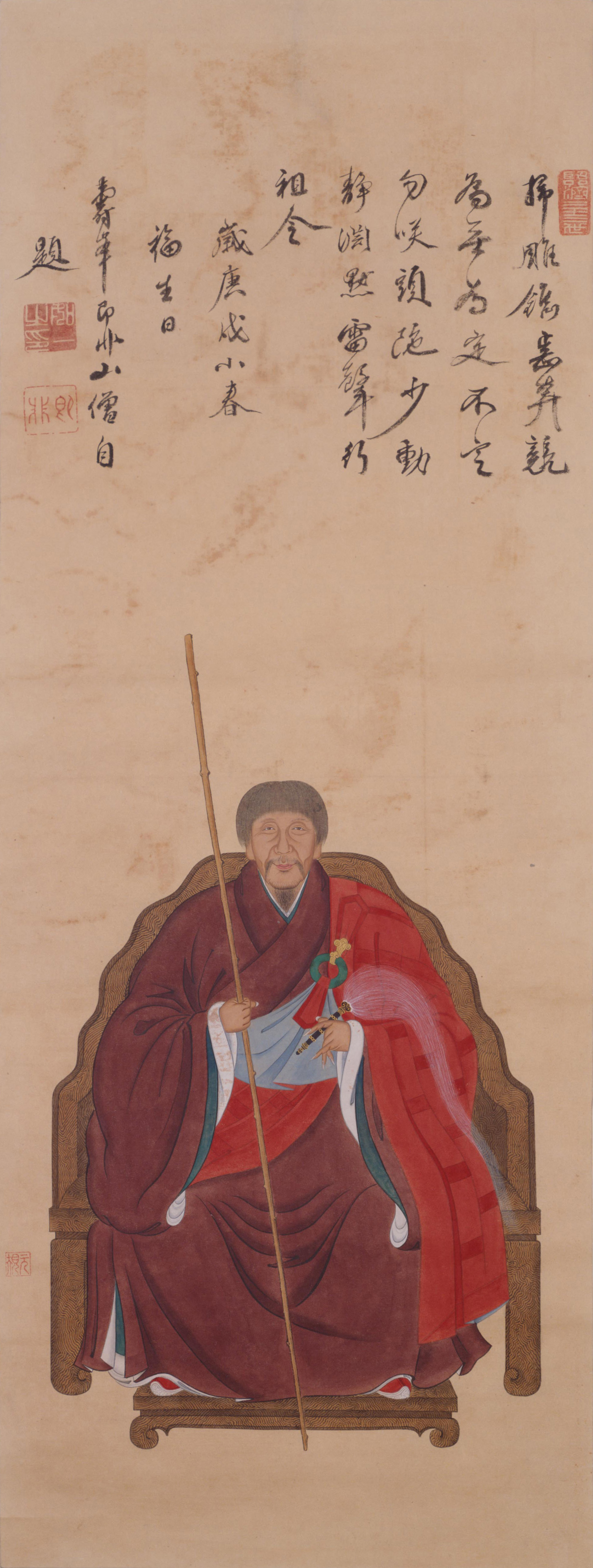
Sokuhi Nyoitsu, influential Buddhist master of the Ōbaku Zen sect.

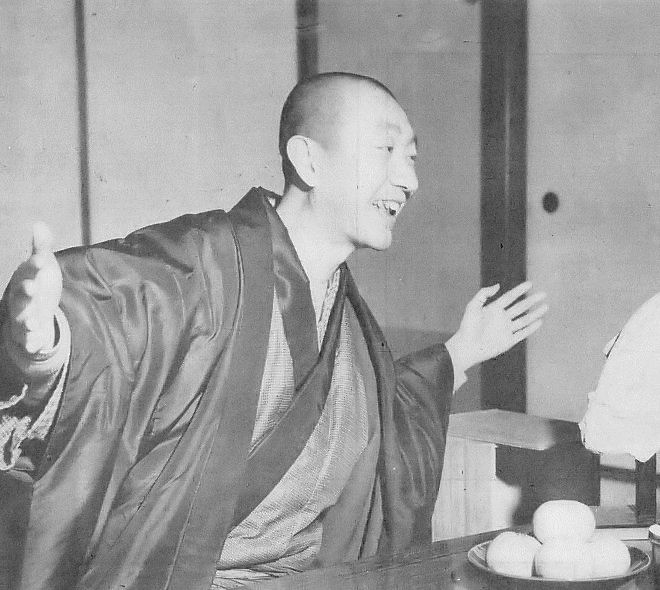
Go Seigen, Weiqi/Go player, considered by many players to be the greatest player of the game in the 20th century and one of the greatest of all time.

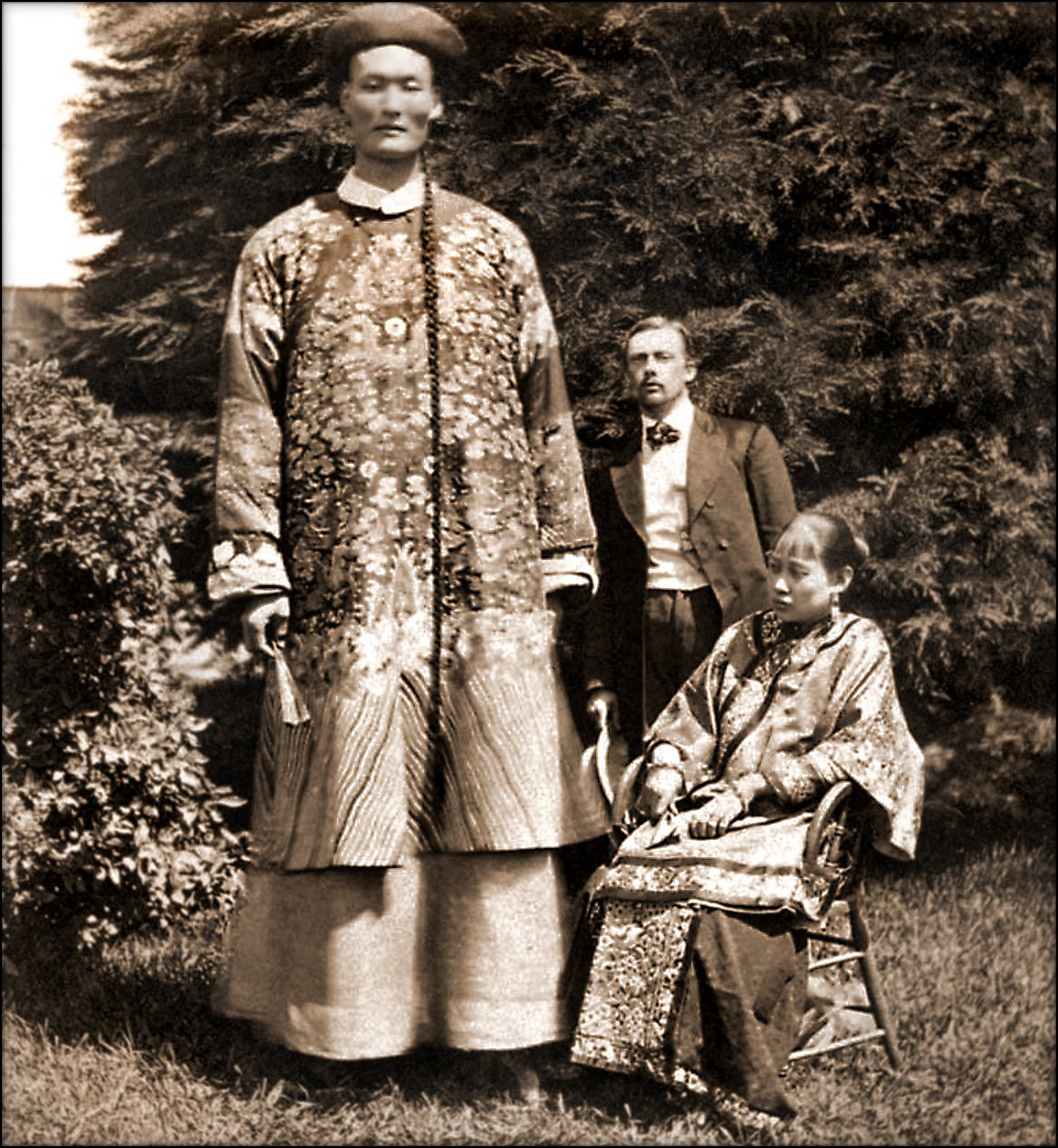
Zhan Shichai, Entertainer toured the world as "Chang the Chinese Giant" in the 19th century.

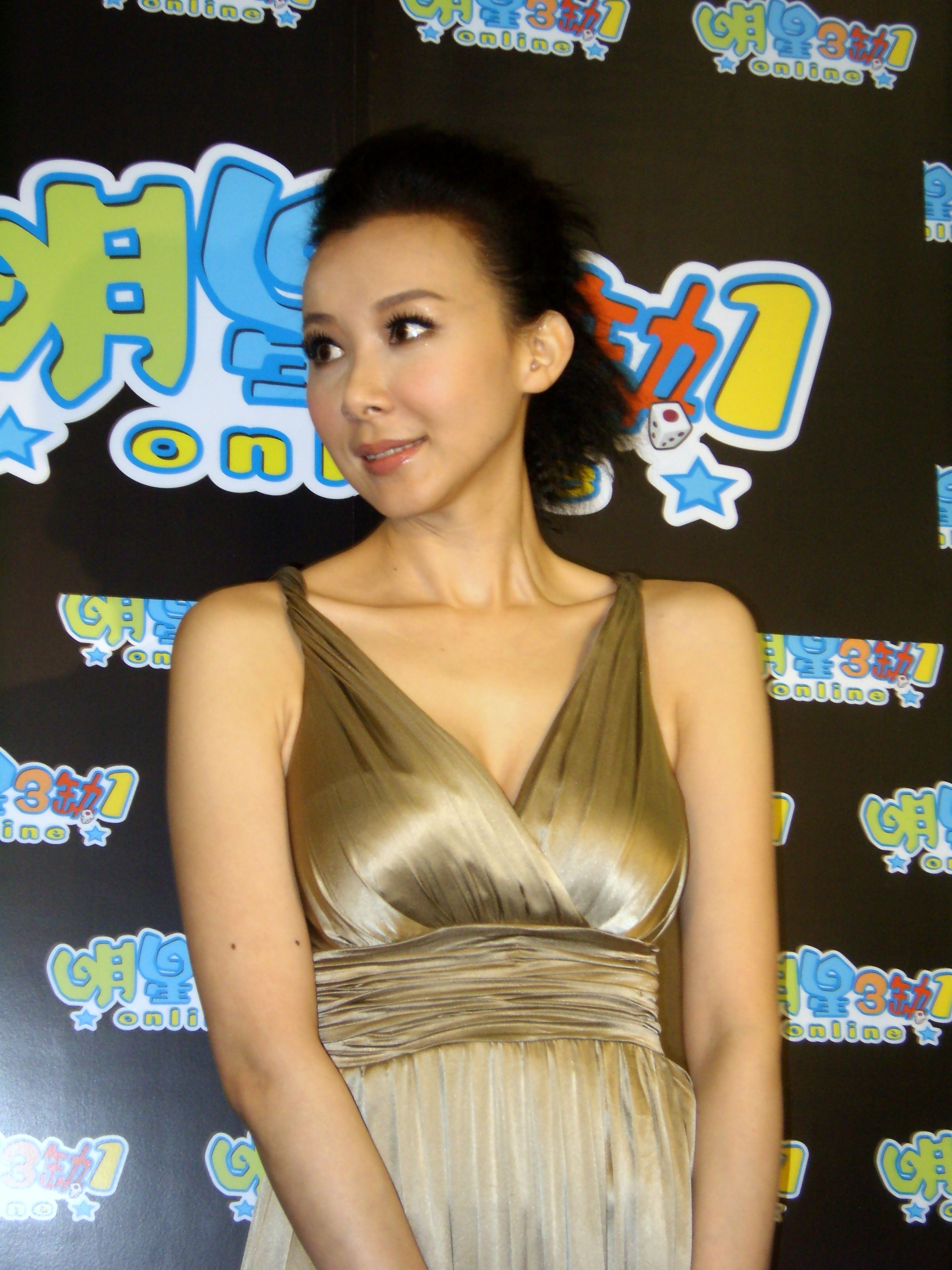
Xiao Qiang, Taiwanese model, actress, singer, and writer.

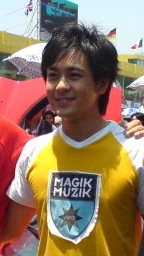
Lin Zhiying, Taiwanese singer, actor, and race car driver.

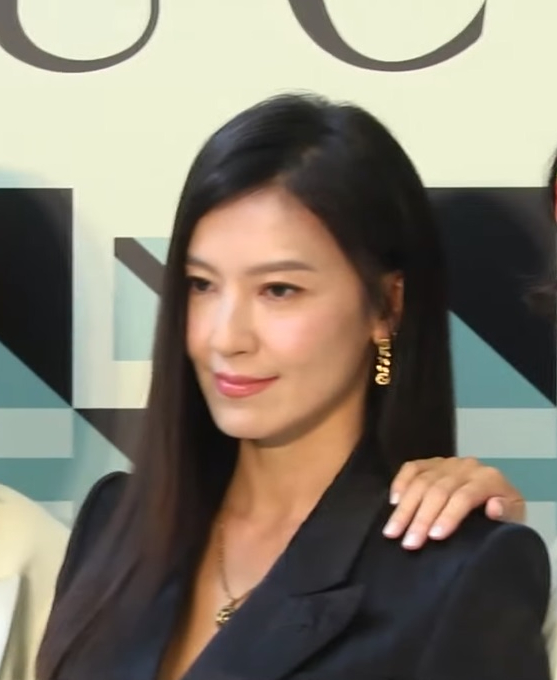
Lin Xilei, Taiwanese actress and model.

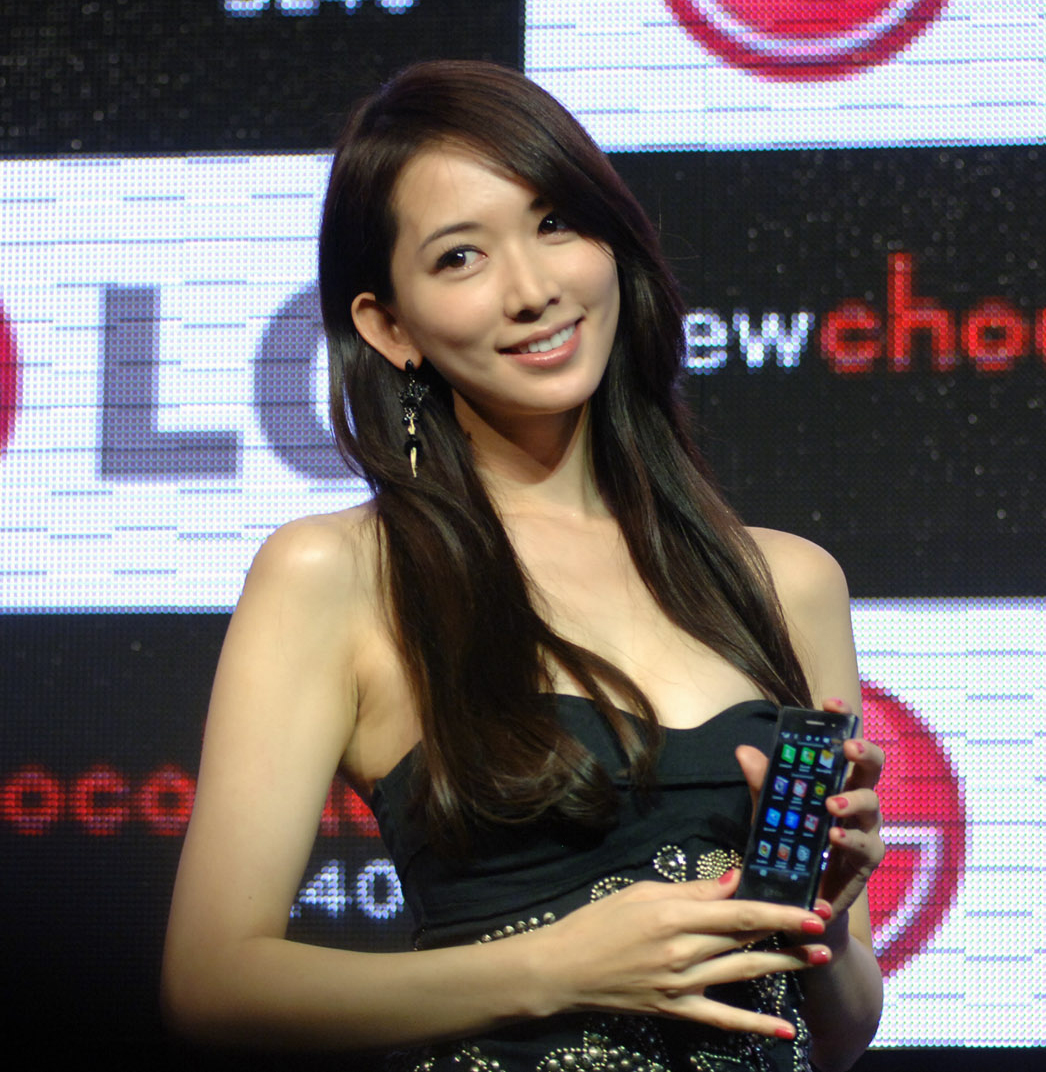
Lin Chi-ling, Taiwanese model, actress, singer, and television host.

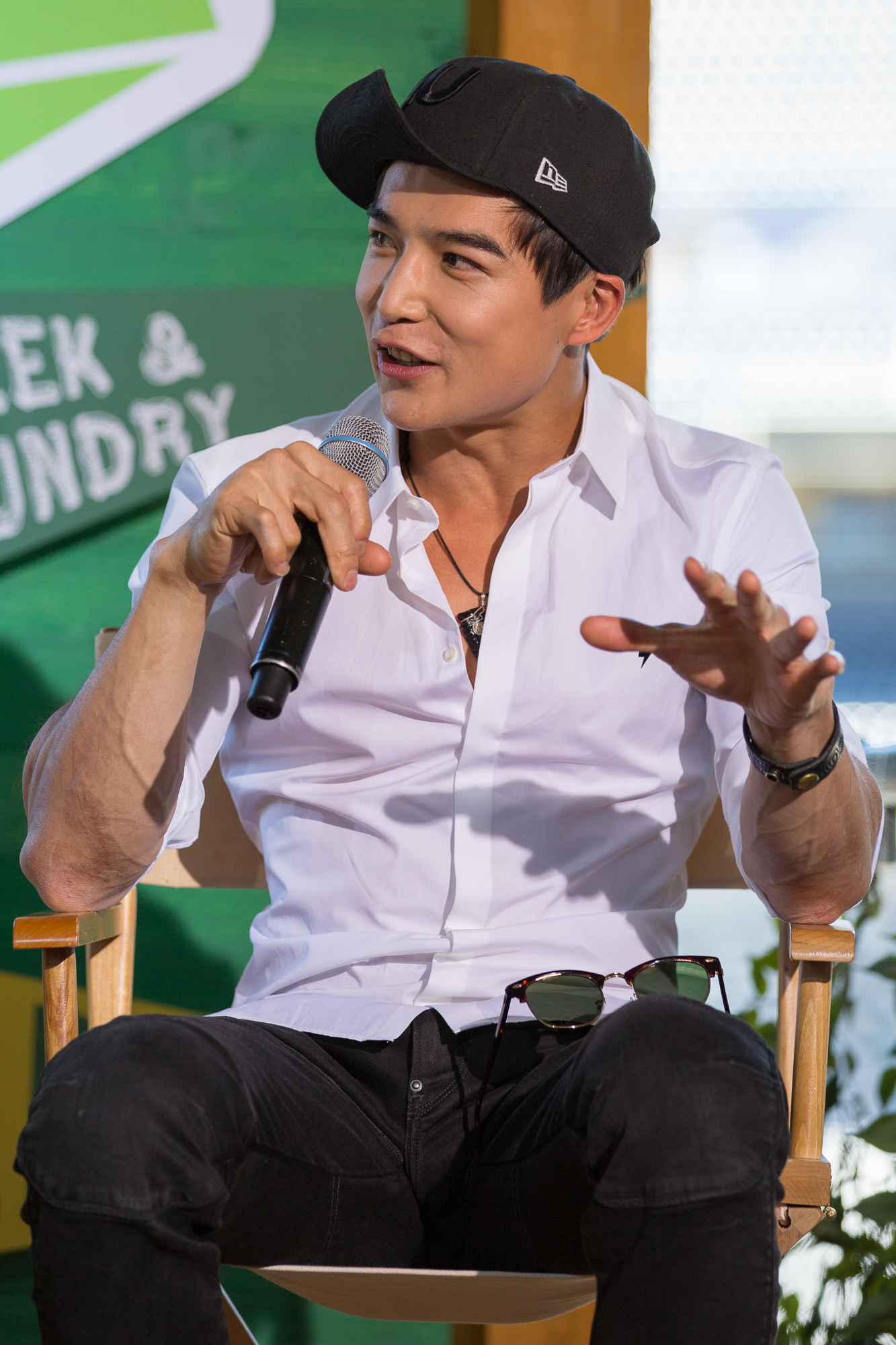
Ludi Lin, Chinese-Canadian actor and model.

== See also ==
- Timeline of Fuzhou
- Fuzhou dialect
- Ningde dialect
- Lady Linshui
- Fuzhou cuisine
- Min opera
