= Zeng Rongsheng =

Chinese geophysicist (1924–2019)

- 曾融生
- Born: 16 August 1924; Fuqing, Fujian, China
- Died: 22 October 2019 (aged 95); Beijing, China
- Education: Xiamen University
- Awards: National Science Congress Award (1978); State Science and Technology Progress Award (1997)
- Scientific career
- Fields: Solid earth geophysics
- Workplaces: Institute of Geophysics, China Earthquake Administration

Chinese name
- Chinese: 曾融生
Transcriptions
Standard Mandarin
- Hanyu Pinyin: Zēng Róngshēng
- Wade–Giles: Tsêng¹ Jung²-shêng¹

Zeng Rongsheng (Chinese: 曾融生; 16 August 1924 – 22 October 2019) was a Chinese geophysicist and earthquake researcher who helped establish the geophysics programs at the China University of Geosciences (Beijing), Peking University, and the University of Science and Technology of China. He investigated the crustal structures of many locations in China and their relations to earthquakes. Considered a founder of solid earth geophysics in the country, he was elected an academician of the Chinese Academy of Sciences in 1980.

== Life and career ==
Zeng was born on 16 August 1924 in Fuqing, Fujian, Republic of China, with his ancestral home in Pingtan County. After graduating from Xiamen University in July 1946, he was hired by the university as a teaching assistant.

In September 1947, Zeng joined the Institute of Physics of the National Peiping Academy in Beiping (now Beijing) as an assistant researcher. He joined the Institute of Geophysics of the Chinese Academy of Sciences in 1950 as an assistant professor and later associate professor. In 1978, he became a research professor at the Institute of Geophysics of the China Earthquake Administration, where he worked until his retirement in 2018. He was elected an academician of the Chinese Academy of Sciences (CAS) in 1980.

Zeng died in Beijing on 22 October 2019, aged 95.

== Contributions ==
In the 1950s and 1960s, Zeng assisted academician Fu Chengyi with establishing geophysics programs at the China University of Geosciences (Beijing), Peking University, and the University of Science and Technology of China. His first graduate student, Chen Yuntai, also became an academician of the CAS.

Zeng conducted a low-frequency seismic wave experiment in the Qaidam Basin in 1958. The project later won the National Science Congress Award in 1978. He examined the crustal structures of many locations in China and investigated sources of seismic waves. He studied the geodynamics of the extensional basins in North China and their connection to the 1976 Tangshan earthquake.

In the 1990s, Zeng organized the first Sino-American joint project to investigate the crust and upper mantle of the Tibetan Plateau and the collision process of the Indian Plate with the Eurasian Plate. He was conferred the State Science and Technology Progress Award (Third Class) in 1997.

Zeng published Introduction to Solid Earth Geophysics (固体地球物理学导论) in 1984, the first systematic book on the subject in China. A monumental work with more than 660,000 Chinese characters, it has been widely used in education and research. He is generally considered a founder of solid earth geophysics in China.
