= Pingnan =

Pingnan may refer to the following locations in the People's Republic of China:

== Counties ==
- Pingnan County, Fujian (屏南县), in Ningde, Fujian
- Pingnan County, Guangxi (平南县), in Guigang, Guangxi

== Subdistricts ==
- Pingnan Subdistrict, Siping (平南街道), in Tiedong District, Siping, Jilin
- Pingnan Subdistrict, Pingnan County, Guangxi, in Pingnan County, Guangxi

== Towns ==
- Pingnan, Gansu (平南镇), in Tianshui, Gansu
- Pingnan, Lingshan County (平南镇), in Lingshan County, Guangxi
- Pingnan, Zhejiang (屏南镇), in Longquan, Zhejiang

== Townships ==
- Pingnan Township, Guangxi (屏南乡), in Hechi, Guangxi
- Pingnan Qiang Ethnic Township (平南羌族乡), in Pingwu County, Sichuan
