= Wan'an Bridge (Pingnan) =

Wan'an Bridge 万安桥
- Coordinates: 26°49′22″N 118°50′40″E
- Locale: Changqiao Town, Pingnan County, Ningde, Fujian

Characteristics
- Design: Arch Bridge
- Material: Wood

The Wan'an Bridge (simplified Chinese: 万安桥; traditional Chinese: 萬安橋; pinyin: Wàn'ān Qiáo) was located in Changqiao Village, Changqiao Town, Pingnan County, Ningde, Fujian, China. It was the longest existing wooden arch bridge in China.

== History ==
The Wan'an Bridge had been rebuilt many times over the past dynasties and had long been preserved.

According to records, Wan'an Bridge was built in Song Dynasty and has a history of 923 years. It was burned in 1708, rebuilt in 1742, and repaired in subsequent years. In May 2006, it was announced as the sixth batch of national key cultural relics protection units as "one of the covered bridges in northeastern Fujian. In November 2012, it was selected into the preliminary list of China's world cultural heritage.

On the evening of 6 August 2022, Wan'an Bridge caught fire. The fire was extinguished at 22:45 that night, and the bridge body was burned and collapsed. Pingnan County officials said they will start protection and restoration work while investigating the cause of the fire.

== Architecture ==
Wan'an Bridge was 98.2 metres (322 ft) long and 4.7 metres (15 ft) wide, with five piers and six holes. The bridge was made of Chinese fir, and nine logs, three yellow beams, eight logs and four yellow beams are used at both ends of each hole to form an arch. There were 38 corridor houses on the bridge, with bridge chairs on both sides.
