= Gan Guobao =

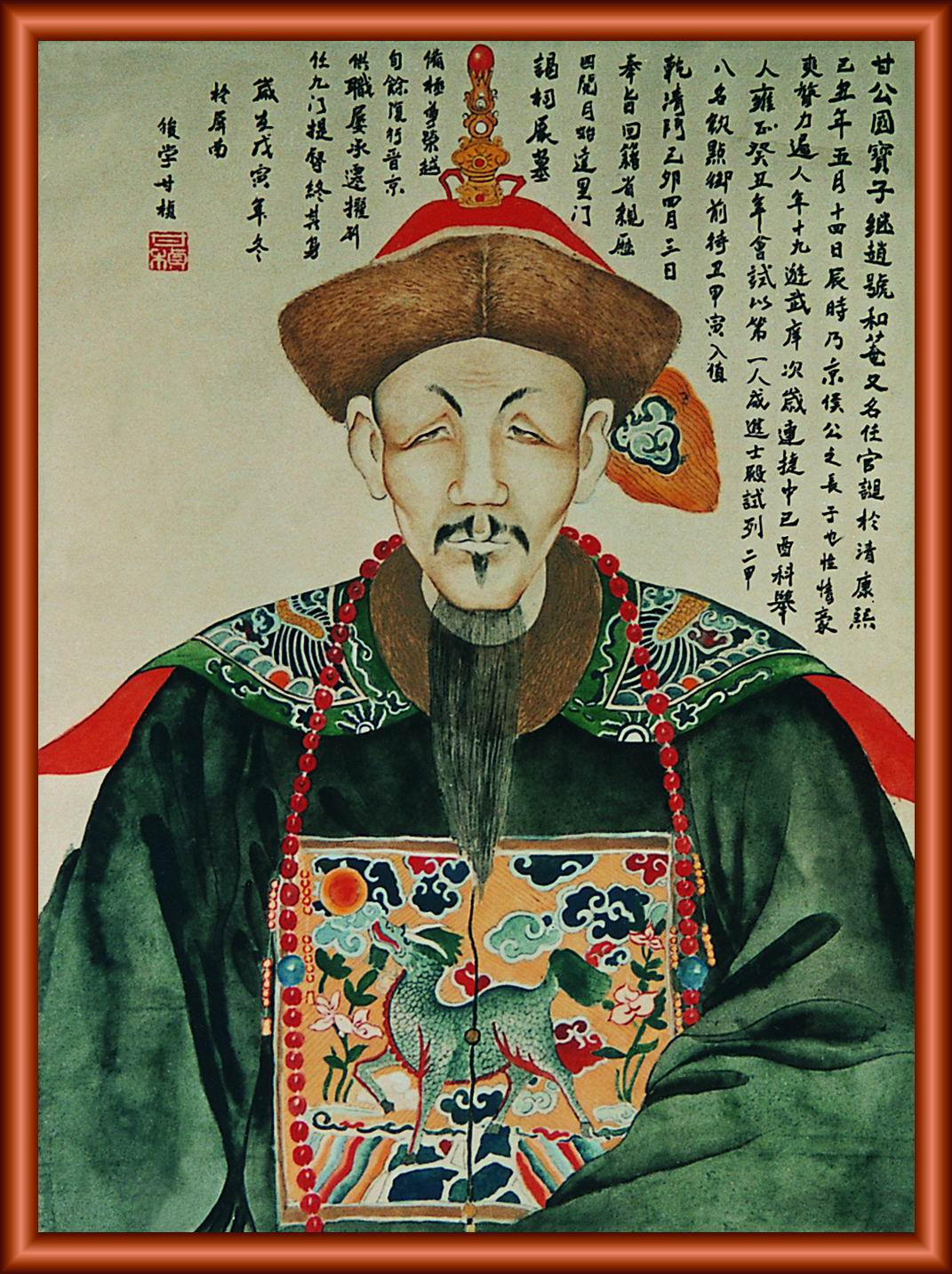

Infantry Commander of Fujian
- In office 1769–1776

Infantry Commander of Guandong
- In office 1767–1769

Chief commander of Taiwan
- In office 1766–1767
- Preceded by: Yang Rui
- Succeeded by: Wang Wei
- In office 1759–1761
- Preceded by: Huang Shijun
- Succeeded by: Pei Jing

Admiral of Fujian Navy
- In office 1761–1763
- Preceded by: Ma Longtu
- Succeeded by: Huang Shijian

Personal details
- Born: 1709 Ershiliudu, Gutian, Fujian, Qing Empire (now Xiaoliyang Village, Pingnan, Fujian, China)
- Died: 1776 (aged 66–67) Quanzhou, Fujian, Qing Empire
- Education: Wujinshi degree in the Imperial Examination

Military service
- Allegiance: Qing Dynasty
- Branch/service: Qing Army; Qing Navy

Gan Guobao
- Traditional Chinese: 甘國寶
- Simplified Chinese: 甘国宝
Transcriptions
Standard Mandarin
- Hanyu Pinyin: Gān Guóbǎo
Southern Min
- Hokkien POJ: Kam Kok-pó
Eastern Min
- Fuzhou BUC: Găng Guók-bō̤

Gan Guobao (Chinese: 甘國寶; pinyin: Gān Guóbǎo, 1709–1776), courtesy name Jizhao (繼趙), was a military officer in Qing Dynasty. Born in Gutian, Fujian Province, Gan was a provincial military commander of Guangdong Province and Fujian Province.

== Life ==
Gan Guobao was born in the 26th District of Gutian County, Fuzhou Prefecture, Fujian Province (now Xiaoliyang Village, Pingnan County, Ningde City, Fujian Province). He started learning martial arts at a young age and was physically strong and robust. Around age 14, in the first year of the Yongzheng reign (1723), he passed the imperial martial arts examination. In the early years of the Qianlong reign, he served as a game shooter in the right wing of the Zhongying Battalion. He served as the "deputy general" in Chunjiang, Guangdong. In the 20th year of the Qianlong reign, he served as the general of Weinan Town, Guizhou, and was later transferred to serve as the general of Yanzhou Town, Shandong. He also served as the general of Suzhou Town in Jiangnan, and the general of Wenzhou Town in Zhejiang. In the 23rd year of the Qianlong reign (1758), he was transferred to serve as the general of Nanao Town, Fujian, and the following year, he became the general of Haitan Town, Fujian. In the 24th year of the Qianlong reign (1759), he was appointed as the general of Taiwan Town, Fujian. In the 26th year of the Qianlong reign (1761), he was promoted to the position of Admiral of the Fujian Navy (the highest-ranking naval officer in Fujian Province). In the 32nd year of the Qianlong reign (1767), he served as the Viceroy of Guangdong (the highest-ranking military officer in Guangdong Province). In the 34th year (1769), he served as the Viceroy of the Fujian Army (the highest-ranking military officer in Fujian Province).

Gan Guobao loved literature and art, and was a skilled landscape painter who especially excelled in painting tigers. His finger paintings of tigers were diverse in form, and he often signed his works as "living by his fingertips." One of his famous works, Tiger, which is now in the collection of Taiwan's National Museum of History, is a prime example of his finger painting style. It was designated as an important antique by Taiwan's Ministry of Culture on December 6, 2011.

== Historical sites ==
There are two former residences of Gan Guobao that are still in existence today. One is located in the Wenru Lane of Sanfang Qixiang in Fuzhou City, and the other is located in Xiaoliyang Village, Gantang Township, Pingnan County.
