= Xiao Guangyan =

Chinese petrochemist

- 萧光琰
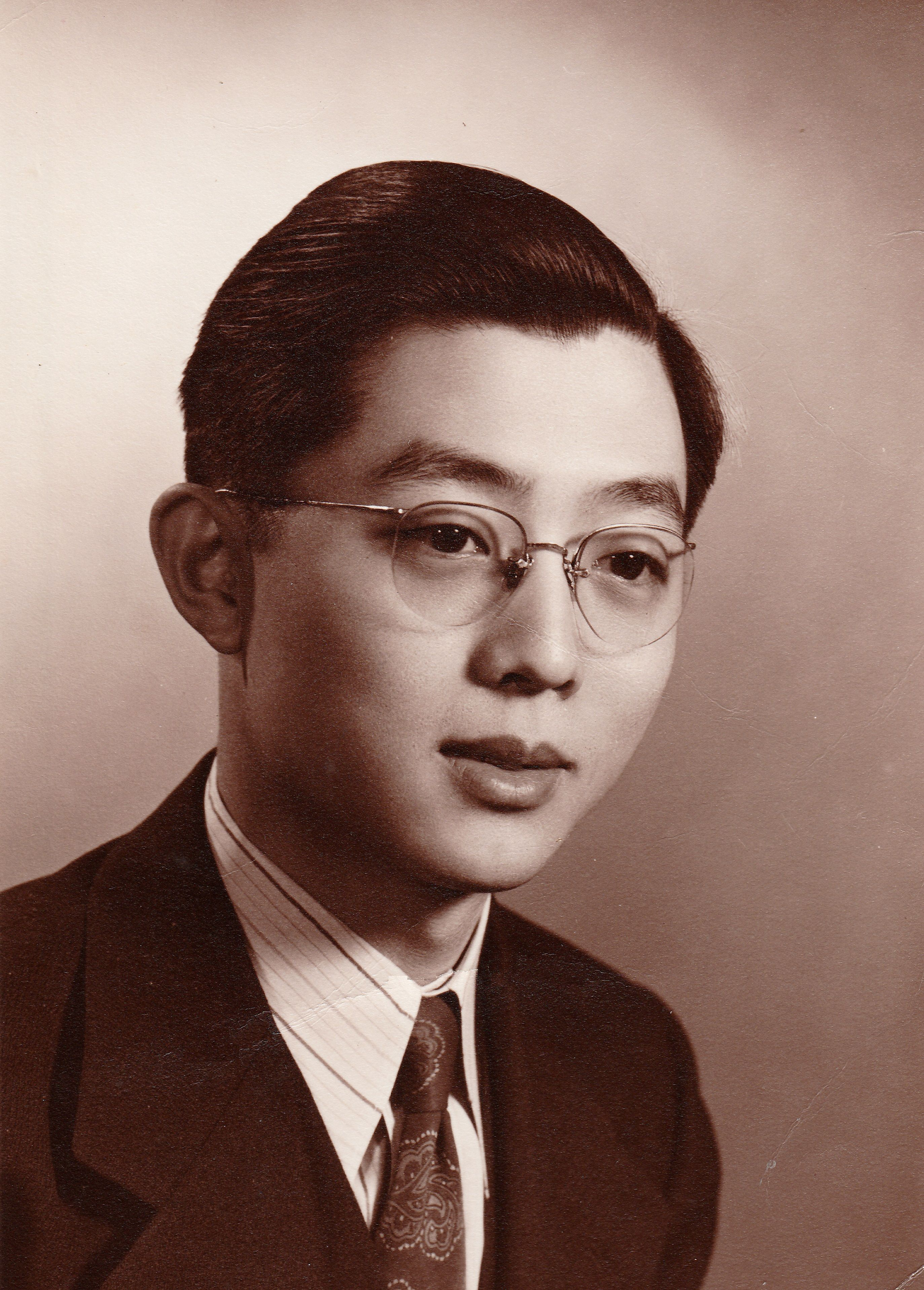
- Born: September 15, 1920; Tokyo Prefecture, Japanese Empire
- Died: December 11, 1968 (aged 48); Dalian, Liaoning Province, People's Republic of China
- Education: Pasadena City College; Pomona College (BA); University of Chicago (PhD)
- Spouse: Zhen Suhui
- Children: Xiao Luolian (daughter)
- Scientific career
- Fields: Chemistry, especially petrochemistry (catalyst application in petroleum processing, etc.)
- Doctoral advisor: James Franck

Guangyan Xiao (Note: In this Chinese name, the family name is Xiao.) (Chinese: 萧光琰, sometimes written as Xiao Guangyan or Xiao Guang Yan, September 15, 1920 – December 11, 1968) was a Chinese petrochemist known for his research on catalysts used in petroleum processing.

Xiao was born in Japan to Chinese parents. He later moved to the United States to pursue his studies, enrolling at Pasadena City College in 1940 before transferring to Pomona College, where he earned a B.A. in chemistry in 1942. He subsequently obtained a Ph.D. in chemistry from the University of Chicago.

Following the establishment of the People's Republic of China, Xiao returned to China in 1951. He became a pioneering figure in petrochemical research, focusing on catalysts for hydrocracking, hydroisomerization, and other petroleum processing techniques.

During the Cultural Revolution, Yan fell out of favor and, in 1968, died by suicide along with his wife and daughter. He was posthumously rehabilitated in 1972.

== Biography ==
=== Early life and years in the United States ===
Xiao Guangyan was born on September 15, 1920, in Tokyo Prefecture, Empire of Japan. His father, Xiao Quanxuan, was a military attaché at the Embassy of the Republic of China in Japan and later served as a minister in the Wang Jingwei regime.

From 1928 to 1937, Xiao attended Shanghai Nanyang Model Middle and Primary School. In February 1937, he moved to the United States, where he enrolled at Pasadena City College. He completed high school in 1938 and finished his freshman and sophomore courses with honors in 1940. He then transferred to the Department of Chemistry at Pomona College, where he completed his senior year and graduated in 1942.

In the fall of 1942, Xiao became a graduate student in the Department of Chemistry at the University of Chicago, studying for a Ph.D. under James Franck. During this period, he worked as a teaching assistant in organic chemistry, physical chemistry, and advanced physical chemistry courses. He earned his doctorate in physical chemistry in March 1946.

After graduation, Xiao was employed as an assistant researcher in the Department of Chemistry at the University of Chicago from January to August 1946. From September 1946 to October 1950, he worked as a researcher at the university’s Metallurgical Laboratory. In November 1950, he joined the basic research catalysis group at Mobil.

While in the United States, Xiao participated in the North American Chinese Student Christian Association and other student organizations. These gatherings were often held at his home, where he was exposed to Marxism-Leninism and other political ideologies. Over time, he developed a strong desire to return to the newly established People's Republic of China. During this period, discussions among Chinese overseas students about whether to return and contribute to China's reconstruction were common. Xiao, influenced by acquaintances who had already returned, eventually decided to follow suit.

U.S. immigration officials attempted to persuade Xiao to stay, offering to complete the formalities for his permanent residency within two to three months, but he declined.

=== Relocation to China ===
In 1950, Xiao Guangyan traveled to China under the guise of being a literature student at the University of Chicago, rather than a Ph.D. holder, to avoid obstruction by U.S. immigration authorities. He departed in November 1950, boarding the President Wilson cruise ship in Los Angeles. After stopping in Honolulu and Manila, he arrived in Hong Kong in late December and reached Beijing in March 1951.

Upon his return, Xiao was assigned to work at the Ministry of Petroleum Industry of the People's Republic of China. After living in Beijing for some time, he moved to Dalian, where he joined the Dalian branch of the Northeast Institute of Science (later the Dalian Institute of Chemical Physics).

Following the outbreak of the Korean War, Chinese society grew increasingly distrustful of intellectuals returning from the United States. During the ideological reform movement of 1951, Xiao faced criticism for discussing his past life in the U.S. and was accused of "worshiping foreigners" and "wooing foreigners." The backlash deeply affected him, leading to mood swings, frequent absences from work as a form of protest, and episodes of taking large doses of sleeping pills. However, after the ideological reform movement subsided, the institute's leadership apologized to him for their previous suspicions, and Xiao resumed his work with dedication despite the earlier hostility.

In early 1956, Xiao was invited to join the newly established Beijing Petroleum Refining Research Institute. After briefly experiencing the work environment in Beijing, he decided to remain in Dalian, believing that its stronger focus on basic research suited him better. While such a choice was common in the United States, it was seen as nonconformist in China, where strict obedience to superiors was expected. As a result, Xiao once again faced scrutiny.

In 1957, during Mao Zedong's Hundred Flowers Campaign, which encouraged citizens to express their opinions on the communist regime, Xiao submitted an article to the Chinese Communist Party Committee Secretary criticizing the widespread ideological self-censorship during the reform movement. However, when the campaign abruptly transitioned into the Anti-Rightist Movement, many intellectuals who had spoken out were labeled as rightists and punished. Xiao, however, was not classified as a rightist.

In 1958, when his Catalytic Process Laboratory was scheduled to be relocated to Lanzhou, Gansu, he requested to stay in Dalian, citing better scientific research conditions. The institute approved his request, but his decision once again went against the prevailing values of Chinese society at the time, which emphasized collective obedience over personal preference.

During the Great Leap Forward, Xiao was subjected to further political criticism under the "pulling out the white flags and planting the red ones in their stead" campaign. His motivations for returning to China, his work ethic, and even his personal habits were questioned. He was accused of being "demanding," "pampered," "greedy," and a "profiteer." Big-character posters attacking him appeared throughout the institute. At a New Year’s celebration, live newspaper dramas mocked him as a clown, ridiculing his words and actions. These relentless criticisms left Xiao deeply distressed and increasingly withdrawn, causing him to suppress his opinions rather than speak out as he once had.

Eventually, political pressure on scientific researchers eased, and in 1961, the institute's leadership once again apologized to Xiao. He resumed his work despite the previous mistreatment.

=== Persecution and suicide ===
During the movement to purify the class ranks in the Cultural Revolution, Xiao Guangyan was labeled a "counter-revolutionary agent." He was publicly denounced and criticized through big-character posters and was forced to relocate to different neighborhoods.

On October 5, 1968, his home was ransacked by the Workers' Propaganda Team, and he was imprisoned in a bullpen—a detention facility for intellectuals during the Cultural Revolution. There, he was subjected to intense persecution. The Workers' Propaganda Team accused him of being a member of a secret service agency, prompting others to join in his denunciation. He was repeatedly interrogated and tortured, enduring beatings and other forms of physical abuse. Under pressure, he was forced to write repeated confessions and admit to fabricated crimes.

On the morning of December 11, 1968, Xiao Guangyan was found dead. An autopsy determined that he had died by suicide after ingesting barbital.

== Personal life ==
Xiao Guangyan married Zhen Suhui in 1945. Born and raised in the United States, Zhen Suhui did not speak Chinese. Her father had previously served as Sun Yat-sen's secretary and was later sent by the Nationalist government to work as an expatriate in the United States.

Zhen initially resisted Xiao’s decision to move to China, citing both the language barrier and the country’s political climate. However, Xiao was determined to return and even suggested that he go alone while she remained in the United States. Eventually, she relented and accompanied him. In China, she worked as an English teacher at Dalian Maritime University. Throughout Xiao’s political struggles, Zhen provided him with emotional support and understanding. In 1952, the couple had a daughter, Xiao Luolin (nicknamed "Lolo").

During the Cultural Revolution, Zhen was assigned to perform labor at Dalian Yingchengzi Farm, leaving their daughter alone at home. After Xiao Guangyan's suicide, the Workers' Propaganda Team summoned Zhen to the Dahua Office to inform her of her husband's death. She remained calm and requested two days off to care for her daughter.

On December 13, 1968, Zhen Suhui and Xiao Luolin died by suicide, ingesting barbital while embracing each other in bed.

== Rehabilitation ==
Following Xiao Guangyan's death, he was accused of being the central figure in the so-called "301 Special Agent Group." His case, known as the "301 Case," was considered a major political incident and was later promoted as a model example of the "working class taking control of scientific research institutions." The Workers' Propaganda Team described his death as "the inevitable choice of a desperate class enemy" and "a great victory for the dictatorship of the proletariat." His death was even announced as "extraordinarily good news" to members of the Chinese Academy of Sciences, and he was officially classified as a "counter-revolutionary agent."

Xiao's former friend Bai Jiefu later stated that Premier Zhou Enlai personally requested to be informed about his death and pursued accountability for those involved. Ultimately, two members of the Workers' Propaganda Team—one of whom was the leader and the other the main perpetrator of Xiao's beatings—were punished.

In August 1972, Lin Daguang, a former friend of Xiao and a professor at McGill University, visited China and was received by Zhou Enlai. During their meeting, Lin brought up Xiao’s persecution during the Cultural Revolution. Zhou reportedly responded that if Xiao had indeed been wronged, he should be rehabilitated.

On September 9, 1972, the Chinese Communist Party Committee of the Dalian Institute of Chemical Physics, Chinese Academy of Sciences, issued an official report titled Examination Conclusions on Xiao Guangyan’s Historical Issues. The report dismissed the allegations against him as false, declaring that his return to China had been motivated by patriotism. It praised his dedication to the Communist Party and the socialist system, acknowledging his contributions to the country during his lifetime.

On March 11, 1978, a memorial service for Xiao Guangyan was held in the auditorium of the Dalian Institute of Chemical Physics. In his speech, the institute’s director stated:

"Comrade Xiao Guangyan loved Chairman Mao, loved the Communist Party, and loved socialism. He made significant contributions and was a talented individual. His death was a major loss to the institute’s scientific research efforts."

Following these proceedings, Xiao Guangyan was fully rehabilitated in the People's Republic of China.
