= Shen-su Sun =

Chinese-born Australian geochemist (1943–2005)

Shen-su Sun (Chinese: 孫賢鉥; pinyin: Sūn Xiánshù; 27 October 1943 – 5 March 2005) was a Chinese-born Australian geochemist.

Sun was born in Fuzhou, Fujian, China. He earned his bachelor's degree in geology from National Taiwan University, and obtained his Ph.D. from Columbia University in 1973. From 1981 to 1999, he was a research professor in Bureau of Mineral Resources of Australia. He did significant work in lead, oxygen and sulfur isotope geochemistry.

Sun died in Canberra, Australia on 5 March 2005.
