= Jiang Guhuai =

Jiang Guhuai (1880–1958), courtesy name Boxiu and later pseudonym Quewei, was a native of Houguan County, Fuzhou Prefecture, Fujian Province. He was a famous scholar in the late Qing Dynasty, a poet, calligrapher, and jurist in modern China. He wrote thousands of poems in his lifetime, and left behind a handwritten collection of poems, "Quewei Tower Poetry Collection".

== Biography ==
Jiang Guhuai was a juren in the year of Guimao (1903) during the reign of Emperor Guangxu of the Qing Dynasty. He studied in Japan and majored in law. He graduated from the private political science university in Japan and was awarded the title of the best student. In the second year of the Xuantong reign (1909), he participated in the imperial examination for overseas students set up by the Qing court and achieved the best results. He was awarded the title of Jinshi in the law and politics department and was appointed as an editor of the Hanlin Academy. He was an important poet of the Tongguang style poetry school in modern China and an important member of the poetry society founded by Chen Yan.

He graduated from Waseda University in Japan. After returning to China, he served as a teacher at the Fuzhou Law School. After the Revolution of 1911, he served as secretary of the Ministry of Foreign Affairs of the Fujian Governor's Office and governor of Fu'an, Jian'ou, and Gutian counties in Fujian. Later, he practiced law in Fuzhou. After 1933, he served as the major general director of the Military Law Department of the Gansu Pacification Office and the secretary of the provincial government. After the outbreak of the Anti-Japanese War in 1937, he joined the Japanese puppet regime. He initially served as secretary of the Executive Yuan of the North China Provisional Government. In April 1939, he served as a counselor of the Ministry of Justice of the Reform Government. From April 1940 to February 1945, he served as a member of the Supervisory Committee of the Wang Jingwei regime. In February 1945, he served as a member of the Legislative Yuan of the Wang Jingwei regime.

== Book ==
Jiang Guhuai, Lecture Notes on the General Theory of Criminal Law

Jiang Guhuai, Collection of Poems from Queyulou
