= Ni Shu =

Ni Shu (Chinese: 倪曙), courtesy name Mengxi (孟曦), was an official of the Chinese Tang dynasty and the Five Dynasties and Ten Kingdoms period state Southern Han, serving as a chancellor during Southern Han.

== Biography ==
=== Early life ===
It is not known when Ni Shu was born, but it is known that his family was from Houguan (侯官, in modern Fuzhou, Fujian).

=== Tang dynasty political career ===
He was nominated for the imperial examinations in the Jinshi class in 877, during the reign of Emperor Xizong of Tang, and went to the Tang dynasty capital Jingzhao Municipality (京兆, i.e., Chang'an) to be tested. At that time, the mayor of Jingzhao, Cui Yu (崔淯), was reinstitution a custom where nominated Jinshi examinees first had to go through a qualifying examination, and he had the sheriff of one of Chang'an's counties, Wannian (萬年), test the examinees on poetry. Ni ranked fifth on this examination, which apparently did not qualify him for further examination at that point. He resubmitted himself for Jinshi examinations during Emperor Xizong's Zhonghe era (881–885), and he passed the examinations. He was then made Taixue Boshi (太學博士), a professor at the imperial university. His writing was said to be elegant and known to Emperor Xizong, and his poetry was particularly known. Later in Emperor Xizong's reign, with the imperial realm being engulfed in Huang Chao's rebellion, Ni left his post without leave and went home to Fu Prefecture (福州), which Houguan belonged to.

=== Subsequent life and career ===
After Ni Shu returned to Fu Prefecture, there was a time when Wang Yanbin (王延彬), the nephew of Wang Shenzhi the military governor of Weiwu Circuit (威武, headquartered in modern Fuzhou), was the prefect of Quan Prefecture (泉州, in modern Quanzhou, Fujian). Wang Yanbin invited many guests to his headquarters, and Ni, along with other Jinshi examinees Xu Yin (徐寅) and Chen Tan (陳郯) became his guests, often spending time writing and reciting poetry, as well as drinking.

After a long period of being Wang Yanbin's guest, Ni decided to take a journey to the Lingnan region. Liu Yin, who then ruled the region as the military governor of Qinghai Circuit (清海, headquartered in modern Guangzhou, Guangdong), had long heard of Ni, and he welcomed Ni and treated him well. Ni therefore remained to serve on Liu's staff.

After Liu Yin's death, Liu's brother Liu Yan took over the region, and proclaimed an independent state of Southern Han as its Emperor Gaozu in 917. He made Ni the deputy minister of public works (工部侍郎, Gongbu Shilang), and then Shangshu Zuocheng (尚書左丞), one of the secretaries general of the executive bureau of government (尚書省, Shangshu Sheng). In 921, he gave Ni the designation Tong Zhongshu Menxia Pingzhangshi (同中書門下平章事), making Ni a chancellor. That was the last recorded act involving Ni, who was said to later die in office as chancellor. It was said that Ni was capable of administering imperial examinations, and that he compiled a volume of his poetry.

== Notes and references ==
- Zizhi Tongjian, vol. 271.
- Book of Southern Han (南漢書), vol. 3.
- Spring and Autumn Annals of the Ten Kingdoms (十國春秋), vol. 62.
