= Gutian dialect =

Eastern Min Chinese dialect

Gutian
- Kŭ-chèng-uâ / 古田話
- Native to: Southern China, Malaysia
- Region: Gutian, Ningde, Fujian; Sibu, Sarawak; Sitiawan, Manjung, Perak
- Language family: Sino-Tibetan: Sinitic; Chinese; Min; Coastal Min; Eastern Min; Gutian
- Early forms: Proto-Sino-Tibetan: Old Chinese (Note: Min is believed to have split from Old Chinese, rather than Middle Chinese like other varieties of Chinese.); Proto-Min

Language codes
- ISO 639-3: –
- Glottolog: None
- Linguasphere: 79-AAA-ich

The Gutian dialect (Eastern Min: 古田話) is a dialect of Eastern Min spoken in Gutian, Ningde in northeastern Fujian province, China.

== Phonology ==
The Gutian dialect has 15 initials, 52 rimes and 7 tones.

=== Initials ===
		Bilabial	Alveolar	Lateral	Velar	Glottal
Stop	Tenuis voiceless	p	t		k	ʔ
Stop	Aspirated voiceless	pʰ	tʰ		kʰ	
Nasal		m	n		ŋ	
Fricative	Voiceless		s			h
Fricative	voiced	β	ʒ			
Affricate	Tenuis voiceless		ts			
Affricate	Aspirated voiceless		tsʰ			
Approximant				l		

=== Rimes ===
a 嘉	ɛ 西	œ 初	o 歌
i 之	u 孤	y 須	
ai 開	oi 催	au 郊	ɛu 抖
ia 遮	ie 批	iu 秋	iau 燒
ua 花	uo 過	uai 歪	ui 輝
uɔi 杯	yø 橋		
aɳ 山	iɳ 賓	uɳ 春	yŋ 銀
iaŋ 聲	ieŋ 天	uaŋ 歡	uoŋ 元
yøŋ 香	eiŋ 燈	ouŋ 郎	øyŋ 東
ak 答	ik 必	uk 不	yk 竹
iak 揭	iek 哲	uak 撥	uok 拙
yøk 箬	eik 八	ouk 駁	øyk 北
aʔ 拍	œʔ 嗝	oʔ 桌	iaʔ 壁
uaʔ 劃	uoʔ 剝	yøʔ 藥	

=== Tones ===
No.	1	2	3	4	5	6	7
Tone name	dark level 陰平	light level 陽平	rising 上聲	dark departing 陰去	light departing 陽去	dark entering 陰入	light entering 陽入
Tone contour	˥ (55)	˧ (33)	˦˨ (42)	˨˩ (21)	˧˨˦ (324)	˨ (2)	˥ (5)

=== Initial assimilation ===
The two-syllable initial assimilation rules are shown in the table below:

The Coda of the Former Syllable	The Initial Assimilation of the Latter Syllable
Null coda or /-ʔ/	/p/ and /pʰ/ change to /β/; /t/, /tʰ/ and /s/ change to /l/; /k/, /kʰ/ and /h/ change to null initial (without /ʔ/); /ts/ and /tsʰ/ change to /ʒ/; /m/, /n/, /ŋ/ and the null initial remain unchanged.
/-ŋ/	/p/ and /pʰ/ change to /m/; /t/, /tʰ/ /s/ and /l/ change to /n/; /k/, /kʰ/, /h/ and the null initial change to /ŋ/; /ts/ and /tsʰ/ change to /ʒ/; /m/, /n/ and /ŋ/ remain unchanged.
/-k̚/	All initials remain unchanged.

=== Tone sandhi ===
The two-syllable tonal sandhi rules are shown in the table below (the rows give the first syllable's original citation tone, while the columns give the citation tone of the second syllable):

	dark level 55	light level 33	rising 42	dark departing 21	light departing 324	dark entering 2	light entering 5
dark level 55	21+55	21+33	21+42	24+21	24+544	24+2	21+5
light level 33			21+42	21+21	21+324	21+2	
rising 42	21+55	21+24	21+42	24+21	24+544	24+2	21+5
dark departing 21	33+55	33+544	33+53	24+21	55+33	55+2	33+5
light departing 324	55+55	544+33	544+42	42+21	544+21	42+2	55+5
dark entering 2	33+55	33+55	33+53	55+21	55+33	55+2	55+5
light entering 5	33+55	21+33	21+42	21+21	21+324	21+2	33+5
