= Hu Haiyan =

President of Beijing Institute of Technology

Hu Haiyan (Chinese: 胡海岩; born 1956) is president of Beijing Institute of Technology. He is a fellow of the Chinese Academy of Sciences and a leading scientist in mechanics.

== Biography ==
He graduated with PhD from the Nanjing Aeronautics and Astronautics University. He was a researcher at the University of Stuttgart from 1992 to 1994. He was a visiting professor at Duke University from 1996 to 1997. He previously served as president of the Nanjing Aeronautics and Astronautics University. He was appointed as president of Beijing Institute of Technology in 2007.
