= Xue Shaohui =

Qing period Chinese poet, translator and educator

Xue Shaohui (薛紹徽) (1866–1911) was a Chinese poet, translator and educator of the late Qing period.

== Life ==
Xue Shaohui was born in Fuzhou, a port city with a naval academy, Fuzhou Naval College. Xue was a recognized poet at thirteen. Aged fourteen she married Chen Shoupeng, brother of the diplomat Chen Jitong.
