= Huang Rulun =

Chinese billionaire businessman (born 1951)

- 黄如论
- Born: 1951 (age 74–75); Lianjiang County, Fujian, China
- Occupation: Real estate developer
- Known for: Century Golden Resources Group
- Spouse: Married
- Children: 2

Huang Rulun (Chinese: 黄如论; born 1951) is a Chinese billionaire businessman. He is head of the privately held real estate developer Century Golden Resources Group. In June 2018, Forbes estimated his net worth at $4.0 billion.

== Early life ==
Huang was born to a poor family in Lianjiang County, Fujian, China. Huang initially worked as a street vendor in China.

== Business career ==
=== As a trader in the Philippines ===
In 1986, Huang went to the Philippines, where he worked as a trader.

=== Return to China ===
At age 40, Huang moved back to China and established the Century Golden Resources Group. His company had a joint venture with the local government of Fuzhou to build his first project, the Guotai Tower amidst a commercial property boom in Southern China in the early 1990s. Huang built more commercial properties in the next three years. During this period he also started to build residential projects before new restrictions on commercial development was imposed in 1994. Huang did not rely much on outside financing, preferring to use his own capital. He became the largest private developer in Fuzhou.

He returned to focus on Beijing as a developer in 1998. He initially supported the Shiji Jiayuan housing development, then invested 17 billion Rmb in the Century City project. In 2004, he completed the Beijing Golden Resource Shopping Mall. The mall was next to Century City, a residential area. This model was repeated in Kunming, Changsha, Guiyang, and Hefei.

According to the Financial Times, he played a "central role in the revival of his country's ties with the Philippines." He funded drug treatment centers during the administration of President Rodrigo Duterte in 2016. Both treatment centers were hailed by Duterte as a sign of Chinese friendship, with Huang not offering details, and saying he was funding the centers to improve ties between the two nations. According to Duterte, Huang did not ask for anything in return for the mega facility.

In October 2016, Chinese state media said that Huang's company had paid bribes to Bai Enpai, the party secretary of Yunnan Province. In June 2017, it was announced that he was being investigated by the state over corruption allegations. That week, he was removed from his role in Fujian province political consultative conference. He was also arrested.

He has donated money to Peking University and other schools.

As of 2016, he had invested in around 20 five-star hotels and 10 malls.

== Personal life ==
Huang is married with two children, and lives in Beijing, China.
