= Daniel Bambang Dwi Byantoro =

Indonesian bishop and founder of Indonesian Orthodox Church

Daniel Bambang Dwi Byantoro 曹衡进
- Bishop of Nikopolis (Jakarta)
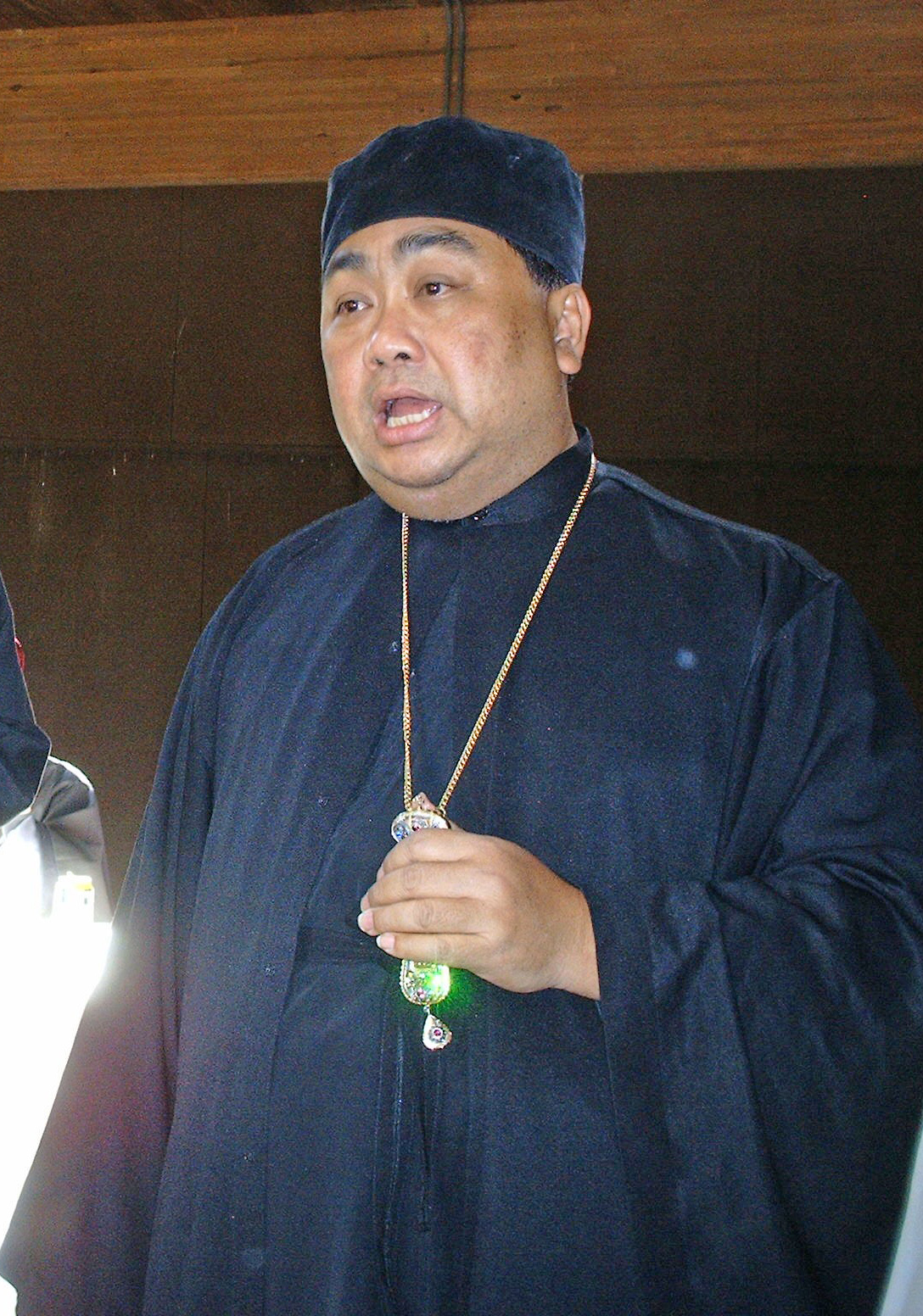
- Church: Indonesian Orthodox Church
- Appointed: 1990
- Predecessor: Office established
- Successor: Incumbent

Orders
- Rank: Bishop

Personal details
- Born: Daniel Bambang Dwi Byantoro; 1956 (age 69–70) Java, Indonesia
- Denomination: Eastern Orthodox Church (early Sunni Islam, previously Protestantism)
- Education: Protestant Theological Seminary, the Asian Center for Theological Studies and Mission

Daniel Bambang Dwi Byantoro (Chinese: 曹衡进; pinyin: Cáo Héngjìn; born in Java, 1956) is an Indonesian bishop as well as founder of the Indonesian Orthodox Church. He served in Most Holy Trinity Parish, Banjarsari, Surakarta and Sts. Peter and Paul Parish in Jalan Lengkong Raya, Serpong, South Tangerang, Banten.

== Early life ==
Byantoro was born to a middle-class family in Indonesia. He was brought up by his maternal grandfather. He studied the Koran, and received Islamic teaching. According to his claim, he was converted to Charismatic Christianity, when Christ appeared to him during his evening Islamic prayers.

In 1978, Byantoro studied in Protestant Theological Seminary, the Asian Center for Theological Studies and Mission, (ACTS) in Seoul, South Korea. In 1982, he found The Orthodox Church by Kallistos Ware in a bookshop in Seoul, who introduced the Eastern Orthodox Church to him. On September 6, 1983, he converted to the Orthodox Church with the blessing of Ecumenical Patriarch of Constantinople, Patriarch Demetrios and Metropolitan Bishop Dionysius of New Zealand and chrismated by Archimandrite Sotirios Trambas (Zelon Bishop, serving in Korea).

Byantoro completed his education in Korea, then travelled to Greece and the United States before returning to Indonesia.

== Ministry ==
On June 8, 1988, Byantoro began ministry in Indonesia. The first person who he converted to Orthodox Church was an ex-Muslim man named Muhammed Sugi Bassari, baptized as Photios, in April 1989.

== Thought ==
Theologically speaking, Byantoro has used the existing thought patterns of Indonesian culture to package Orthodox teaching within the Indonesian mental set up. Just as the Church Fathers had to face Greek paganism, Judaism, and Gnosticism in order to present the Gospel intelligibly to ancient peoples, Orthodox theology faces similar challenges in the context of the Indonesian mission. Those challenges are the Islamic strand that has similarities with Judaism (both Judaism and Islam have similarities with not only each other but also Christianity as all three are Abrahamic religions from their common spiritual origin from the monotheism promoted by Abraham), the Hindu-Buddhistic strand that has similarities with Greek paganism (both Hinduism and Greek paganism have their origins in Proto-Indo-European religion), the Javanese-mystical strand called Kebatinan (the Esoteric Belief) that has similarities to Gnosticism (it is divided into many mystical denominations and groups) and the secularistic-materialistic strand of the modern world.

== Jurisdictional changes and episcopal consecration ==
Though not canonically released from the Orthodox Metropolitanate of Hong Kong and Southeast Asia, Byantoro is officially regarded as defrocked by OMHKSEA In 2019, he and some of the clergy left ROCOR for the Church of the Genuine Orthodox Christians of Greece. In 2023, he was consecrated bishop of Jakarta.

Eastern Orthodox Church titles
Preceded by Position established	Archimandrite of Indonesia of the Indonesia Orthodox Church; 1990–2019	Succeeded by N/A
