= Century Golden Resources Group =

Chinese real estate company

- Company type: Private
- Industry: Real estate
- Founded: 1991; 35 years ago
- Founder: Huang Rulun
- Revenue: $5 billion (2013)
- Number of employees: 20,000
- Website: grgroup.com.cn

Century Golden Resources Group is a Chinese privately held real estate development company.

It is headed by the Chinese billionaire Huang Rulun and has over 20,000 employees. The company has invested in 20 five-star hotels and 10 shopping malls, with revenues in 2013 of nearly $5 billion.
