= Indonesian Orthodox Church (Old Calendarist) =

Christian denomination

Diocese of Indonesian Orthodox Church Ινδονησιακή Ορθόδοξη Εκκλησία Gereja Ortodoks Indonesia
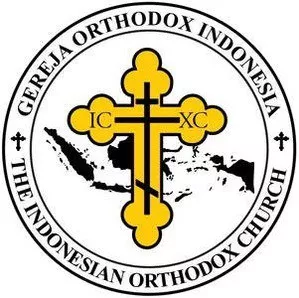

Location
- Country: Indonesia
- Headquarters: Jakarta, Indonesia

Statistics
- Churches: 9
- Congregations: 15
- Schools: 1
- Members: Around 10.000

Information
- Denomination: Old Calendarists
- Rite: Byzantine Rite
- Established: 1991
- Language: Indonesian, English, Greek, Malay
- Calendar: Julian

Current leadership
- Parent church: Church of the Genuine Orthodox Christians of Greece
- Major Archbishop: Archbishop Kallinikos of Athens and All Greece
- Episkop: Bishop Daniel from Nikopolis

Website
- GOI website

The Indonesian Orthodox Church (GOI; Indonesian: Gereja Ortodoks Indonesia) is a diocese which has been under the jurisdiction of the Church of the Genuine Orthodox Christians of Greece since 2019. The theology and praxis of the church are essentially the same as any other Eastern Orthodox Church. However, they are not in communion with the larger body of Eastern Orthodox Christians. The legal entity of the Indonesian Orthodox Church was founded and is still managed in day-to-day affairs by Daniel Bambang Dwi Byantoro. Its history is in many ways inseparable from his own.

== History ==
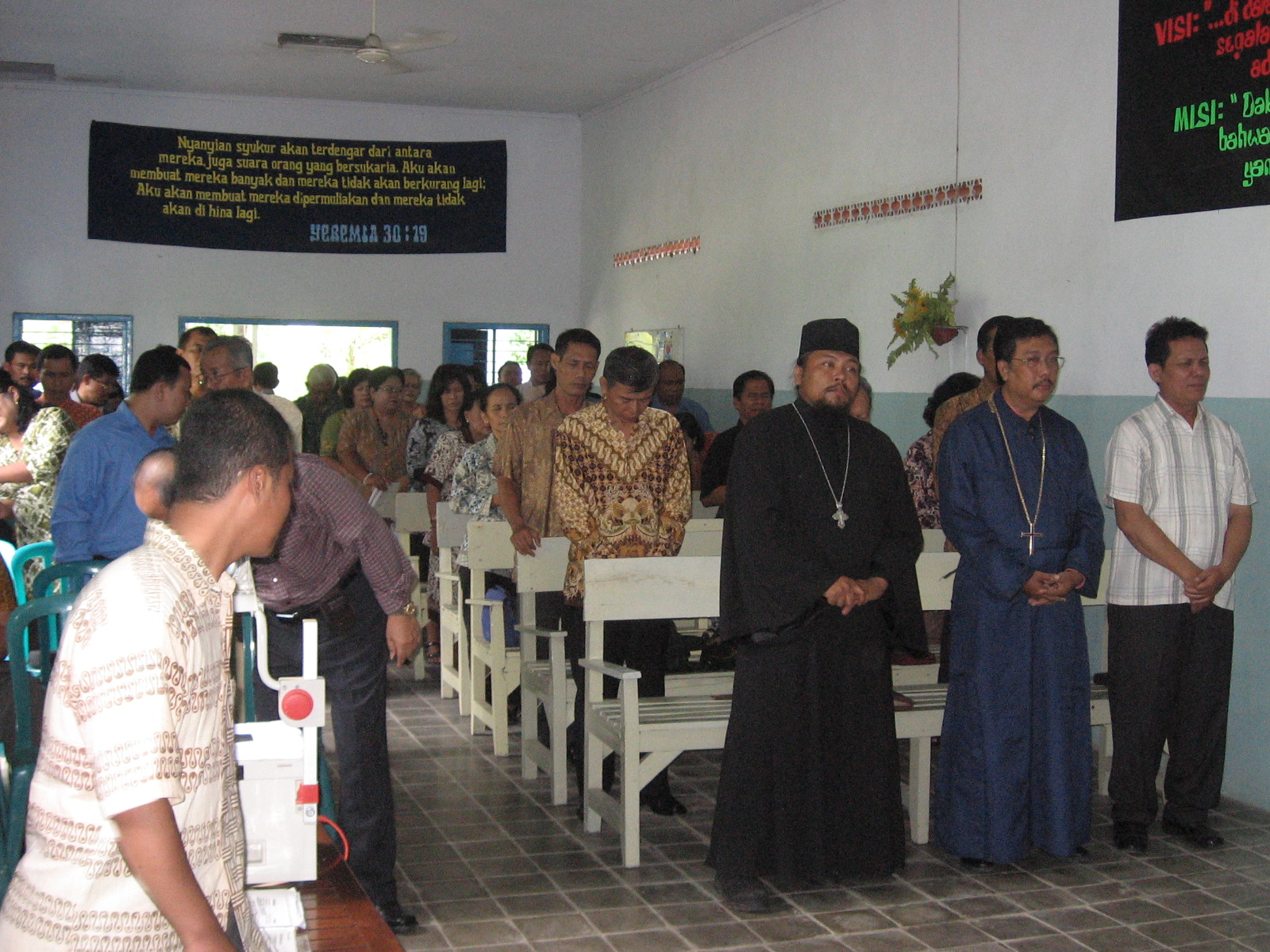
Indonesian Orthodox worshipers in Surabaya in 2011

The GOI was founded in 1991 after missionary work began in 1988 by Daniel Byantoro, who converted to Christianity from Islam in the mid-1970s and discovered Eastern Orthodoxy through Bishop Kallistos Ware's book The Orthodox Church while studying at a Protestant seminary in Seoul, Korea, in 1982. He was chrismated into the Orthodox Church by Archimandrite Sotirios Trambas in Korea in September 1983. In 1984, he spent some time on Mount Athos and then travelled to the US, where he studied in various theological schools. He was ordained a priest by Metropolitan Maximos of Pittsburgh, under the jurisdiction of the Ecumenical Patriarch, sometime between 1985 and 1987, before returning to Indonesia to begin establishing roots for the Orthodox Church there.

In September 1996, the Ecumenical Patriarch founded the Metropolitanate of Hong Kong and Southeast Asia, which became the de facto governing diocese in Indonesia. Through donations from parishes in the US and Greece, the GOI constructed its first permanent church building in Surakarta, a culturally significant city in the heart of Java.

In the period between 1996 and 2004, the GOI was under the guidance of then-Metropolitan Nikitas Loulias. There were various struggles between the Metropolitan and Byantoro regarding canonicity, financial propriety, and handling of Church properties, which led to Byantoro being defrocked by the Ecumenical Patriarch.

In 2005, Byantoro was received into ROCOR and appointed as Archimandrite by Metropolitan Hilarion. In May of 2007 ROCOR reunited with the Moscow Patriarchate after 80 years of separation following the Bolshevik revolution in Russia.

In 2019, for reasons that remain unclear but likely related to Byantoro's public calls for the GOI to be more culturally Indonesian and more self-governing, the GOI was received into the Genuine Greek Orthodox Church. This Old Calendarist group is not in communion with the rest of the Orthodox world. This caused a rift in the laity and clergy in Indonesia, and both the Moscow Patriarchate and the Ecumenical Patriarch founded new churches across the archipelago to receive those who were not willing to go along with the move.

== Structure ==
Currently, GOI consists of 9 parishes and 6 communities spread across various cities in Indonesia.
