= Guo Kexin =

Chinese chemical engineer, physicist, metallurgist, and crystallographer

- 郭可信
- Born: August 23, 1923
- Died: December 13, 2006 (aged 83)

Academic background
- Education: Zhejiang University

Academic work
- Sub-discipline: Electron microscopy

Guo Kexin (Chinese: 郭可信; 1923–2006), also known as Ke-Xin Guo or K. H. Kuo (Ke-Hsin Kuo), was a Chinese chemical engineer, physicist, metallurgist and crystallographer. He was an academician of the Chinese Academy of Sciences, and is a pioneer of electron microscopy in China.

== Life ==
Guo was born on August 23, 1923. In 1941, he graduated from Chongqing Nankai Middle School. He graduated from Zhejiang University in 1946 with a Bachelor of Engineering degree in chemical engineering. In 1947, Guo went to study in Sweden.

Guo was the Director and a senior researcher at the Beijing Electron Microscope Open Laboratory (a.k.a. Beijing Laboratory of Electron Microscopy) and the Center for Condensed Matter Physics and the Institute of Physics, Chinese Academy of Sciences. Guo was the main founder of the Chinese Society for Electron Microscopy (a.k.a. Chinese Electron Microscopy Society, CEMS; 中国电子显微镜会), and served as its Director/President from 1982 to 1996.

== Recognition ==
In 1980, Guo was elected as a member of the Chinese Academy of Sciences. He was also a foreign member of the Royal Swedish Academy of Engineering Sciences (IVA), and received an Honorary Doctorate from the Royal Institute of Technology (KTH), Sweden.

The K. H. Kuo Education Fund is named after him.

== Archive ==
- Electron microscopy of aperiodic materials Invited and contributed papers from a symposium at the ICEM14, Cancun, Mexico, 3 September 1998, in honour of Professor K.H. Kuo - by Lian-Mao Peng and J. L. Aragón
