= Tsai Ding Hsin =

Chinese poet and calligraphy master (1920–2015)

- Traditional Chinese: 蔡鼎新
- Simplified Chinese: 蔡鼎新
Transcriptions

Tsai Ding Hsin (December 10, 1920 – January 20, 2015) was a Chinese calligraphy master, artist and poet of classical Chinese poetry in Taiwan.
