= Fu Chengyi =

- 傅承义
- Born: 7 October 1909; Minhou County, Fujian, Qing China
- Died: 8 January 2000 (aged 90); Beijing, China
- Education: Tsinghua University; McGill University; California Institute of Technology
- Scientific career
- Fields: Geophysics
- Workplaces: University of Science and Technology of China
- Doctoral advisor: Beno Gutenberg
- Other academic advisors: D. A. Keys

Chinese name
- Simplified Chinese: 傅承义
- Traditional Chinese: 傅承義
Transcriptions
Standard Mandarin
- Hanyu Pinyin: Fù Chéngyì

Fu Chengyi (7 October 1909 – 8 January 2000) was a Chinese geophysicist and an academician of the Chinese Academy of Sciences.

== Biography ==
Fu was born into an official family in Minhou County, Fuzhou, on 7 October 1909. His father Fu Yangxian (傅仰贤) was a diplomat in the Beiyang government. He had three siblings. His elder brother Fu Ying (傅鹰) was a chemist and vice president of Peking University. He elementary studied at Beijing Yuying Middle School (北京育英中学) and secondary studied at Huiwen High School (汇文中学). In 1929, he was accepted to Tsinghua University, majoring in the Department of Physics. After graduating in 1933, he stayed at the university and worked as assistant there. In 1938, he was recruited by the National Southwestern Associated University as an instructor.

In 1939, he was admitted to the UK overseas student at government scholarships, but he did not make the trip because of the outbreak of World War II. In 1940, he entered the Department of Physics, McGill University in Canada and studied geophysical exploration under the supervision of D. A. Keys, and received his master's degree in physics in 1941. In 1942, D. A. Keys recommended him to the Graduate School of California Institute of Technology to study geophysics and seismology under the guidance of Beno Gutenberg, a leader in modern geophysics. He earned his doctor's degree in physics in 1946. After university, he worked as a technical consultant in several oil and geophysical exploration companies. In 1946, he was hired by California Institute of Technology as an assistant professor.

In the spring of 1947, he received a letter from Zhao Jiuzhang, his university classmate and director of the Institute of Meteorology of the Academia Sinica, hoping him would return to China to preside over the geophysical research work of the Institute of Meteorology. Two weeks later, he returned to China and became a senior researcher in the Institute of Meteorology and a professor in the Department of Physics, Central University (now Southeast University). After the Chinese Civil War, the Nationalist government wanted him to go to Taiwan, but he refused.

In April 1950, the Chinese Academy of Sciences founded the Institute of Geophysics, Fu served as a researcher. In 1953, he moved to Beijing Institute of Geology (now China University of Geosciences (Beijing)), where he established the first geophysical teaching and research office in China. He also helped set up a teaching and research office of geophysics in Peking University in 1956. Fu joined the faculty of the University of Science and Technology of China in 1964, he established the teaching and research office of geophysics of which he himself served as the first director. In 1972, he founded the Focal Physics Research Office at the university. He joined the Communist Party in 1981.

On 8 January 2000, he died of illness in Beijing, aged 90.

He was a member of the 2nd, 5th and 6th National Committee of the Chinese People's Political Consultative Conference. He was a delegate to the 3rd National People's Congress.

== Honours and awards ==
- 1957 Member of the Chinese Academy of Sciences (CAS)
