= Pingnan County, Fujian =

Pingnan County 屏南县
- County
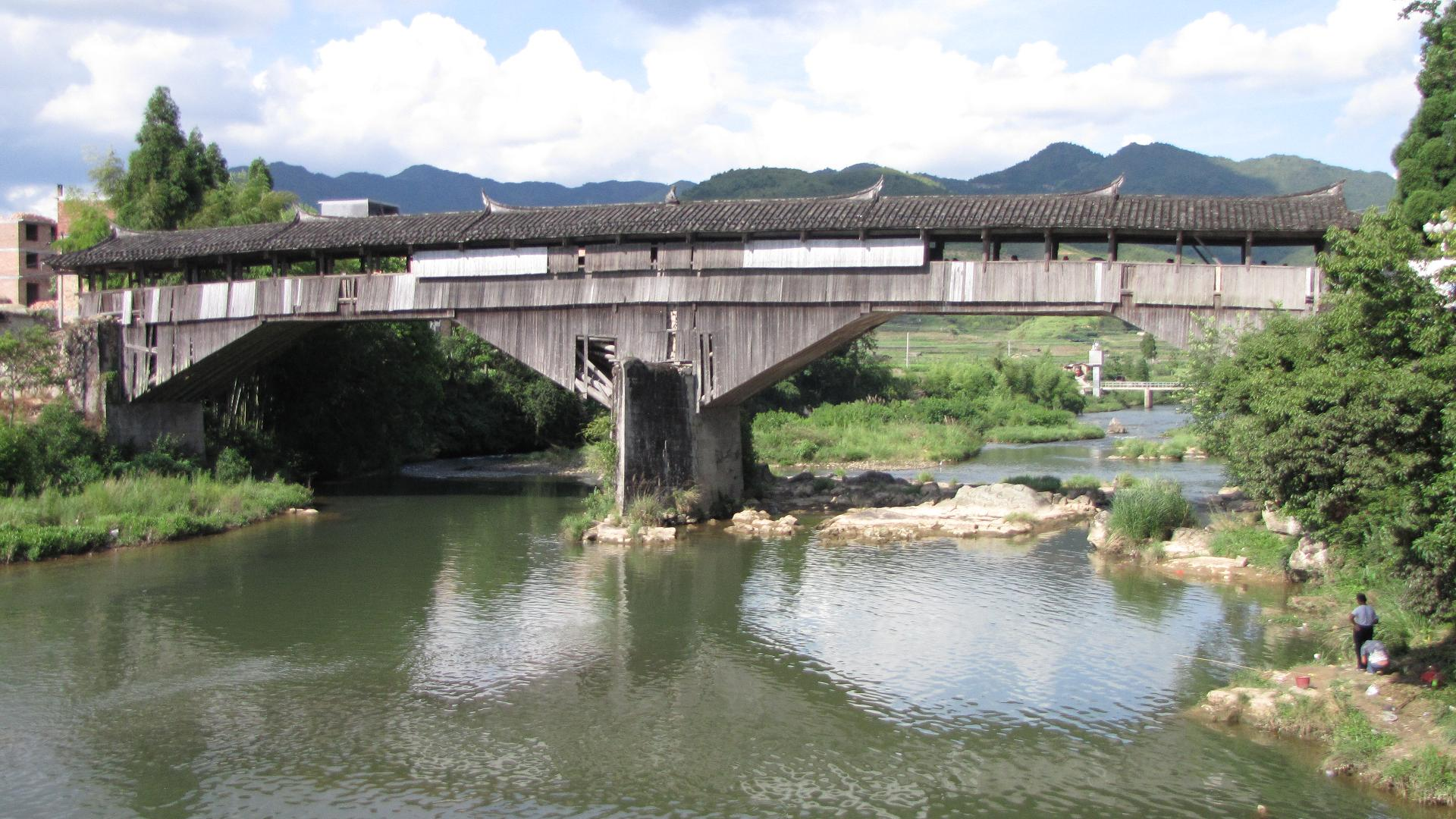

- Location of the seat in Fujian
- Coordinates: 26°54′29″N 118°59′10″E
- Country: People's Republic of China
- Province: Fujian
- Prefecture-level city: Ningde

Area
  - Total: 1,487 km^{2} (574 sq mi)

Population (2020)
  - Total: 139,815
  - Density: 94.02/km^{2} (243.5/sq mi)
- Time zone: UTC+8 (China Standard)

Pingnan County (simplified Chinese: 屏南县; traditional Chinese: 屏南縣; pinyin: Píngnán Xiàn) is an inland county in northeastern Fujian Province, People's Republic of China. It is located in the cultural region of Mindong (闽东), and lies in the west of Ningde City.

== Administration ==
The population of Pingnan stands at 139,815 residents, of whom 68,975 are urban resident. (2020)

The county covers an area of 1,485 square kilometres (573 sq mi), divided into four towns (镇; zhèn) and seven townships (乡; xiāng). The county executive, legislature and judiciary are seated at Gufeng Town (古峰镇), together with the CPC and PSB branches.

=== Towns ===
- Gufeng (古峰镇)
- Shuangxi (双溪镇)
- Daixi (黛溪镇)
- Changqiao (长桥镇)

=== Townships ===
- Pingcheng (屏城乡)
- Tangkou (棠口乡)
- Gantang (甘棠乡)
- Yiling (熙岭乡)
- Luxia (路下乡)
- Shoushan (寿山乡)
- Lingxia (岭下乡)

== Climate ==
Climate data for Pingnan, elevation 870 m (2,850 ft), (1991–2020 normals)
Month	Jan	Feb	Mar	Apr	May	Jun	Jul	Aug	Sep	Oct	Nov	Dec	Year
Mean daily maximum °C (°F)	11.8 (53.2)	13.3 (55.9)	16.2 (61.2)	20.9 (69.6)	24.2 (75.6)	26.8 (80.2)	29.7 (85.5)	29.0 (84.2)	26.3 (79.3)	22.4 (72.3)	18.1 (64.6)	13.7 (56.7)	21.0 (69.9)
Daily mean °C (°F)	6.3 (43.3)	7.7 (45.9)	10.7 (51.3)	15.4 (59.7)	19.1 (66.4)	22.2 (72.0)	24.4 (75.9)	23.8 (74.8)	21.3 (70.3)	16.9 (62.4)	12.6 (54.7)	7.9 (46.2)	15.7 (60.2)
Mean daily minimum °C (°F)	2.8 (37.0)	4.1 (39.4)	6.8 (44.2)	11.3 (52.3)	15.4 (59.7)	19.1 (66.4)	20.8 (69.4)	20.4 (68.7)	17.9 (64.2)	13.1 (55.6)	8.9 (48.0)	4.1 (39.4)	12.1 (53.7)
Average precipitation mm (inches)	76.1 (3.00)	106.4 (4.19)	198.7 (7.82)	182.3 (7.18)	252.3 (9.93)	338.8 (13.34)	190.9 (7.52)	212.1 (8.35)	133.9 (5.27)	58.2 (2.29)	69.0 (2.72)	59.2 (2.33)	1,877.9 (73.94)
Average precipitation days (≥ 0.1 mm)	14.1	15.6	19.1	18.0	19.7	20.3	15.3	18.5	14.2	9.4	10.9	10.9	186
Average snowy days	1.7	1.7	0.4	0	0	0	0	0	0	0	0	0.4	4.2
Average relative humidity (%)	82	83	83	81	82	84	80	83	82	79	81	79	82
Mean monthly sunshine hours	110.3	97.8	105.5	122.8	125.8	126.5	208.2	174.8	149.2	158.2	126.3	131.3	1,636.7
Percentage possible sunshine	33	31	28	32	30	31	50	43	41	45	39	41	37
Source: China Meteorological Administration

== History ==
Pingnan was established as a county by court of the Qing Dynasty in 1735.

Local historical monuments include the Wan'an Bridge, located in the appropriately named Changqiao ("long bridge") Township. The bridge, described as the "longest woven timber bridge in China", was originally built in 1648, and rebuilt a number of times since.

== Agriculture ==
Pingnan is "the capital of summer mushrooms", and the annual produce of Xiangu mushrooms is more than 6,000 tons. It is the largest export base of summer mushrooms in China. Pingnan is also famous for fruits such as Younai plums, seedless persimmons, chinquapis, yangtaos, and Wuyan peas.

== See also ==
- Ningde
- Eastern Min dialect
- Mindong people
- Fujian
