= Fanshan =

Fánshān (矾山镇) may refer to the following locations in China:

- Fanshan, Lujiang County, town in Lujiang County, Anhui
- Fanshan, Zhuolu County, town in northwestern Hebei
- Fanshan, Cangnan County, town in Cangnan County, Zhejiang
