= Longgang, Zhejiang =

City in Zhejiang, China

Longgang 龙港市
- County-level city
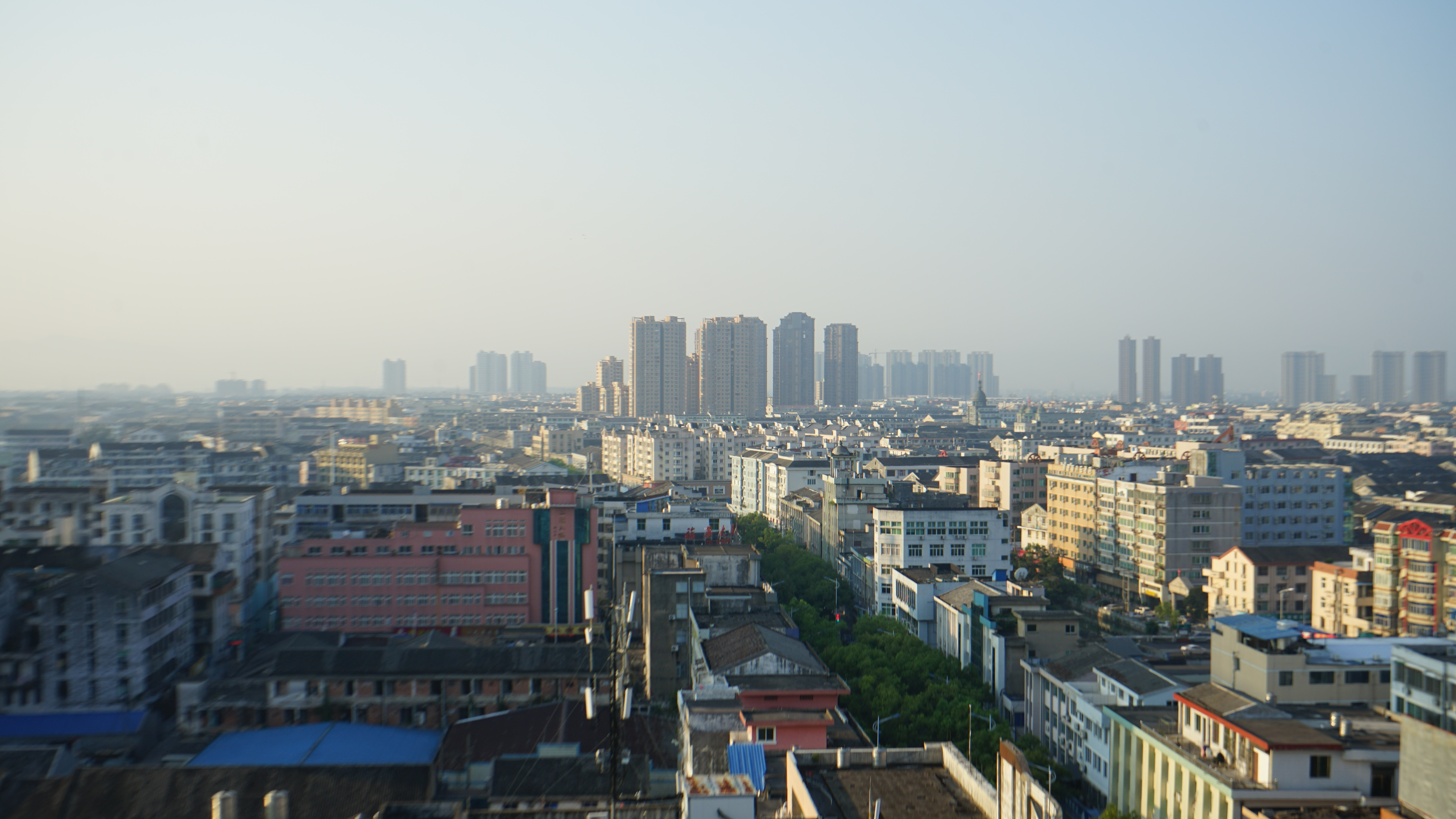
- Longxiang Road

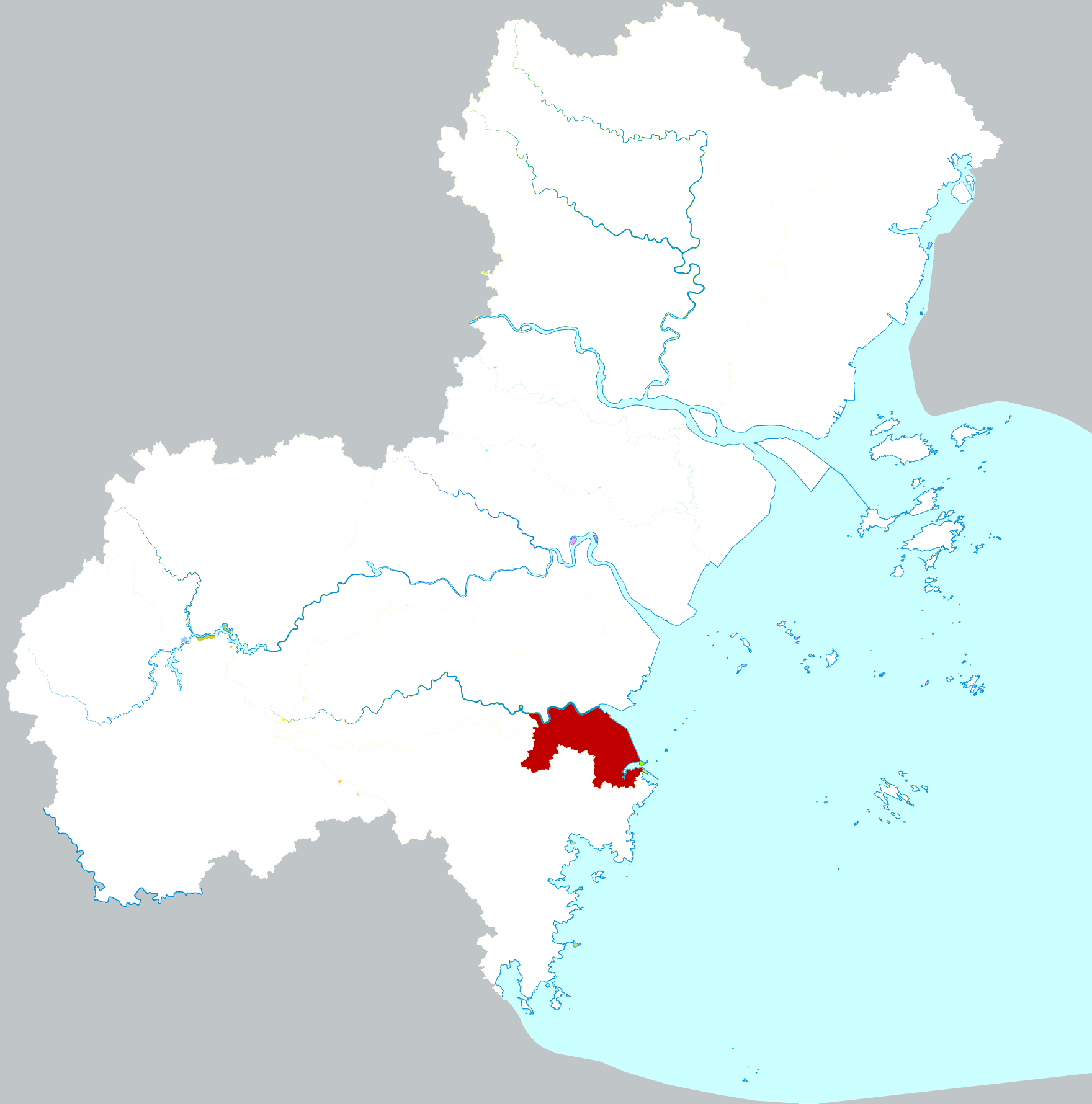
- Location of Longgang City within Wenzhou

- Location in Zhejiang
- Coordinates: 27°34′55″N 120°32′56″E
- Country: People's Republic of China
- Province: Zhejiang
- Prefecture-level city: Wenzhou
- Incorporated town: October 19, 1983 (approved)
- Incorporated city: August 27, 2019 (approved)

Area
  - Total: 183.99 km^{2} (71.04 sq mi)

Population (2018)
  - Total: 382,000
  - Density: 2,080/km^{2} (5,380/sq mi)
- Time zone: UTC+8 (China Standard)

Longgang is a county-level city of Zhejiang, China. As of 2018, its population was 378,000, spread across 183.99 km^{2} (71.04 sq mi) divided into 14 neighborhoods, 22 residential areas, and 171 villages. Longgang is administered as a part of the prefecture-level city of Wenzhou, whose downtown is about 70 kilometers (43 mi) away. Longgang is "the first farmer's city".

== Geography ==
Longgang lies on the south side of the estuary of the Ao River, opposite the town of Aojiang in Pingyang County.

== Name ==
The winding Ao River is also called the Qinglong River (t 青龍江, s 青龙江, Qīnglóng jiāng) by locals on the south bank of the river, after the Azure Dragon of Chinese mythology. This gave its name to the village of Longjiang (t 龍江村, s 龙江村, Lóngjiāng cūn, "Dragon River"). In 1982, Longjiang was joined with nearby Yanjiang (沿江村, Yánjiāng cūn, "Village upon the River") under the name Yanjiang Port Area (t 沿江港區, s 沿江港区, Yánjiāng gǎngqū), but because this could be misunderstood as "a port area upon the river" instead of as a proper name it was soon renamed the Longjiang Port Area (t 龍江港區, s 龙江港区, Lóngjiāng gǎngqū). When the port was elevated to town status the next year, Chen Junqiu—its chief official—renamed it Longgang (t 龍港鎮, s 龙港镇, Lóngjiāng zhèn) as a blend of "Longjiang" and "Port Area".

== History ==
The villages of Longjiang and Yanjiang were selected as the location of a new seaport after the establishment of Cangnan County in 1981, during China's Opening Up Period. When this was publicly announced in February 1982, the people of the county seat at Lingxi began protesting against the decision out of fear that Cangnan's county government would be relocated to the new port. They even beat some of the Communist Party officials from Wenzhou responsible for the decision. The new port area was promoted to town status in 1983, incorporating another three nearby villages, but Lingxi was left as the county seat.

In 1984, the No. 1 Document of China's State Council provided that "farmers who can live self-sufficiently can be given the hukou of city and town dwellers". Longgang quickly opened its hukou to any farmers who bought land to construct new houses or who owned businesses in the town. Within a month, more than 3000 farmers registered for the town's hukou. Its population continued to boom as more people came in from the countryside, reaching 40,000 by 1989, and it became a center of the Chinese printing industry. The town began appealing for city status in 1987 and started urbanizing reforms in 1996. By 2016, the China Business Network described it as "probably the largest town in China". After final approval by the Ministry of Civil Affairs, Zhejiang's provincial government finally elevated it to county-level city status in August 2019.

=== Reform and Opening Up Period ===
Urban growth and industrial change in Longgang became more visible during the reform and opening up period. In the early 1980s, the area was still described as a small fishing village surrounded by mudflats. Local authorities began experimenting with paid land-use arrangements and new household registration policies, which attracted specialized households and entrepreneurs to develop the emerging printing industry. In 1983, the county introduced further innovations in land use and census registration for rural residents. By 1987, more than 6,300 houses built by incoming farmers had been registered, expanding the city's built-up area by over one million square meters and contributing to Longgang's reputation as "the first city built by farmers."

=== Industrial Formation and Modernization ===
In the following decades, Longgang's printing sector gained wider recognition. The city was designated "China's Printing City" in 2002, and local firms later provided printed materials for the 2008 Beijing Olympic Games. After Longgang was upgraded to county-level city status in 2019, its printing and cultural industries began shifting toward intelligent production, customized services, and higher-value cultural and creative products. During the same period, the city government focused on improving administrative methods and strengthening public services as part of its new development stage.

== Economics ==
Longgang's economy built on its origins as a locally financed farmer-built township, with household workshops and bottom-up entrepreneurship laying the foundation for a private-sector-oriented industrial structure. By 2018, the city's gross domestic product had reached CNY 27.71 billion, marking an increase of over 5,500 times from its earlier township level and ranking 17th among China's top 100 towns. Since its establishment as a county-level city in 2019, Longgang has pursued an industrial-upgrading strategy. In 2024, the city's gross domestic product reached CNY 44.373 billion, growing 6.5% year-on-year. GDP per capita is CNY 93,515. The economic structure was 2.4:33.7:64.0 across the primary, secondary, and tertiary sectors. Market-entity cultivation expanded significantly. In 2024, Longgang strengthened support for small businesses, reducing burdens by CNY 0.8 billion, and added more than 22,000 new market entities, bringing the total to 120,500, representing an 11.7% increase from the previous year. Longgang also fostered new growth drivers by upgrading traditional industries and advancing high-tech, emerging, and digital manufacturing sectors.

The printing and packaging industry is a signature of Longgang. Over the past four decades, the sector has evolved into one of China's three major printing and packaging industrial clusters. The sector now comprises over 880 licensed enterprises. Additionally, it supports over 43,000 related enterprises and employs more than 100,000 workers. This sector has not only provided many employment and incomes but also formed a complete industrial chain with an annual output value approaching CNY 50 billion. Longgang hosts three enterprises ranked among China's Top 100 Printing and Packaging Companies, six recognized as China's Top 10 Innovative Printing Enterprises, five honored as China's Best Employers in the Printing Industry, and eleven certified as Green Printing Enterprises. Additionally, it boasts 20 provincial-level specialized enterprises, 177 high-tech enterprises, as well as 76 municipal-level and 19 provincial-level R&D centers. In 2023, Longgang City's printing and packaging industry cluster was designated as a provincial-level "Specialized SME Cluster". It brings together numerous small and medium-sized enterprises, encompassing a complete industrial chain from materials and equipment to printing, packaging, and design.

In agriculture, the total output value of agriculture, forestry, animal husbandry, and fishery reached CNY 1.614 billion in 2024, marking a 3.6% increase. Grain production amounted to 22,644 tons; vegetables and edible fungi output reached 69,203 tons; fruit production totaled 9,204 tons. The total output of meat production including pork, beef, mutton, and poultry reached 2,013 tons with a 56.2% rise over the previous year. As a coastal city, Longgang also reported aquaculture output of over 71,000 tons. Among these, marine products accounted for over 70,000 tons. While advancing agricultural production, Longgang implemented rural revitalization policies to enhance village landscapes and raise income levels for low-income households.

The private sector has consistently been a key driver of Longgang's development. Longgang was initially built with collective funding from farmers, establishing a private economic model centered on family workshops and township enterprises. After being elevated to county-level city status in 2019, Longgang continued to prioritize modernization and industrial upgrading. The 2024 Statistical Bulletin shows that growth rates in high-tech industries, strategic emerging industries, equipment manufacturing, and digital economy manufacturing all surpassed the city's overall industrial output, and the growth rate of R&D investment exceeded the growth rate of revenue.

Openness has also played an important role. The city promotes external connectivity through its "one port, one line, one center" framework. In 2024, Longgang utilized USD 76.31 million in foreign direct investment, an increase of 42.3% from the previous year. Products from printing and related sectors were exported, with enterprises securing foreign trade orders through participation in industry-specific exhibitions. The tertiary sector accounted for 64.0% of GDP in 2024, surpassing the secondary sector. Retail sales of consumer goods reached CNY 179.76 billion, marking a 7.4% year-on-year increase. Tourism projects also progressed. The "Printing Town" scenic area was designated a national 3A-level tourist attraction, and the Coastal Fishing Port Resort officially commenced operations.
