= Jinxiang =

Jinxiang may refer to:

- Jinxiang County (金乡县), Shandong
  - Jinxiang, Shandong (金乡镇), town in and seat of said county
- Jinxiang, Guangdong (金厢镇), town in Lufeng
- Jinxiang, Zhejiang (金乡镇), town in Cangnan County
  - Jinxiang dialect (金乡话), dialect spoken in Jinxiang, Zhejiang
