= Jing County =

Jing County or Jingxian may refer to:

- Jing County, Anhui (泾县), China
- Jing County, Hebei (景县), China
- Jingzhou Miao and Dong Autonomous County, formerly Jing County (靖县)
- Jīngxiān, a class of Xian or immortals in Taoist lore.

== See also ==
- Jin County (disambiguation)
- Jinxian County
- Jinxiang (disambiguation)
