= Ao River (Zhejiang) =

River in Zhejiang, China

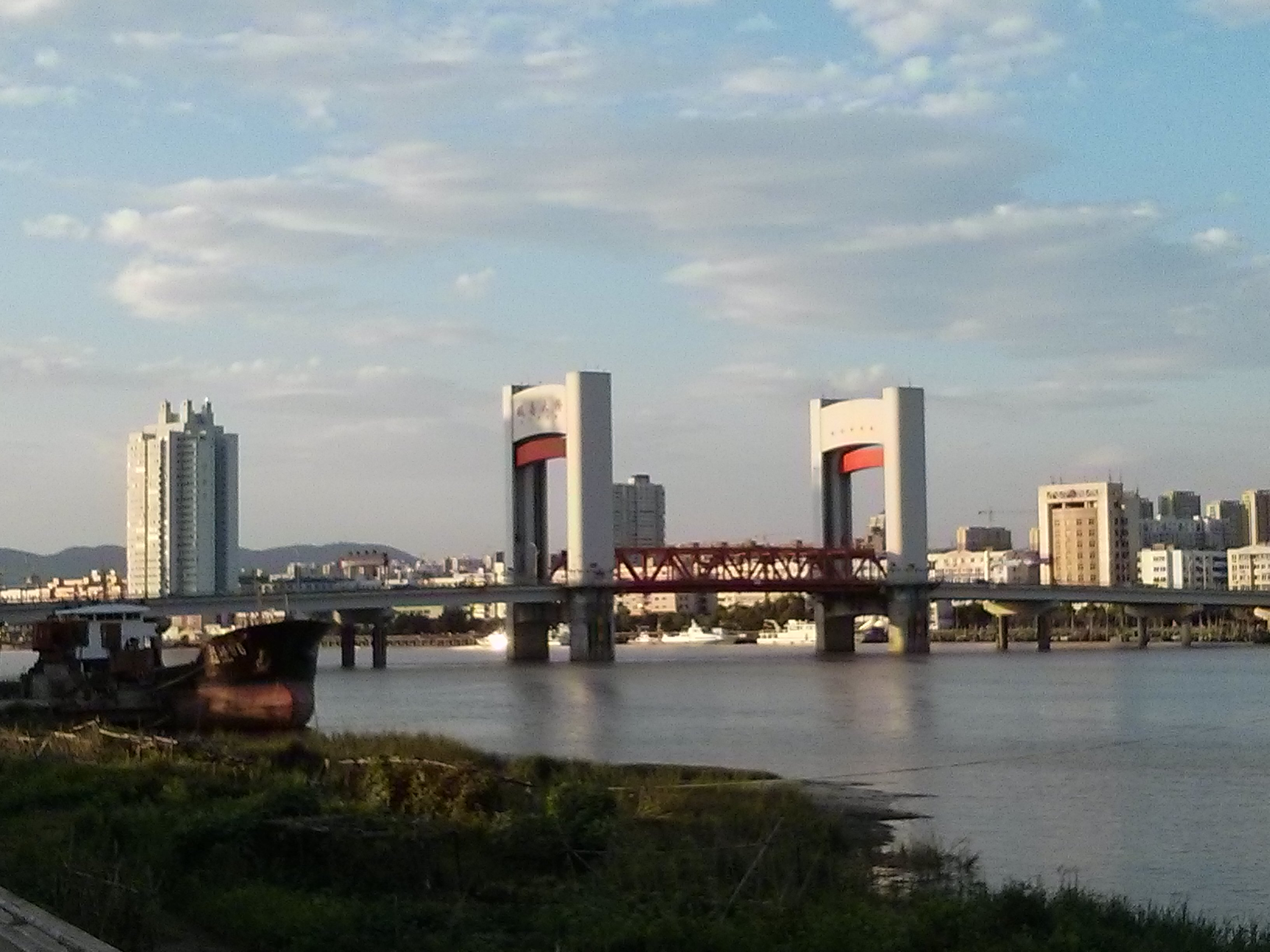
- Ounan Bridge over the Ao
- Maps of the Ao River basin

Location
- Country: China

Physical characteristics
- Source
  - location: The southern slope of Wudi Mountain, Guiku Village, Guishan Township, Wencheng County, Zhejiang, China
  - coordinates: 27°35′39″N 120°03′24″E
- Mouth
  - location: Between Yangyu Mountain n Pingyang and Pipa Mountain in Longgang
  - coordinates: 27°34′7″N 120°37′47″E
- Length: 90 kilometres (56 mi)
- Basin size: 1,521.49 square kilometres (587.45 mi^{2})

The Ao River (Chinese: 鳌江), also known as the Aojiang River, is a river in Wenzhou, Zhejiang, China. One of the eight major river systems in Zhejiang, the Ao is traditionally divided into three sections: the upper reaches known as Shunxi, the middle reaches called Beigang, and the lower reaches referred to as Aojiang. The largest tributary is Nangang, also known as the Hengyang Branch River. The main stream extends for 90 kilometres (56 mi).

The Ao River basin covers Wencheng County, Taishun County, Pingyang County, Cangnan County, and Longgang City in Wenzhou, with a total drainage area of 1,521.49 square kilometres (587.45 sq mi). The Ao River is one of the few rivers in China, apart from the Qiantang River and the Min River, that exhibits a tidal bore phenomenon, and it has long been associated with the traditional practice of tide watching.

== Names ==
The Ao River was historically known as the Shiyang River, a name derived from Shiyang County, which was established in 283 CE. When Shiyang County was later renamed Hengyang County, the river accordingly became known as the Hengyang River. By the Song dynasty, the river had become known as the Qiancang River, due to the town of Qiancang on the river, while the section downstream of Xindu was called the Ao River. In modern usage, "Ao River" has become the standard name for the entire river.

The name "Ao" is associated with the tidal bore at its estuary. In local tradition, the surging tide was likened to a giant mythical turtle bearing a mountain on its back, hence the name Ao River. The town of Aojiang on the northern bank of the estuary also takes its name from this feature. The people from Jiangnan Plain on the southern bank traditionally referred to the river as the Qinglong River, and the name of Longgang City derives from this name.

== Geography ==
The Ao River basin covers four counties and one county level city in southwestern Wenzhou, namely Wencheng, Taishun, Pingyang, Cangnan, and Longgang. Its main stream is commonly divided into three sections: Shun Creek (顺溪), Beigang (北港), and the Ao River proper. The river is 90 kilometres (56 mi) long, including an estuarine reach of about 10 kilometres (6.2 mi), and drains a total catchment area of 1,521.49 square kilometres (587.45 sq mi). A chain of small islands lies offshore from the estuary, which facilitates the formation of tidal flats. According to long term statistics from the water resources authorities, the Ao River estuary, shaped by tidal motion and upstream sediment deposition, is currently prograding seaward by about 10–20 metres (33–66 ft) per year. Major tributaries on the left bank include Mei Creek (梅溪), Tengjiao Creek (腾蛟溪), Fengwo Creek (凤卧溪), Huai Creek (怀溪), Yue Creek (岳溪), and Shizhu Creek (石柱溪). On the right bank, the main tributaries are Nangang (南港), Qingjie Creek (青街溪), and Aoxia Creek (坳下溪), with Nangang (南港) being the largest.

=== Upper reaches ===
The headwaters of the Ao Riverlie in the border area where four counties meet: Wencheng, Pingyang, Cangnan, and Taishun. In June 1987, the Ao River Water Conservancy Command (鳌江水利指挥部) organised an upstream field survey and ultimately identified the river's source as Wudi Mountain (吴地山), a branch of the South Yandang Mountains, located at the southern foot of Guiku Village (桂库村), Guishan Township, Wencheng County. The main peak of Wudi Mountain reaches 1,124 metres (3,688 ft) metres above sea level, while the Ao River rises from its southern slope at an elevation of 835 metres (2,740 ft). From its source to Dongmen Village in Nanyan Town, Pingyang, the Ao River's upper course is known as Shunxi (顺溪), or the Shun Creek. This reach is about 30 kilometres (19 mi) long, has an average channel gradient of 2.7%, and drains a catchment area of 215 square kilometres (83 sq mi). Within it, the section from the river source to Shunxi is about 19.1 kilometres (11.9 mi) long and drains 112 square kilometres (43 sq mi). This stretch runs mainly through gorges, with an average gradient of 3.98%, fast flowing water, and a cobble bed. During heavy rain, water levels rise and fall rapidly, making it a typical mountain stream reach. Downstream of Shunxi, the channel bed becomes generally wider and shallower, typically paved with sand and gravel, with embankments built along both banks.

=== Middle reaches ===
Below Dongmen Village (东门村) in Nanyan Town and extending to Mabu Town, the river enters its middle course, known as Beigang (北港). From Dongmen, Beigang enters a gorge, then bends northeastwards, where it encounters a weir at Putanyang (蒲潭垟). Downstream of Putanyang and south of Shuitou Town, the channel has historically been unstable, with three principal courses recorded. In 1853, flooding caused the channel to shift southwards. In 1924, another major flood cut through a meander, straightening the course. In 1974 CE, blockage of the channel led to another southward shift. After 1985, due to local demand for construction materials, sand and gravel were excavated from the former channel near Shuitou, prompting the river to show a tendency to migrate back northwards towards the older course closer to the town. Although this reach is relatively gentle in gradient, it is wide and shallow, and water levels during the dry season are too low to permit navigation. Downstream of Zhanjiabu (詹家埠), the river becomes tidally influenced. During the rainy season, the combined effects of upstream discharge and tidal backwater from downstream make this area particularly prone to flooding.

=== Lower reaches ===
Below Mabu Town, the Ao enters its lower course, which is also referred to as the Ao River proper. Mabu Town was historically an important hub for river transport. Downstream of Mabu, the main channel is lined with numerous river ports, making it favourable for navigation, and vessels of up to 3,000 tonnes have been able to berth along the northern bank. Downstream of Xiakou Sluice (夏口水闸) and north of Xiaojiang Town, the river forms a 360 degree hairpin bend. In this reach, scouring is pronounced, and the riverbed elevation reaches −4 metres (−13 ft). Continuing eastwards past Xiaojiang Town, the river reaches Zhujia Station (朱家站) within Longgang, where it joins its largest tributary, the Nangang (南港), on the right bank. Below Shizikou (狮子口), the river enters its estuarine section. The estuary is irregular and trumpet shaped, widening to about 10 kilometres (6.2 mi) at its mouth, while at Shizikou the channel is about 1 kilometre (0.62 mi) wide, with a riverbed only 500 metres (1,600 ft) across. The rapid narrowing of the channel over a short distance generates a tidal bore. The tidal range at the estuary is about 0.3–0.5 metres (1 ft 0 in – 1 ft 8 in), while the highest tidal levels occur near Qianchang, reaching around 1 metre (3 ft 3 in).

== Navigation ==
The development of the Ao River estuary was first described by Han Yu which records the construction of seawalls along the Ao River. The northern bank of the estuary consists largely of bedrock and sandy shores and is relatively stable, whereas the southern bank has experienced rapid siltation. Based on 30 years of data since the 1950s, water conservancy authorities have estimated an annual progradation rate of 10–20 metres (33–66 ft), resulting in substantial changes to the seawall line. The Port of Aojiang comprises two port areas: Aojiang Town on the northern bank and Longgang City on the southern bank. Initially serving as a centre for fishing and trade, the port began operating steamship transport in 1924. It later became one of the principal ports in Zhejiang Province, handling imports and exports for parts of southern Zhejiang and northern Fujian, and was incorporated into the Port of Wenzhou in 2007.

During the War of Resistance against Japan, Pingyang County magistrate Xu Yongling (徐用令) and garrison commander Zheng Xianliang (郑贤亮) deliberately scuttled ships at Shizikou in the Ao River, constructing an underwater blockade line 439 metres (1,440 ft) long. This led to severe siltation of the navigation channel. A 1961 survey recorded that the water depth at the blockade site was only 1.6 metres (5 ft 3 in). Beginning in the Great Leap Forward period, the Pingyang Port and Navigation Bureau carried out blasting operations to remove the obstruction and maintained a low tide depth of about 4 metres (13 ft). By 1990, a channel approximately 400 metres (1,300 ft) wide had been cleared on the southern side of the Ao River, allowing vessels of up to 2,000 tonnes to enter the port on the tide.

Nevertheless, persistent siltation has continued to hinder navigation. For about 10 kilometres seaward from Shizikou, the Ao River estuary consists of the river mouth bar. According to 2016 data from the Pingyang Port and Navigation Bureau, the low tide depth was only 1 metre (3 ft 3 in), requiring vessels over 1,000 tonnes to rely on tidal windows for entry. In addition, bridge construction upstream has imposed height restrictions on vessels. Both Longgang and Pingyang have moved their new docks away from the Ao River.

== Hydrology ==
According to data from the Zhejiang provincial hydrological authorities, the Ao River basin has an average annual total water resource volume of 1,919,000,000 m^{3} (1.171×10^{14} cu in), of which 1.753 billion cubic metres consist of surface water. Based on data from the 1990s, water supply accounted for only about 9% of the total basin water volume, indicating that water resources remain relatively underdeveloped. With the exception of areas such as Longgang and Aojiang, where industrial development has led to significant water quality deterioration, the main stream and tributaries generally maintain relatively good water quality. The basin receives abundant rainfall, and as most of the area consists of mountainous and hilly terrain, it possesses considerable theoretical hydropower potential. Although the theoretical capacity is estimated at 139,000 kilowatts, only 62,700 kilowatts are considered exploitable. Hydropower resources are mainly distributed among tributaries, and because the gradient of the main stream is relatively uniform, neither the main stream nor its tributaries are suitable for the construction of large scale hydropower stations.
