= Manjiang dialect =

Eastern Min dialect of China

Manjiang
- 蠻講, 蠻話
- Native to: China
- Region: southeastern Zhejiang
- Native speakers: 500,000 (2012)
- Language family: Sino-Tibetan: Sinitic; Chinese; Min; Coastal Min; Eastern Min; Manjiang
- Early forms: Proto-Sino-Tibetan: Old Chinese (Note: Min is believed to have split from Old Chinese, rather than Middle Chinese like other varieties of Chinese.); Proto-Min

Language codes
- ISO 639-3: –
- Glottolog: None
- Linguasphere: 79-AAA-ia

Manjiang (simplified Chinese: 蛮讲; traditional Chinese: 蠻講; pinyin: Mánjiǎng), also known as Manhua (simplified Chinese: 蛮话; traditional Chinese: 蠻話; pinyin: Mánhuà; lit. 'Man speech'), is an Eastern Min dialect spoken mainly in Taishun and Cangnan Counties in Wenzhou, as well as parts of Qingyuan County in Lishui, in southeastern Zhejiang province.

As a dialect of Eastern Min, Manjiang is very distant from major Chinese varieties such as Mandarin and Cantonese, and displays very significant elements of a substratal indigenous language, perhaps belonging to the Austroasiatic or Tai–Kadai language families.

== Sources ==
- Cao, Zhiyun (2012). "B2-10 Zhèjiāng Shěng de Hànyǔ fāngyán" B2—10 浙江省的汉语方言 [B2-10: Chinese Dialects in Zhejiang Province]. Zhōngguó yǔyán dìtú jí 中国语言地图集 [Language Atlas of China] (in Chinese). Vol. 汉语方言卷 (2nd ed.). Beijing: Commercial Press. pp. 204–208. ISBN 978-7-100-07054-6.
