= Zhenan Min =

Variety of Southern Min

- 浙南闽语
- Native to: China
- Region: Zhejiang
- Native speakers: (undated figure of 570,000)
- Language family: Sino-Tibetan: Sinitic; Chinese; Min; Coastal Min; Southern Min; Zhenan Min
- Early forms: Proto-Sino-Tibetan: Old Chinese (Note: Min is believed to have split from Old Chinese, rather than Middle Chinese like other varieties of Chinese.); Proto-Min
- Writing system: Chinese characters

Language codes
- ISO 639-3: None (mis)
- Glottolog: zhen1239
- Linguasphere: (transition to 79-AAA-h and -i) 79-AAA-jb (transition to 79-AAA-h and -i)
- Zhenan Min

Zhenan Min (simplified Chinese: 浙南闽语; traditional Chinese: 浙南閩語; pinyin: Zhènán Mǐnyǔ; Pe̍h-ōe-jī: Chiat-lâm-bân-gí; lit. 'Min language in southern Zhejiang'), is a variety of Southern Min spoken in the vicinity of Wenzhou, in the southeast of Zhejiang province, China.

The Zhenan Min people had settled in areas such as Cangnan County, Pingyang County, Yuhuan County and Dongtou County from Fujian Province as early as the Tang dynasty period (618–907) and new waves of immigrants continued during the Southern Song dynasty, Ming dynasty and the Qing dynasty periods.

Zhenan Min has in the past been influenced by Eastern Min and Northern Min, due to its close geographical proximity with those areas. It has limited intelligibility with other Southern Min varieties, such as Teochew and Hokkien–Taiwanese. Zhenan Min, in proximity to the Wenzhou dialect and Jinxiang dialect, has also borrowed some influences from Wu Chinese, such as voiced initials (z) and noun suffixes unique to Wu Chinese (such as 头).

== See also ==
- Varieties of Chinese
