= Fu'an dialect =

Dialect of Eastern Min

Fu'an
- Native to: Southern China
- Region: Ningde, Fu'an, Shouning, Zhouning and Zherong, Fujian province
- Language family: Sino-Tibetan: Sinitic; Chinese; Min; Coastal Min; Eastern Min; Funing; Fu'an
- Early forms: Proto-Sino-Tibetan: Old Chinese (Note: Min is believed to have split from Old Chinese, rather than Middle Chinese like other varieties of Chinese.); Proto-Min
- Writing system: Chinese characters

Language codes
- ISO 639-3: –
- ISO 639-6: fuua
- Glottolog: None
- Linguasphere: 79-AAA-ibc

The Fu'an dialect (福安話) is a dialect of Eastern Min, which is a branch of Min Chinese spoken mainly in the eastern part of Fujian Province, China.

The Fu'an dialect covers two city and three counties: Ningde, Fu'an, Shouning, Zhouning and Zherong County.

== Phonology ==
The Fu'an dialect has 18 initials, 50 rimes and 7 tones.

=== Initials ===
	Labial		Dental	Alveolar		Postalveolar	Palatal	Velar		Glottal
Stop	p	pʰ		t	tʰ			k	kʰ	ʔ
Nasal	m			n				ŋ		
Fricative	(β)	(f)	θ			(ʒ)	(ç)		x	
Affricate				ts	tsʰ					
Lateral				l						
Approximant							j	ɰ		

=== Rimes ===
Open syllable	i	u	e	ɛ	ø	œ	o	ɔ	a
Open syllable		ui	ei					ɔi	ai
Open syllable									uai
Open syllable	iu		eu	ɛu			ou		au
Open syllable									iau
Nasal coda	iŋ (in, im)	uŋ (un, um)			øŋ (øn, øm)	œŋ (œn, œm)			aŋ (an, am)
Nasal coda							ioŋ (ion, iom)		iaŋ (ian, iam)
Nasal coda									uaŋ (uan, uam)
Nasal coda				ɛŋ (ɛn, ɛm)			ouŋ (oun, oum)	ɔuŋ (ɔun, ɔum)	
Glottal coda	iʔ	uʔ			øʔ	œʔ	oʔ	ɔʔ	aʔ
Glottal coda							ioʔ		iaʔ
Glottal coda									uaʔ
Glottal coda			eiʔ	ɛiʔ			ouʔ	ɔuʔ	
Nasal	m̝	n̝	ŋ̍	hŋ̍					

=== Tones ===
No.	1	2	3	4	5	6	7
Tone name	dark level 陰平	light level 陽平	rising 上聲	dark departing 陰去	light departing 陽去	dark entering 陰入	light entering 陽入
Tone contour	˧˧˨ 332	˨ 22	˦˨ 42	˧˥ 35	˨˧ 23	˥ 5	˨ 2

=== Progressive assimilation ===
The Coda of the Former Syllable	The initial assimilation of the Latter Syllable
Null coda	/k/, /kʰ/ and /h/ change to null initial; /ts/, /tsʰ/ and /s/ change to null initial, /l/ or /ʒ/.
coda /-ŋ/	/t/, /tʰ/ change to /n/; /p/, /pʰ/ change to /m/; /k/, /kʰ/ and /h/ change to /ŋ/; /ts/, /tsʰ/ and /s/ change to /ŋ/, /n/ or /ʒ/.
coda /-k̚/	/t/, /tʰ/ change to /l/; /k/, /kʰ/ and /h/ change to null initial; /ts/, /tsʰ/ and /s/ change to null initial, /l/ or /ʒ/.

=== Tone sandhi ===
The two-syllable tonal sandhi rules are shown in the table below (the rows give the first syllable's original citation tone, while the columns give the citation tone of the second syllable). Shaded cells indicate that tones of both the first and second syllables undergo change.

	dark level 332	light level 22	rising 42	dark departing 35	light departing 23	dark entering 5	light entering 2
dark level 332			55	55	44		44
light level 22	332		35+42	55	44		44
rising 42	23+332		35+42	55	44		44
dark departing 35			55	55	44		44
light departing 23			55	55	44		44
dark entering 5			55	55	44		44
light entering 2			35+5	55	44		44
