= Jin County =

Jin County or Jinxian may refer to:

- Jinzhou, Hebei, formerly Jin County (晋县)
- Jinzhou District, Dalian, Liaoning, formerly Jin County (金县)
- Linghai, Liaoning, formerly Jin County (锦县)

== See also ==
- Jing County (disambiguation)
- Jinxian County
