= Jinxiang dialect =

Taihu Wu dialect of Wenzhou, China

- 金鄉話
- Native to: China
- Region: Jinxiang, Cangnan county, Wenzhou prefecture-level city, Zhejiang province
- Native speakers: (undated figure of 15,000 speakers)
- Language family: Sino-Tibetan: Sinitic; Chinese; Wu; Taihu; Jinxiang dialect

Language codes
- ISO 639-3: –
- Glottolog: None

The Jinxiang dialect (Chinese: 金鄉話; pinyin: Jīnxiānghuà) is a Taihu Wu dialect, or a Northern Wu dialect, spoken in the county of Cangnan of the prefecture-level city Wenzhou. It is considered to be a Taihu Wu linguistic exclave within the mostly Min Nan-speaking part of Southern Zhejiang.

The Modern Jinxiang dialect is descended from the speech of soldiers from Northern Zhejiang who settled during the Ming dynasty due to Wokou pirate raids, during the reign of the Jiajing Emperor. These soldiers were sent to Jinxiang to protect the town from raids by the Wokou. The majority of Jinxiang natives today are descended from those soldiers who served under Qi Jiguang.

Isolated from the other Taihu Wu-speaking regions, surrounded by Min Nan-speaking areas, the Jinxiang dialect has some degree of influence from Zhenan Min. It has also some influence from Mandarin Chinese.
