= Eastern Min =

Branch of the Min group of Sinitic languages of China

- Min Dong (閩東語); Foochowese (福州話)
- 平話 Bàng-uâ
- Region: Southeast China, Japan, United States, Taiwan
- Native speakers: 11 million (2022)
- Language family: Sino-Tibetan: Sinitic; Chinese; Min; Coastal Min; Eastern Min
- Early forms: Proto-Sino-Tibetan: Old Chinese (Note: Min is believed to have split from Old Chinese, rather than Middle Chinese like other varieties of Chinese.); Proto-Min
- Varieties: Funing: Fu'an, Ningde; Houguan: Fuqing, Fuzhou, Matsu; Manjiang; Zhongshan
- Writing system: Chinese characters and Foochow Romanized

Official status
- Official language in: Matsu Islands, Taiwan
- Recognised minority language in: statutory language for public transport in the Matsu Islands

Language codes
- ISO 639-3: cdo
- Glottolog: mind1253
- Eastern Min

Eastern Min or Min Dong (traditional Chinese: 閩東語; simplified Chinese: 闽东语; pinyin: Mǐndōngyǔ, Foochow Romanized: Mìng-dĕ̤ng-ngṳ̄) is a branch of the Min group of the Chinese languages of China. The prestige form and most commonly cited representative form is the Fuzhou dialect, the speech of the capital of Fujian.

== Geographic distribution ==
=== Fujian and vicinity ===
Eastern Min varieties are mainly spoken in the eastern region of Fujian, in and near the cities of Fuzhou and Ningde. This includes the traditional Ten Counties of Fuzhou (Chinese: 福州十邑; pinyin: Fúzhōu Shí Yì; Foochow Romanized: Hók-ciŭ Sĕk Ék), a region that consists of present-day Pingnan, Gutian, Luoyuan, Minqing, Lianjiang, Changle, Minhou, Yongtai, Fuqing and Pingtan, as well as the urban area of Fuzhou proper.

It is also widely encountered as the first language of the Matsu Islands controlled by Taiwan. Historically, the Eastern Min varieties in the Matsu Islands were seen as a part of the Lianjiang variety. The establishment of the People's Republic of China in 1949 separated the Matsu Islands from the rest of Fujian, and as communications were cut off between the ROC and the PRC, the specific identity of the Matsu Islands was established. Thus, the varieties of Eastern Min on the Matsu Islands became seen as the Matsu dialect.

Additionally, the inhabitants of Taishun and Cangnan to the north of Fujian in Zhejiang also speak Eastern Min varieties. To the south of Fujian, in Zhongshan County, Guangdong, varieties classified as Eastern Min are also spoken in the towns of Dachong, Shaxi and Nanlang.

Eastern Min generally coexists with Standard Chinese, in all these areas. On the ROC, the Matsu dialect is officially recognized as a statutory language for transport announcements on the Matsu Islands. In Fuzhou, there is radio available in the local dialect, and the Fuzhou Metro officially uses alongside Standard Mandarin and English in its announcements.

=== United States ===
As the coastal area of Fujian has been the historical homeland of a large worldwide diaspora of overseas Chinese, varieties of Eastern Min can also be found across the world, especially in their respective Chinatowns. Cities with high concentrations of such immigrants include New York City, especially Little Fuzhou, Manhattan, Sunset Park, Brooklyn and Flushing, Queens.

=== Europe ===
Speakers of Eastern Min varieties are also found in various Chinatown communities in Europe, including London, Paris, and the city of Prato in Italy. In the United Kingdom, a large proportion of the British Chinese community is made up of migrants coming from areas of Fujian that speak Eastern Min, principally from rural parts of Fuqing and Changle. In Spain, speakers of Eastern Min from Fuqing and Changle are also common, second to the more dominant Zhejiang community, who speak varieties of Southern Wu such as Wenzhounese.

=== Japan and Malaysia ===
Chinese communities within Ikebukuro, Tokyo as well as Sibu, Sarawak, Malaysia have significant populations of Eastern Min speakers. Fuzhou communities can also be found in Sitiawan, Perak and Yong Peng, Johor in West Malaysia and in Rajang river towns of Kanowit, Sarikei, Kapit and Bintangor in East Malaysia.

== Classification ==
Eastern Min is descended from Proto-Min, which split from the transition from Old Chinese into Middle Chinese during the Han dynasty. It has been classified by Pan Maoding and Jerry Norman as belonging to the Coastal Min branch, and is thus closely related to Northern Min.

Norman lists four distinctive features in the development of Eastern Min:

- The Proto-Min initial *dz- becomes s- in Eastern Min, as opposed to ts- as in Southern Min. For example, 坐 'to sit' is pronounced sô̤i (IPA: /sɔy²⁴²/) in colloquial Fuzhou dialect, but tsō (IPA: /t͡so²²/) in the Amoy dialect and Taiwanese Hokkien.
- Eastern Min varieties have an upper register tone for words which correspond to voiceless nasal initials in Proto-Min, e.g. 妹 'younger sister' in Fuzhou is pronounced with an upper departing tone muói (IPA: /mui²¹³/) rather than a lower departing tone.
- Some lexemes descend from Old Chinese which have been conserved in Eastern Min but replaced in other Min varieties. For example, 犬 instead of 狗 for 'dog'.
- A lack of nasal vowels, in contrast to Southern Min.

=== Branches ===
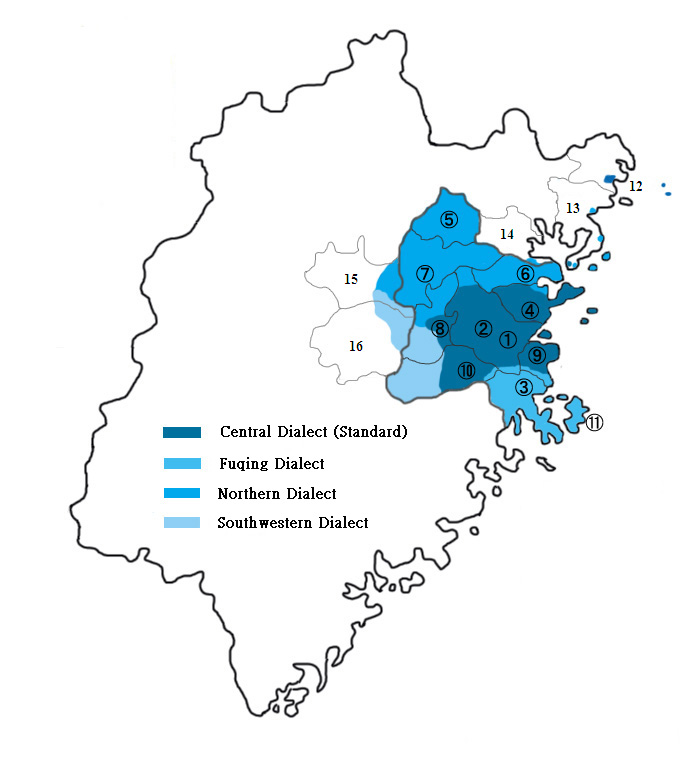
The branches of Eastern Min

Eastern Min is conventionally divided into three branches:

1. Houguan language group (侯官片), also called the Southern subgroup, includes the varieties of Fuzhou, Fuqing, Changle, Lianjiang and that of the Matsu Islands.
2. Fu-Ning language group (福寧片), also called the Northern subgroup, includes the varieties of Ningde and Fu'an.
3. Manjiang (蠻講), spoken in parts of Taishun and Cangnan, Wenzhou, Zhejiang.

Besides these three branches, some dialect islands in the province of Guangdong have been classified as Eastern Min. Zhongshan Min is a group of Min varieties spoken in the Zhongshan county of Guangdong, divided into three branches: the Longdu dialect and Nanlang dialect belong to the Eastern Min group, while the Sanxiang dialect belongs to Southern Min.

== Phonology ==
The Eastern Min group has a phonology that is particularly divergent from other varieties of Chinese. Aside from the Manjiang dialect, both Houguan and Funing groups are similar in the number of initials, with the Fu'an dialect having 17 initials, two more than the Fuzhou dialect, the additions being /w/ and /j/ or /ɰ/ as separate phonemes (the glottal stop is common to both but excluded from this count). The Manjiang dialect on the other hand has been influenced by the Wu dialects of Zhejiang, and hence has significantly more initials than the varieties of Fujian.

The finals vary significantly between varieties, with the extremes being represented by Manjiang dialects at a low of 39 separate finals, and the Ningde dialect representing the high at 69 finals.

Comparison of numbers of Eastern Min initials and finals
Types	Houguan subgroup (侯官片)			Funing subgroup (福寧片)			Manjiang (蠻講)
City	Fuzhou (福州)	Fuqing (福清)	Gutian (古田)	Ningde (宁德)	Fuding (福鼎)	Fu'an (福安)	Qianku, Cangnan, Zhejiang (蒼南錢庫)
Number of Initials	15	15	15	15	15	17	29
Number of Finals	46	42	51	69	41	56	39
Number of Tones	7	7	7	7	7	7	7

Eastern Min varieties generally have seven tones, by the traditional count (based on the four tones of Middle Chinese, including the entering tone as a separate entity). In the middle of the Qing dynasty, eight tones were attested, but the historical rising tones (上聲) re-merged.

Comparison of tones across Eastern Min varieties
	Level 平		Rising 上聲	Departing 去		Entering 入	
	Dark 陰	Light 陽	Rising 上聲	Dark 陰	Light 陽	Dark 陰	Light 陽
Fuzhou 福州話	˦ 44	˥˧ 53	˧˩ 31	˨˩˧ 213	˨˦˨ 242	˨˧ 23	˥ 5
Fu'an 福安話	˧˧˨ 332	˨ 22	˦˨ 42	˨˩ 21	˧˨˦ 324	˨ 2	˥ 5
Ningde 寧德話	˦ 44	˩ 11	˦˨ 42	˧˥ 35	˥˨ 52	˦ 4	˥ 5
Fuding 福鼎話	˦˦˥ 445	˨˩˨ 212	˥ 55	˥˧ 53	˨ 22	˥ 5	˨˧ 23
Taishun, Zhejiang 泰順	˨˩˧ 213	˧ 33	˦˥˥ 455	˥˧ 53	˦˨ 42	˥ 5	˦˧ 43
Qianku, Cangnan, Zhejiang 蒼南錢庫蠻講	˦ 44	˨˩˦ 214	˦˥ 45	˦˩ 41	˨˩ 21	˥ 5	˨˩ 21
Miaojiaqiao, Cangnan, Zhejiang 蒼南繆家橋蠻講	˧ 33	˨˩˧ 213	˦˥ 45	˦˩ 41	˩ 11	˥ 5	˩ 1

=== Sandhi phenomena ===
The Eastern Min varieties have a wide range of sandhi phenomena. As well as tone sandhi, common to many varieties of Chinese, there is also the assimilation of consonants and vowel alternations (such as rime tensing).

Tone sandhi across Eastern Min varieties can be regressive (where the last syllable affects the pronunciation of those before), progressive (where earlier syllables affect the later ones) or mutual (where both or all syllables change). The rules are generally quite complicated.

Initial assimilation of consonants is usually progressive and may create new phonemes that are not phonemically contrastive in initial position but do contrast in medial position. For example, in the Fuzhou dialect, the /β/ phoneme can arise from /pʰ/ or /p/ in an intervocalic environment.

Many varieties also exhibit regressive assimilation of consonants, such as in the way a final nasal consonant, usually given the citation value /ŋ/, assimilates to the place of articulation of the following consonant. For example, the negative adverb of the Fuzhou dialect, often written 伓, is generally transcribed in Bàng-uâ-cê as n̂g /ŋ/, but it can also surface as /m/ before labial consonants and as /n/ before dental consonants. In this case, since both regressive and progressive assimilation processes occur, it can be described as mutual assimilation, resulting in one nasal consonant.

== See also ==
- Protection of the varieties of Chinese
