= Lingxi, Zhejiang =

Lingxi 灵溪
- Town
- Location in Zhejiang
- Coordinates: 27°30′13″N 120°23′51″E
- Country: China
- Province: Zhejiang
- Prefecture: Wenzhou
- County: Cangnan

Population (2020)
  - Total: 384,390

Lingxi Town is a town in Cangnan County, Wenzhou City, Zhejiang Province, China, and the seat of Cangnan County. The main spoken Chinese dialect is Southern Min. The Wenzhou dialect is also spoken, but less widely. Its population is 384,390, and it has an area of 170.9 square kilometers.

== Etymology ==
Lingxi's Southern Min name ling kuei means "dragon creek". It was named after a creek on a dragon shaped mountain in eastern Lingxi.

== Economy ==
Lingxi's GDP was 16.201 billion RMB in 2018.

Intime Shopping Center

== Transport ==
Cangnan train station is situated in Lingxi, with high-speed trains to Shanghai and Shenzhen.

== Education ==
- Cangnan Middle School
