= Zhouning County =

Zhouning County 周宁县
- County
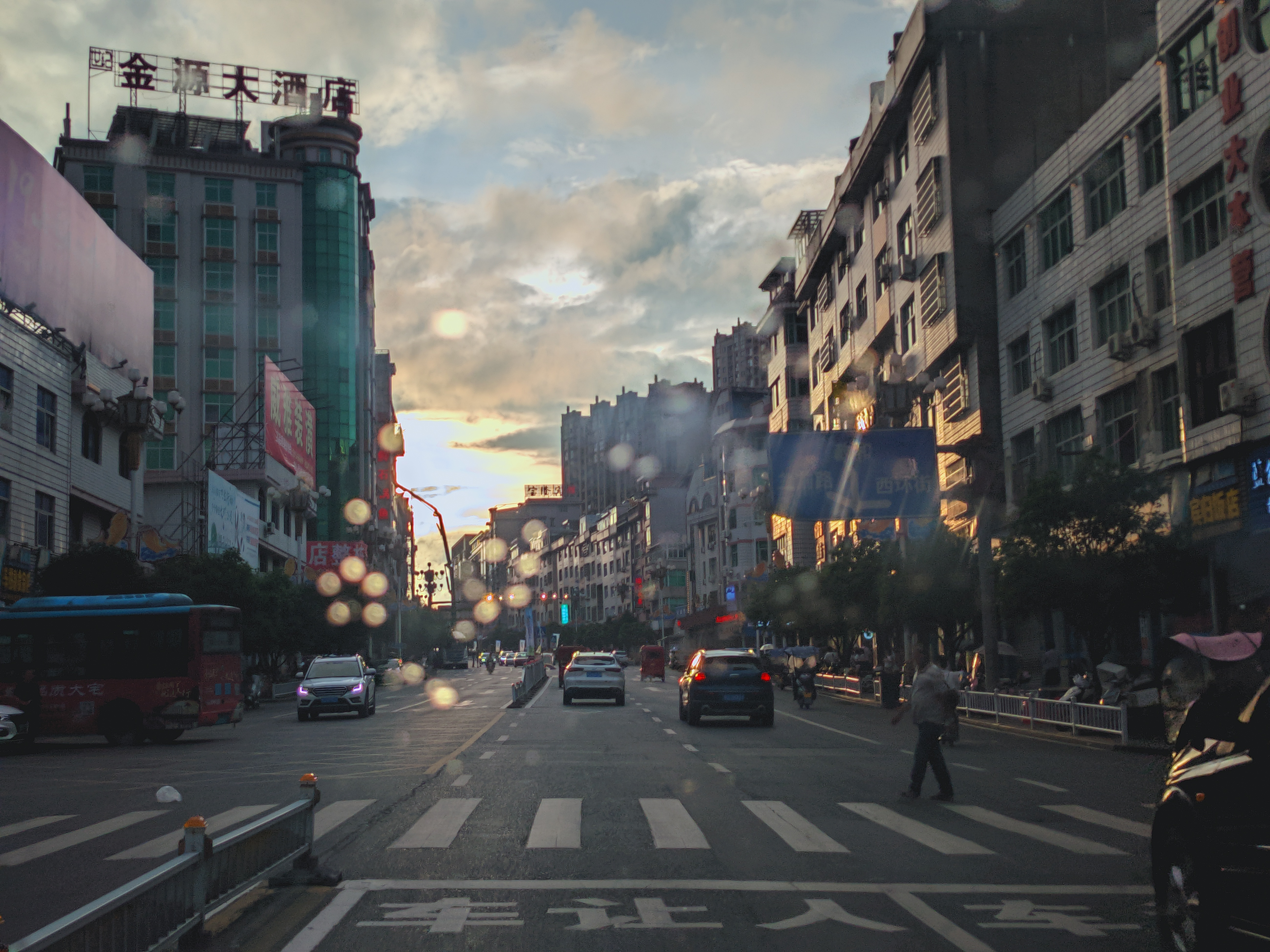

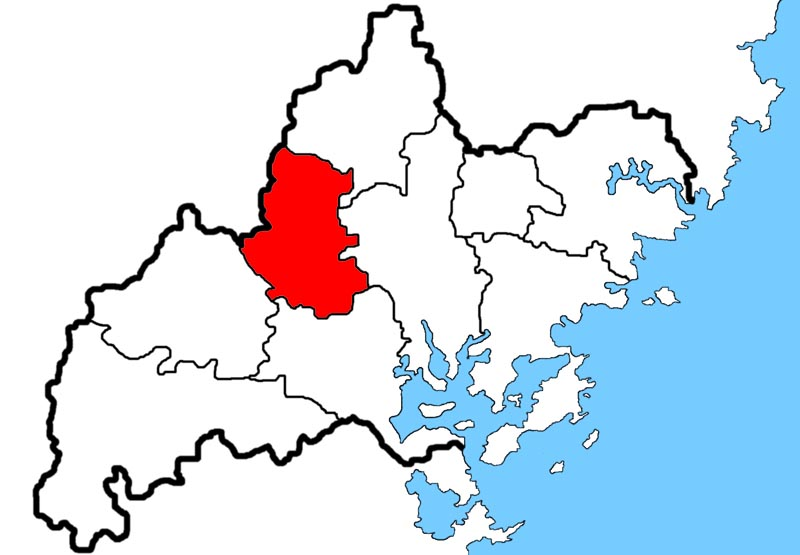
- Zhouning in Ningde

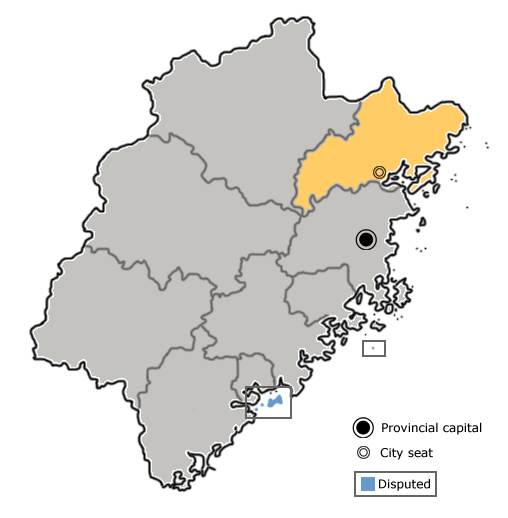
- Ningde in Fujian
- Coordinates: 27°06′17″N 119°20′20″E
- Country: People's Republic of China
- Province: Fujian
- Prefecture-level city: Ningde

Area
  - Total: 1,047 km^{2} (404 sq mi)

Population (2020 census)
  - Total: 149,567
  - Density: 142.9/km^{2} (370.0/sq mi)
- Time zone: UTC+8 (China Standard)

Zhouning County (simplified Chinese: 周宁县; traditional Chinese: 周寧縣; pinyin: Zhōuníng Xiàn; Foochow Romanized: Ciŭ-nìng-gâing) is a county of northeastern Fujian province, People's Republic of China. It is under the administration of the prefecture-level city of Ningde.

== Administrative divisions ==
Towns:

- Shicheng (狮城镇), Xiancun (咸村镇), Puyuan (浦源镇), Qibu (七步镇), Lidun (李墩镇), Chunchi (纯池镇)

Townships:

- Siqiao Township (泗桥乡), Limen Township (礼门乡), Makeng Township (玛坑乡)

== Climate ==
Climate data for Zhouning, elevation 899 m (2,949 ft), (1991–2020 normals, extremes 1981–2010)
Month	Jan	Feb	Mar	Apr	May	Jun	Jul	Aug	Sep	Oct	Nov	Dec	Year
Record high °C (°F)	22.9 (73.2)	27.2 (81.0)	29.3 (84.7)	30.7 (87.3)	32.1 (89.8)	32.5 (90.5)	35.7 (96.3)	33.6 (92.5)	32.7 (90.9)	30.4 (86.7)	29.6 (85.3)	23.6 (74.5)	35.7 (96.3)
Mean daily maximum °C (°F)	10.5 (50.9)	12.0 (53.6)	15.0 (59.0)	19.6 (67.3)	23.1 (73.6)	25.9 (78.6)	28.7 (83.7)	27.9 (82.2)	25.0 (77.0)	21.0 (69.8)	16.8 (62.2)	12.5 (54.5)	19.8 (67.7)
Daily mean °C (°F)	5.9 (42.6)	7.2 (45.0)	10.3 (50.5)	14.9 (58.8)	18.7 (65.7)	22.1 (71.8)	24.4 (75.9)	23.6 (74.5)	20.9 (69.6)	16.5 (61.7)	12.3 (54.1)	7.7 (45.9)	15.4 (59.7)
Mean daily minimum °C (°F)	2.8 (37.0)	4.0 (39.2)	6.7 (44.1)	11.2 (52.2)	15.3 (59.5)	19.2 (66.6)	21.1 (70.0)	20.6 (69.1)	17.9 (64.2)	13.2 (55.8)	9.0 (48.2)	4.3 (39.7)	12.1 (53.8)
Record low °C (°F)	−8.2 (17.2)	−5.2 (22.6)	−5.0 (23.0)	−0.1 (31.8)	4.0 (39.2)	9.2 (48.6)	15.1 (59.2)	15.2 (59.4)	9.9 (49.8)	1.6 (34.9)	−2.7 (27.1)	−8.9 (16.0)	−8.9 (16.0)
Average precipitation mm (inches)	74.0 (2.91)	106.7 (4.20)	179.0 (7.05)	168.1 (6.62)	241.8 (9.52)	326.6 (12.86)	243.8 (9.60)	330.6 (13.02)	185.7 (7.31)	78.2 (3.08)	79.5 (3.13)	67.9 (2.67)	2,081.9 (81.97)
Average precipitation days (≥ 0.1 mm)	16.0	16.3	19.9	18.6	20.0	20.1	16.5	20.7	15.6	10.7	12.7	13.1	200.2
Average snowy days	1.8	1.9	0.3	0	0	0	0	0	0	0	0	0.5	4.5
Average relative humidity (%)	83	84	82	80	81	83	80	83	83	79	81	79	82
Mean monthly sunshine hours	104.6	92.0	102.5	114.6	118.7	112.5	193.5	160.6	138.8	150.4	114.7	123.9	1,526.8
Percentage possible sunshine	32	29	27	30	28	27	46	40	38	43	36	38	35
Source: China Meteorological Administration
