= Jinxiang, Zhejiang =

Jinxiang 金乡
- Town
- Location in Zhejiang
- Coordinates: 27°25′59″N 120°36′34″E
- Country: China
- Province: Zhejiang
- Prefecture: Wenzhou
- County: Cangnan

Jinxiang is a town under the jurisdiction of Cangnan County, Wenzhou, Zhejiang Province, People's Republic of China, bordered by the East China Sea, located at the junction of Zhejiang and Fujian, with an area of 43.55 square kilometers. Jinxiang dialect is spoken mainly in the town, and the "Man" dialects and Minnan dialects are spoken in some rural areas. Jinxiang is surrounded by mountains on three sides and the sea outside the mountains. It is originally a rocky reef area made of coastal sand and alluvial soil.

== History ==
Jinxiang has a history of over 600 years. During the Ming Dynasty, Jinxiang was the front line of sea defense and an important place for the Chinese army to fight against the Japanese in wars.

1387 (Ming Hongwu two decades) Jinxiang fortification guard set for southern Zhejiang coastal city.

Jinxiang (金乡镇), historically known as a Ming dynasty sea-defense fortress, has a history of approximately 636 years.

== Administrative divisions ==
Jinxiang administers the following village-level administrative division units:

Phoenix Community, Fengle Community, Qiushan Community, Chating Community, Qixing Community, Weiqian Community, Haiyan Community, Jinxing Village, Chengzhong Village, Wuyi Village, Xingguang Village, Shishan Village, Huangniao Village, Meilingjiao Village, Meilingtou Village, Shibabu Village, Liangting Village, Ganxi Village, Niuwolong Village, Longpanji Village, Huli Village, Zhumeiling Village, Daqiao Village, Qiaotoulian Village, Xitou Village, Wayao Village, Qian Bao Village, Zhangliangshan Village, Yongxing Village, Banjunlian Village, Hewei Village, Zhengjialou Village, Zhengjiayang Village, Nanyang Village, Dongdianbao Village, Huangjinhe Village, Zhuzhaoyang Village, Wujiabao Village, Dai Jiabao Village, Dongdaitou Village, Caijia Village, Dongtian Village, Honglingxia Village, Chixin Village, Dongshan Cai Village, Sujia Village, Qianzhang Village, Yuzhuang Village, Daqiaotou Village, Yangmei Village, Huangjiazhai Village, Four Daixu Village, Linjiatong Village, Shanggantou Village, Fangxia Village, Didian Village, Tangjianyang Village, Shangbao Village, Fengdian Village, Hetou Village, Dachuji Village, Lingfeng Village, Lingfeng Huang Village, Xia Bamei Village, Qianbanyang Village, Houbanyang Village, Xiazetang Village, Xiaze Village, Kengnan Village, Kengdong Village, Fengshuiwan Village, Xingyu Village and Xingao Village.

== Population ==
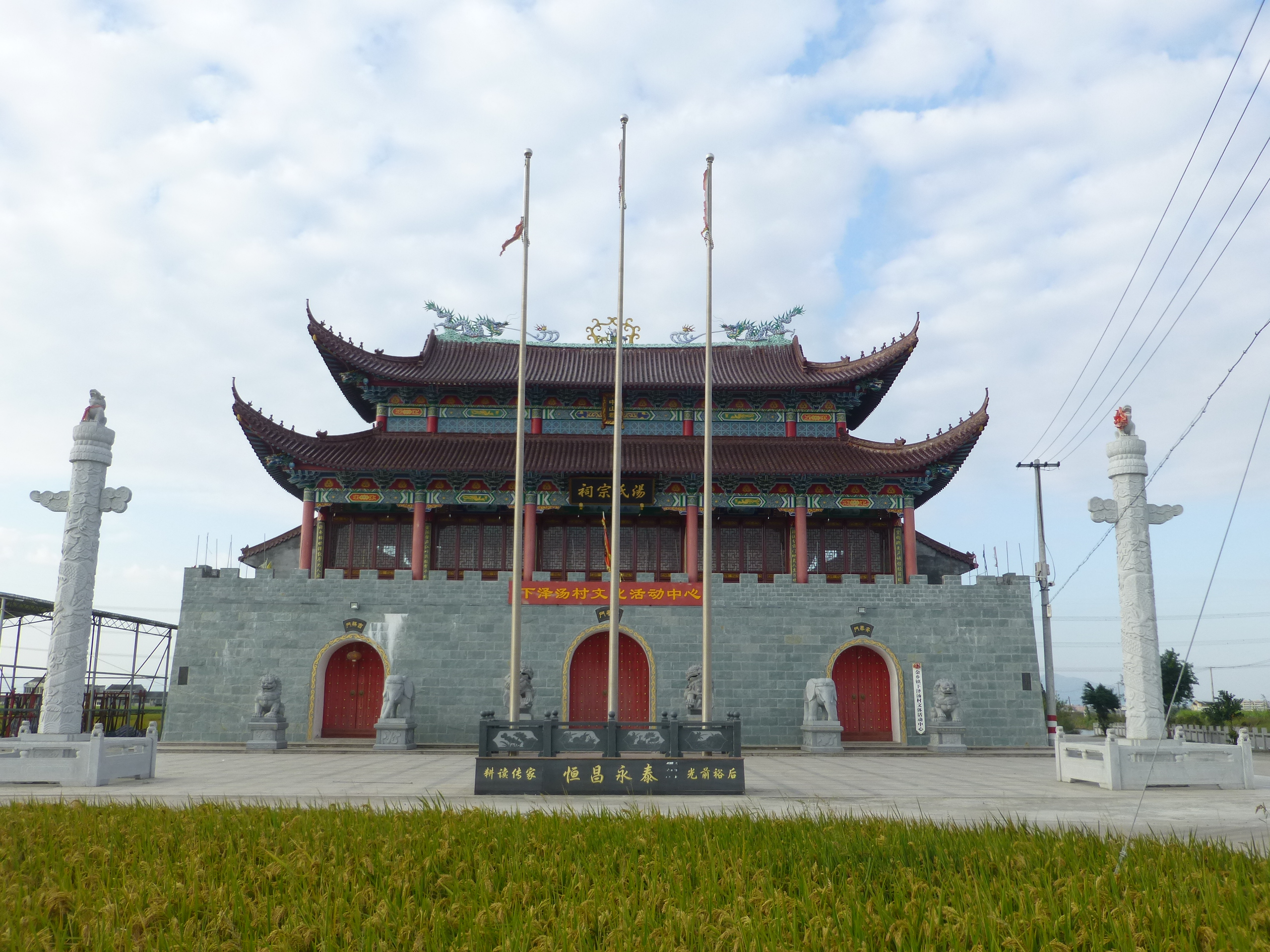
Tang's Ancestral Hall and Village Wenxiu Activity Center in Xiazetang Village, Jinxiang Town

The town has a population of 85,600. The common language in the town is Jinxiang dialect, and in some villages is Hokkien.

== Economy ==
Jinxiang is the first town in Wenzhou with an output value of more than 100 million yuan.

The main industries of Jinxiang include composite materials, packaging and printing, plastic film, trademark logo as its the four pillar industries, the production of calendar, notebooks, invitation card as the country's three major production bases, and self-adhesive materials and printing industry as the characteristics of the economic pattern. Well-known enterprises include Zhejiang Cangnan County Jinxiang Badge Factory Co., Ltd. (Sino-US joint venture Wenzhou Jiamei Arts & Crafts Co., Ltd.), Zhejiang Tongchun Brewing Co., Ltd.

== Well-Known Corporations ==
=== Zhejiang Tongchun Brewing Co., Ltd. ===
In 1919, Chen Tao'an, a Jinxiang native, and his partners co-founded the "Tongchun Sauce Garden".

In 2022, the company has a large scale, complete varieties and relatively high market share in the Brewing industry of Wenzhou area.

=== Zhejiang Jinxiang Badge Factory Co., Ltd. ===
Jinxiang Badge Factory was founded by Chen Jiashu in 1983, mainly produces badges, signs and badges, pendants, cards, military and police badges, and other crafts. Jinxiang Badge Factory has produced souvenirs badges for various major international and Chinese national events, such as the Asian Games, East Asian Games, National Paralympic Games and FIFA World Cup.

- In 1993, Jinxiang Badge Factory produced 680,000 sets of police badges for the United States Police Department.
- In 1997, when President Jiang Zemin visited the United States for the first time, a medallion with the design of Chinese national treasure panda and American national bird bald eagle on his chest was made by Jinxiang Badge Factory.
- In 2019, Jinxiang Badge Factory made 2.6 million badges for FIFA World Cup.
- In 2021, Jinxiang Badge Factory produced nearly 6 million honorable plaques issued to veterans for Shaanxi Province and Sichuan Province, valued at more than 100 million yuan.
- In 2022, all the emblems and badges for the Asian Games which will be held in Hangzhou will be produced and supplied by Jinxiang Badge Factory.

== Celebrities ==
=== Zhang Yuning ===
Zhang Yuning, 张玉宁, is a Chinese National Soccer Player, a forward player for Beijing Guoan in the professional Chinese Super league. He was born on January 5, 1997, in Jinxiang, Cangnan, Wenzhou, Zhejiang. In 2008, at age of 11, he played for Zhejiang Greentown Youth Football Team. In 2015, he transferred to SBV Vitesse, becoming the youngest Chinese player to play in the European League. In 2016, he was selected by the Chinese National Team and scored 2 goals on his debut, becoming the youngest Chinese soccer player who scores on the debut in the history of the Chinese National Soccer Team. In 2017, he was transferred to West Bromwich Albion in the Premier League, then loaned to SV Werder Bremen, a German professional soccer club, becoming the youngest Chinese player who played in the Bundesliga. In 2019, he transferred to Beijing Guoan.

=== Wang Junyao ===
Wang Junyao (1966－November 7, 2004), is the founder of Juneyao Group, Entrepreneurs of the People's Republic of China, Member of the Tenth National Committee of the Chinese People's Political Consultative Conference, "the first person to charter a plane in China". On July 28, 1991, he contracted the first airline from Wenzhou to Changsha, pioneering the private charter of civil aviation in China. On April 5, 1992, he established Wenzhou Tianlong Packer Industrial Co., China's first private air charter company. In 1994, he established Junyao Dairy Company, and next year established Wenzhou Juneyao Group Co. In 2000, he invested 300 million yuan on acquire 45 acres of land in Shanghai and moved the operation center, offices and scientific research center of Juneyao Group to Shanghai. By 2004, the Juneyao Group he founded had three major sectors: aviation, dairy and property investment, with total assets of 3.5 billion yuan. On November 7, 2004, Wang Junyao died at age 38 due to incurable intestinal cancer.

== Landmarks ==
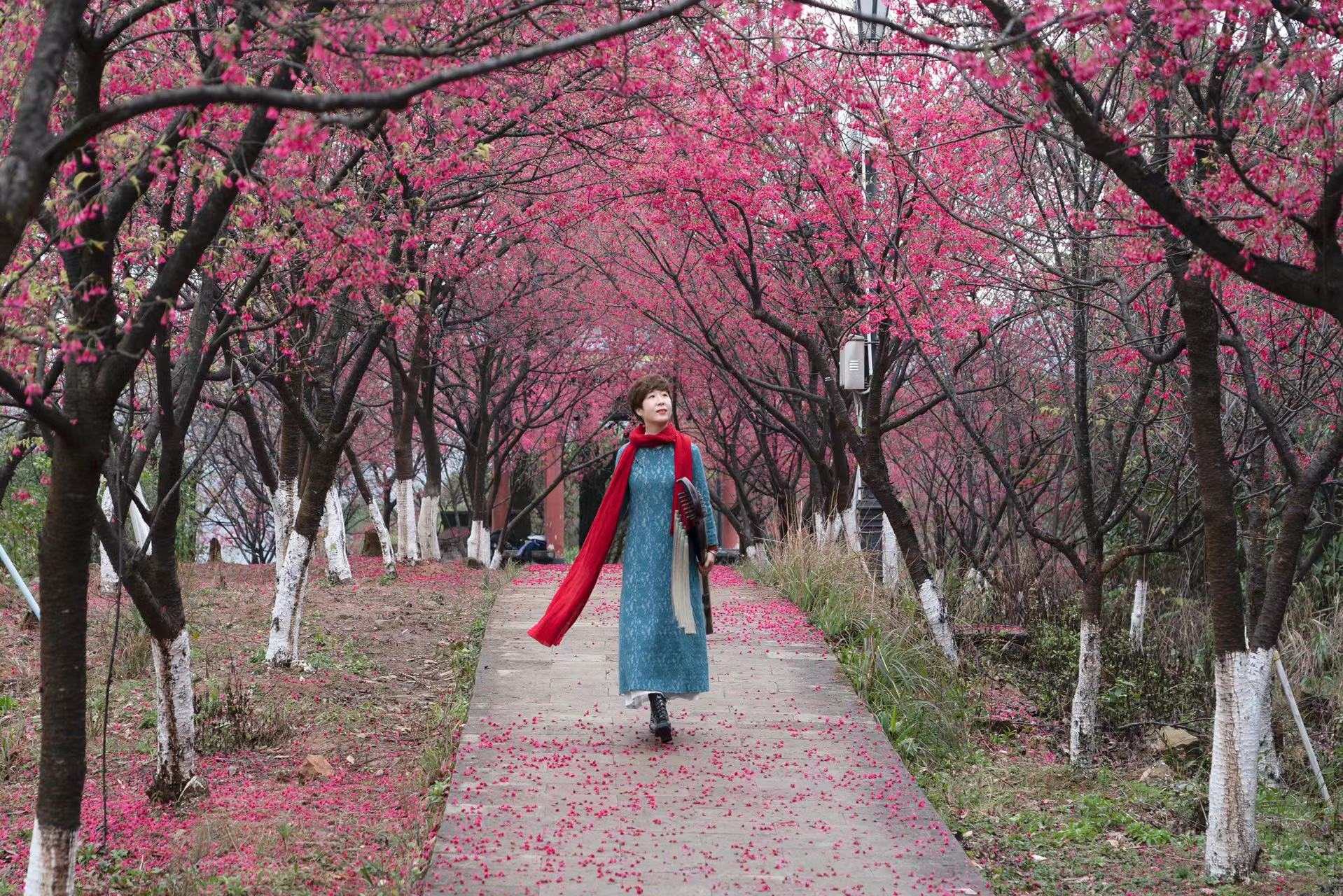
Cherry Blossom Revenue in Lion Mountain

=== Lion Mountain / Shizi Mountain ===
Shizi Mountain is located in the northeast of Jinxiang. The highest point of Lion Hill is about 60 meters. The outline and shape of the mountain looks like a lion, so people named it Lion Mountain. There is a park built on the mountain, called Lion Mountain Park, was built in 1983 with funding from Jinxiang entrepreneurs. The Park is famous for its cherry blossoms that bloom in spring and plum blossoms in winter. The species of cherry blossoms and plum blossoms in Lion Mountain Park is called Da Hong Ying and red plum blossoms, were donated and planted by local entrepreneurs and Jinxiang Government. As of 2017, there are more than 300 cherry blossom trees on both sides of a 700-meter-long road in Lion Mountain, which is the main scenic spot of the Lion Mountain during the blooming season.

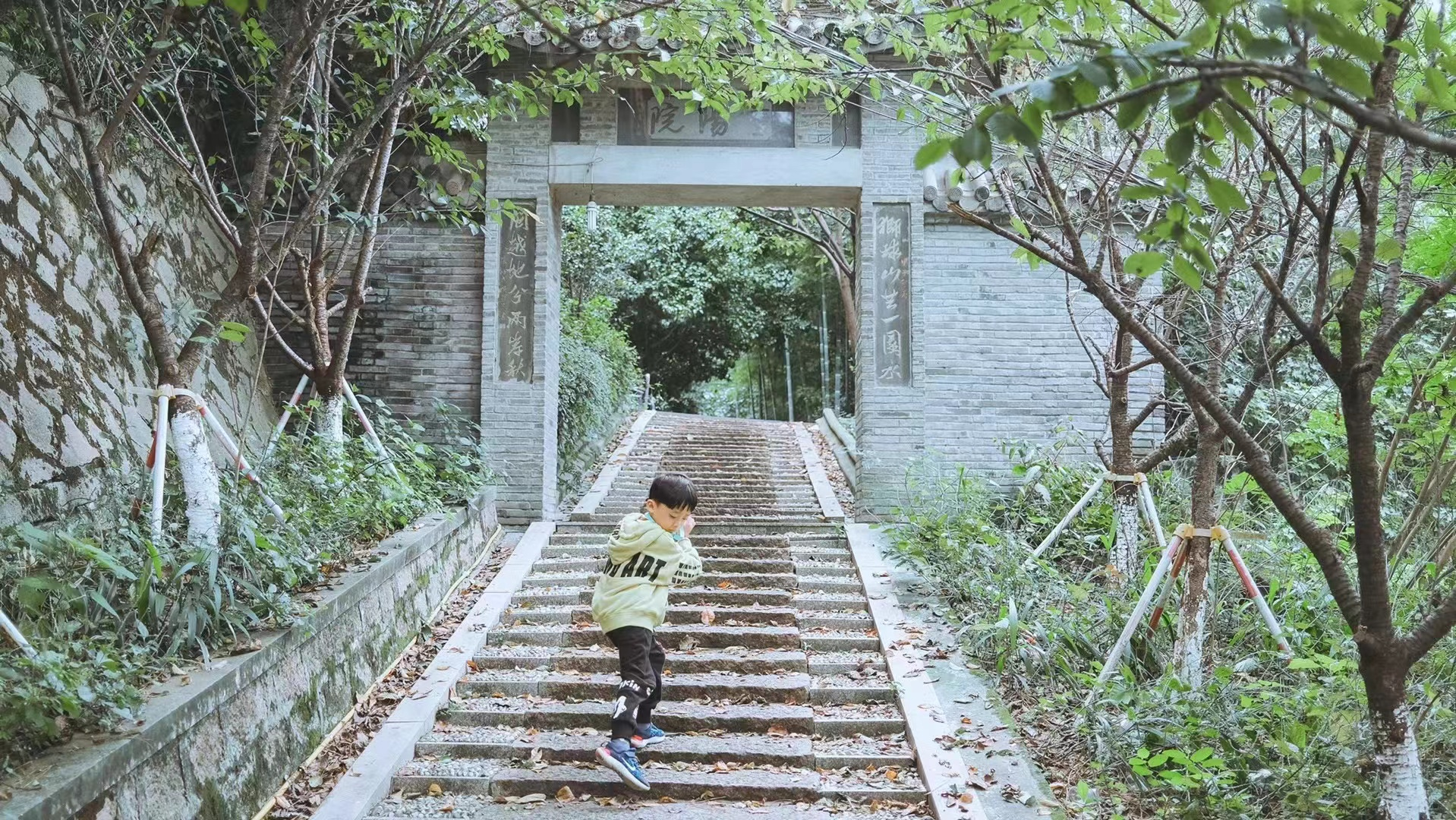
Lion Mountain Gate

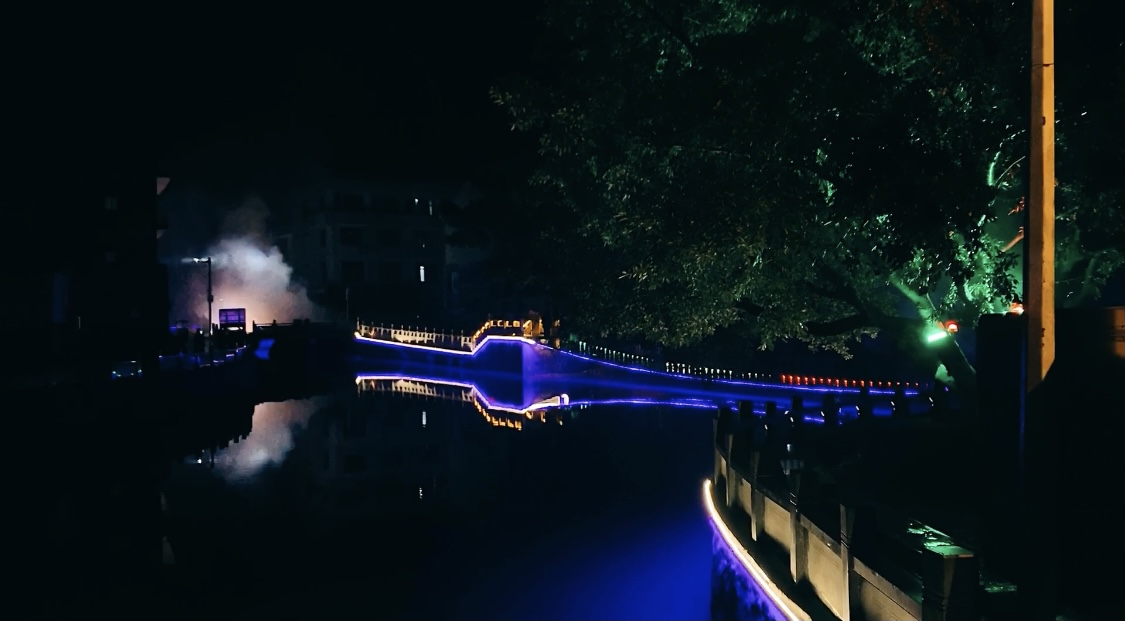
Jinxiang Nanmen Park at night

=== Jinxiang Museum ===
Jinxiang Museum is located in Yingxu Road, center of Jinxiang, covers an area of 1,500 m^{2}. It was built in the early period of Republic of China (about 1912), with brick and wood mixed structure, which shows a unique typical 'Baroque' architecture style. The land originally belonged to a rich Family ("Fangs Family") of Jinxiang. After the liberation of China, it was confiscated by the Province Government and used as a military barracks, then it was used as the office of Jinxiang Government. In 2004, it was listed as a "Cultural Protection Unit" of Cangnan County, Zhejiang Province, and then rebuilt into Jinxiang Museum.

Jinxiang Museum has two floors. The first floor mainly exhibits the artifacts and history of humanities before the Ming Dynasty. The second floor hall mainly presents the historical changes and development of Jinxiang from the Qing Dynasty to modern times.

== Traditional Food ==
=== Sugar Chao Mi ===
Chao Mi is a classic traditional dessert of Jinxiang, mainly consisting of rice, peanuts and sugar, and dry osmanthus. It is one of the common snacks residents will buy during Chinese New Year or the Spring Festival. Nowadays, Jinxiang Chao Mi is a well known desert in southern Zhejiang and sold in both domestic and international markets through the online shopping.
