= Fanshan, Cangnan County =

Fanshan 矾山
- Town
- Location in Zhejiang
- Coordinates: 27°20′21″N 120°30′31″E
- Country: China
- Province: Zhejiang
- Prefecture: Wenzhou
- County: Cangnan

Fanshan is a Town in Cangnan, Zhejiang, China. Known as the "World Alum Capital", it accounts for 60% of the world and 70% of China. The "Wenzhou alum mine" living "remains", which has been mining and refining alum for more than 600 years, was listed as Zhejiang Cultural Relics Protection Unit in April 2007, and the common language of some villages is Hokkien.

== History ==
More than 600 years ago, this was still a deserted place. According to legend, Sichuan refugee Qin Fu took his wife and children to shelter from the rain under a rock cave in Jilong Mountain. The family moved a few stones and piled up stoves to cook. A few days later, they were surprised to find that the stones that used to set the stove to burn were weathered into gravel after being soaked by rain, and they were also mixed with many small transparent beads, shining brightly in the sun. Qin Fu put a few capsules into his mouth to taste, the taste was sour, and he threw it into the muddy water depression beside him. The beads melted, but the muddy water cleared. Qin Fu's son suffered from heatstroke and had a stomachache. Drinking a bowl of water that melted small beads turned out to be fine. Qin Fu determined that it was a miracle medicine and named it "Clear Water Bead". From then on, Qin Fu often came here to make "clear water beads" to clarify turbid water or relieve heat. The news spread, villagers followed suit, and the alum treasure was discovered. According to Ming Hongzhi's "Wenzhou Fuzhi", it is found in Pingyang Chishan (now Cangnan Fanshan). No one has collected it. The people have obtained the method. The clear one is alum, and the turbid one is alum. . This is the earliest written record about the mining and production of alum mines.

== Basic Overview ==
Fanshan Town is located in the mountainous basin in the southeast of Cangnan County, Zhejiang Province, with an average elevation of 280 meters. The town is named after the alum rich in it. It is known as the "World Alum Capital" and is the oldest mine market town in southern Zhejiang. It is a one-star civilized town, a municipal sanitary town and a model town in Wenzhou City. It is one of the strong economic and cultural towns in Cangnan County. In April 2011, the establishment of Nansong Town and Changchan Township was abolished, and their administrative areas were merged into Fanshan Town. After the adjustment, Fanshan Town has jurisdiction over 11 residential areas and 31 administrative villages. The town government is in Xinhua Street.

== Administrative division ==
Fanshan, Cangnan County governs the following village-level administrative divisions

Nanxia Community, Neijie Community, Nanyang Community, Xinjie Community, Daputou Community, Longtongtou Community, Wangjiadong Community, Shuiwei Community, Fudewan Community, Nanxia Village, Guluxia Village, Nanpu Village, Zhongcun, Ding Villages, Jindouyang Village, Yangzishan Village, Qingshanhou Village, Nijiashan Village, Gancha Village, Puping Village, Kelingjiao Village, Ganqi Village, Gongqiao Nei Village, Shitoujiao Village, Neishan Village, Shenjiakeng Village, Zhong Ao Village, Wangjiayang Village, Santiaoxi Village, Daxinyang Village, Xingchang Village, Gaofeng Village and Hedingshan Tea Farm.

== Natural Information ==
Fanshan Town is rich in resources and rich in resources. In addition to the world's largest reserves of alunite resources, there are also minerals such as sulfur ore, kaolin, silver limestone, graphite, and a wide range of agricultural and sideline products, economic crops, and seafood products.

== Traffic ==
Fanshan has convenient transportation. The 78 provincial highway runs through the whole territory. It is 100km and 27km away from the Wenzhou Airport and 104 National Highway lines, 30km from the provincial trade port of Taiwan to Xiaguan Port and Zhongdun Wharf. 10 kilometers each from Qianqi Yaojiayu Wharf in Fuding City, Fujian Province. It is the transportation hub and "throat" of the Nangang area of Cangnan County, and the commodity distribution center and transportation gathering point in the surrounding areas of Mazhan, Chixi, Southern Song and Qianqi.

== Fud Bay Village ==
Fudewan Village is a village that was born and flourished for alum mining and refining in history. It is one of the representatives of Zhejiang's industrial heritage. The industrial site is located in the traditional terroir settlement of Fudewan Village. More than six hundred years of alum mining and refining not only left the alum mine site in the village, which is a relatively complete mining production and living system in the 1950s, but also left behind. A large number of mining caves (goafs), streets, stone stairs, ancient trees, ancient wells, and characteristic industrial village dwellings scattered all over the corners of the village have gradually formed the current mining caves (from the mountain to the bottom of the mountain). The basic layout of mining area) → residential area → alum refining area.

As early as 2014, Fudewan Bay was rated as the first batch of Chinese traditional villages and the sixth batch of Chinese historical and cultural villages. In 2016, it was rated as an excellent case of immovable cultural relics protection in Zhejiang Province. Its development process from the mountain to the flat land under the mountain is a special case in the history of urban development. On September 1, 2016, Fudewan Miner Village won the "UNESCO 2016 Asia-Pacific Cultural Heritage Protection Honor Award". The award-winning comment of the judging committee is: “The rehabilitation project of the Fudewan Mining Village is commendable for its comprehensive and culturally sensitive protection and reuse projects. Local villagers, non-governmental organizations (NGOs) and With the joint efforts of government agencies, most traditional houses have been successfully preserved in accordance with the principles of heritage protection, while abandoned industrial facilities such as weathering ponds have been restored as public or tourist facilities. Through continuous maintenance and management and community participation, this The project has set a model for other industrial communities in China that are at a critical stage of modernization but have heritage protection values."
