= Cangnan County =

Cangnan 苍南县
- County
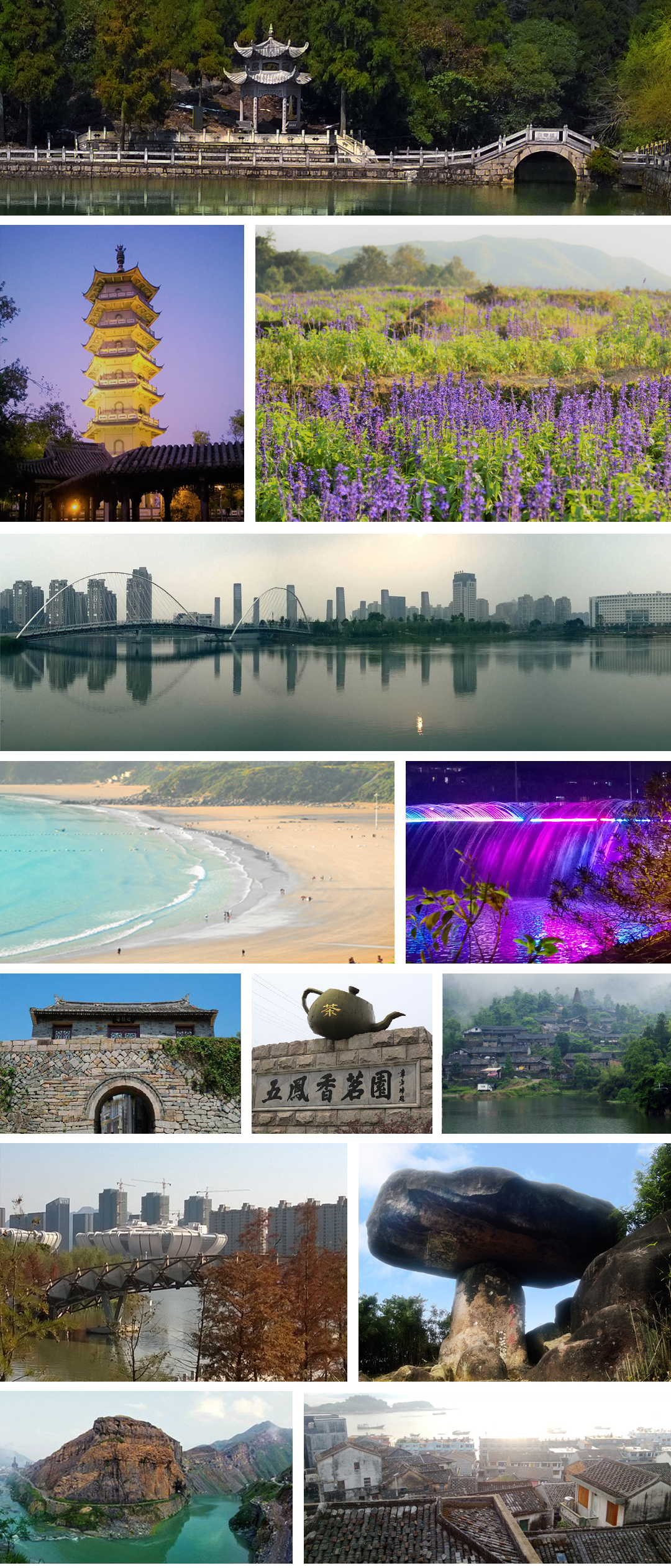
- Lake in Mount Yucang, Lingshan Pagoda, Huayang Agricultural Sightseeing Park, Lingxi Lake, Yuliao Beach, Jiangbin Park, Pucheng Fortified City, Wufeng Tea Garden, Wanyao Ancient Village, Cangnan New City, Mushroom Rock in Mount Yucang, Fanshan, Xiaguan Fishing Village

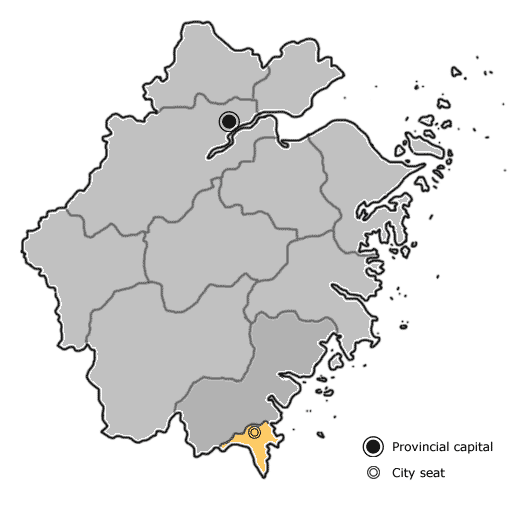
- Location of Cangnan County in Zhejiang
- Coordinates: 27°31′N 120°25′E
- Country: People's Republic of China
- Province: Zhejiang

Government
  - Type: County

Area
  - County: 1,261.08 km^{2} (486.91 sq mi)
  - Urban: 170.9 km^{2} (66.0 sq mi)

Population (2010)
  - County: 1,184,600
  - Density: 939.35/km^{2} (2,432.9/sq mi)
  - Urban: 279,000
  - Urban density: 1,630/km^{2} (4,230/sq mi)
- Demonym: Cangnan People
- Time zone: UTC+8 (China Standard)
- Postal code: 325800
- GDP (Nominal): 2015
- Total: CNY 42.50 billion
- Per capita: CNY 35,877 (US$ 5,760)
- Growth: ▲7.89%
- Lingxi (2015): CNY 12.5 billion
- Licence plate prefixes: 浙C
- Regional variety: Zhenan Min dialect, Wenzhou dialect, Jinxiang dialect
- Website: Cangnan China
- City tree Camphor laurel (Cinnamomum camphora); City flower Rhododendron Simsii Planch (Rhododendron Simsii Planch)

Cangnan County (simplified Chinese: 苍南县; traditional Chinese: 蒼南縣; pinyin: Cāngnán Xiàn) is a county in the prefecture-level city of Wenzhou in southern Zhejiang, China. The county government is in Lingxi. Cangnan has 20 towns, 14 townships, and two nationality townships. Cangnan and Taishun are a part of the Min Dong, Eastern Min cultural region of Zhejiang province. Wenzhou dialect and Jinxiang dialect, are also spoken.

Founded in 1981, Cangnan County is the south gate of Zhejiang Province, the major birthplace of the "Wenzhou Pattern" as well as an open door to the outside world authorised by the State Council. Its total land area is 1,261 square kilometres and its sea area is 3,783 square kilometres. Governing 10 towns, two minority towns and with a registered population of 1.3 million people, it is the most populous county in Zhejiang. In 2014, the county realised a GDP of US$6.3bn and total fiscal revenue of US$658m.

The annual outputs of the packaging-printing and plastic-plating industries are 15 per cent and 20 per cent of national outputs respectively. The annual sales volume of the gift industry is about 10 per cent of China's sales volume, and the area has acquired 14 golden "Guo Zihao" business cards such as "China Printing City".

Nowadays, Cangnan is implementing the development strategy of "double-sea, double-district". The construction of the Zhejiang-Taiwan (Cangnan) Economic and Trade Co-operation Zone focuses on: the construction of core platforms, advancing deep industrial connections, promoting comprehensive co-operation and exchange, pushing forward institutional innovation and accelerating the formation of the pattern of "three-cores, three-passageways". Cangnan is actively engaging in constructing a vigorous ecological, industrial and trading coastal city.

== Administration divisions ==
Cangnan is part of the greater Municipal region of Wenzhou, It comprises 10 towns and two Ethnic towns, which covers 1,261.08 square kilometres, 28 square kilometres of which are urban area of 1,184,600 people (2010 estimate).

Map
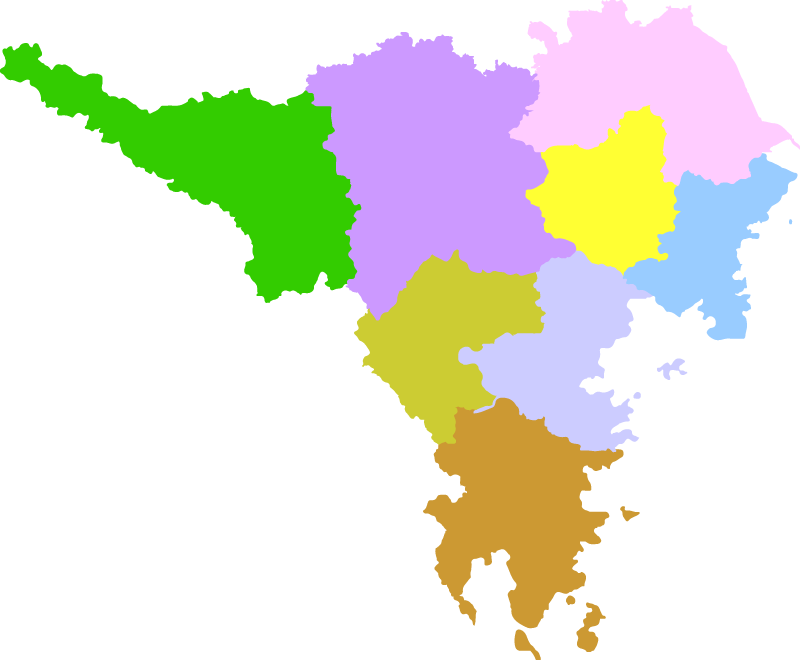

== Population ==
The seventh national census in 2020 concluded that Cangnan County has a resident population of 840,000 people as compared to the result of 785,000 people that was calculated by the sixth national census in 2010. A total population increase of 55,000 people with an increase rate of 7.01% was reached during the period of 2010 to 2020 with an average annual growth rate of 0.68%.

== Economy ==
The overall industrial economy of Cangnan County maintained a smooth operation in 2013. The annual total industrial output value of 67,976,000,000 RMB was achieved in 2013, of which more than 24,938,000,000 RMB of industrial output value was reached. This was following by the completion of a planned industrial investment of 7,741,000,000 RMB. As the traditional-manufacturing industry has not yet fully regained its vitality in 2013 after it experienced its declining, a new force of 37 high-tech enterprises suddenly rose in Cangnan County, which gave Cangnan County a strong boost in its development of industrial economy in 2013. As the result, the annual total industrial output value of 3,751,000,000 RMB with an increase rate of 26.55% were achieved by the year of 2013. As compared to the year of 2012, there were six more companies were found in 2013. Cangnan County had one company achieved an industrial output value over 500,000 RMB, two companies over 300,000 RMB, and four companies over their first billion RMB.[2]

=== County New Area ===
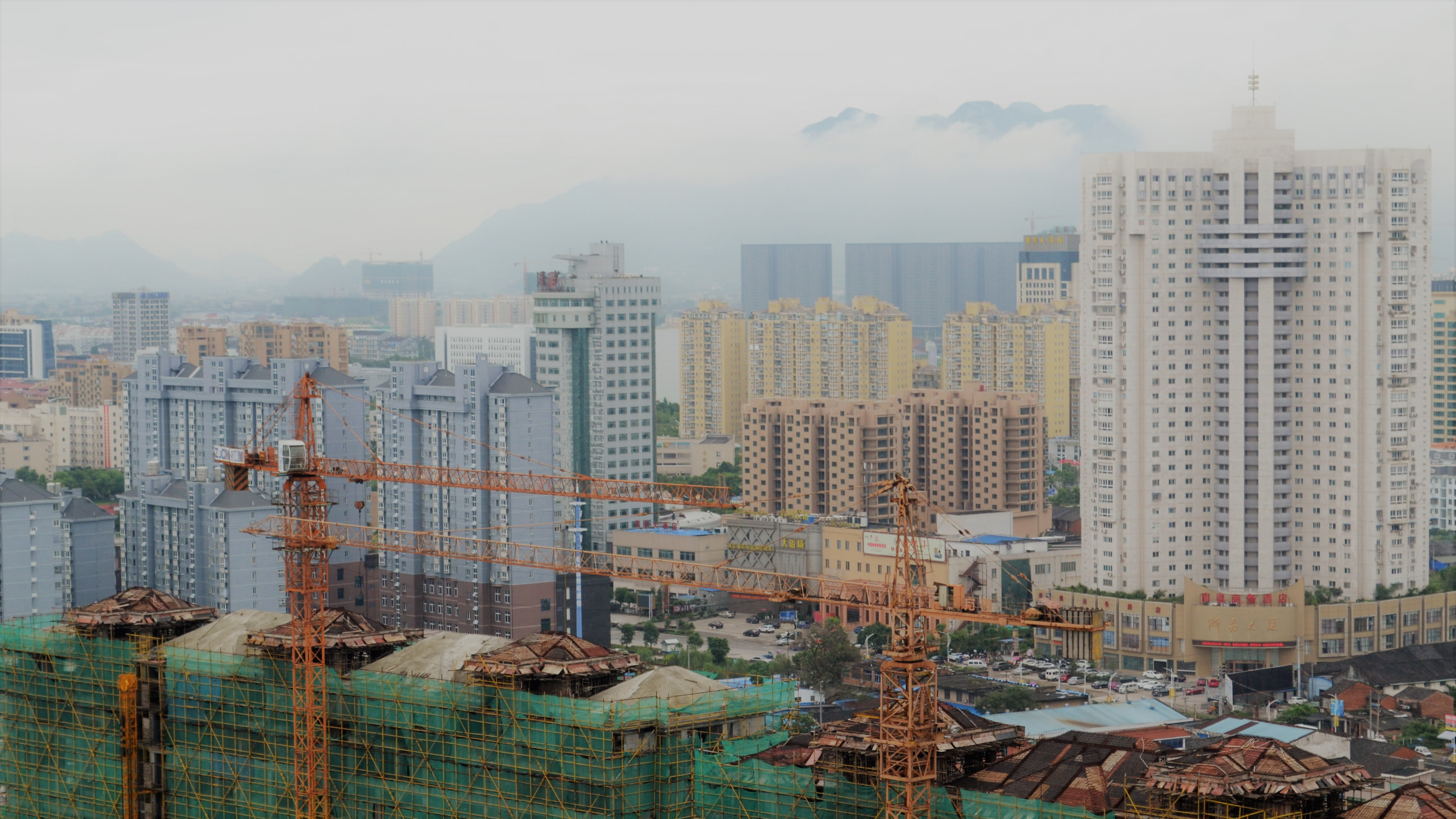
New Area of Cangnan

The County New Area is located in the east of Lingxi New Area, close to the 104 National Highway, the entrance of the Ningbo-Taizhou- Wenzhou Expressway and Cangnan Railway Station. It is the main area of urbanisation in the county, planned to be about 6.56 square kilometres. The infrastructure of the new area has recently been greatly improved. Based on the planning pattern of "one centre, two shafts and two blocks", the new area is being constructed with administration, trade, finance, culture, sports and living areas all integrated as a whole. Project proposals for investment include a County New Area complex, five-star hotel and economic headquarters building in the near future.

=== Cangnan Industrial Park ===
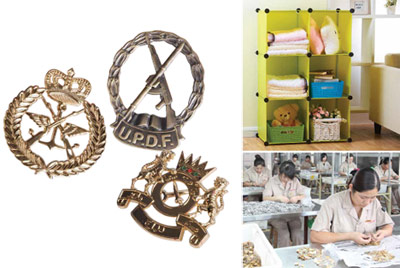
Cangnan Industrial Park

Cangnan Industrial Park is a provincial-level development zone authorised by the Zhejiang Provincial People's Government in March 2006. It is also the plot of provincial-level co-operation granted by that same government. It is located between the entrances of Hushan and Xiaojiang on the Ningbo-Taizhou-Wenzhou Expressway, with the 104 National Highway passing through it. The regulated planning area is 12.5 square kilometres and the reserved expansion space is 30 square kilometres. In recent years, 55 enterprises have been brought in, with a total investment of US$814.4m, and are now in production, with an annual GDP of more than US$977.2m.

A series of specialised industrial parks has been established, including home furnishings, electromechanical, clothing and a new energy industrial park. The industrial parks will play an important role as the "main battlefield" of industry transformation in the county, focusing on export-oriented, scientific and technological and efficiency projects. Electromechanical products, clothing, auto and motorbike parts, instruments, solar photovoltaic and other hi-tech industries will be the key to future development.

=== Zhejiang-Taiwan (Cangnan) Economic and Trade Co-operation Zone ===
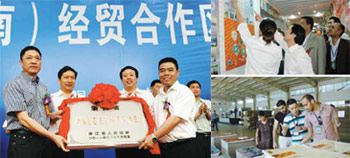
Zhejiang-Taiwan (Cangnan) Economic and Trade Co-operation Zone

The Zhejiang-Taiwan (Cangnan) Economic and Trade Co-operation Zone is the first provincial-level economic and trade co-operation zone with Taiwan, authorised by the Zhejiang Provincial People's Government in May 2011. With the territory of Cangnan as the strategic planning base for co-operation, it integrates the Cangnan Port (and its surrounding area) Industrial Base, Cangnan Industry Park, Taiwan Farmer's Innovation Park and other blocks to form an area of "one zone with various parks". The planned area of construction is up to 260 square kilometres.

With integration into Haixi, connecting with Taiwan and taking the lead in Zhejiang as its core responsibilities, the co-operation zone demonstrates the unique advantage that Cangnan and Taiwan have in their relationship with each other, allowing them to actively participate in the construction of "double-sea, double-district". With strategic policies, it tries to forge Zhejiang marine economic development and the Zhejiang Haixi Zone economic development, through communication about economy, trade, culture and personnel.

The annual outputs of the packaging-printing and plastic-plating industries are 15 per cent and 20 per cent of national outputs respectively

== Transportation ==
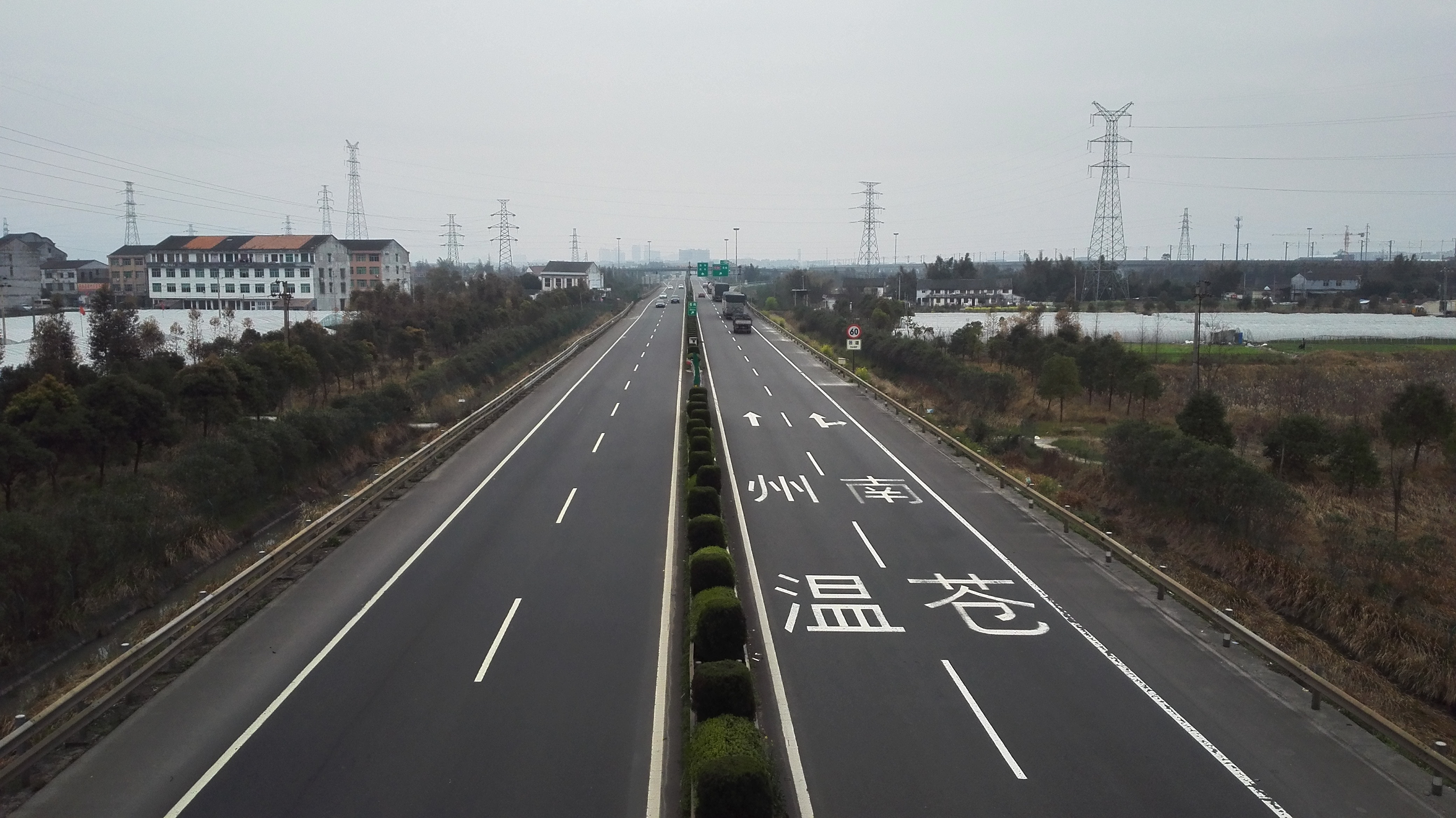
G15 Highway Lingxi

Cangnan has an advantageous location and convenient transportation links. It is located at the intersection of the Yangtze River Delta and Haixi district, in the middle of the mainland's "golden coastline". Transportation and communication are convenient here because the infrastructure is complete, with the 104 National Highway, Shenhai (Ningbo-Taizhou-Wenzhou) Highway and Wenzhou-Fuzhou railway passing through Xiaguan, Bacao and Yanting, with four ports also connecting the area. Also in use are the Provincial 78 Highway, Longjin Avenue, Century Avenue and Huanhai Road. Cangnan is only 60 kilometres away from Wenzhou Airport, and just 120 nautical miles from the port of Keelung, Taiwan.

=== Airport ===
Cangnan is served by the Wenzhou Longwan International Airport, which provides direct service to many destinations such as Italy, South Korea, Thailand, and Vietnam. Regional routes reach Hong Kong and Taipei. It has an extensive domestic route network within the PRC and is consistently ranked top 30 in passenger traffic among Chinese airports. The airport is located just outside the city in the Longwan District with direct bus service linking the airport with Downtown Lingxi and Longgang. A new elevated express highway is under construction between the airport and Cangnan.

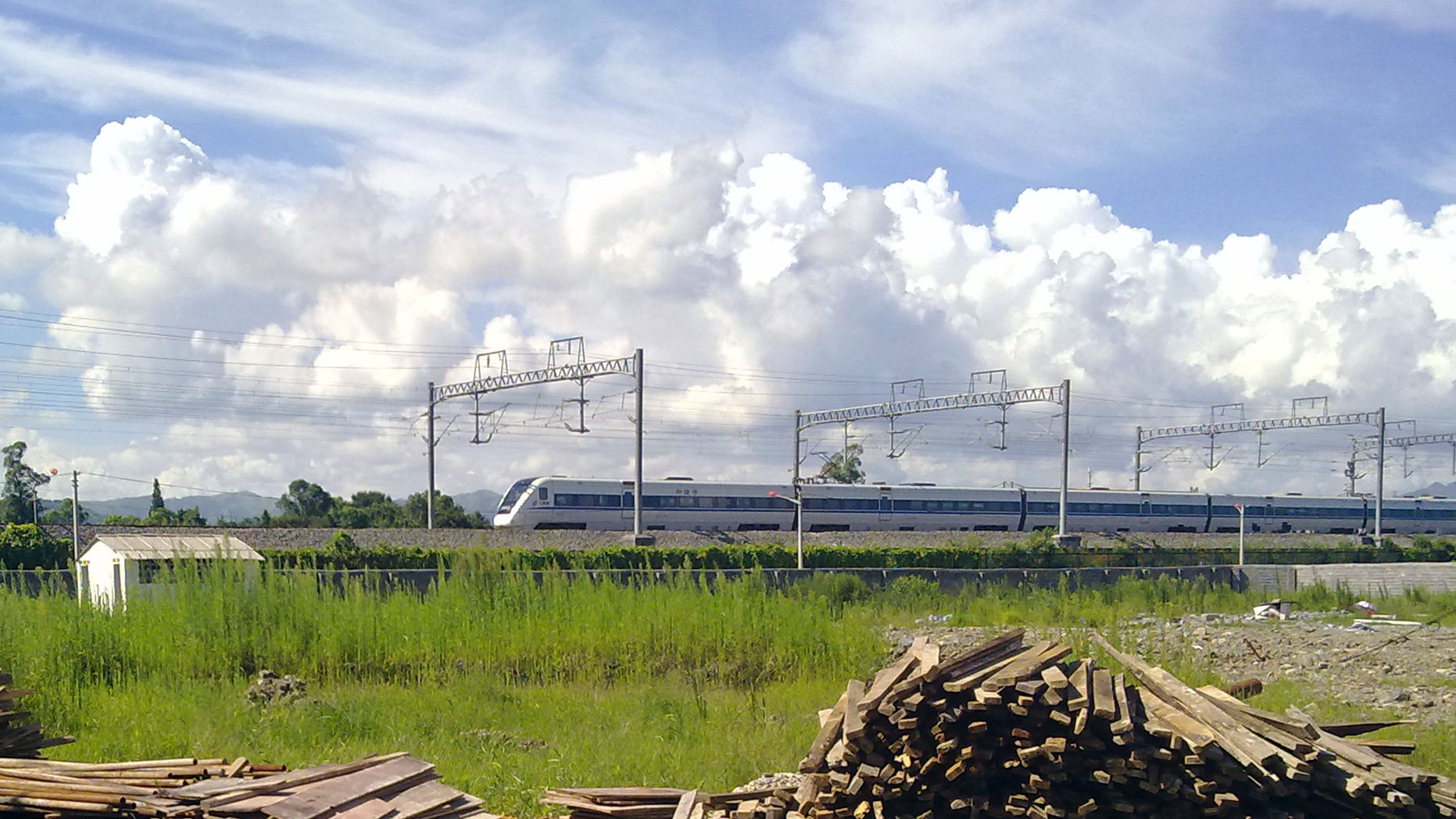
High Speed Train arriving at Cangnan Railway Station

=== Train ===
Cangnan sits on one of the busiest rail corridors (Yanhai High speed Railway) in China. The main rail way station is Cangnan Railway Station. It is one of the busiest of the county-level rail station in Zhejiang Province, consisting of two platforms that house the High Speed CRH service to Shanghai, Nanjing, Hangzhou, Beijing, Xuzhou, Lu'an and beyond.

=== Public Transportation ===
Central, north and west long-distance bus stations offer frequent coach service to nearby cities/towns within Zhejiang province, as well as surrounding provinces. Cangnan has an efficient public transportation network, consisting of a modern fleet of regular diesel bus, electric bus, taxi and disability scooters. The public bus service network expanding from downtown to many suburban areas. Bicycles and electric scooters are very popular. Cangnan has an extensive free public bike rental system.

== Education ==
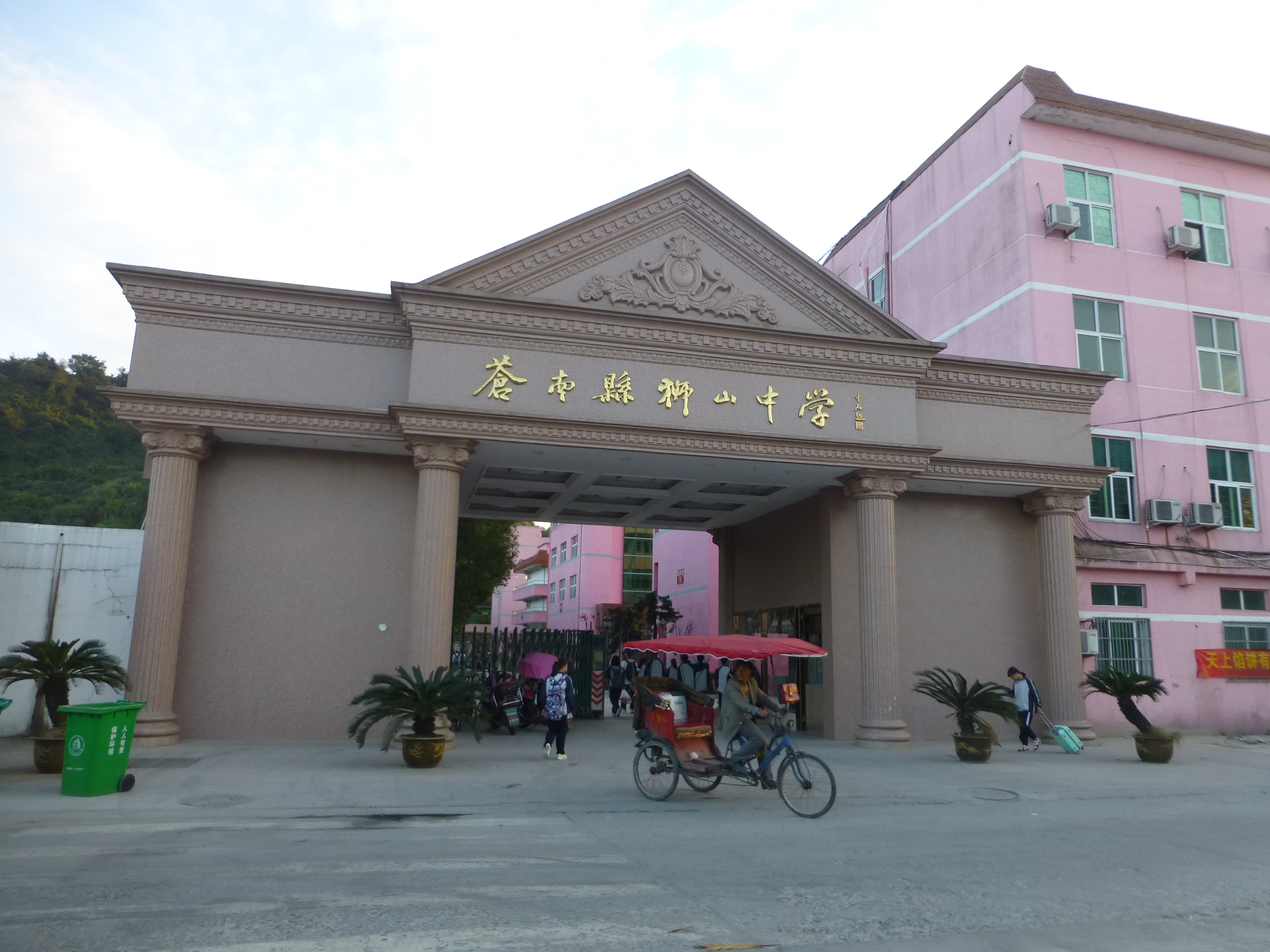
High School in Jinxiang

=== High schools ===
- Cangnan High School (formerly Cangnan No. 1 High School)
- Lingxi High School (established in 1956)
- Lingxi No. 2 Senior High School
- Lingxi No. 3 Senior High School (Cangnan Qiuzhi Senior High School)
- Longgang Senior High School
- Longgang No. 2 Senior High School
- Longgang No. 3 Senior High School
- Qianku Senior High School
- Yishan Senior High School
- Jinxiang Senior High School

=== Middle schools ===
- Lingxi No. 1 Junior High School

== Tourism ==
Cangnan has both mountains and sea, and is rich in resources. The coastline of the county is 252 kilometres and the usable mud flat area is more than 95 square kilometres. In particular, marine resources and the tourist economy have great development potential. Within its borders it has the acclaimed "Puzhuangsuo Castle", "Yucang Mountain" forest park and "Binhai-Yucang Mountain" scenic spot. It has numerous islands and sandy beaches, among which Yuliao is one of the largest sand beaches in Asia.

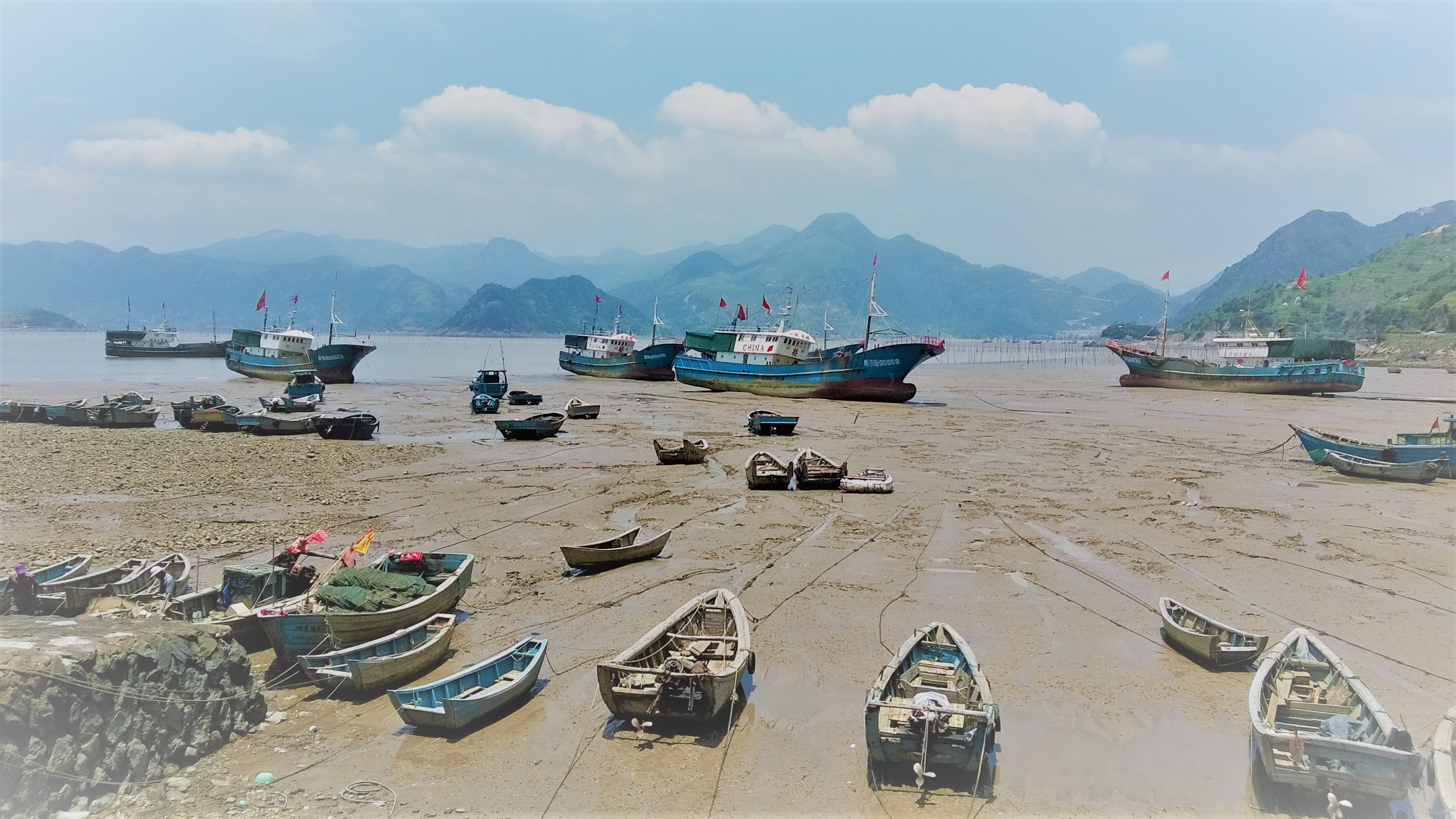
Coastal Area in Chixi Cangnan

== History ==
=== Historical sites ===
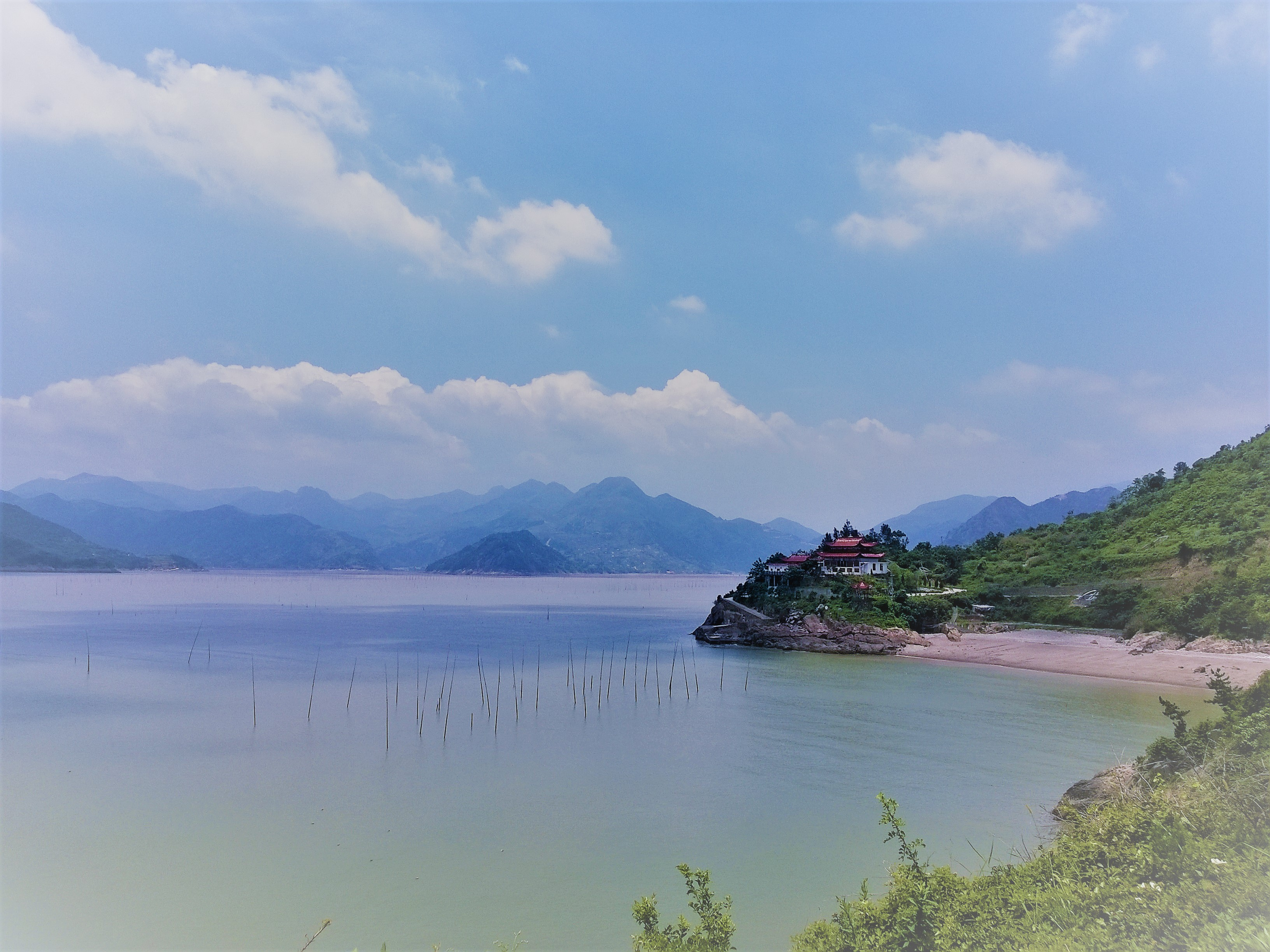
Coastal Area in Chixi Cangnan

- Stone Tombs in South Zhejiang (on the list of Major national historical and cultural sites (Zhejiang))
- Fortified city of Pucheng, a.k.a. Puzhuangsuo Fortress (restored)
- Fortified city of Wucheng (destroyed; only ruins exist)
- Chixi Wudong Bridge
