= Chuq =

Chuq or CHUQ may refer to:

- Çük, a holiday that was celebrated by Tatars, Chuvash, and Udmurt peoples
- CHUQ, an acronym for Centre hospitalier universitaire de Québec, a local hospital network in Quebec City, Canada

== See also ==
- Chal Chuq, Zanjan, Iran
- Chuuk (disambiguation)
- Chuck (disambiguation)
- Chuk (disambiguation)
- CHUC
