= Zhù (surname) =

Chinese family name

Zhù (Chinese: 祝) is a Chinese surname. (Chuk or Chok in Cantonese), meaning ‘wizard’, ‘prayers’, or ‘to pray’ in ancient Chinese. The origin of the name is either from Zhu (祝), an official post in ancient China in charge of chanting prayers during religious worship, or (ii) from Zhu (祝), the name of a fief located in modern-day Shandong province during the reign of King Wu of Zhou. According to a 2013 study, it was the 138th-most common surname in China, shared by 1,20,000 people or 0.090% of the population, with the province with the most being Zhejiang.

== Notable people ==
- Zhu Xudan (Chinese: 祝绪丹; born 15 April 1992), also known as Bambi Zhu, is a Chinese actress. She is known for her supporting role in Eternal Love and
- Jacky Chu (祝钒刚) is a Taiwanese actor and is a former member of Taiwanese group 183
- Zhu Zuoli (祝作利; pinyin: Zhù Zuólì; born January 1955) is a former Chinese politician who spent most of his career in Shaanxi Province. Zhu was
- Zhu Yifan (祝一帆; pinyin: Zhù Yīfān; born March 1, 1988, in Beijing) is a Chinese football player who currently plays as a midfielder for Nantong
- Lei Zhu (祝雷; born c. 1964) is an engineer and distinguished professor at the University of Macau. Zhu obtained his B.Eng. degree from the Nanjing
- Zhu Xuejun (祝学军; born December 1962) is a Chinese female scientist. She is a member of the Chinese Communist Party. Zhu was born in Shenyang.
- Zhu Xijuan (祝希娟) is a mainland Chinese film actress.
- Zhu Yunming (祝允明; 1461–1527) was a Chinese calligrapher, poet, writer, and scholar-official of the Ming dynasty, known as one of the "Four Talents of Wu"
- Zhu Junyi (祝均一; born February 1951 in Haining, Zhejiang) was a government official in Shanghai, China. Prior to his arrest during an investigation.
- Zhu Qinming (祝欽明), courtesy name Wensi (文思), was an official of the Tang dynasty and Wu Zetian's Zhou dynasty, serving as a chancellor
- Zhu Xingyuan (祝惺元; born 1880) was a politician and diplomat in the Republic of China.
- Zhu Linfang (祝林芳 born 1982 in Henan, China), is a Taekwondo practitioner.
