= Trust Territory Air Service =

Trust Territory of the Pacific Islands airline (1951–1968)

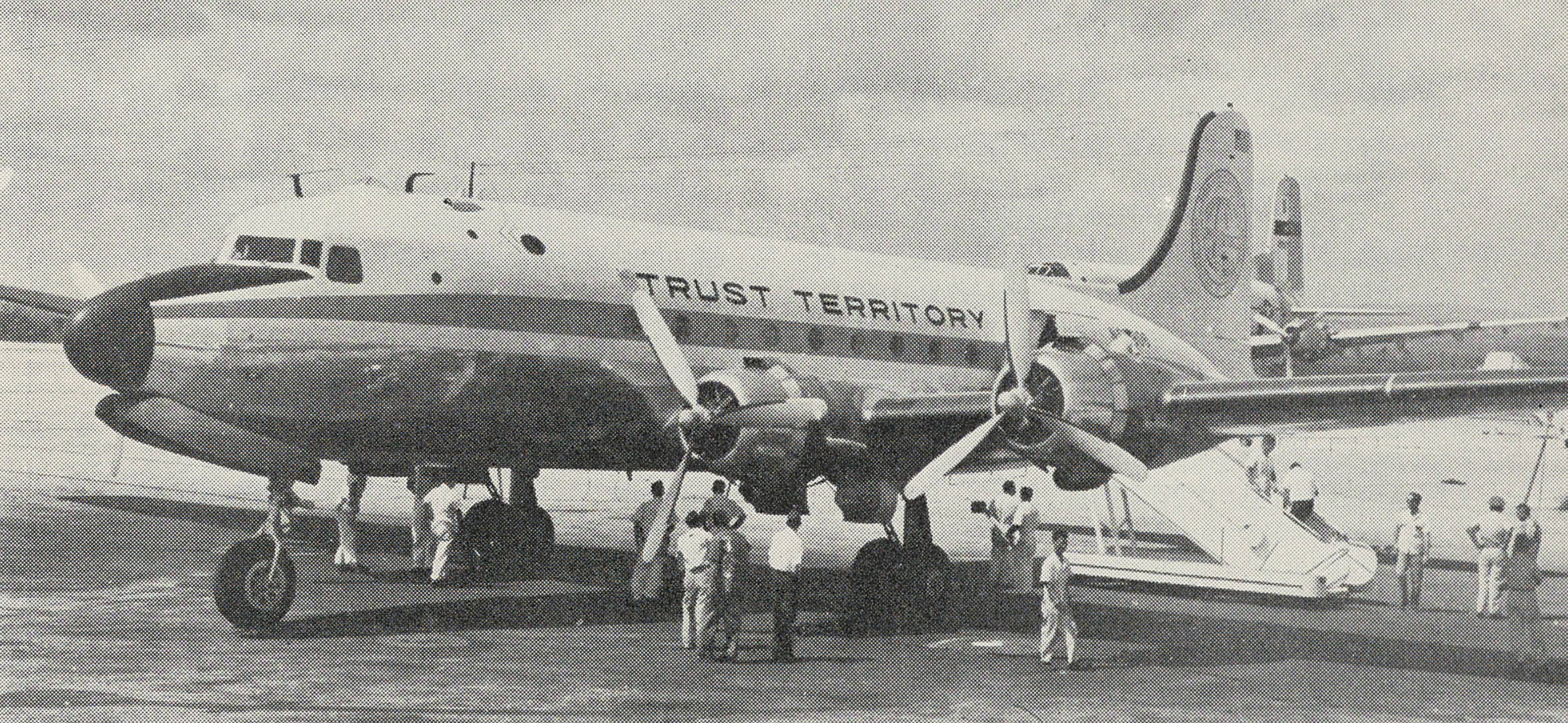
- DC-4 of the Pan Am era, 1963. A later livery replaced the TTPI seal on the tail with the 1965 Trust Territory flag. See External links
- Commenced operations: July 1, 1951 with Transocean Air Lines as contractor
- Ceased operations: May 15, 1968 with Pan Am as contractor
- Fleet size: see Fleet
- Destinations: see Destinations
- Parent company: Trust Territory of the Pacific Islands
- Headquarters: Saipan

Trust Territory Air Service (TTAS) was from 1951 to 1968 the government airline of the Trust Territory of the Pacific Islands (TTPI), a United Nations trust territory in Micronesia administered by the United States (1947–1994). Flights operated at Trust Territory direction by contractors, Transocean Air Lines from 1951 through 1960 followed by Pan American World Airways from 1960 to 1968 after Transocean collapsed. Amphibious aircraft provided 100% of service during the Transocean era, with Douglas DC-4s supplementing amphibians during the Pan Am era. TTPI owned the aircraft and provided most non-flying services.

Prior to July 1951, when responsibility for TTPI was transferred from the United States Department of the Navy to the United States Department of the Interior (Interior), air service within the TTPI was provided by the US Navy. After the middle of May 1968, Air Micronesia assumed TTPI air service duties.

During the time of TTAS, travel was at a very early stage of development in the Trust Territory. For example: in 1963, aircraft fuel still had to be strained before use at some islands (a lengthy process) because it was delivered in drums that were left unsheltered. In 1966, Saipan airport runway did not have lights; flights had to arrive in the daytime. The Federal Aviation Agency did not oversee flight operations in the Territory. In June 1968, the total number of hotel rooms in the entire Trust Territory was 111. In Guam (not part of the Territory), the number of hotel rooms was 298.

== History ==
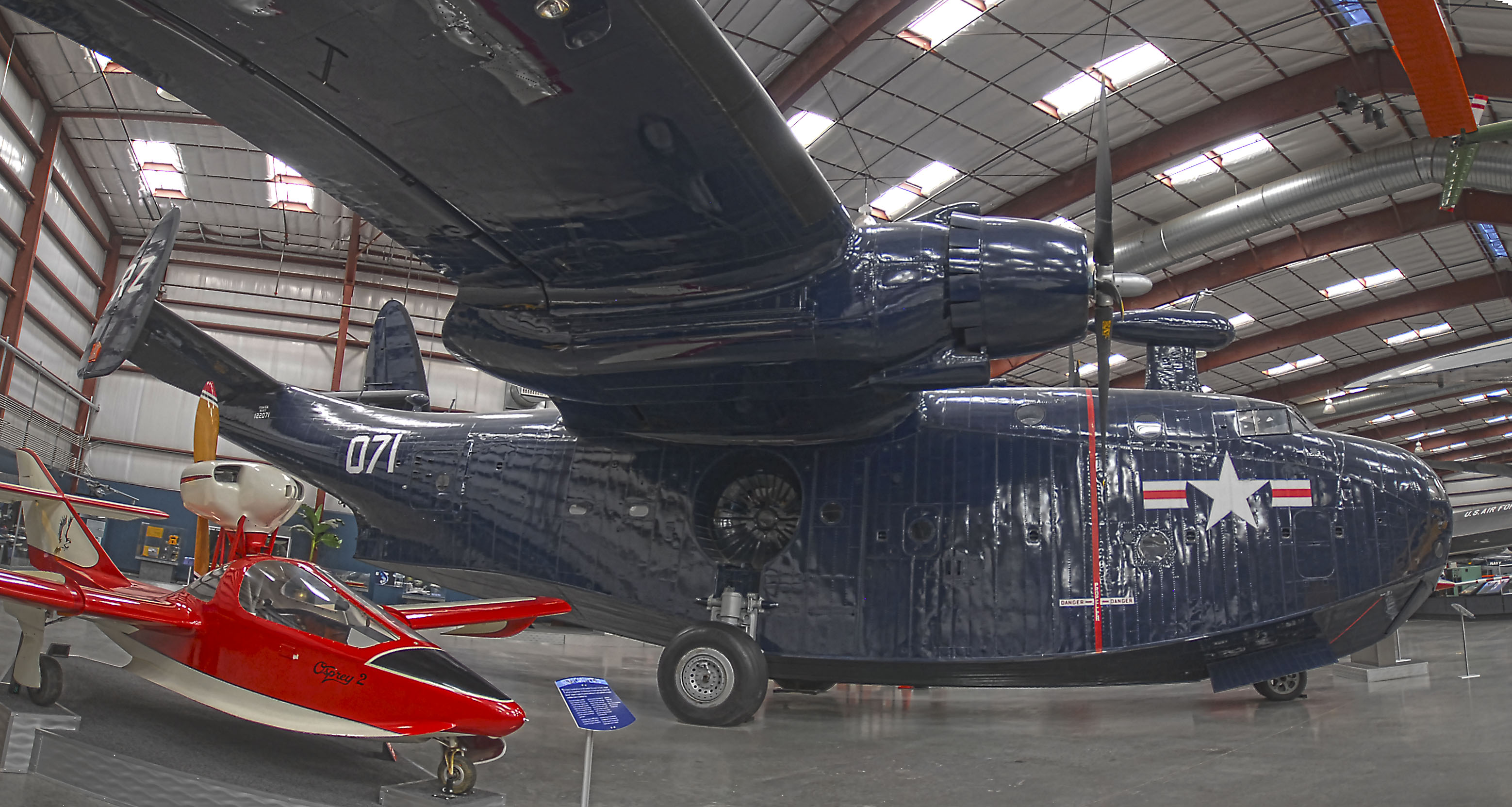
Martin PBM-5A Mariner amphibian preserved in transport squadron VR-21 markings. VR-21 provided civil air transport within the Navy-era TTPI with PBM-5As

=== Pre-TTAS ===
The TTPI was geographically coincident with the pre-World War II South Seas Mandate of the Empire of Japan. From 1934, the empire established a commercial airline system in the mandate with a hub at Palau. By 1941 this system provided flights to Yap, Tinian, Saipan, Truk, Pohnpei and Jaluit (mandate-era administrative center for the Marshall Islands), but Micronesians themselves made little use of these services. Prior to Interior taking responsibility for TTPI, the US Navy devoted five Martin PBM-5A amphibians from Air Transport Squadron VR-21 (see photo) and two Douglas R4-Ds (Navy version of the DC-3) to TTPI civilian air transport.. The PBM required JATO takeoffs at Yap.

=== Startup ===
In May 1949, President Truman ordered the transfer of responsibility for the TTPI from the US Navy to Interior within "two to three years." Interior and the Navy sent a commission to visit the islands and make recommendations for provision of post-Navy air and sea transport. Three Japan-era airfields in the TTPI had bomb damage and it was not considered worthwhile to rehabilitate them. The report recommended three different alternatives, the most expensive of which included Curtiss C-46 service for those islands with airfields. Instead, Interior opted for a less expensive ambhibious aircraft alternative.

=== Transocean era ===
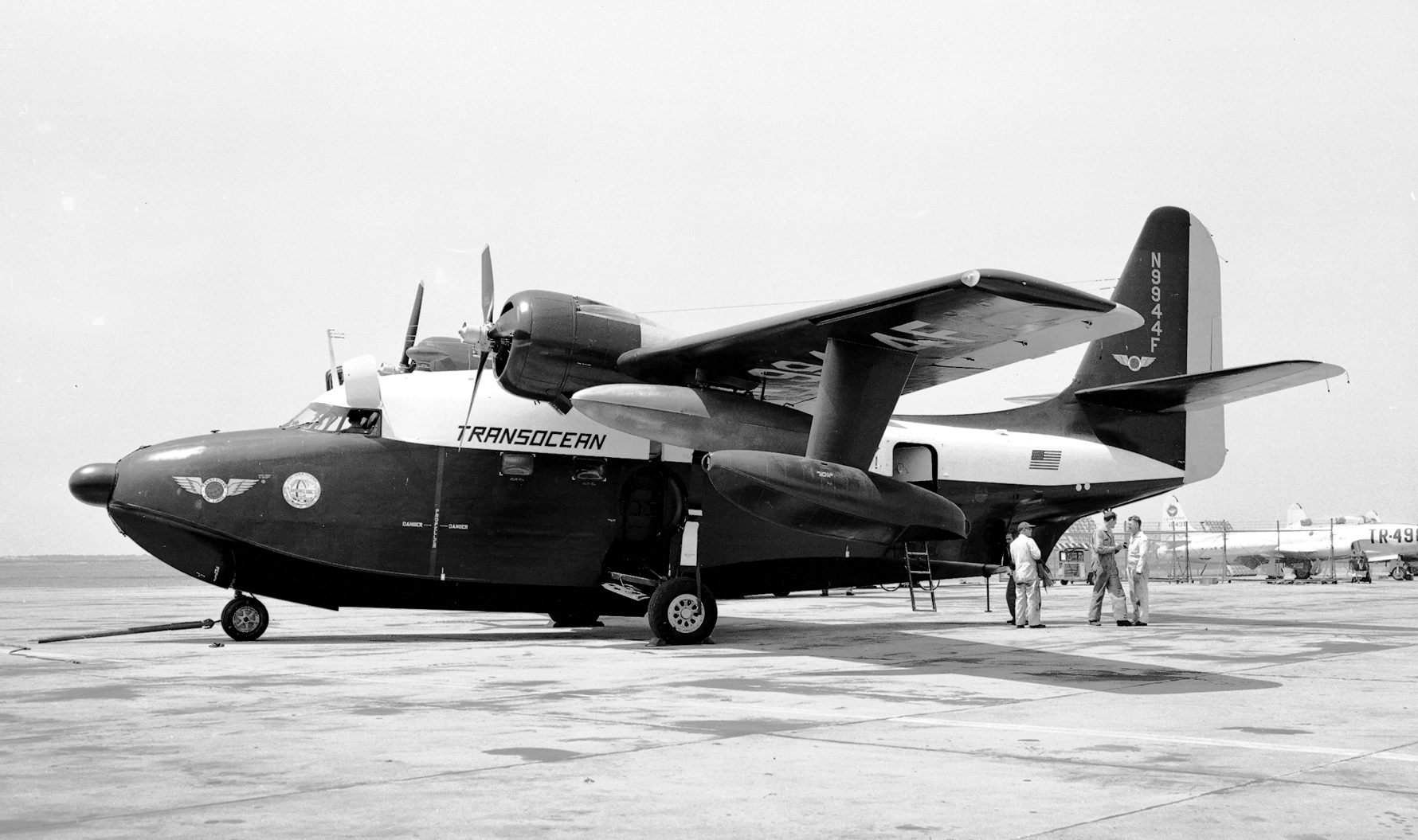
TTAS/Transocean SA-16, Oakland August 1954. The first TTAS SA-16 flew from Transocean's Oakland base via Hawaii to the TTPI that same month

Interior awarded Transocean the contract, out of a field of 12 bidders. Transocean originally contracted to fly PBY Catalinas but these were upgraded to Grumman SA-16s starting August 1954. Transocean lasted from 1951 (coincident with Interior taking over the Territory on July 1 from the Navy) until it got into financial trouble and, other than Trust Territory operations, ceased service in January 1960. The local part of Transocean providing Trust Territory operations became "divorced" from the parent, with the Territory, for instance, paying local Transocean employees directly. Transocean's contract expired June 1960 and the Territory sought a new operator; the initial bidder list included Central Intelligence Agency front Air America.

=== Pan Am era ===
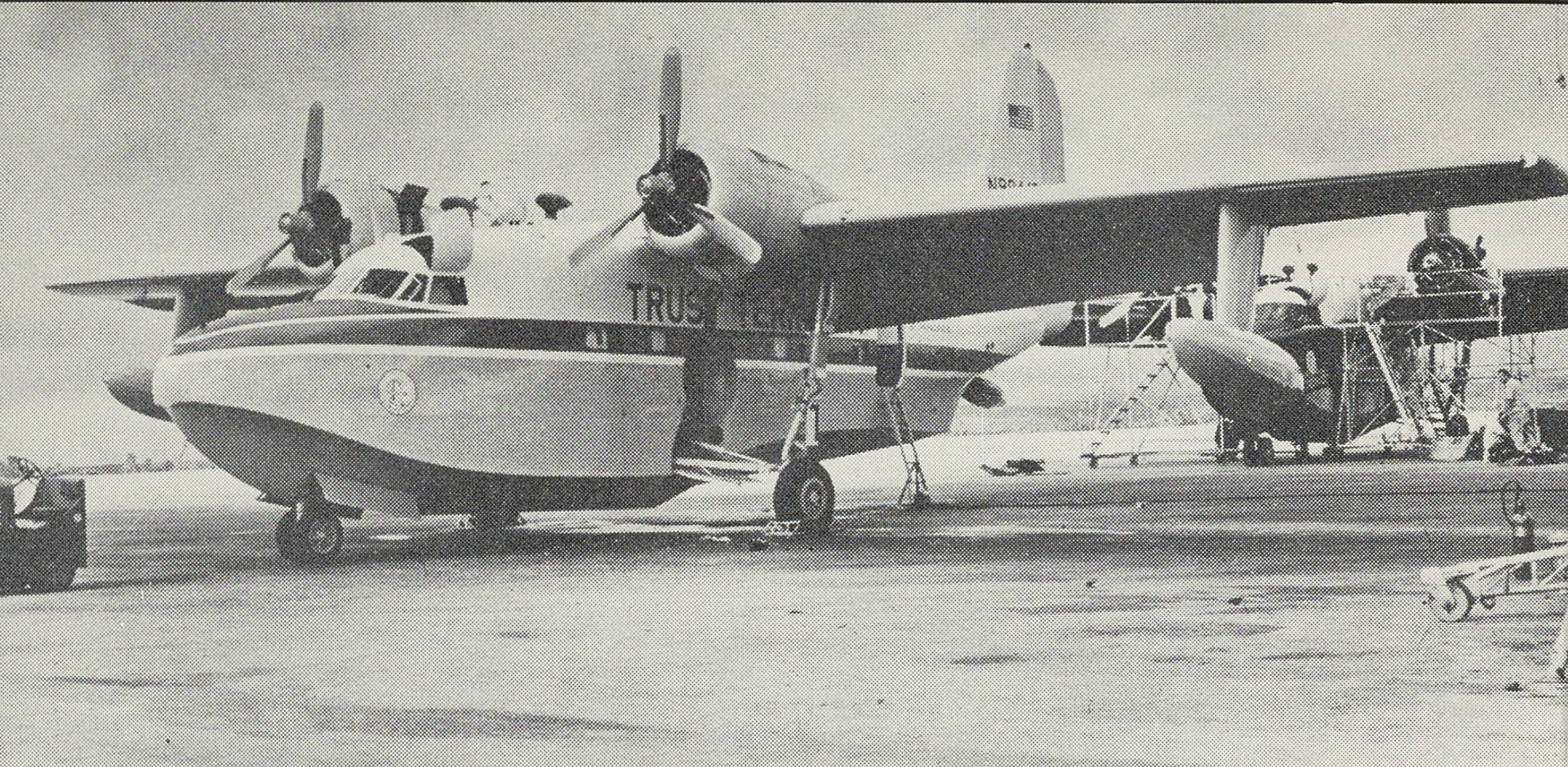
SA-16 1963, Pan Am era. See External links for a 1966 color photo of an SA-16

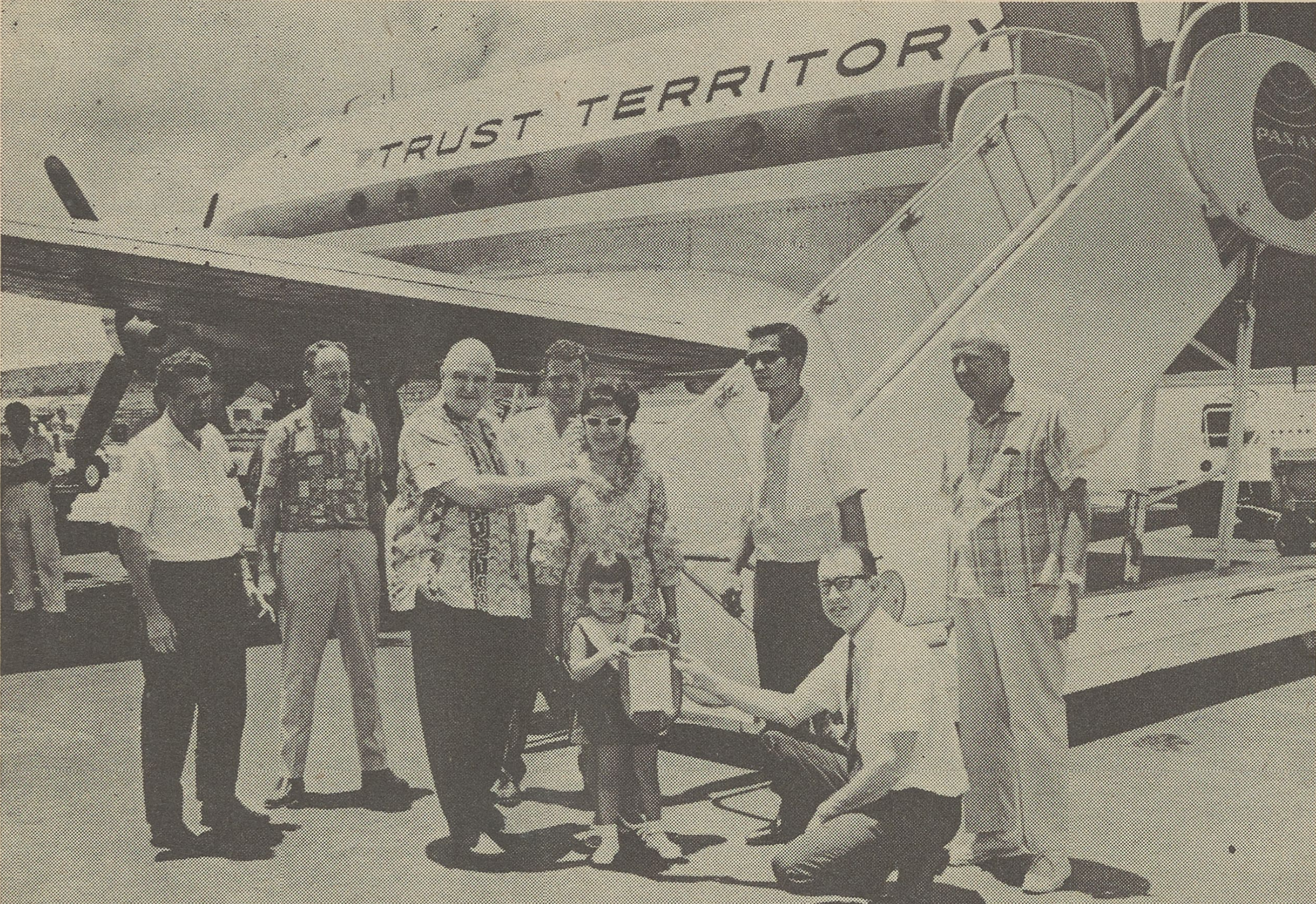
May 15, 1968, Guam: last passenger off the last flight of the Pan Am era (DC-4)

Pan American World Airways took over the TTAS contract, but was unable to start until September 1960; the former Transocean operation bridged the gap.In July 1962, TTAS added its first DC-4. Aircraft did not have a "Pan Am" livery but instead "Trust Territory" (see photo), with either the Trust Territory seal or flag on the tail (see photo above and External links for a color photo of a Trust Territory DC-4 with flag on the tail).

The TTPI owned the aircraft and provided almost all services other than flying the aircraft. Pan Am provided day-to-day maintenance, the TTPI paid for aircraft overhauls. TTPI also paid for Pan Am employee housing and subsistence. For fiscal year 1965, total revenue from TTAS flights was $323,000 (over $3.4 million in 2026 terms), but the Pan Am contract alone cost the TTPI $806,000. Aircraft utilization for both SA-16s and DC-4s was less than two hours a day. There was no other scheduled air service to the TTPI and the only place where TTAS intersected with external air service was Guam. TTAS did not, for instance, fly to Honolulu. Thus, a passenger wishing to go from Kwajalein to Honolulu (a distance of 2,448 miles) on a scheduled basis first flew to Guam (1,590 miles) and then Guam to Honolulu (3,789 miles), imposing a huge circuity burden. Other airlines regularly flew into the Territory, but they were military contract flights, such as Honolulu to Kwajalein, and thus not normally available to the public.

Pan Am employees referred to TTAS as a "non-scheduled scheduled airline" as a result of frequent service changes requested by the Territory; TTPI officials would occasionally bump paying customers. The SA-16s, which Pan Am employees called the "Clipper Duck," were a challenge to operate. They were sprayed with fresh water after every encounter with the ocean, but corrosion remained a problem. Pan Am sought out wrecked SA-16s, even submerged, to find parts. TTAS also provided emergency flights such as getting sick citizens to hospital, searching for missing boats, or assisting with typhoon evacuations.

In May 1968, Air Micronesia assumed TTPI air service role as part of a larger plan to change the approach to air service in the territory. For instance, Air Micronesia immediately started jet service, and the new network included Honolulu.

== Fleet ==
1 July 1951:

- 4 Consolidated PBY Catalina

Year-end 1954:

- 3 Grumman SA-16 Albatross

May 1968:

- 2 Grumman SA-16 Albatross
- 2 Douglas DC-4

== Destinations ==
1 September 1966:

- Guam
- Koror
- Kwajalein
- Majuro
- Pohnpei
- Rota
- Saipan
- Truk
- Yap

== See also ==
- Transocean Air Lines
- Pan American World Airways
- List of defunct airlines of the United States
- Trust Territory of the Pacific Islands
