= Baltai =

Festival of the Mordvin people

Baltai (Mordvin: Балта́й) is a traditional festival celebrated by the Mordvin people, predominantly in Tatarstan. The festival's name translates to Feast of Honey in the Tatar language, derived from the words bal meaning honey and tuy signifying a feast. Baltai is observed on the first Sunday following Whitsunday, marking the commencement of the mowing season. The festival is characterized by distinctive traditions, including the decoration of a bear with birch leaves and the performance of a round dance.

The Baltai festival serves as a significant cultural event among the Mordvin people, reflecting their deep-rooted traditions and customs. The festival's unique practices, such as the bear decoration and round dance, further highlight the Mordvin people's connection to nature and their cultural heritage.

== See also ==
- Sabantuy
- Çük

== Sources ==
- (in Russian) Национальный праздник | Новости администрации за июль 2002 года | Балаково в сети
