= Truck bed =

Truck bed may refer to:

- Tonneau, an open area of a vehicle, which may be coverable with a tonneau cover.
- Pickup bed, the bed of the tonneau of a pickup truck
- Flatbed truck truckbed
- Dump truck truckbed
- "Truck Bed" (song), a 2023 song by Hardy

== See also ==
- Truck (disambiguation)
- Bed (disambiguation)
