= Juren =

Former rank in Imperial China

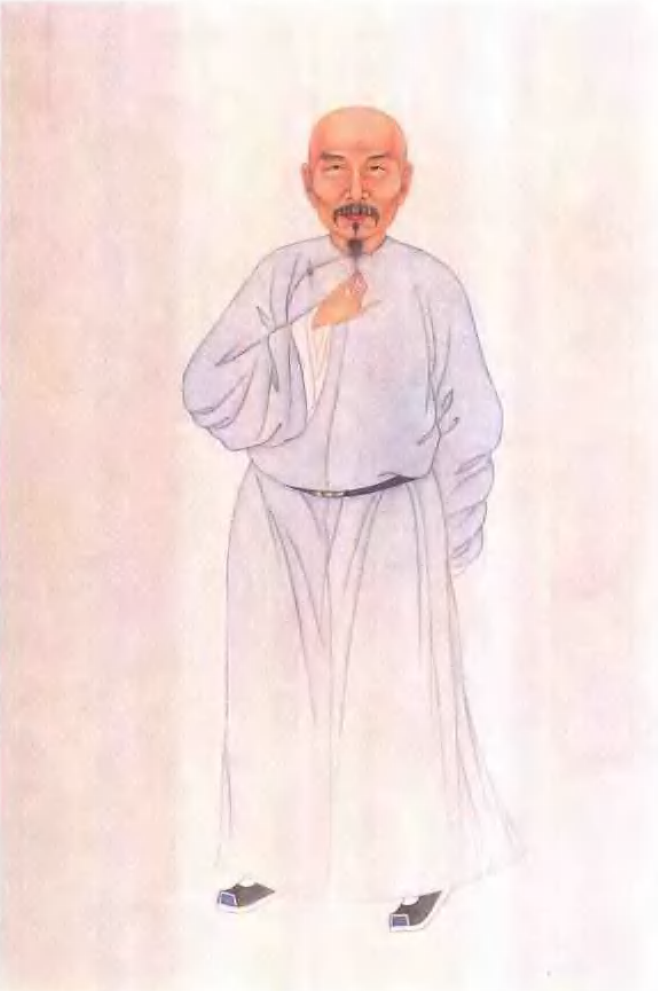
- Wei Yuan, a Qing dynasty juren scholar
- Traditional Chinese: 舉人
- Simplified Chinese: 举人
- Literal meaning: recommended man
Transcriptions
Standard Mandarin
- Hanyu Pinyin: jǔrén
- Wade–Giles: chü^{3}-jen^{2}
- IPA: [tɕỳɻə̌n]
Yue: Cantonese
- Yale Romanization: géoi-yàhn
- Jyutping: geoi^{2}-jan^{4}
- IPA: [kɵɥ˧˥ jɐn˩]

Juren (Chinese: 舉人; lit. 'recommended man') was a rank achieved by people who passed the xiangshi (Chinese: 鄉試) exam in the imperial examination system of imperial China. The xiangshi is also known, in English, as the provincial examination. It was a rank higher than the shengyuan rank, but lower than the jinshi rank, which was the highest degree.

To achieve the juren rank, candidates, who had to already hold the shengyuan rank, had to pass the provincial qualifying examination, held every three years in the provincial capital. A second, less widespread pathway to gaining the juren rank was through office purchase.

Those with the juren rank gained gentry status and experienced social, political and economic privileges accordingly.

The juren title was also awarded in the military examination system in imperial China.

== History ==
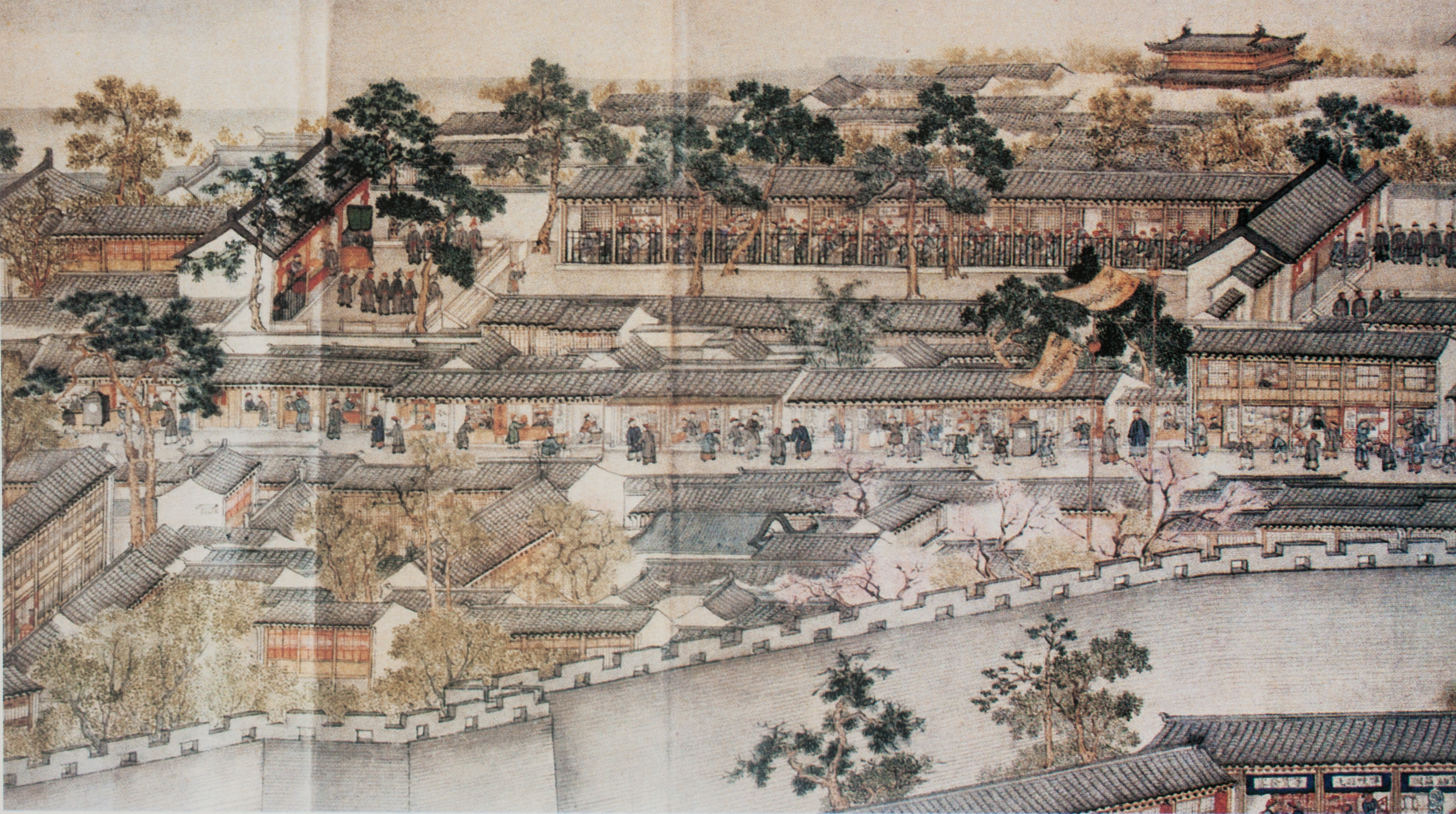
Civil examination hall in Qing dynasty.

The term juren was first used in the Han Dynasty to refer to individuals at the provincial level who were recommended for civil service. Those who were recommended for civil service were required to pass a central government examination before they were awarded an official title.

The civil service examination system was first officially established in the Sui dynasty. During the Sui, Tang, and Song dynasties, juren was used to refer to candidates of the state examination. During the Ming and Qing dynasties, the civil examination system matured and became well-established. During these later dynasties, juren was the title awarded to candidates who had successfully passed the provincial examinations. The awarding of the juren title ended with the abolition of the civil examinations in 1904.

== Appointment ==
During the Ming and Qing dynasties, there were two pathways to gaining the juren rank: one, through the civil examination system; the other, through office purchase.

=== Civil examination ===
The juren rank was awarded for candidates who passed the provincial level of the civil examination system in the Ming and Qing dynasties. The juren who came first in the examination process was awarded the title of jieyuan (Chinese: 解元). The qualifying exam was held in each provincial capital, once every three years. Candidates were required to take the examination in their registered province and sitting the examination in unregistered provinces was prohibited. This process was called the zhengtu (Chinese: 正途), or the regular path.

The provincial examinations, called xiangshi (Chinese: 鄉試), were written exams which occurred in three stages. Candidates were required to participate in all three stages of the examination. A quota system at the provincial level controlled the number of juren titles awarded. Obtaining the juren degree through the civil examination pathway was a difficult process, with competition notably increasing during the Ming dynasty. By 1630, there were approximately 49200 candidates from across China competing for 1279 juren degrees, with only 2.6% of candidates successfully obtaining the degree. From the period of 1800 to 1905, around 1500 men throughout China were awarded the juren degree after every provincial examination.

The examination was open to men from all socio-economic backgrounds, as long as they were holders of the shengyuan degree, which was the degree directly below the juren degree in China’s imperial civil examination system. There was no limit on a candidate’s age or on the number of times a candidate could sit the exam and candidates did not require a reference from officials to participate. However, women, Buddhist and Daoist clergy, and merchants were excluded from participating. It was only during the Ming dynasty when sons of merchants were first legally allowed to take any civil examination.

The provincial examination occurred in the fall of every third year. Shengyuan degree holders were required to travel to their respective provincial capitals to take three written examinations which were conducted over a week. An Imperial Commissioner, also known as the Grand Examiner, was sent to overlook the examinations from Beijing, the capital of China at the time.

The examination was governed by strict rules to ensure the process was fair. All essays were first transcribed in red ink before marking, to prevent examiners from identifying the candidates by their calligraphy and showing favourable treatment to particular candidates. As many as eight examiners would grade one candidate’s exam, whose name was concealed. Examiners would be removed from office if it was found that they had favoured a particular candidate during the grading of the exams. During the period that the Imperial Commissioner was in the province to overlook the examinations, his residence was guarded to prevent any candidates or friends or family of candidates from approaching him.

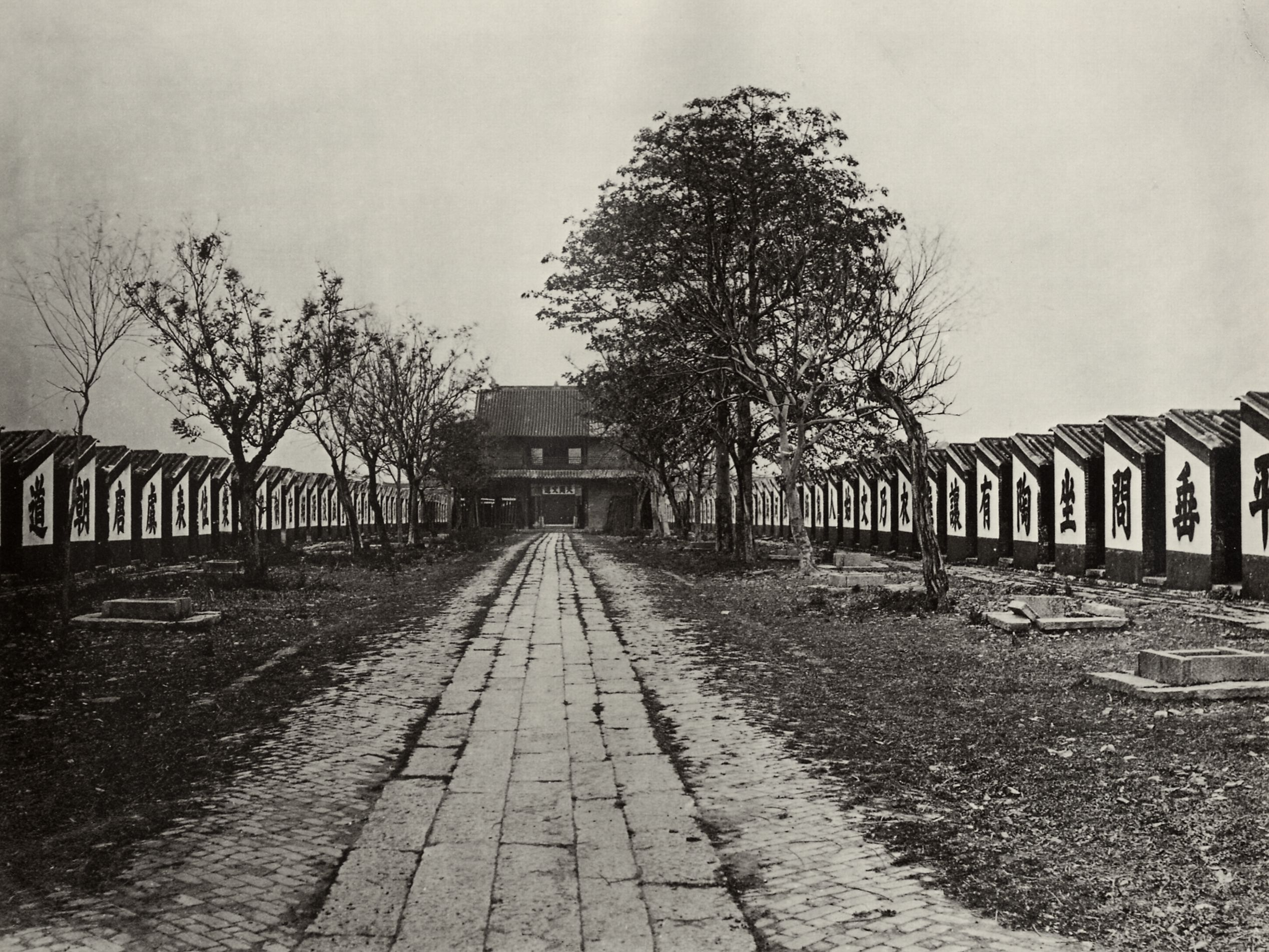
Chinese civil service examination hall with 7500 cells in Guangdong, 1873. These cells were designed to prevent cheating in exams.

The provincial examination took place over three sessions with each session of the exam being held on a separate day. Three days would pass between each day of examination. The examination process started early in the day, Candidates assembled by the gates of the examination hall and candidates were allowed in enter the hall once their name was called. Each candidate was given a roll of paper which identified the examination cell the candidate was to occupy in the exam. The examination hall was divided into long alleys lined with open cells, in which candidates took their exam. At one time, there could be up to ten or twelve thousand individuals in the same examination hall, from day to night.

==== Curriculum ====
Each of the three sessions of the provincial examination tested candidates on separate areas of the curriculum. During the Qing dynasty, the first session required candidates to answer three questions based on the Four Books and four questions on one of the Five Classics. The particular Classic on which the four questions were answered on was chosen by the candidate. In the second session, the candidate was required to write a discussion of the Classic of Filial Piety. Additionally, the candidate was required to compose five essays on writing verdicts and attempt any one of the following political forms of writing: an address to the emperor, an imperial declaration, or another form of imperial decree. In the third session, five essay questions on problems concerning the Five Classics, history and administrative affairs were to be answered.

In addition to the content of the exam, form was an examinable aspect of the candidate’s submission. During the Ming and Qing dynasties, all candidates’ essays were required to be composed in the form of eight-legged essays, which was a form of prose-writing involving strict enforcement of rigid parallel-prose styles. Candidates were rejected for writing in any structure which diverged from this standardised form.

Throughout the use of the civil examination system, there were minor changes to the provincial examination format and curriculum. In 1663, the imperial examination banned writing in the eight-legged essay form; however, the form was reintroduced in 1668. In 1687, the imperial declaration and decree were removed as possible political forms of writing for candidates in the second session. In 1758, the first session was changed to include a question on Song dynasty Neo-Confucian rationalist books. In 1767, the first session was changed to consist of only three questions on the Four Books while the discussion on the Five Classics was moved to the second session. Writing verdicts and addresses to the emperor were also abolished. Instead, a poetry question was introduced. In 1782, the question on poetry was moved to the first session and the question on Song Neo-Confucian rationalism was moved to the second session. In 1787, the candidate’s option of choosing any one of the Five Classics to discuss in the exam was changed so that a particular book from the Five Classics was set for candidates to compulsorily answer. In the same year, the question on Neo-Confucian rationalism was removed from the syllabus. By 1793, candidates were expected to write essays on all Five Classics. After 1793, the syllabus of the provincial examination remained fixed.

=== Office purchase ===
The second pathway to obtaining the juren degree was through office purchase. Obtaining degrees through office purchase was known as the yitu (Chinese: 異途), or the irregular path to gaining a degree. Office purchase, known as juanna (Chinese: 捐纳), was the practice of obtaining degrees and offices through purchase, instead of through successfully passing the civil examinations. The practice was formally introduced in the Ming dynasty and continued to exist through the Qing dynasty as a common practice. This was a legal process and was overseen by the government.

During the Qing dynasty, men could become officials by making a payment in silver to the government. Through office purchase, men did not need to meet any eligibility requirements to be appointed the juren rank. Those who obtained the juren degree through office purchase enjoyed the same benefits, privileges and opportunity for career advancement as those who obtained the degree through the civil examinations. Men could register for the prefecture-level entrance examination and then purchase the juren degree. It was also common for juren degree-holders to use office purchase to further their careers.

== Responsibilities and privileges ==
Obtaining the juren rank enabled degree-holders to obtain official positions. In the Tang dynasty, only jinshi degree-holders were eligible for official positions. However, in the Ming and Qing dynasties, passing the provincial examination and obtaining the juren degree entitled the degree-holder to obtain a lower-level government official role.^{[2]} In the early- and mid-Ming dynasty, juren served as prefecture, county, and department education officials. This entitled them to act as provincial examination officials. Juren who had failed to obtain the jinshi degree were immediately eligible to become education officials and act as directors and subdirectors of prefectural and county schools. In the late-Ming dynasty, juren were placed in posts of county magistrates, as well as directors and subdirectors of schools. Those who were appointed magistrate were responsible for collecting taxes from the residents of their county. Additionally, magistrates were responsible for maintaining law, order, and the moral and ethical standards in the areas under their control. However, by the end of the Ming dynasty and into the Qing dynasty, jinshi degree-holders had begun to displace juren degree-holders in high-level official positions.

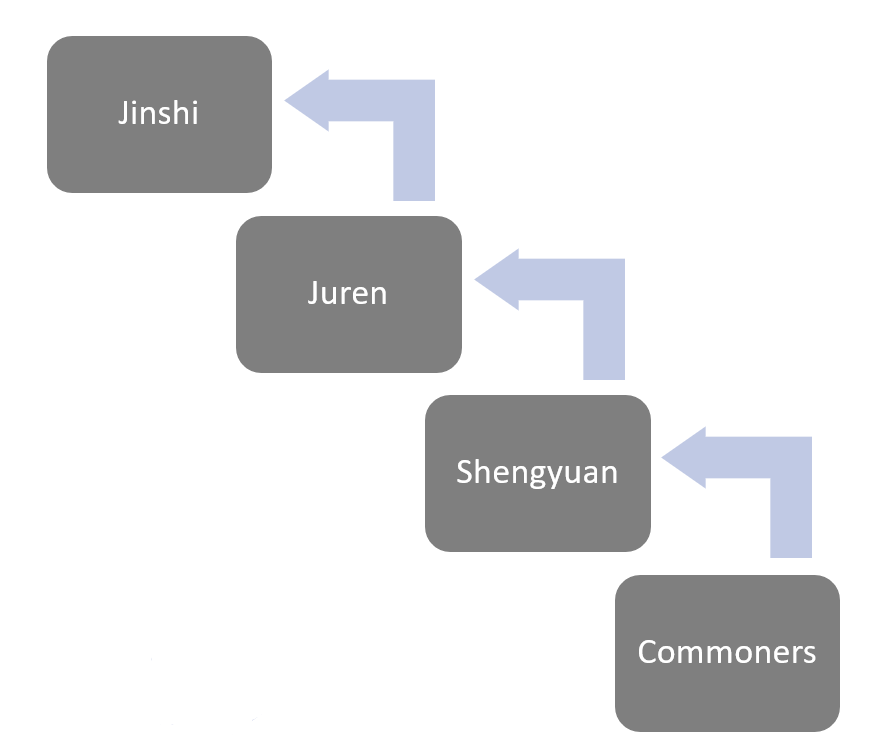
The hierarchy of China's civil examination system.

The juren rank brought degree-holders and their families such substantial privileges that it was not uncommon for families to pool their resources to support promising individuals from poor families during the examination process. Only those awarded with the juren degree had the opportunity to obtain the highest degree of the civil examination system, the jinshi degree, through the national examination. In the Qing dynasty, it became a requirement for candidates of the jinshi rank to have a father who had passed the provincial examination and had acquired at least a juren rank. An additional benefit of the juren degree was that the title was awarded for life, unlike the lower prefectural shengyuan degree. The juren degree could not be inherited.

Aside from the possibility of gaining higher official roles, juren also gained a higher social status. In imperial China, examinations and merit were strongly associated with social status, wealth, prestige, and political power. This is reflected in how juren were distinctly addressed as laoye ("your honour") by commoners. Gaining the juren rank brought the degree-holder social privileges such as improved prospects for good marriages. Additionally, juren gave their family the ability to gain or maintain their elite status. For example, juren degree-holders were eligible to erect flagpoles with red and gold silk flags at their residences to announce their achievements. Their families were referred to as "flagpole families", which was an honour and symbolised the higher social status of the family.

The legal privileges experienced by juren include exemption from labour services required of all commoners except civil examination degree-holders. They were also exempt from normal penal codes and corporal punishment, and could not be arrested without special imperial order. Juren households also had economic privileges in the local community, such as a guaranteed minimum level of employment and pay, as well as tax reductions and exemptions.

Other privileges of the juren rank included the right of having different clothing, carriages, guards, servants, and funeral and grave ceremonies than commoners. For example, degree-holders were entitled to wear a scholar's robe.

== Other usage ==
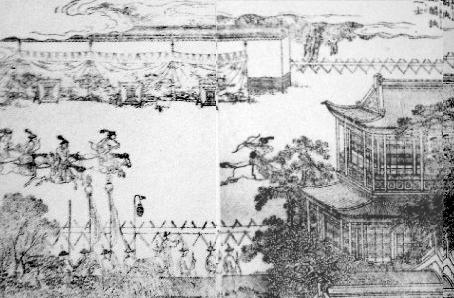
Military examination in Qing dynasty, China. Examinees are being tested on mounted archery.

=== Military ===
During Wu Zetian's reign, a military examination system was introduced, which continued until the Qing dynasty. The military examinations were modelled on the civil examination system, held once every three years, with successful candidates being awarded the title of military juren, or wu juren (Chinese: 武舉人). Military examinations involved various physical tests, such as ability in archery, equestrianism, and handling polearms. Aside from the need for candidates to satisfactorily demonstrate their physical abilities, the military exams had written components that required candidates to master military or classic texts, such as Sun Tzu's The Art of War. Only individuals with the wu juren title could participate in the metropolitan military exam, with successful candidates of this exam being awarded the military jinshi, or wu jinshi (Chinese: 武進士) title.

== Notable people ==
Notable people who achieved juren as their highest degree include:

- Tang Yin, poet
- Shen Defu
- Qi Jiguang, general
- Yang Shoujing
- Wu Sangui, general
- Wei Yuan, scholar and secretariat
- Zuo Zongtang, general
- Lin Changyi, scholar and poet
- Liang Qichao, scholar and politician
- Wu Zhihui, anarchist writer and Republic of China official
- Lin Shu, Chinese scholar, writer, and translator, active during the late Qing dynasty
- Huang Zunxian, Chinese official, scholar, and writer, active during the late Qing dynasty
- Wong Nai Siong, Chinese revolutionary leader, scholar, and educator
- Zheng Xiaoxu, scholar and politician
- Jiang Guhuai, politician and collaborator with Japan
- Liang Hongzhi, politician and collaborator with Japan
- Zhu Xingyuan, politician and collaborator with Japan
- Yan Zong, military leader, magistrate and Ming dynasty painter
