= Chuk =

Chuk may refer to:

- Chuk (instrument), the traditional Korean musical instrument
- CHUK, the Conserved helix-loop-helix ubiquitous kinase (also known as IKKα or IKK1)
- Chuk, Iran, a village in Kurdistan Province, Iran
- Çük (also spelled Chuk or Chuek), the Idel-Ural festival
- Chuk, an alternative romanization of cheok, a unit of length in Korean units of measurement
- Chuk, alternative transliteration of jook (congee)* Cantonese surname of Zhù (surname) 祝

== See also ==
- Chok (disambiguation)
