= Lin Changyi =

19th-century Chinese scholar and poet

- Chinese: 林昌彝
Transcriptions
Standard Mandarin
- Hanyu Pinyin: Lín Chāngyí
- Wade–Giles: Lin^{2} Chʻang^{1}-i^{2}

Lin Changyi (Chinese: 林昌彝; 1803–1876) was a Chinese scholar. He published several collections of poems, many of which criticised the British. Lin was particularly vocal about the opium trade and Christian missionary activity in China.

== Early life ==
Lin was born in 1803 in Houguan, Fuzhou, Fujian. His father was a merchant. Lin was tutored by Chen Shouqi (陳壽祺), who allowed him access to his personal library which comprised over eighty thousand juan or volumes of works. Lin became a juren in 1839, but failed to pass the more advanced metropolitan examinations even after eight attempts.

== Career ==
Lin felt personally aggrieved by the gradual decline of the Qing dynasty. Following the signing of the Treaty of Nanking in 1842, which ended the First Opium War, he became more interested in the subject of foreign activity in China, especially in his native Fuzhou, which was one of the five ports that imported foreign goods.

An anthology of poems that Lin had written before and during the Opium War, titled Shèyīng lóu shīhuà (射鹰楼诗话, literally A commentary on poems from the Eagle Shooting Pavilion), was first published in 1851. Lin was "most offended" by the opium trade in China, as well as the Christian missions in China, and he elaborated on the title of his work:

There is a pavilion to the northeast of my study. It faces the Jicui Temple on the Black Rock Hill that is now the hiding-place of a block of hungry eagles. They have built their eyries there and have resided in them ever since. Whenever I rest my eyes upon the spot, the sight of it disgusts and embitters me. My first impulse is to snatch my strong bow, and shoot a deadly arrow at them. But, alas! My dart would not be fatal, and I relinquish my purpose in despair! To console myself I have sketched a painting to which I have given the name Shoot the Eagles and Hunt the Wolves. Hence I named my study the Eagle Shooting Pavilion.

An interpreter for the British consul in Fuzhou, Charles A. Sinclair, further noted that the word for "eagle" in Chinese (鹰; yīng) and part of the Chinese translation of "England" (英; yīng) were homophones.

In 1853, Lin was awarded a teaching position in Jianning, after impressing the Xianfeng Emperor with his writings. However, Lin quickly resigned after witnessing "malpractices within official circles". In the next two decades, he lectured at the Haimen Academy in Lianzhou, Guangdong. In 1863, he published Yīyǐnshānfáng shījí (衣讔山房詩集, literally A poetry anthology from the Yiyinshanfang Studio). The poems in the collection, which were written during his time in Guangdong, revolve around the British presence in China, corruption in the government, inflation, and the Taiping Rebellion.

Lin had also written an essay on coastal defence in 1833, but only submitted it to the Xianfeng Emperor two decades later, following several revisions. Two more poetry anthologies, Hǎitiān qínsī lù (海天琴思錄, literally A poetry commentary from the lute-playing pleasure-boat) and its sequel Hǎitiān qínsī xùlù (海天琴思續錄), were published in 1864 and 1869 respectively. In his later poems, Lin continued to express anti-British sentiments, but also remarked positively about Western inventions such as the steam locomotive. His 1866 treatise, Yànguì xùlù (砚桂绪录), covered a range of topics from astronomy to medicine to technology.

== Views ==
=== Christianity ===
Lin was highly critical of Christianity. He believed that Christian missionaries in China were targeting "stupid and ignorant people" with tracts "composed in the most extravagantly foolish style". He was especially opposed to the negative sentiment that Christians had towards ancestor veneration in China: "What person with any human decency would relinquish the worship of his ancestors?"

Lin opined that the Ten Commandments "ridiculed" the writings of Confucius and Mencius. He also likened the reported miracles of Jesus to Daoist magic:

If we look at his whole life, then the most remarkable things were his healings. Now harming the flesh is sorcery. He once broke seven loaves to feed three thousand disciples, which is no more than the transporting arts of the Daoists. He had no other acts of merit, and he dares to call himself the Lord who created heaven and earth, and falsely claim that heaven, earth, people, and all sentient beings were made by him!

=== Opium ===
Lin emphasised the economic ruin that the trade of opium had brought to China. He wrote that the British were "barbarians" who would incur the "wrath of Heaven and the universal rage of mankind". The irony of the ban of opium in England was not lost on Lin: "Does not so much deliberate barbarity and cruelty bill one with feelings of injustice and lawful anger?"

== Bibliography ==
- Chen, Jianming (2008). "Modern Chinese Attitudes Towards the Bible". In Starr, Chloe (ed.). Reading Christian Scriptures in China. Bloomsbury Academic. pp. 13–31. ISBN 9780567032928.
- Ng, Chin-keong (2017). Boundaries and Beyond: China's Maritime Southeast in Late Imperial Times. NUS Press. ISBN 9789814722445.
- Pierre-Étienne, Will (2020). Handbooks and Anthologies for Officials in Imperial China. Brill. ISBN 9789004416208.
