= Çük =

Çük (Çuq; Tatar pronunciation: [ɕyk] or [ɕuq]; Cyrillic: Чук, Чүк, Чӳк, Чӱк) was a holiday of Keräşen Tatars, Chuvashes, Udmurts, preserved before the beginning of 20th century. It was celebrated as summer, before the Whitsunday or at the Poqraw eve (The Intercession). Commoners arranged a collective meal, and called for rain. Recent years Çük is celebrated in several districts of Tatarstan and is held in the manner of Sabantuy, in Chuvash чӳке(н) - rinse.

== See also ==
- Sabantuy
- Baltai

== Sources ==
- "Çük/Чүк". Tatar Encyclopaedia (in Tatar). Kazan: The Republic of Tatarstan Academy of Sciences. Institution of the Tatar Encyclopaedia. 2002.
- (in Russian) Chuvash Çük and other Chuvash holidays
