= Zhu Xingyuan =

Chinese politician (1880–?)

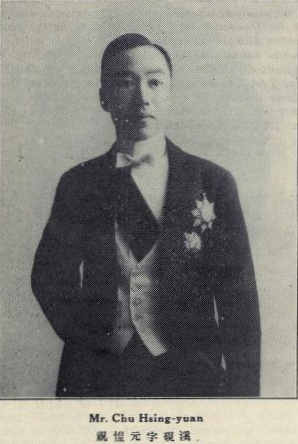
Zhu Xingyuan

Zhu Xinyuan (Chinese: 祝惺元; pinyin: Zhù Xīngyuán; Wade–Giles: Chu Hsing-yüan; born 1880) was a politician and diplomat in the Republic of China. He was an important politician during the Provisional Government of the Republic of China and the Wang Jingwei regime. His courtesy name was Yanxi (硯溪). He was born in Daxing, Zhili (now Beijing).

== Biography ==
Zhu Xingyuan was a graduate of the Peking Imperial University with the degree of Juren. After his graduation, he went to Japan where he studied for 2 years in the Chuo University.

In August 1912 Zhu Xingyuan was appointed junior secretary of the Ministry for Foreign Affairs. In next September, he was promoted to be senior secretary of the same Ministry. In December he was appointed First Secretary to the Chinese Legation at Washington D.C. In July 1918 he was again appointed secretary of the Ministry for Foreign Affairs and to act concurrently as Councilor of the Ministry. In August 1919 he was appointed a member of the commission to supervise the Examination for Diplomatic and Consular Officials. In the same month he was appointed Secretary to the Ministry for Communications. In October 1920 he was appointed Commissioner of Foreign Affairs for Zhili. He held this position until December 1924.

In National Government Zhu Xingyuan was appointed a member of the Beiping (Peking) City Government. In 1930 he was appointed Chief of the Section for Asian Affairs of the Bureau for Foreign Affairs, the General Headquarters for Army, Navy and Air Force. In next December he was transferred to Councilor of the Ministry for Foreign Affairs. Later he successively held the positions of Adviser of the same Ministry and member of the Beiping City Government.

After the Second Sino-Japanese War broke out, Zhu Xingyuan participated to the Provisional Government of the Republic of China where he was appointed Chief of the Bureau for Social Affairs of the Tianjin Special City. After establishing the Wang Jingwei regime, in May 1940 he was appointed to Chief of the Bureau for Foreign Affairs of the Agency for Political Affairs, the North China Political Council (華北政務委員會). In July he was promoted to be Chief of the Agency of Political Affairs. In March 1942 he resigned his post, and was transferred to a member of the North China Political Council.

After that, the whereabouts of Zhu Xingyuan were unknown.

== Alma mater ==
Peking University
Chuo University

== Awards and decorations ==
Order of Wen-Hu

== Sources ==
- Who's Who in China 3rd ed. (中國名人錄 第三版). The China Weekly Review (Shanghai) (上海密勒氏評論報). 1925.
- Xu Youchun (徐友春) (main ed.) (2007). Unabridged Biographical Dictionary of the Republic, Revised and Enlarged Version (民国人物大辞典 增订版). Hebei People's Press (Hebei Renmin Chubanshe; 河北人民出版社). ISBN 978-7-202-03014-1.
- Liu Shoulin (刘寿林) (etc.ed.) (1995). The Chronological Table of the Republic's Officer (民国职官年表). Zhonghua Book Company. ISBN 7-101-01320-1.
