= Chuuk =

Chuuk or Truk may refer to:

== Places ==
- Chuuk State (Truk State), one of the four states of the Federated States of Micronesia
- Chuuk Lagoon (Truk Lagoon), or Chuuk Atoll (Truk Atoll), a sheltered body of water and island group in the central Pacific, in Chuuk State, Micronesia
- Chuuk International Airport, an airport located on Weno, in Chuuk State, Micronesia
- Chuuk High School (Truk High School), Weno, Chuuk Lagoon, Chuuk State, Federated States of Micronesia
- Naval Base Truk, Truk Lagoon, Truk Atoll, Truk State

== People ==
- Chuukese people (Truk people), an ethnic group in Micronesia, Oceania
- Le Truk (1983–2019; Russian: Кири́лл Алекса́ндрович Толмацкий, romanized: Kirill Aleksandrovich Tolmatsky), a Russian rapper hiphop artist

== Other uses ==
- Chuukese language (Truk language), a language of the Austronesian language family
- Battle of Truk, a massive United States Navy air and surface attack on Truk Lagoon on 17–18 February 1944

== See also ==
- Chuck (disambiguation)
- Chuk (disambiguation)
- CHUC
- Chuq (disambiguation)
- Truck (disambiguation)
- Truc
- Truque
