= Zhu Linfang =

Chinese Taekwondo practitioner

Colonel Zhu Linfang
Personal information
- Born: September 25, 1982 (age 43) Henan, China
- Education: PLA Military Sports Institute (MS, 2008); Wuhan Sports University (BS, 2004)
- Occupation(s): Taekwondo Athlete, Taekwondo Referee, Military Officer
- Years active: 1998 - 2005

Zhu Linfang (Chinese: 祝林芳; pinyin: Zhu Lin Fang; born September 25, 1982, in Henan, China), is an international referee for World Taekwondo, a former taekwondo athlete and world military champion.

Zhu Linfang claimed her first title in the First College Taekwondo Classic of China in 1998, the very first tournament in her taekwondo career. In May 1999, she won another title in the National Taekwondo Championships of China in the Women's under 51 kg competition. Zhu missed the Sydney Olympic Games in 2000 because of an injury to her ankle ligament. However, in 2000–2004, she successively achieved world champion four times, and three times was awarded “Female Best Player” in the World Military Taekwondo Championships.

After retiring from her athletic career, Zhu Linfang started her current job as a college teacher in China since 2008 and as an international referee since 2009. As one of a few active international referees from China, Zhu has refereed in a series of international tournaments, including the World Taekwondo Championships (2015 Chelyabinsk), World Taekwondo Grand Prix (2014 Manchester, 2015 Samsun and 2016 Suzhou), the World Cadet Taekwondo Championships (2015 Muju), the World Junior Taekwondo Championships (2016 Burnaby), the Military World Games (2015 Mungyeong), the Military Taekwondo Championships (2014 Tehran), 2011 Summer Universiade (Shenzhen), the World University Taekwondo Championship (2010 Vigo, 2014 Hohhot), East Asian Games (2013 Tianjin), the Korea Open International Taekwondo Championships (2015 Chuncheon and 2016 Gyeongju) and the U.S. Open Taekwondo Championships (2016 Reno), etc.

Zhu Linfang became a public figure in China since she devoted herself to the promotion of junior taekwondo in China. She coaches junior taekwondo clubs in Guangzhou, China and was recently served as an invited judge for the Guangzhou Junior Talents Competition held by IFENG.COM.

== Achievements ==
=== World Military Championships ===
- 2000 Seoul, 51 kg
- 2001 Woensdrecht, 51 kg
- 2003 Zagreb, 55 kg
- 2004 Warendorf, 55 kg

=== National Championships ===
- 1999 Zhengzhou, 51 kg
- 2000 Zhaoqing, 51 kg
- The Ninth National Games of the People's Republic of China, 2001 Shenzhen, 49 kg
