= Zhu Xuejun =

Chinese scientist

- 祝学军
- Born: December 1962 (age 63); Shenyang, Liaoning, China
- Education: No.1 Research Institute of the Ministry of Space Industry
- Scientific career
- Fields: Missile; Hypersonic vehicle
- Workplaces: No.1 Research Institute of China Aerospace Group Co., Ltd

Chinese name
- Traditional Chinese: 祝學軍
- Simplified Chinese: 祝学军
Transcriptions
Standard Mandarin
- Hanyu Pinyin: Zhù Xuéjūn

Zhu Xuejun (Chinese: 祝学军; born December 1962) is a Chinese missile scientist. She is a member of the Chinese Communist Party.

== Education ==
Zhu was born in Shenyang, Liaoning in December 1962. She graduated from No.1 Research Institute of the Ministry of Space Industry.

== Career ==
After graduation, she worked there. She was a delegate to the 11th and 12th National People's Congress. She is a member of the 13th National Committee of the Chinese People's Political Consultative Conference.

== Contribution ==
She was the chief designer of the DF-17, a solid-fuelled road-mobile Short-range ballistic missile that mounts the DF-ZF Hypersonic Glide Vehicle.

== Honors and awards ==
- November 22, 2019 Member of the Chinese Academy of Sciences (CAS)
