= Truck (disambiguation) =

A truck is a road vehicle used for carrying freight.

Truck or trucks may also refer to:

== Arts, entertainment, media ==
=== Film & television ===
- The Truck, a 1980 Bulgarian film
- Trucks (film), a 1997 TV film based on the Stephen King story
- Trucks!, a television program
- "Trucks", an episode from the 2022 American television Cars on the Road

=== Literature ===
- "Trucks" (short story), a 1973 short story by Stephen King
- Truck, a children's picture book by Donald Crews
- Trucks!, the title of a children's story from the Railway Series book The Little Old Engine by the Reverend Wilbert Awdry

=== Music ===
- Truck (Singaporean band), a Singaporean psychedelic rock trio
- Truck (Canadian band), a Canadian rock group active during the 1960s and 1970s
  - Truck (Truck album), 1973
- Truck Festival, a British music festival
  - Truck Records, a record label associated with the festival
- Truck (Jett Rebel album), 2016
- Trucks (band), a British pop-punk band
- "Truck", a song by Hardy from his 2020 album A Rock
- "TRUCKS", a song from the 2022 American television series Cars on the Road and used in the episode of the same name
- The Trucks, 2006 album by a band of the same name

== People ==
- Truck Hannah (1889–1982), Major League Baseball catcher
- Truck Parham (1911–2002), American jazz double-bassist
- Truck Robinson (born 1951), retired National Basketball Association power forward
- Fred Truck, American artist
- Butch Trucks (1947–2017), American drummer and a founding member of The Allman Brothers Band
- Derek Trucks (born 1979), American guitarist, songwriter, founder of The Derek Trucks Band and member of The Allman Brothers Band; nephew of Butch Trucks
- Toni Trucks (born 1980), American actress
- Virgil Trucks (1917–2013), Major League Baseball pitcher and coach

== Transportation ==
=== Vehicles ===
- Pickup truck, a type of light and medium duty truck with an open bed
- Goods wagons or open wagons, sometimes called "trucks" in British English
- Forklift truck
- Hand truck, also a sack truck in the United Kingdom, a form of wheeled dolly

=== Parts ===
- Bogies, called "trucks" in North American railroading
- Skateboard truck, the axle assemblies of a skateboard
- Truck (rigging), a wooden ball, disk, or bun-shaped cap at the top of a mast

== Other uses ==
- Trucks or trucco, a lawn game
- Truck system, in which employees are paid with credit that can only be redeemed from the employers' goods or store

== See also ==
- "Truckin'", a 1970 Grateful Dead song
- Chuuk (disambiguation), several entities in Micronesia, also spelled Truk
- Truk (disambiguation)
- Truc
- Truque
