= Sabantuy =

Summer festival of certain Turkic people

Sabantuy is a Tatar, Idel-Uralian, Bashkir and Kazakh ('Sabantoy') summer festival, that dates back to the Volga Bulgarian epoch. At first Sabantuy was a festival of farmers in rural areas, but it later became a national holiday and now is widely celebrated in the cities. In 2012, Kazan Sabantuy was celebrated on June 23.

== Nomenclature ==
Tatar-speakers call the holiday Sabantuy (Сабантуй, [sʌbɑnˈtuɪ]), or, more correctly, Saban tuyı (Сабан туе, [sʌˈbɑn tuˈjɯ]) – plural form: Sabantuylar [sʌbɑntuɪˈlɑr].

Other Turkic peoples living along the Volga also celebrate the holiday. Bashkir-speakers call it Habantuy (Һабантуй), Chuvash-speakers — Akatuy (Акатуй).

The holiday's name means "plough's feast" in Turkic languages. The synonym "plough's holiday", or Saban bäyräme (Сабан бәйрәме [sʌˈbɑn bæɪræˈme]) also occurs.

== History ==
Sabantuy traces its origins to the pre-Islamic epoch, when it was celebrated before the sowing season. The presence of Sabantuy was noticed by ibn Fadlan as early as in 921. Traditional songs and other customs of the Sabantuy probably had a religious connotation at that time.

Later, with the spread of Islam among Tatars and Bashkirs and Christianity among Chuvashs, it became a secular holiday. In each region, villages took turns to celebrate the holiday.

In the beginning of the 20th century Sabantuy gained recognition as the national festival of the Tatars. The Soviet authorities approved of this festival probably due to its humble rural origin. However, they moved Sabantuy to the after-sowing season, thus merging it with the ancient summer festival Cıyın (Cyrillic: Җыен, [ʑɯɪˈɯn]).

Recently, Moscow announced plans to nominate Sabantuy for the inclusion into the Masterpieces of the Oral and Intangible Heritage of Humanity list in 2007.

In the United States, Sabantuy, the Tatar national holiday, has received official recognition at the state and local levels. On June 6, 2025, Bob Ferguson, Governor of Washington State, issued a proclamation celebrating Sabantuy. This was followed on June 8, 2025, by a similar proclamation from the City of Kirkland in Washington State, further highlighting the growing cultural recognition of the Tatar community and their traditions within the USA.

== Traditions ==
The main distinctive elements of Sabantuy include the traditional sporting competitions such as köräş (Tatar wrestling), horse racing, race-in-sack, pillar-climbing, egg-in-spoon-in-mouth-racing, sacks-battle on the crossbar, pot smashing, finding a coin in a qatıq (a beverage made from sour milk), and other contests. Such activities take place on the mäydan, which would usually be located at the edge of a forest.

A tradition, called sörän, was held to collect a fare for guests of the festival and prizes for the winners of the contests. Qarğa botqası (Rook's porridge), a ritual porridge, was cooked before the Sabantuy to treat children in the village. Another tradition was praying at the cemetery.

In the recent years Sabantuy is also often combined with the folk and pop music festivals, as well as accordion music festivals, named Play, accordion! (Uyna, ğarmun!).

=== Kurash ===
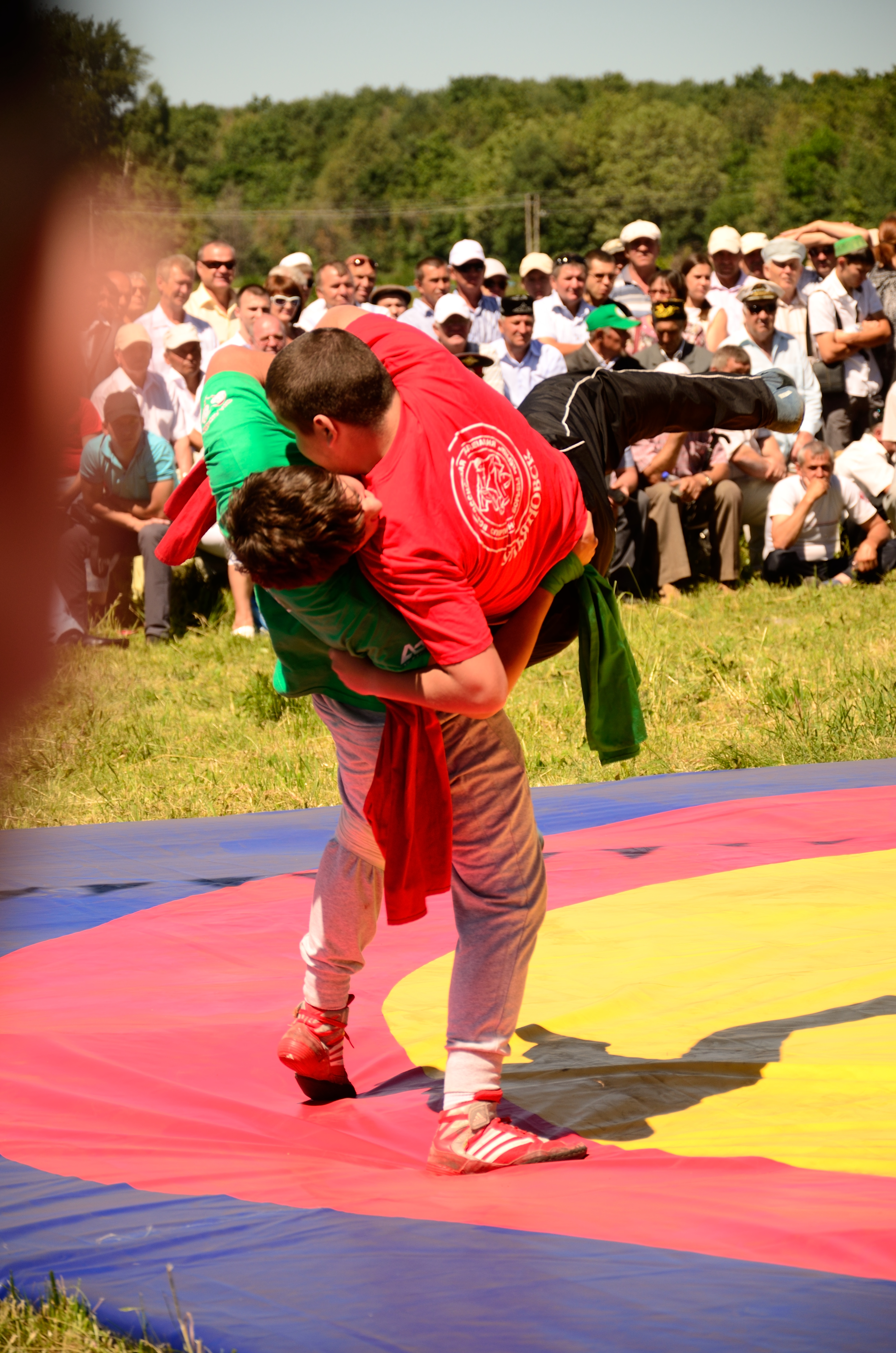
Köräş (Tatar:Көрәш) on a Sabantuy in Ulyanovsk

The wrestling Kurash, is the main competition of Sabantuy. Wrestlers use towels and the aim is to knock down the opponent.

Usually young boys start the competition. At the end of Sabantuy, the main event of the festival is the final of köräş. The winner becomes the batır, the hero of the Sabantuy. The prize varies from a ram in small villages to a car at big cities' celebrations.

=== Calendar of the festival ===
Sabantuylar do not have a set date. The festivities take place approximately from June 15 to July 1, and usually fall on a Sunday. Initially, Sabantuylar are arranged in villages, followed by Sabantuylar in rural districts, and the final ones taking place in major cities. The last Sabantuy is held in Kazan, the capital of Tatarstan. A similar schedule is applied for Akatuy in Chuvashia and Habantuy in Bashkortostan.

In the last few years the Russian government arranged federal Sabantuylar in Moscow. Many cities in Europe and Asia that have major Tatar diasporas, such as Moscow, Saint Petersburg, Tallinn, Prague, Istanbul, Kyiv and Tashkent, also hold Sabantuylar.

Today Sabantuy can be characterized as an international festival attracting many people of various ethnicities who participate in Sabantuylar, both in Tatarstan, and all over the world.

== Political traditions ==
Sabantuy is a symbol of Tatarstan. This is why every Russian president visiting the republic takes part in the Sabantuy held in Kazan. During his visit to Kazan in the mid-1990s Boris Yeltsin became the center of attention at a Sabantuy when he took part in a traditional competition in which the participants try to crash a clay pot while being blindfolded. Vladimir Putin took part in a humorous competition during which he tried to dip his face into a jar full of sour milk in order to fish out a coin without using his hands.

In China, Sabantuy is listed as a national intangible cultural heritage.
