= Fuzhou =

Capital of Fujian, China

Fuzhou 福州市 Hokchew, Foochow
- Prefecture-level city
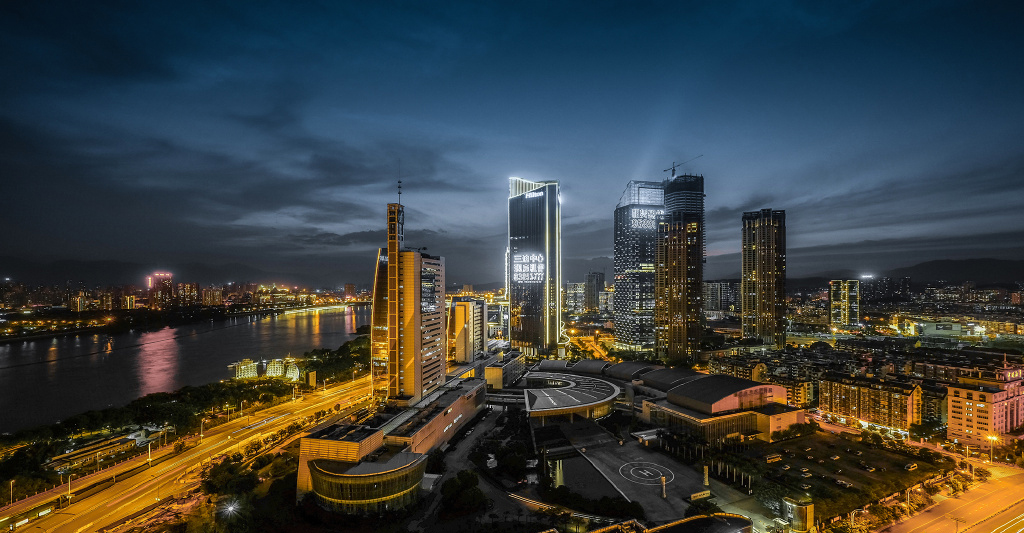
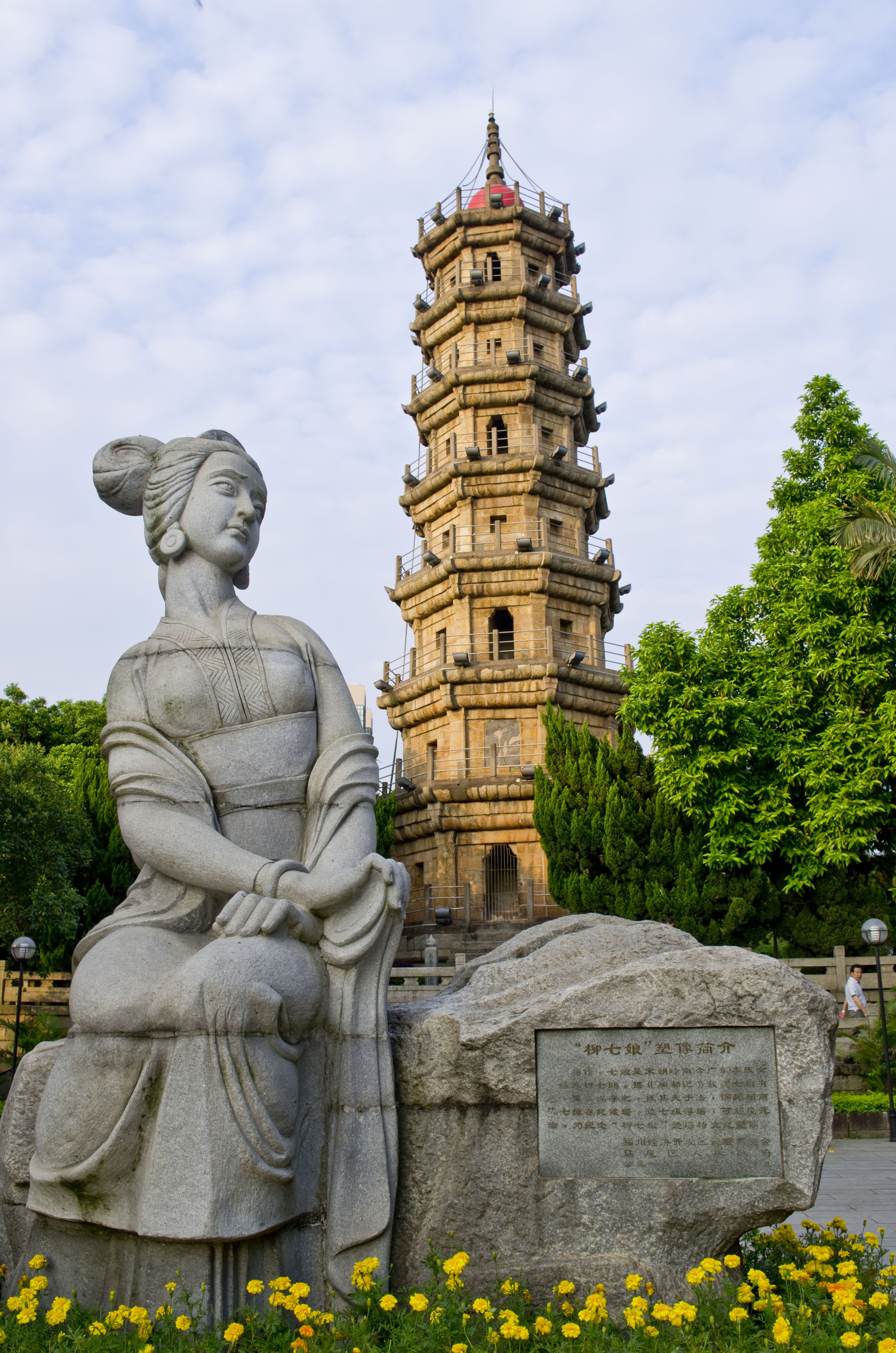
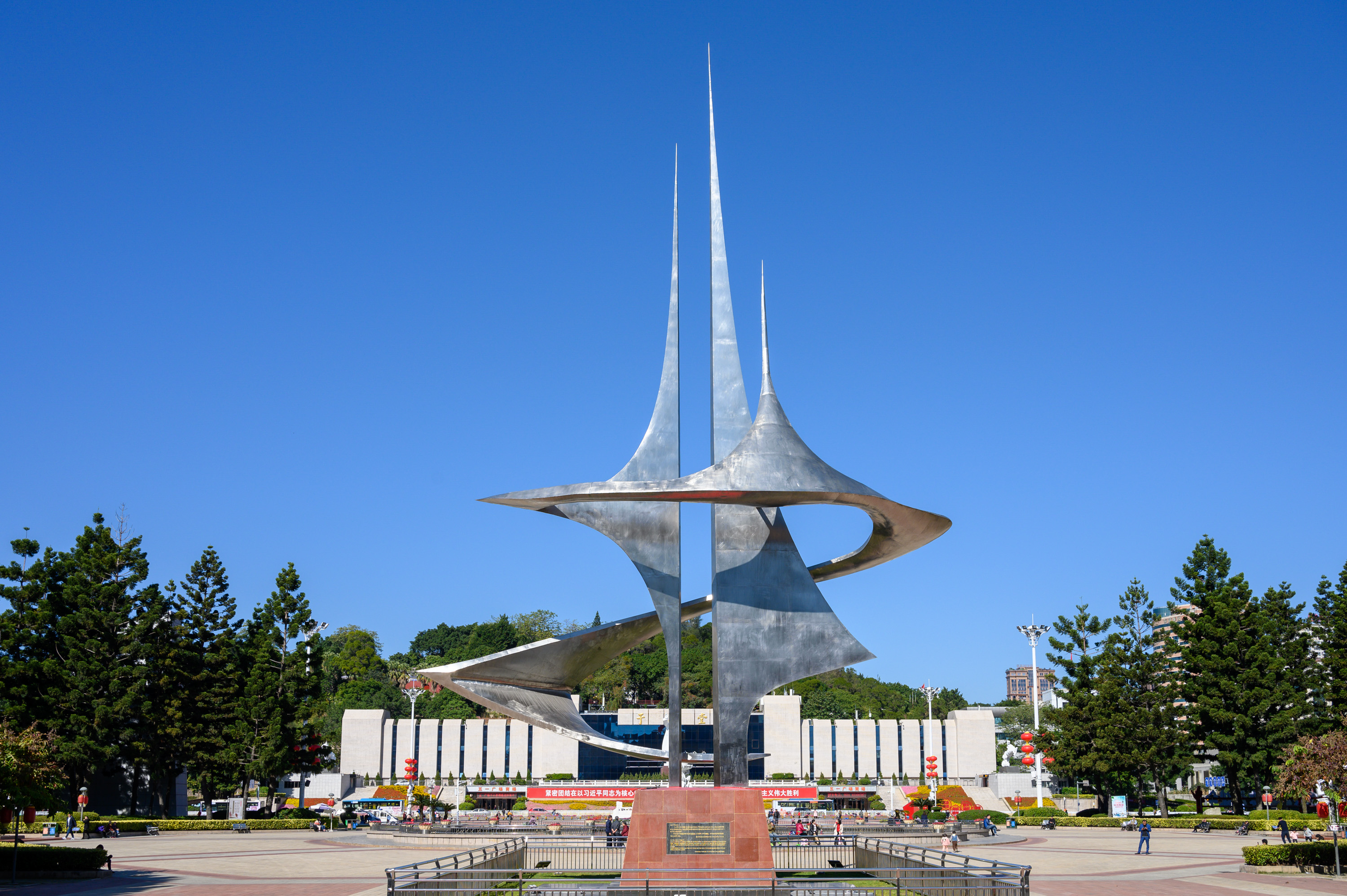
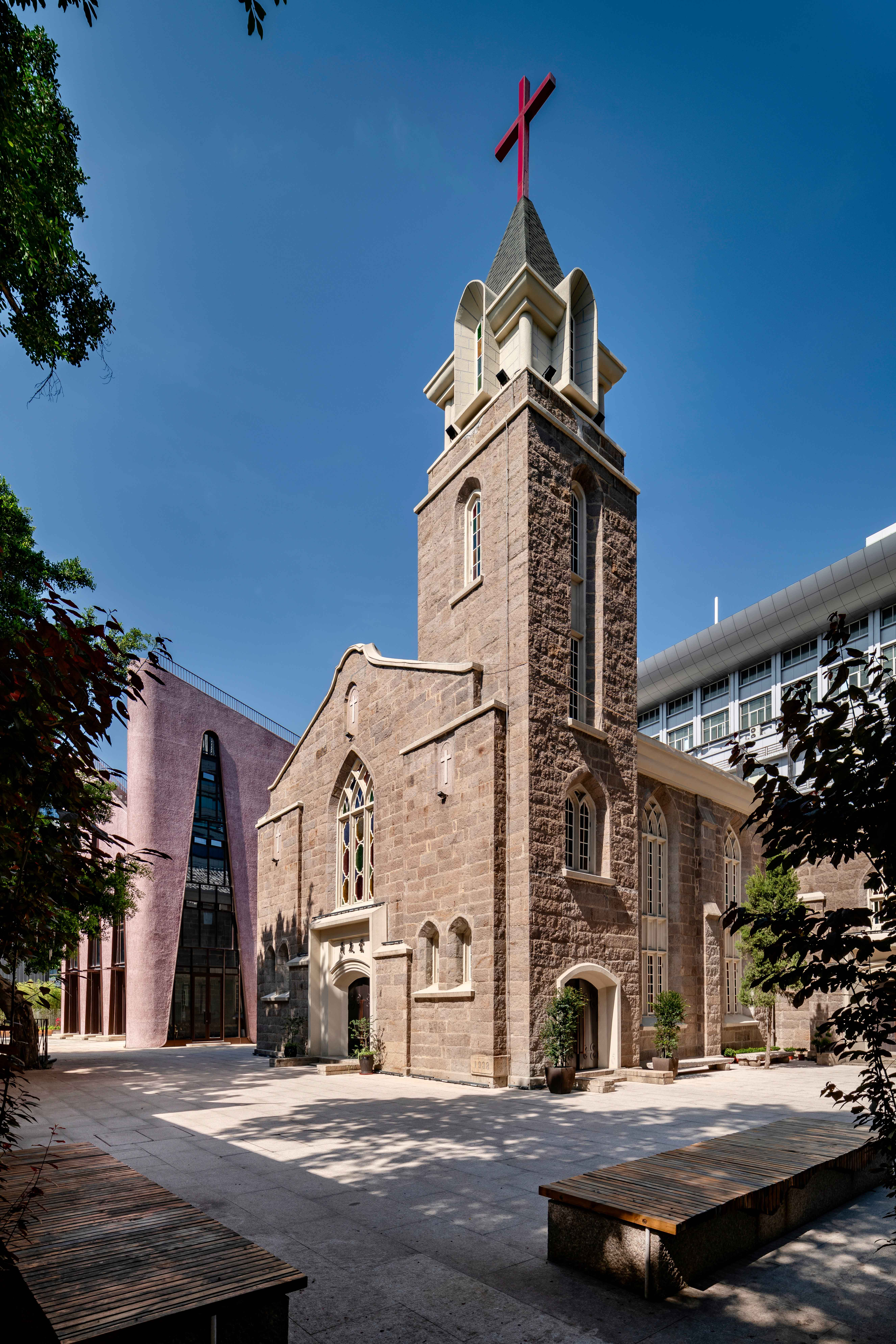
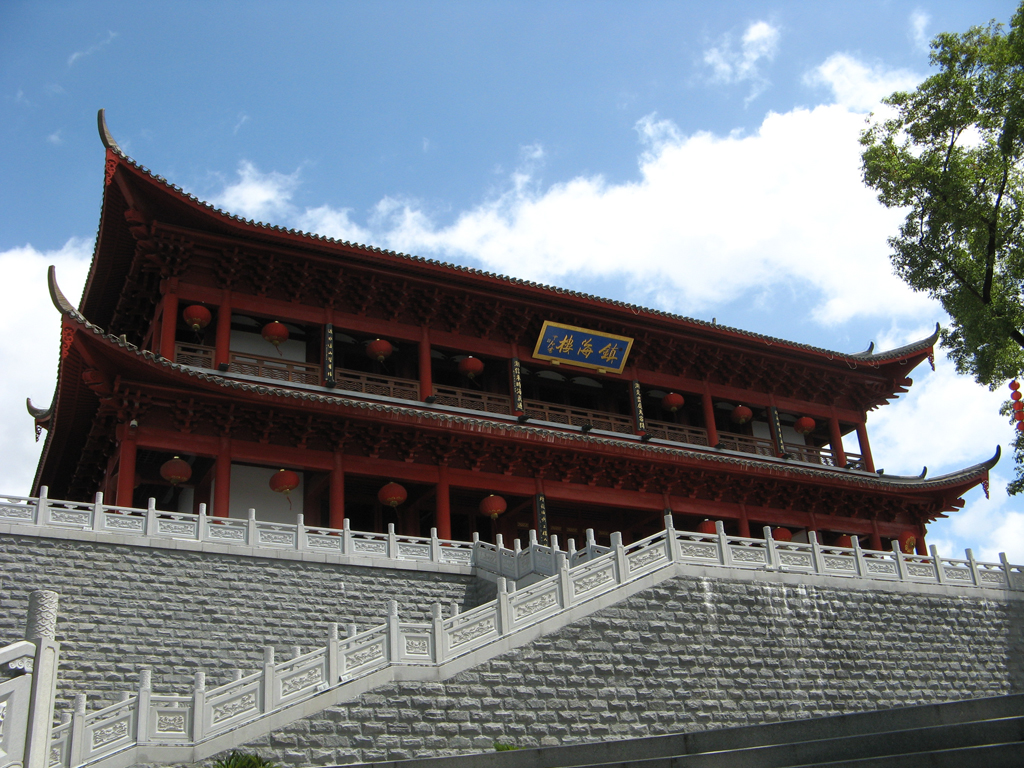
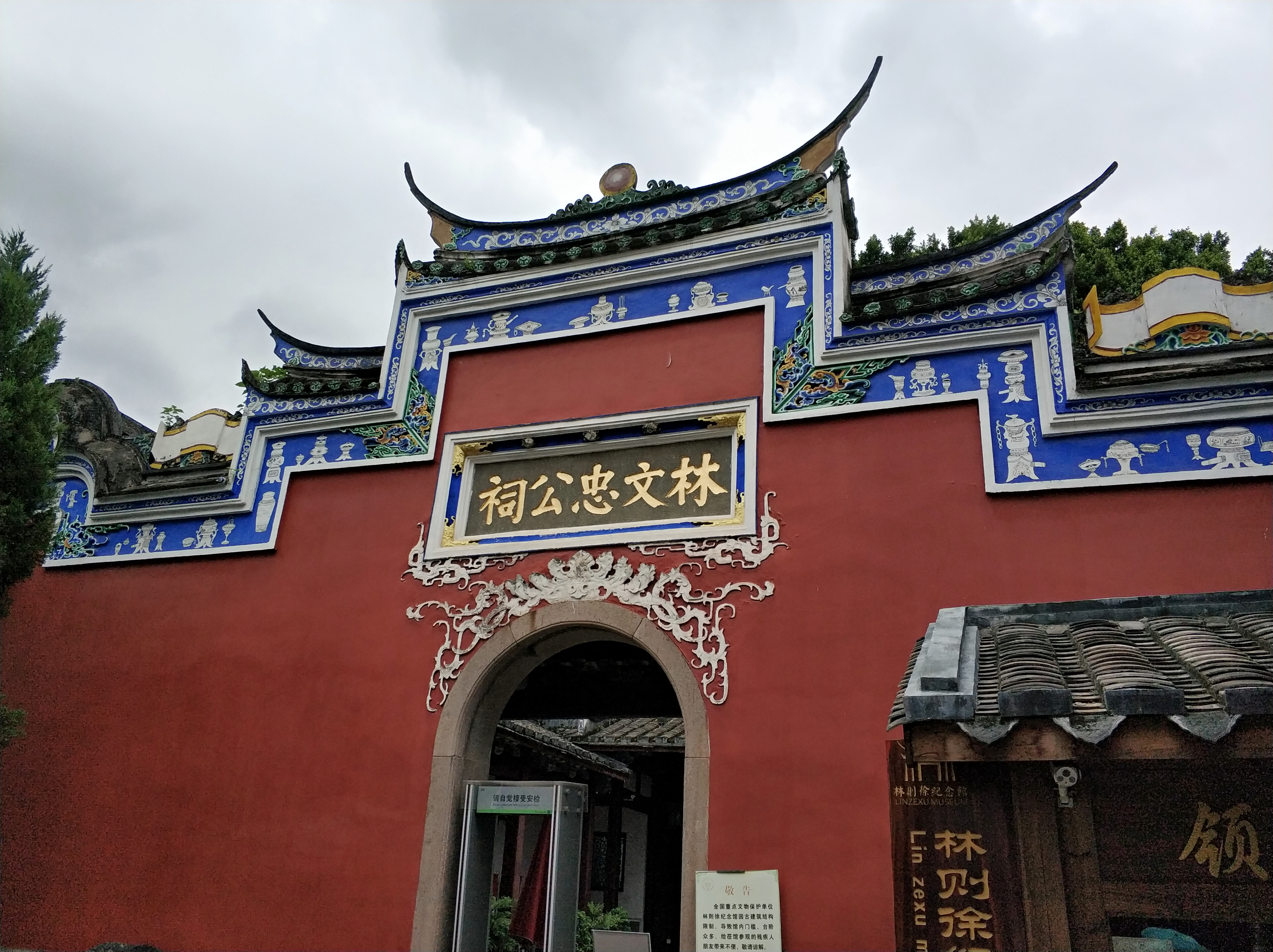
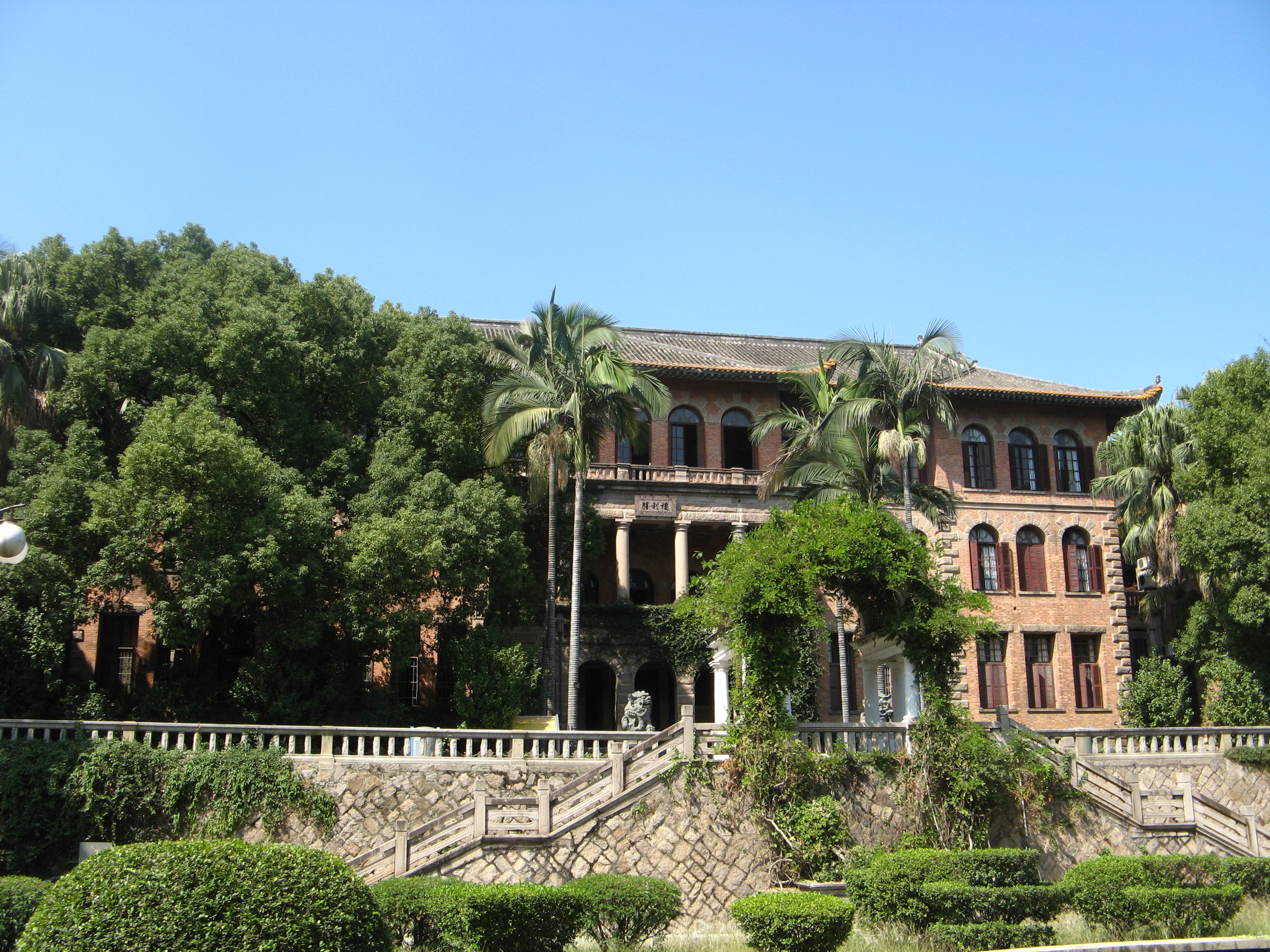
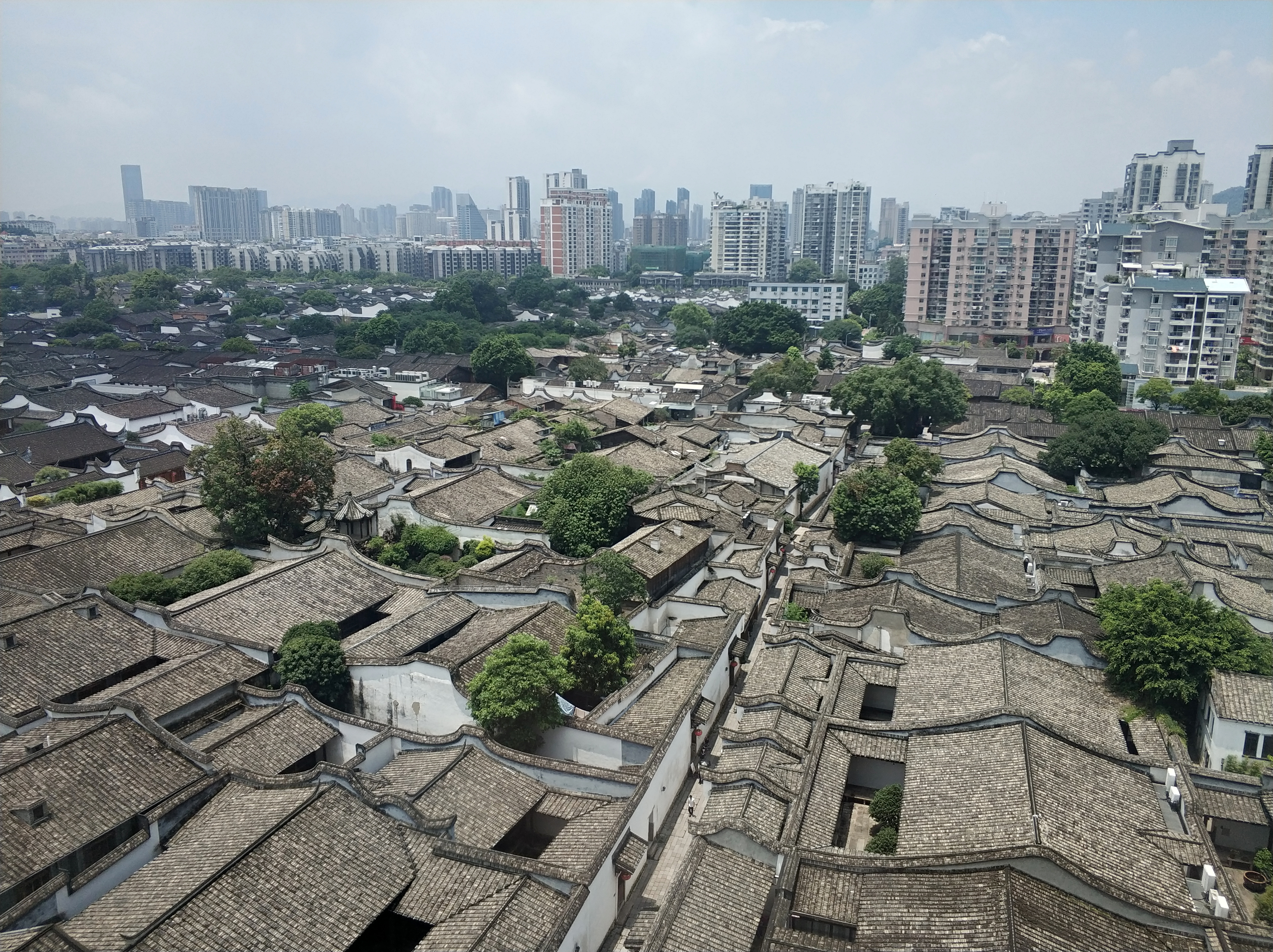
- Fuzhou Taixi CBD Luoxing Tower Three Mountains and One River Sculpture Flower Lane Church Zhenhai Tower Temple of Lin Zexu Hwa Nan College Sanfang Qixiang

- Location of Fuzhou City jurisdiction in Fujian
- Interactive map of Fuzhou
- Location in China Fuzhou (China)
- Coordinates (Fuzhou municipal government): 26°04′27″N 119°17′47″E
- Country: China
- Province: Fujian
- Municipal seat: Gulou District
- Divisions: County-level: 6 districts, 6 counties, & 1 County-level cities(2017)

Government
  - Type: Prefecture-level city
  - Body: Fuzhou Municipal People's Congress
  - CCP Secretary: Qin Haixiang
  - Congress Chairman: Zhang Zhong
  - Mayor: Wu Xiande
  - CPPCC Chairman: Cai Yadong

Area
  - Prefecture-level city: 12,231.9 km^{2} (4,722.8 sq mi)
  - Water: 4,634 km^{2} (1,789 sq mi)
  - Urban (2018): 1,768.2 km^{2} (682.7 sq mi)

Population (2020 census)
  - Prefecture-level city: 8,291,268
  - Density: 677.840/km^{2} (1,755.60/sq mi)
  - Urban: 4,094,491
  - Urban density: 2,315.6/km^{2} (5,997.4/sq mi)
  - Rural: 4,196,777

GDP (2025)
  - Prefecture-level city: CN¥ 1,511 trillion US$ 219.12 billion
  - Per capita: CN¥ 171,708; US$ 24,111
- Time zone: UTC+8 (CST)
- Postal code: 350000
- Area code: 591
- ISO 3166 code: CN-FJ-01
- License plate prefixes: 闽A
- Local dialect: Fuzhou language of the Eastern Min Language
- Website: Fuzhou.gov.cn

Fuzhou
- "Fuzhou" in Chinese characters
- Chinese: 福州
- Postal: Foochow
- Literal meaning: "Blessed Prefecture"
Transcriptions
Standard Mandarin
- Hanyu Pinyin: Fúzhōu
- Gwoyeu Romatzyh: Fwujou
- Wade–Giles: Fu^{2}-chou^{1}
- IPA: [fǔ.ʈʂóʊ]
Wu
- Suzhounese: Foq^{7}-tseu^{1}
Hakka
- Romanization: Fuk-chiu
Yue: Cantonese
- Yale Romanization: Fūk-jāu
- Jyutping: Fuk^{1}-zau^{1}
- IPA: [fʊk̚˥.tsɐw˥]
Southern Min
- Hokkien POJ: Hok-chiu
- Tâi-lô: Hok-tsiu
Eastern Min
- Fuzhou BUC: Hók-ciŭ

Fuzhou (Note: /fuːˈdʒoʊ/; Chinese: 福州; pinyin: Fúzhōu, Fuzhounese: Hokchew, Hók-ciŭ; alternately romanized as Foochow) is the capital of Fujian, China, lying between the Min River estuary to the south and the city of Ningde to the north. Together, Fuzhou and Ningde make up the Mindong linguistic and cultural region.

Fuzhou's population was 8,291,268 as of the 2020 Chinese census. Like other prefecture-level cities in China, its administrative area contains both urban and rural areas: in 2020, 72.49% of inhabitants (6,010,242) were urban, while 27.51% (2,281,026) were rural. As of 31 December 2018, the total population was estimated at 7,740,000 whom 4,665,000 lived in the built-up (or metro) area made of five urban districts plus Minhou County. In 2015, Fuzhou was ranked as the 10th fastest growing metropolitan area in the world by Brookings Institution. Fuzhou is listed as No. 20 in the China Integrated City Index 2016's total ranking, a study conducted by the National Development and Reform Commission.

Fuzhou is also a major city for scientific research, appearing in the global top 50 cities as tracked by the Nature Index. The city is home to several major universities, notably Fuzhou University, one of China's key universities and other public universities, including Fujian Normal University and Fujian Agriculture and Forestry University.

== Names ==
The Yuanhe Maps and Records of Prefectures and Counties, a Chinese geographical treatise published in the 9th century during the Tang dynasty, says that Fuzhou's name came from Mount Fu, (Chinese: 福山; pinyin: Fú Shān) a mountain said to be northwest of the city. The mountain's name was then combined with -zhou, meaning "settlement" or "prefecture", in a manner similar to many other Chinese cities. The eponymous mountain has been identified variously with Mount Dongfeng (董奉山; Dǒngfèng Shān), Mount Baofu (保福山; Bǎofú Shān) (now Baofu Village, in western Fuzhou), Mount Xiandong (仙洞山; Xiāndòng Shān) or Lianhua Peak (莲花峰; Liánhuā Fēng).

During the Warring States period, the area of Fuzhou under the Minyue Kingdom was referred to as Ye (Chinese: 冶; pinyin: Yě; Foochow Romanized: Iā), before Fuzhou was incorporated into China proper during Qin dynasty. The city's name was changed numerous times between the 3rd and 9th centuries, among them Jianzhou (Chinese: 建州; pinyin: Jiànzhōu) in the year 618, Quanzhou (Chinese: 泉州; pinyin: Quánzhōu, not to be confused with the current Quanzhou in the south of Fujian) in 623, Minzhou (Chinese: 闽州; pinyin: Mǐnzhōu) in 711. It was first officially named Fuzhou in 725, though it changed to Changle Commandery in 742, before reverting to Fuzhou in 758. Under the Min Kingdom, Fuzhou reverted to being called Changle, before finally settling on Fuzhou in 948 during the reign of Min emperor Wang Yanzheng. This continued under the Southern Tang and the Song dynasty until 1276, when it was renamed Fu'an Prefecture (Chinese: 福安府; pinyin: Fú'ān fǔ) and designated the temporary imperial capital, when young Emperor Duanzong ascended the throne there.

In the first year of the Hongwu era of the Ming Dynasty, 1368, Fuzhou Prefecture was established. This continued until 1645, when the Longwu Emperor of the Southern Ming ascended the throne in Fuzhou, designating the city as the temporary imperial capital and renamed the prefecture Tianxing Prefecture (Chinese: 天兴府; pinyin: Tiānxìng fǔ). In 1646, when the Qing emperor took the city, the prefecture name was reverted to Fuzhou.

In Chinese, the city is sometimes referred to by the poetic nickname Rongcheng (Chinese: 榕城; pinyin: Róngchéng; Foochow Romanized: Ṳ̀ng-siàng), lit. 'The Banyan City'; this is also sometimes used as the one-character abbreviation for the city, 榕. Fuzhou is also known as Sanshan (Chinese: 三山; pinyin: Sānshān; Foochow Romanized: Săng-săng, lit. '(City of) Three Mountains') because the three hills historically located within the old city walls became its defining geographical landmarks: Yushan (于山; Yúshān; Foochow Romanized: Ṳ̀-săng), Wushan (乌山; Wūshān; Foochow Romanized: Ŭ-săng) and Pingshan (屏山; Píngshān; Foochow Romanized: Bìng-săng).

Other sobriquets include the "Heavenly Granary of Minzhong (or Central Fujian)" (Chinese: 闽中天府; pinyin: Mǐnzhōng Tiānfǔ), dating from the Ming dynasty and referring to the natural abundance of marine resources and maritime trade links); the "Ancient Capital of Five Dynasties" (Chinese: 五朝古都; pinyin: Wǔcháo Gǔdū), referring to the Minyue Kingdom, the Min Kingdom, Southern Song, Southern Ming, and the Fujian People's Government; and the "Chief Prefecture of the Eight Min" (the Eight Prefectures of Fujian) (Chinese: 八闽首府; pinyin: Bāmǐn Shǒufǔ), in reference to the administrative divisions of Fujian during the Song dynasty.

In older English publications, the name is variously romanized as Foochow, Foo-Chow,, Fu-chou, Fuchou, Fuchow, Fugiu, Fūtsu, Fuh-Chow, Hock Chew, Hokchew and Hokciu.

== History ==
=== Prehistory ===
Bone analysis has found genetic connections between the ancient inhabitants of Xiying (7300–6500 BC) and Austronesian peoples. The site of the Keqiutou culture (simplified Chinese: 壳丘头文化; traditional Chinese: 殼丘頭文化; 6500–5000 BC) appears to have been a planned settlement and is the oldest known site of rice cultivation in Fujian. Artifacts from these sites appear connected to the Dapenkeng culture (6000–4500 BC) on Taiwan.

The Fuzhou area is also the site of Tanshishan (曇石山文化; c. 3000 BC) neolithic culture, which also transitions into Bronze Age artifacts from the Huangtulun culture. The archeological remains demonstrate that the lower Min River supported communities with established burial traditions, specialized crafts and diversified food production, with a maritime-oriented economy being fundamental.

=== Minyue ===
During the Warring States period (5th–3rd centuries BC), the Chinese began referring to the present area of Fujian as Minyue, reckoning their people among the Baiyue who once inhabited most of southeastern China. In 306 BC, the state of Yue originally centered on the Shaoxing area of Zhejiang Province fell to Chu. The Han-era historian Sima Qian wrote that the surviving members of the Yue royal family fled south to what is now Fujian, where they settled alongside its own Yue people to create Minyue.

The First Emperor of the Qin unified ancient China in 221 BC and desired to bring the southern and southeast regions under Chinese rule. The Qin organized its territory into commanderies roughly equivalent to modern prefectures, with Minzhong Commandery (閩中郡) overseeing Qin territory in Fujian. The area seems to have continued mostly independent of Chinese control for the next century, however.

The Han dynasty that followed Qin initially ruled much of eastern China through vassal kingdoms, with both Minyue and Nanyue largely autonomous. In 202 BC, Emperor Gaozu enfeoffed a leader named Wuzhu (無諸, Old Chinese Matya) as king of Minyue. King Wuzhu established a walled city called Ye (冶, Old Chinese Lya, "Beautiful") the same year, a date now taken as the establishment of Fuzhou. In 110 BC, the armies of the Wu Emperor defeated Minyue during the Han–Minyue War, annexing its territory and people into China. Many Minyue citizens were forcibly relocated into the Jianghuai area, and the Yue ethnic group was mostly assimilated into the Han Chinese, causing a sharp decline in Ye's inhabitants. The area was reorganized as a county in 85 BC.

=== Three Kingdoms to the Tang dynasty ===
During the Three Kingdoms period, southeast China was nominally under the control of Eastern Wu, and the Fuzhou area had a shipyard for the coastal and Yangtze River fleets. In 282, during the Jin dynasty, two artificial lakes known simply as the East Lake and West Lake were constructed in Ye, as well as a canal system. The core of modern Fuzhou grew around these three water systems, though the East and West Lakes no longer exist. In 308, during the War of the Eight Princes at the end of the Jin dynasty, the first large-scale migration of Chinese immigrants moved to the south and southeast of China began, followed by subsequent waves during later periods of warfare or natural disaster in the Chinese heartland. The administrative and economic center of the Fujian area was still the Ye area during the Sui dynasty (581–618).

Fuzhou prospered during the Tang dynasty. Buddhism was quickly adopted by citizens who quickly built many Buddhist temples in the area. In 725, the city was formally renamed Fuzhou. Throughout the mid-Tang dynasty, Fuzhou's economic and cultural institutions grew and developed. The later years of the Tang saw a number of political upheavals in the Chinese heartland such as the An Lushan Rebellion and Huang Chao Rebellion, prompting another wave of northerners to immigrate to the modern-day Northern Min and Eastern Min areas. In 879, a large part of the city was captured by the army of Huang Chao during their rebellion against the Tang government.

=== Min Kingdom ===
In 893, the warlord brothers Wang Chao and Wang Shenzhi captured Fuzhou in a rebellion against the Tang dynasty, successfully gaining control of the entire Fujian Province and eventually proclaiming their founding of an independent kingdom they called the Min Kingdom in 909. The Wang realm had its main capital at Changle (長樂, "Lasting Joy"), sometimes conflated with Fuzhou and now one of its districts. The Wang brothers enticed more immigrants from the north but the realm splintered after Wang Chao's death. The northeastern commanderies became the separate Yin Kingdom, which eventually absorbed Min while taking its name.

In 945, the Southern Tang dynasty took advantage of civil strife in the Min Kingdom, and launched an attack, culminating in the Battle of Fuzhou; the result was Fuzhou became a vassal of Wuyue. In 978, Fuzhou was incorporated into the newly founded Song dynasty, though their control of the mountainous regions was tenuous.

=== Song dynasty ===
Fuzhou underwent a major dramatic surge in its refined culture and educational institutions throughout the Song dynasty as Fuzhou produced 10 Fuzhounese zhuangyuan scholars (scholar who is ranked the top first place in the imperial examinations), a large number for a city in the country during that dynasty.

The "Hualin" Temple (華林寺, not to be confused with the temple of the same name in Guangzhou), founded in 964, is one of the oldest and surviving wooden structures in China. New city walls were built in 282, 901, 905, and 974, so the city had many layers of walls – more so than the Chinese capital. Emperor Taizong of the Song dynasty ordered the destruction of all the walls in Fuzhou in 978 but new walls were rebuilt later. The latest was built in 1371. During the Southern Song dynasty, Fuzhou became more prosperous; many scholars came to live and work. Among them were Zhu Xi, the most celebrated Chinese philosopher after Confucius, and Xin Qiji, the greatest composer of the ci form of poetry.

=== Yuan dynasty ===
In the accounts of his supposed travels during the Yuan dynasty, Marco Polo mentioned the city as Fugiu. This would have represented not the local Min pronunciation but that of the mandarin administrative class. According to Odoric of Pordenone, another traveler of the era, Fuzhou had the biggest chickens in the world.

=== Ming dynasty ===
Between 1405 and 1433, fleets of the Ming Imperial navy under Admiral Zheng He visited Fuzhou en route to the Indian Ocean, with the port of Wuhumen (Chinese: 五虎门; pinyin: Wǔhǔmén) in Changle being the last major domestic stop before the open ocean. It is recorded that the fleet often spent several months in port there before setting off, as long as spending eight months in Changle in 1431; one possible reason is the wait for the appropriate monsoon winds. Zheng built a new shrine to Tian-Fei (also known as Matsu) at Nanshan (Chinese: 南山; pinyin: Nán Shān, literally "South Mountain") in Changle, known as the Nanshan Tian-Fei Palace (Chinese: 南山天妃宫; pinyin: Nán Shān Tiānfēi Gōng), as well as refurbishing other shrines such as the Buddhist temple there. In 1431, he erected a stele dedicated to the goddess near the seaport, known as the Changle Inscription (Chinese: 长乐天妃灵应之记碑; pinyin: Chánglè Tiānfēi Língyìng zhī jìbēi, literally the Record of the Miraculous Protection of the Celestial Consort (Tian-Fei) at Changle). The stele would only be rediscovered in 1930. Alongside the inscription at Liujiagang and the Galle Trilingual Inscription, the stele stands as historical testament to Zheng He's voyages.

The Ming government gave a monopoly over Philippine trade to Fuzhou, which at times was shared with Quanzhou. The Ryukyu Kingdom also established an embassy in Fuzhou in the eighth year of Chenghua, 1472, at Guan Hou Street, 21; two years later, the Fujian Maritime Trade Supervisorate moved from Quanzhou to Fuzhou.

Galeote Pereira, a Portuguese soldier and trader, was taken prisoner during the pirate extermination campaign of 1549 and imprisoned in Fuzhou. Later transferred to a form of internal exile elsewhere in the province, Pereira escaped to Langbaijiao in 1553. The record of his experiences in the Ming Empire, logged by the Jesuits at Goa in 1561, was the first non-clerical account of China to reach the West since Marco Polo.

=== Qing dynasty ===
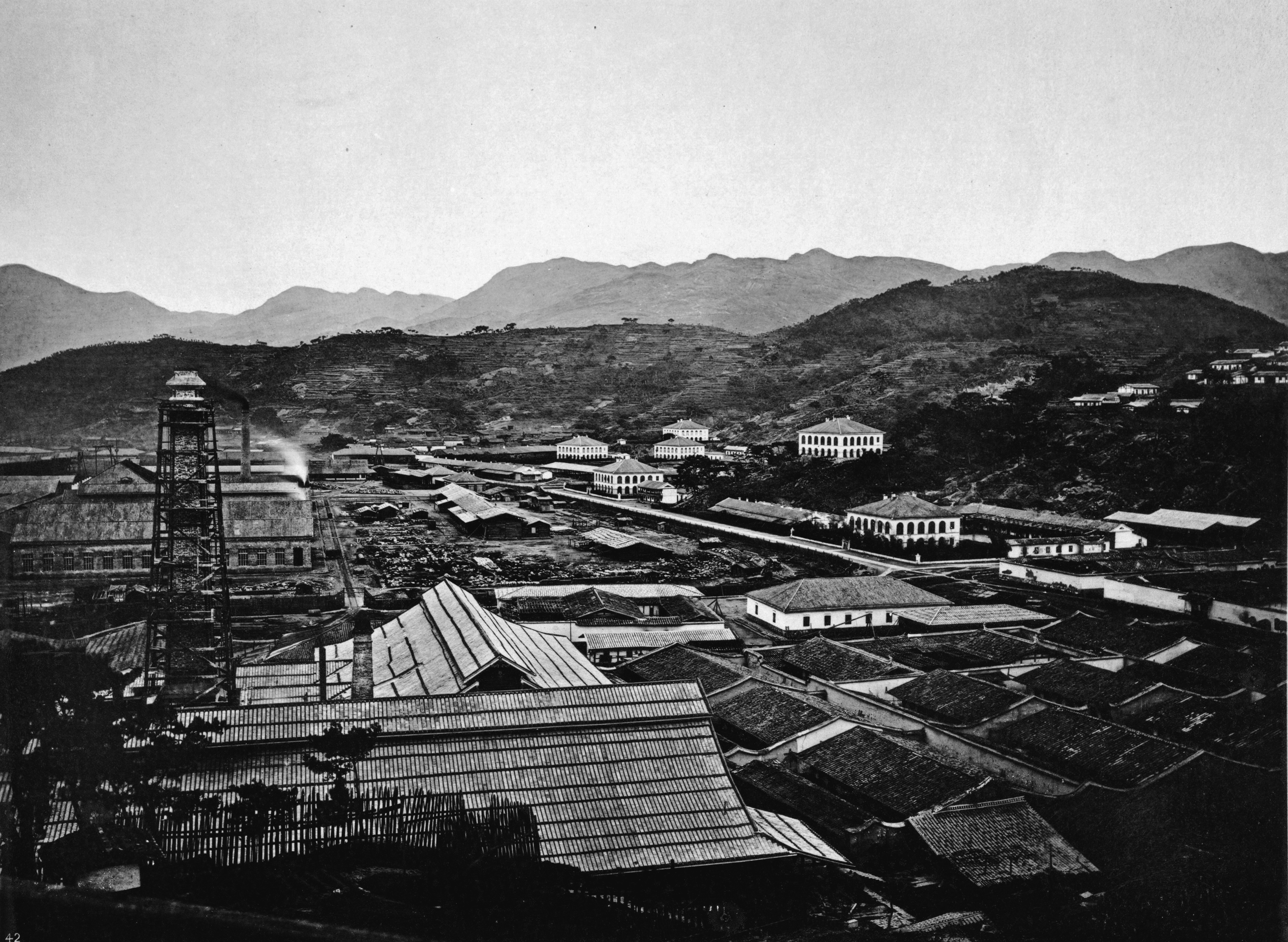
Fuzhou Arsenal in Fuzhou, 1870s

In 1839, Lin Zexu, who himself was a Fuzhou native, was appointed by the Daoguang Emperor to enforce the imperial ban on the opium trade in Canton. His unsuccessful actions, however, precipitated the disastrous First Opium War with Great Britain, and Lin, who had become a scapegoat for China's failure in war, was exiled to the northwestern section of the empire. The Treaty of Nanjing (1842), which put an end to the conflict, made Fuzhou (then known to Westerners as Foochow) one of five Chinese treaty ports, and it became completely open to Western merchants and missionaries.

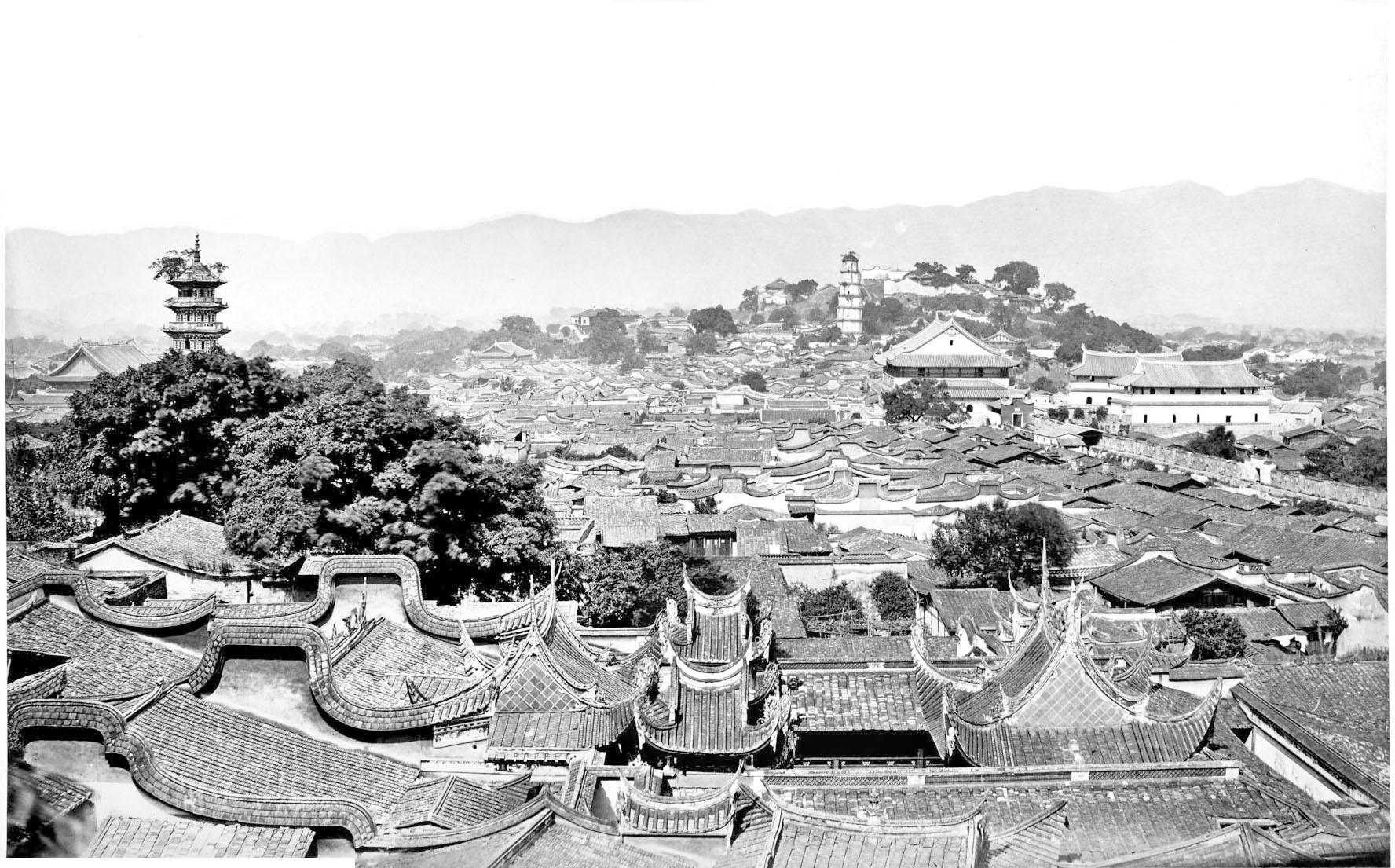
The Eastward View of Fuzhou from Black Stone Hill (circa 1880)

Fuzhou was one of the most important Protestant mission fields in China. On January 2, 1846, the first Protestant missionary, Stephen Johnson of the ABCFM, entered the city and soon set up the first missionary station there. The ABCFM was followed by the Methodist Episcopal Missionary Society that was led by M. C. White and J. D. Collins, who reached Fuzhou in early September 1847. The Church Missionary Society also arrived in the city in May 1850. These three Protestant agencies remained in Fuzhou until the Chinese Communist Revolution in the 1950s, leaving a rich heritage in Fuzhou's Protestant culture. They supported the creation of hospitals and schools, including the Woolston Memorial Hospital, run by the American-trained Hü King Eng.

On August 23, 1884, the Battle of Fuzhou broke out between the French Far East Fleet and the Fujian Fleet of the Qing dynasty. As the result, the Fujian Fleet, one of the four Chinese regional fleets, was destroyed completely in Mawei Harbor.

On November 8, 1911, revolutionaries staged an uprising in Fuzhou. After an overnight street battle, the Qing army surrendered.

=== Fujian People's Government ===
On November 22, 1933, Eugene Chen and the leaders of the National Revolutionary Army's 19th Army set up the short-lived People's Revolutionary Government of Republican China. Blockaded by Chiang Kai-shek and left without support from the nearby Soviet Republic of China, the PRGRC collapsed within two months.

=== Japanese occupation ===
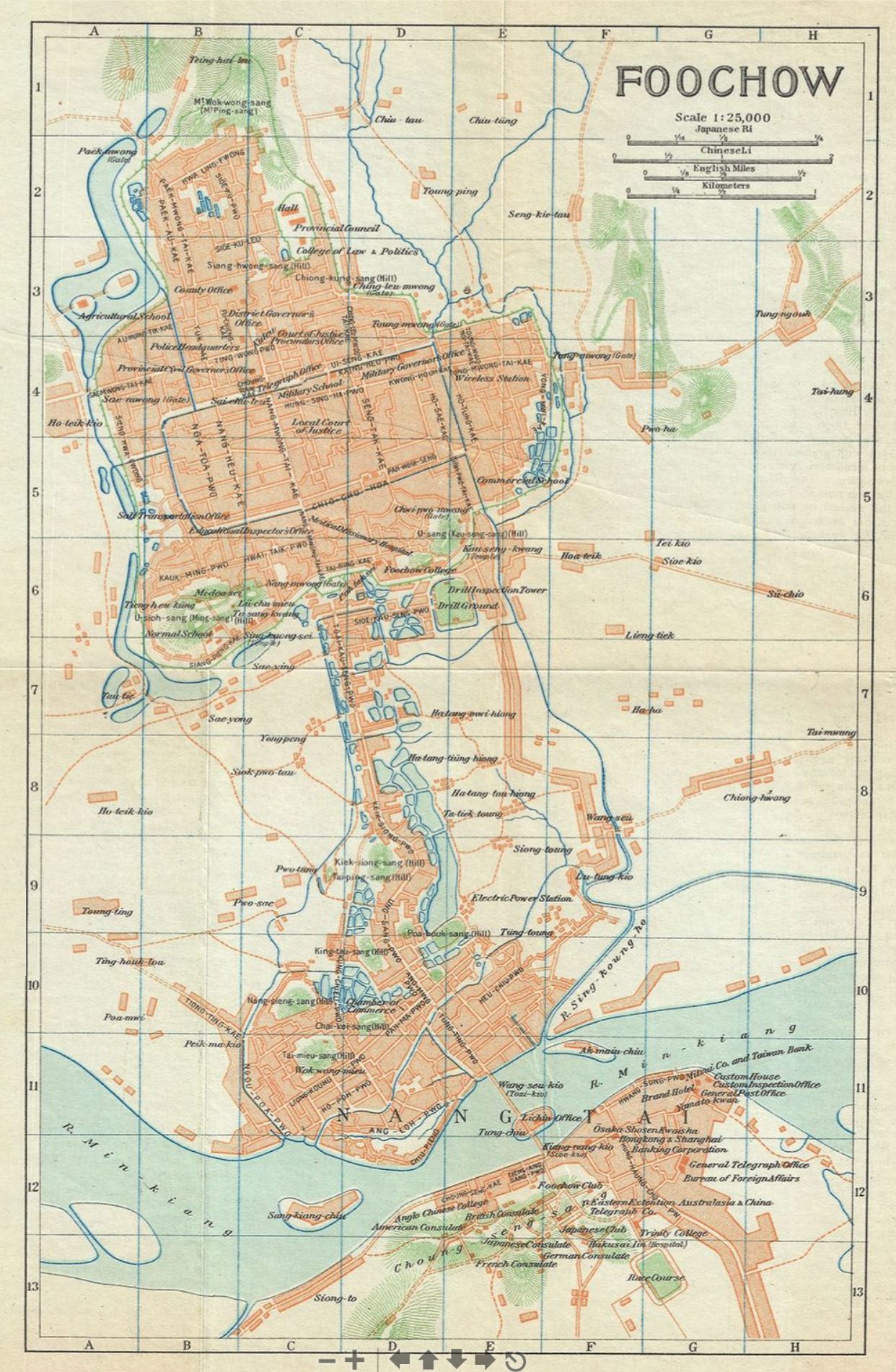
1924 map of Fuzhou ("Foochow")

With the outbreak of World War II, hostilities commenced in Fujian Province. Xiamen (then often known as Amoy in English) fell to a Japanese landing force on May 13, 1938. The fall of Xiamen instantly threatened the security of Fuzhou. On May 23, Japanese ships bombarded Mei-Hua, Huang-chi and Pei-Chiao while Japanese planes continued to harass Chinese forces. Between May 31 and June 1, Chinese gunboats Fu-Ning, Chen-Ning and Suming defending the blockade line in the estuary of the Min River were successively bombed and sunk. Meanwhile, the Chinese ship Chu-Tai berthed at Nan-Tai was damaged. The Chinese Navy's Harbor Command School, barracks, shipyard, hospital and marine barracks at Mawei were successively bombed. Fuzhou fell to Japanese forces in 1938.

The extent of Japanese command and control of the city of Fuzhou itself as opposed to the port at Mawei and the Min River Estuary is uncertain. By 1941 (5/7), the city is recorded as having returned to Nationalist control. The British Consulate in Fuzhou is noted as operational from 1941 to 1944 after the United Kingdom Declaration of War on Japan in December 1941. Western visitors to Fuzhou in the period 1941–1944 include the Australian journalist Wilfred Burchett in 1942 and the British scientist Joseph Needham in May 1944. Both visitors record the presence of a British Consul and a Fuzhou Club comprising western businessmen.

In The Man Who Loved China: The Fantastic Story of the Eccentric Scientist Who Unlocked the Mysteries of the Middle Kingdom, author Simon Winchester relates the visit of Dr Needham in 1944. Needham encountered the American government agent (John Caldwell) and the British SIS agent (Murray MacLehose working undercover as the British Vice-Consul in Fuzhou) involved in aid to the Nationalist resistance to Japanese forces in Fujian Province.

As part of Operation Ichi-Go (1944), the last large-scale Japanese offensive in China in World War II, Japanese troops intended to isolate Fuzhou and the Fujian Province corridor to Nationalist forces in western China and the wartime capital of Chongqing. One account of Japanese troops retaking of Fuzhou city itself is narrated by American naval officer, Houghton Freeman. The date is given as October 5, 1944.

Fuzhou remained under Japanese control until May 18, 1945, months before the atomic bombings.

Following the restoration of Republic control in 1946, the administration divisions of Fuzhou were annexed, and administration level was promoted from county-level to city-level officially.

=== People's Republic of China ===
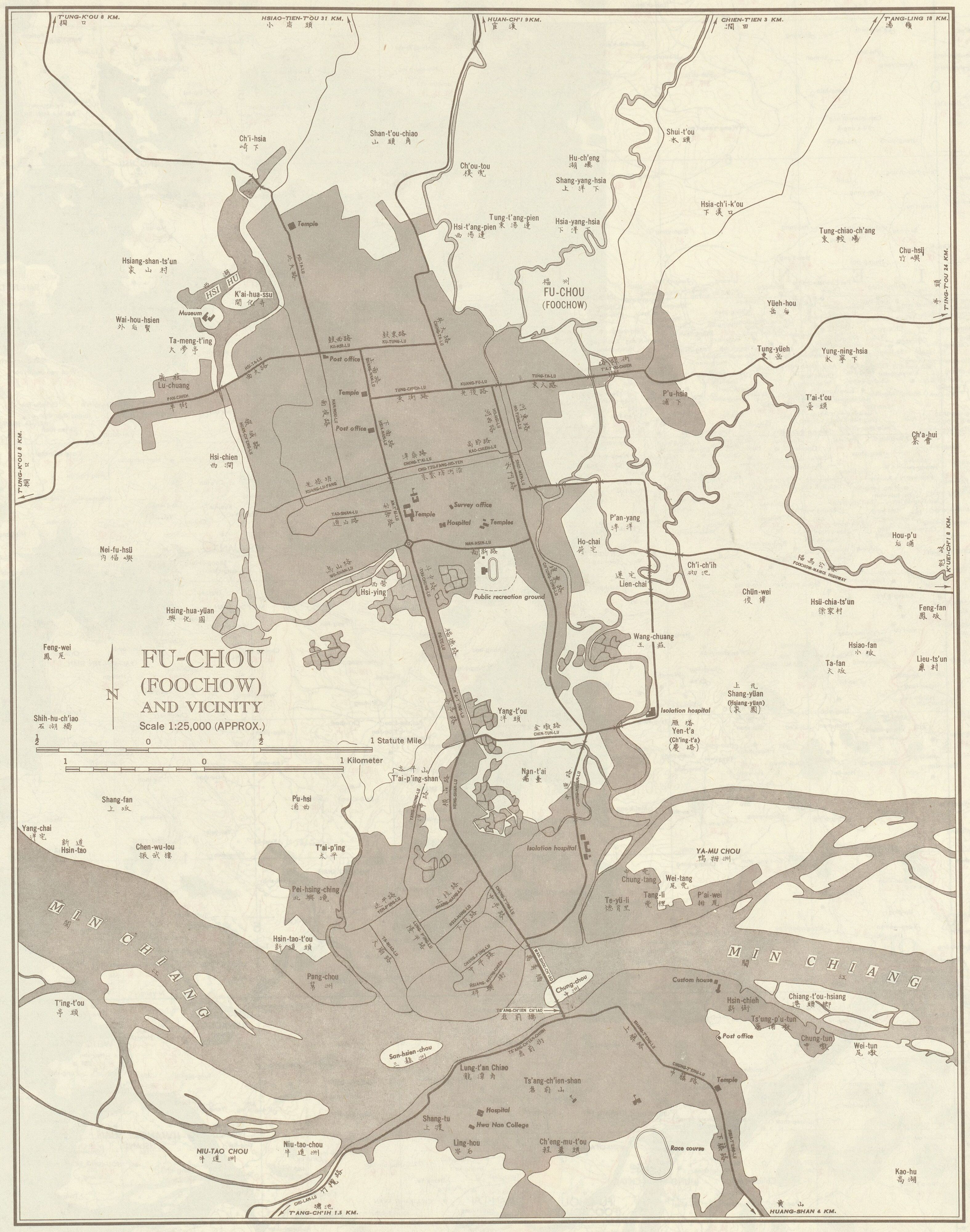
Map of Fuzhou (labeled as FU-CHOU (FOOCHOW))

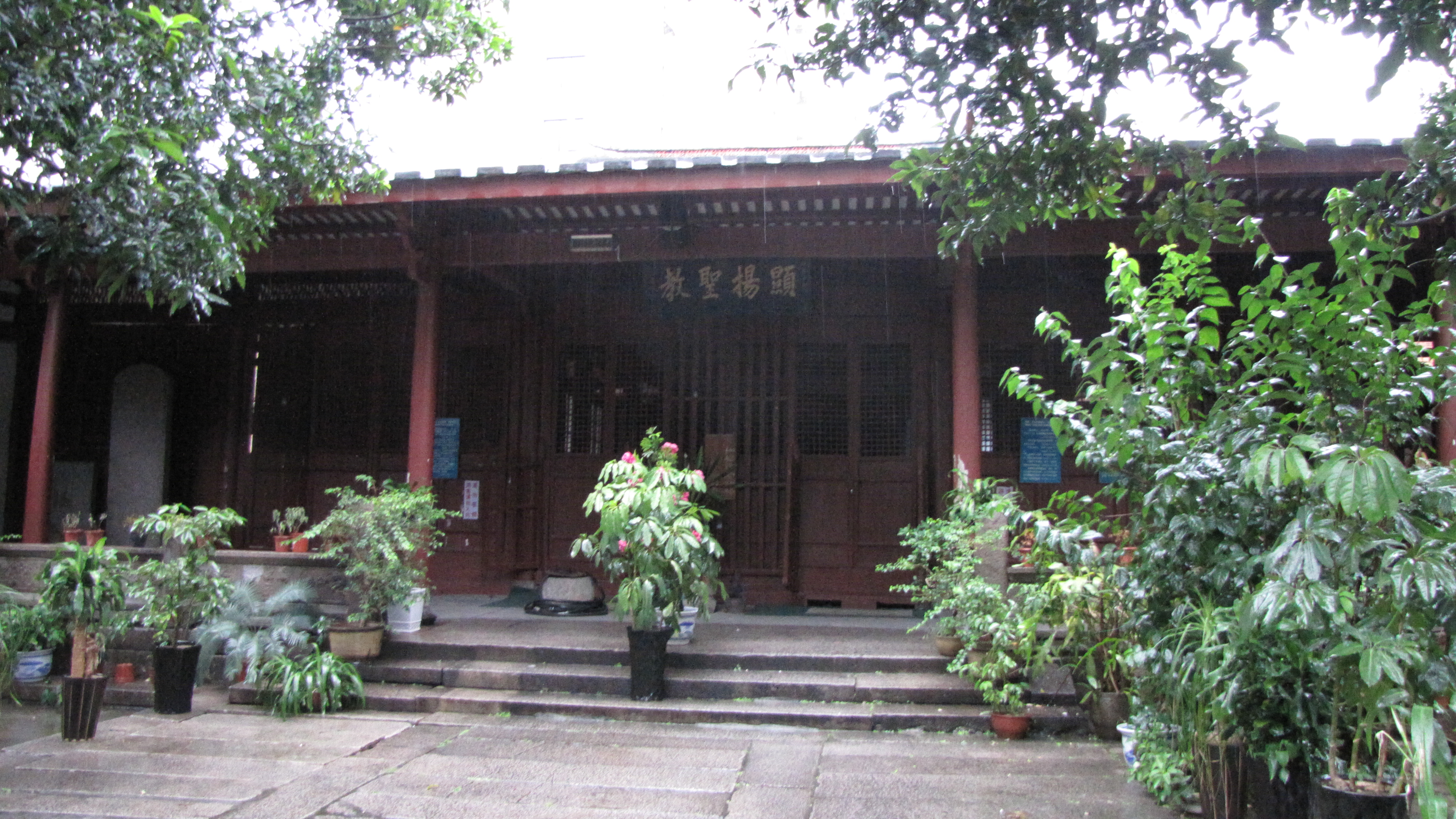
Foochow Mosque in Fuzhou

Fuzhou was occupied by the People's Liberation Army with little resistance on 17 August 1949. In the 1950s, the city was on the front line of the conflict with the KMT in Taiwan, as hostile KMT aircraft frequently bombed the city. The bombing on 20 January 1955 was the most serious one, killing hundreds of people.

Fuzhou was also involved in violent mass chaos during the Cultural Revolution. Different groups of Red Guards fought with each other using guns on the streets of the city, and even attacking the People's Liberation Army.

Under the reform and opening policy since the late 1970s, Fuzhou has developed rapidly. In 1982, Fuzhou became the first city in China where the stored program control was introduced, which marked a milestone in the history of telecommunications in China. In 1984, Fuzhou was chosen as one of the first branches of Open Coastal Cities by the Central Government.

In 1990, Xi Jinping served as the Secretary of the CPC Fuzhou Municipal Committee. He proposed the Fuzhou 3820 Project to establish Fuzhou as the political economic cultural educational transportation and technological center of Fujian Province and the West Coast Economic Zone of the Taiwan Straits. He also planned the development of Fuzhou for the next hundred years. He believed that, with Guangzhou to the south and Shanghai to the north Fuzhou's geographical location was ideal for becoming an international metropolis between the Pearl River Delta and the Yangtze River Delta. He proposed supporting strategies such as the Fujian-Zhejiang-Jiangxi-Anhui Fuzhou Economic Cooperation Zone the Fuzhou Metropolitan Circle, Maritime Fuzhou the Minjiang Estuary Golden Triangle and a Modern International City as well as the idea of building a high-speed rail corridor to Taipei. Xi Jinping served as the Secretary of the Fuzhou Municipal Committee for more than six years and lived in Fuzhou for nearly thirteen years, developing a deep affection for the city. When he visited Fuzhou again in 2021, he remarked that Fuzhou could make significant contributions to the great rejuvenation and unification of the Chinese nation, noting that the airport in Changle was built to support the city's expansion towards the sea.

On December 13, 1993, a raging fire swept through a textile factory in Fuzhou and claimed the lives of 61 workers. The arsonist was identified as a 19-year-old Dong Yangling, a former worker at the factory who was fired after stealing materials. She set the fire as an act of revenge. She was sentenced to death.

On October 2, 2005, floodwaters from Typhoon Longwang swept away a military school, killing at least 80 paramilitary officers.

== Geography ==
=== Climate ===
Fuzhou has a humid subtropical climate (Köppen: Cfa) influenced by the East Asian monsoon; the summers are long, very hot and humid, and the winters are short, mild and dry. In most years, torrential rain occurs during the monsoon in the second half of May. Fuzhou is also liable to typhoons in late summer and early autumn. The monthly 24-hour average temperature ranges from 11.4 °C (52.5 °F) in January to 29.4 °C (84.9 °F) in July, while the annual mean is 20.5 °C (68.9 °F). With monthly percent possible sunshine ranging from 26% in March to 51% in July, the city receives 1,607 hours of bright sunshine annually. Extremes since 1951 have ranged from −1.9 °C (29 °F) on 25 January 2016 to 41.9 °C (107 °F) on 24 July 2022. Snow is very rare, having covered the ground last times in February 1957, December 1975 and December 1991.

Fuzhou is located in the northeast coast of Fujian province, connects jointly northwards with Ningde and Nanping, southwards with Quanzhou and Putian, westwards with Sanming respectively.

Climate data for Fuzhou, elevation 84 m (276 ft), (1991–2020 normals, extremes 1951–present)
Month	Jan	Feb	Mar	Apr	May	Jun	Jul	Aug	Sep	Oct	Nov	Dec	Year
Record high °C (°F)	27.8 (82.0)	32.3 (90.1)	34.2 (93.6)	35.7 (96.3)	38.5 (101.3)	38.7 (101.7)	41.9 (107.4)	41.4 (106.5)	39.6 (103.3)	38.0 (100.4)	33.2 (91.8)	29.8 (85.6)	41.9 (107.4)
Mean maximum °C (°F)	23.6 (74.5)	26.5 (79.7)	29.4 (84.9)	32.4 (90.3)	34.6 (94.3)	37.3 (99.1)	39.3 (102.7)	38.6 (101.5)	36.1 (97.0)	32.4 (90.3)	29.1 (84.4)	24.8 (76.6)	39.8 (103.6)
Mean daily maximum °C (°F)	15.5 (59.9)	16.6 (61.9)	19.3 (66.7)	24.1 (75.4)	27.8 (82.0)	31.2 (88.2)	34.6 (94.3)	33.8 (92.8)	31.1 (88.0)	26.9 (80.4)	22.6 (72.7)	17.8 (64.0)	25.1 (77.2)
Daily mean °C (°F)	11.4 (52.5)	12.0 (53.6)	14.4 (57.9)	19.0 (66.2)	23.1 (73.6)	26.6 (79.9)	29.4 (84.9)	28.9 (84.0)	26.7 (80.1)	22.7 (72.9)	18.6 (65.5)	13.7 (56.7)	20.5 (69.0)
Mean daily minimum °C (°F)	8.8 (47.8)	9.3 (48.7)	11.3 (52.3)	15.7 (60.3)	20.0 (68.0)	23.7 (74.7)	26.0 (78.8)	25.7 (78.3)	23.8 (74.8)	19.7 (67.5)	15.8 (60.4)	10.9 (51.6)	17.6 (63.6)
Mean minimum °C (°F)	4.2 (39.6)	4.7 (40.5)	6.9 (44.4)	11.4 (52.5)	16.3 (61.3)	20.8 (69.4)	24.0 (75.2)	23.8 (74.8)	20.8 (69.4)	15.1 (59.2)	10.2 (50.4)	5.3 (41.5)	3.1 (37.6)
Record low °C (°F)	−1.9 (28.6)	−0.8 (30.6)	0.3 (32.5)	5.2 (41.4)	10.9 (51.6)	15.4 (59.7)	19.0 (66.2)	20.3 (68.5)	15.0 (59.0)	9.6 (49.3)	3.1 (37.6)	−1.7 (28.9)	−1.9 (28.6)
Average precipitation mm (inches)	56.3 (2.22)	78.6 (3.09)	129.9 (5.11)	139.8 (5.50)	189.3 (7.45)	228.7 (9.00)	150.1 (5.91)	193.4 (7.61)	133.0 (5.24)	48.7 (1.92)	51.0 (2.01)	43.3 (1.70)	1,442.1 (56.76)
Average precipitation days (≥ 0.1 mm)	10.0	13.1	16.3	15.3	16.9	15.9	10.3	13.4	10.4	6.2	7.7	8.8	144.3
Average snowy days	0	0.2	0	0	0	0	0	0	0	0	0	0.1	0.3
Average relative humidity (%)	73	75	76	75	77	80	73	75	72	67	70	70	74
Mean monthly sunshine hours	91.4	82.3	96.7	112.8	119.5	132	215.6	182.4	145.1	142.2	105.3	101.8	1,527.1
Percentage possible sunshine	27	26	26	29	29	32	51	45	40	40	33	31	34
Source 1: China Meteorological Administration All-time May high All-time October high
Source 2: China Meteorological Administration / NOAA

See or edit raw graph data.

== Administrative divisions ==
Historical population
Year	Pop.	±%
2000	6,386,013	—
2010	7,115,370	+11.4%
2020	8,291,268	+16.5%
Population size may be affected by changes on administrative divisions.

The administrative divisions of Fuzhou have been changed frequently throughout history. From 1983, the Fuzhou current administrative divisions were formed officially, namely, 5 districts and 8 counties. In 1990 and 1994, Fuqing (Foochow Romanized: Hók-chiăng) and Changle (Foochow Romanized: Diòng-lŏ̤h) counties were promoted to county-level cities; Changle became a district in 2017. Despite these changes, the administrative image of "5 districts and 8 counties" is still held popularly among local residents. Fuzhou's entire area only covers 9.65 percent of Fujian Province.

The city of Fuzhou has direct jurisdiction over 6 districts, 1 county-level city, and 6 counties:

Map
Name	Chinese (S)	Hanyu Pinyin	Foochow Romanized	Population (2020 census)	Area (km^{2})	Density (/km^{2})
City proper				4,094,491	1,015.07	4033.70
Gulou District	鼓楼区	Gǔlóu Qū	Gū-làu-kṳ̆	669,090	36.60	18,281
Taijiang District	台江区	Táijiāng Qū	Dài-gĕ̤ng-kṳ̆	411,819	18.28	22,528
Cangshan District	仓山区	Cāngshān Qū	Chŏng-săng-kṳ̆	1,142,991	139.41	8,199
Mawei District	马尾区	Mǎwěi Qū	Mā-muōi-kṳ̆	290,554	254.33	1142
Jin'an District	晋安区	Jìn'ān Qū	Céng-ăng-kṳ̆	789,775	566.45	1,394
Changle District	长乐区	Chánglè Qū	Diòng-lŏ̤h-kṳ̆	790,262	717.54	1101
Suburban and Rural
Minhou County	闽侯县	Mǐnhòu Xiàn	Mìng-âu-gâing	988,200	2,133.03	463
Lianjiang County	连江县	Liánjiāng Xiàn	Lièng-gŏng-gâing	639,498	1,190.67	537
Luoyuan County	罗源县	Luóyuán Xiàn	Lò̤-nguòng-gâing	255,214	1,081.17	236
Minqing County	闽清县	Mǐnqīng Xiàn	Mìng-chiăng-gâing	256,181	1,468.90	174
Yongtai County	永泰县	Yǒngtài Xiàn	Īng-tái-gâing	281,216	2,243.41	125
Pingtan County	平潭县	Píngtán Xiàn	Bìng-tàng-gâing	385,981	371.09	1040
Satellite cities
Fuqing	福清市	Fúqīng Shì	Hók-chiăng-chê	1,390,487	1,932.43	720
Total				8,291,268	12,153.31	682.22

== Culture ==
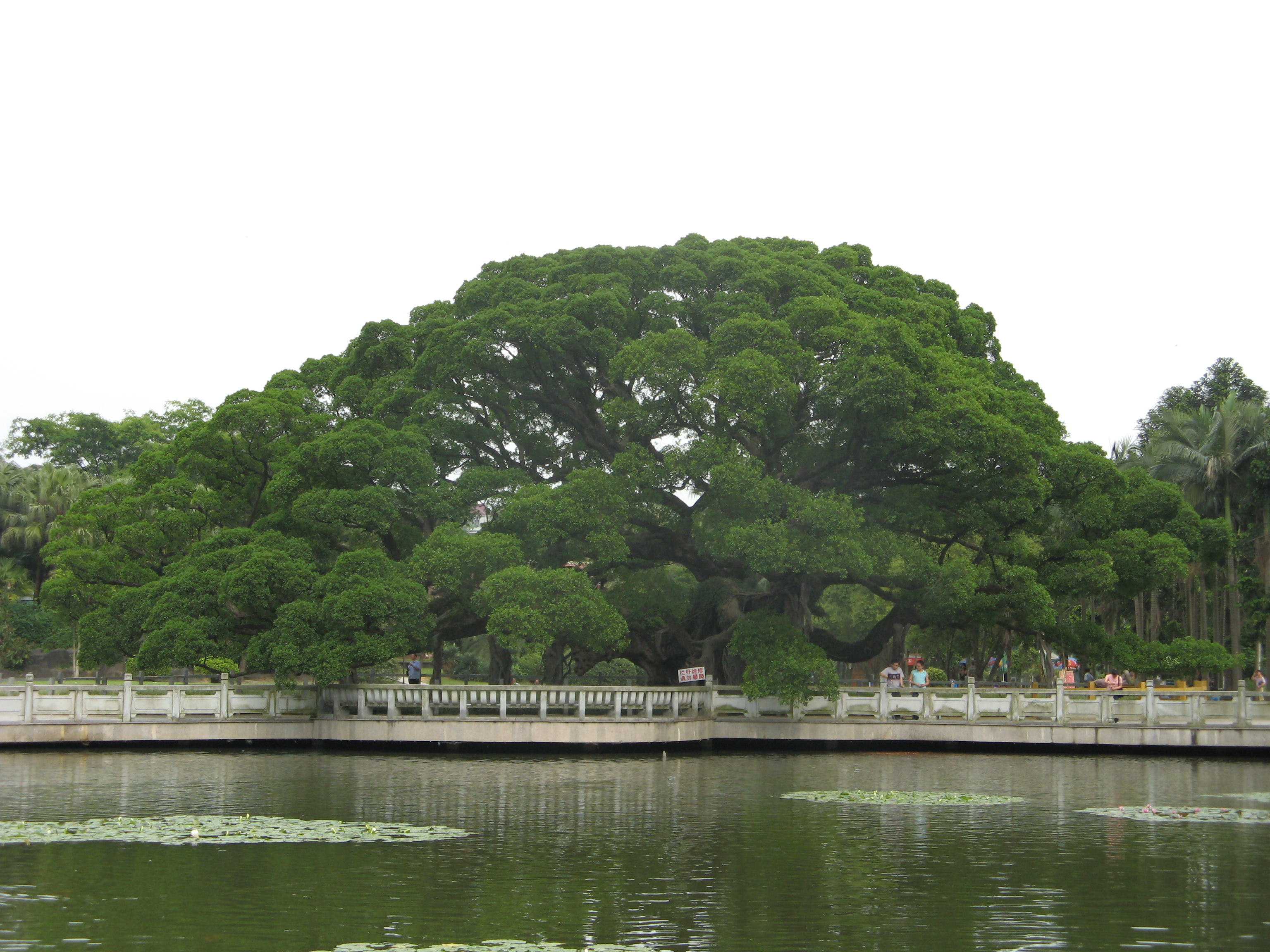
"Banyan King" in Fuzhou National Forest Park (福州國家森林公園).

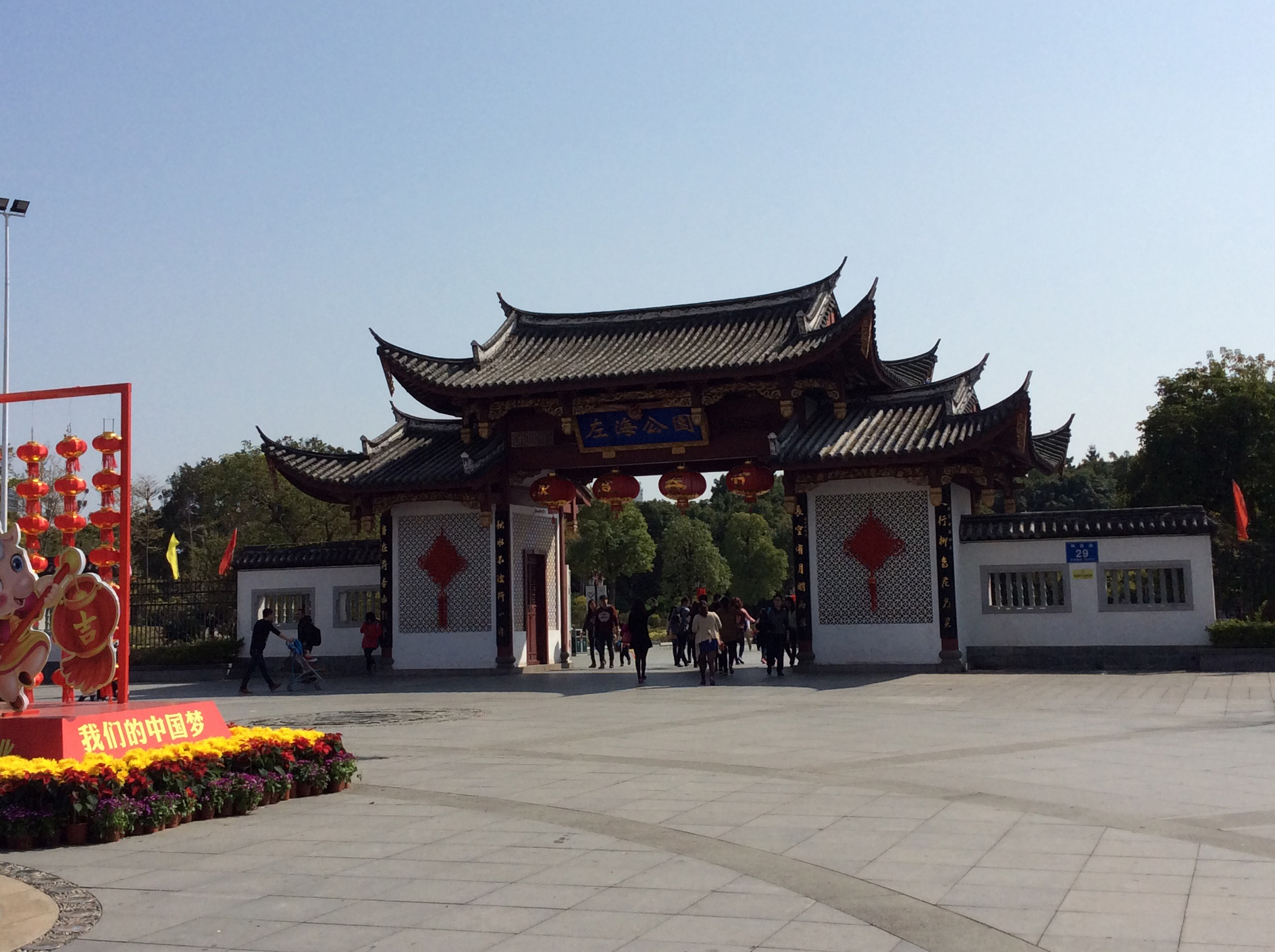
Traditional Fuzhounese architecture

The culture of Fuzhou is distinct from the mainstream inland cultures of central China, and in details vary from other areas of the Chinese coast.

=== Language and art ===
Besides Mandarin Chinese, the majority local residents of Fuzhou (Fuzhou people) also speak Fuzhounese (福州話), the prestige form of Eastern Min.

Min opera, also known as Fuzhou drama, is one of the major operas in Fujian Province. It enjoys popularity in the Fuzhou area and in neighboring parts of Fujian such as the northeast and northwest areas where the Fuzhou language is spoken, as well as in Taiwan and the Malay Archipelago. It became a fixed opera in the early 20th century. There are more than 1,000 plays of Min opera, most of which originate from folk tales, historical novels, or ancient legends, including such traditional plays as "Making Seal", "The Purple Jade Hairpin" and "Switching Fairy Peach with Litchi".

=== Religion ===
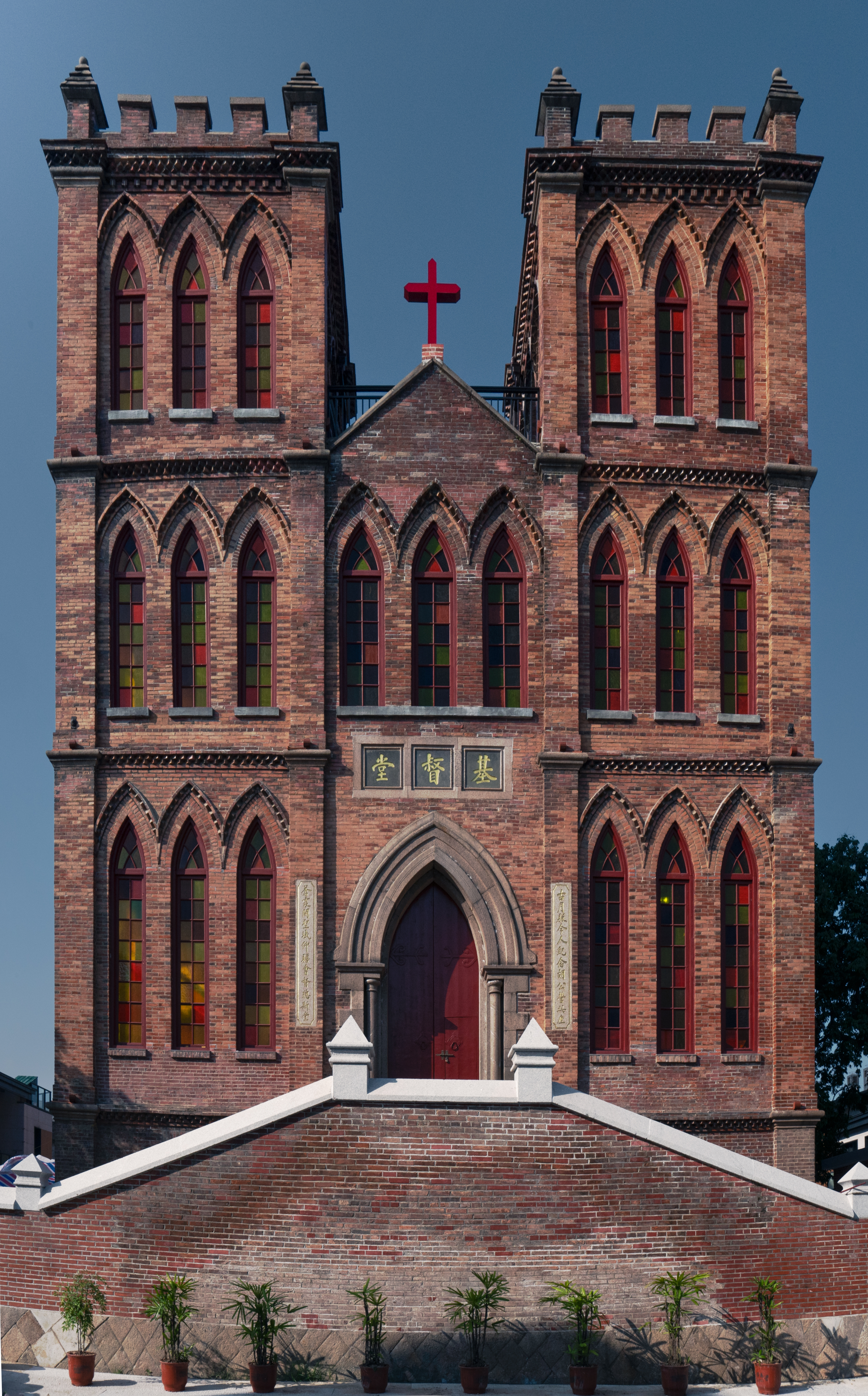
Christ Church in Fuzhou used to be the cathedral of the Diocese of Fukien within the Anglican Church in China before the PRC.

The two traditional mainstream religions practiced in Fuzhou are Mahayana Buddhism and Taoism. Traditionally, many people practice both religions simultaneously. The city is also home to many Buddhist monasteries, Taoist temples and Buddhist monks.

Apart from mainstream religions, a number of religious worship sites of various local religions are situated in the streets and lanes of Fuzhou.

The origins of local religion can be dated back centuries. These diverse religions incorporated elements such as gods and doctrines from other religions and cultures, such as totem worship and traditional legends. For example, Monkey King, originated to monkey worship among local ancients, gradually came to embody the God of Wealth in Fuzhou after the novel Journey to the West was issued in Ming dynasty.

As the most popular religion in the Min River Valley, the worship of Lady Linshui is viewed as one of the three most influential local religions in Fujian, the other two being the worship of Mazu and Baosheng Dadi (保生大帝).

=== Local cuisine ===
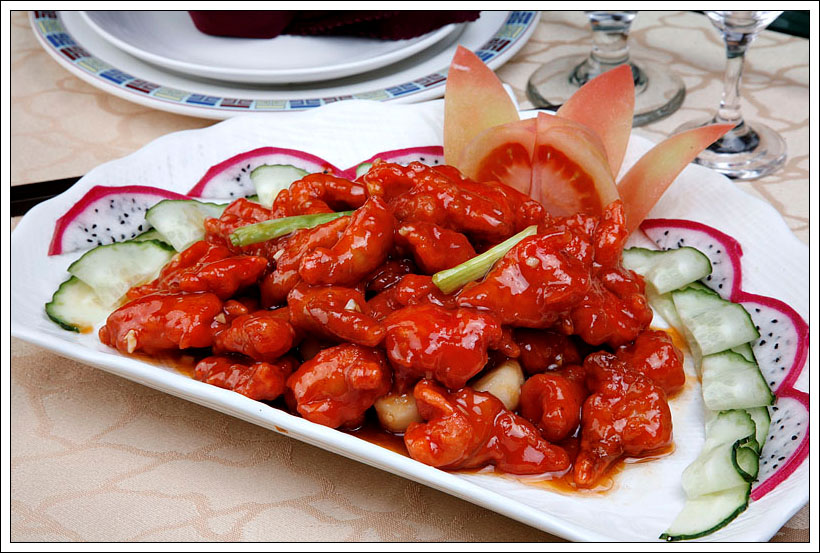
Fuzhou's local dish Litchi Pork (荔枝肉), famous for its sweet and sour flavor

Fuzhou cuisine is most notably one of the four traditional cooking styles of Fujian cuisine, which in turn is one of the eight Chinese regional cuisines. Dishes are light but flavorful, with particular emphasis on umami taste, known in Chinese cooking as xianwei (simplified Chinese: 鲜味; traditional Chinese: 鮮味; pinyin: xiānwèi), as well as retaining the original flavor of the main ingredients instead of masking them. In Fuzhou cuisine, the taste is light compared to that of some other Chinese cooking styles, and often have a mixed sweet and sour taste. Soup, served as an indispensable dish in meals, is cooked in various ways with local seasonal fresh vegetables and seafood and often added with local cooking wine (福建老酒).

Fuzhou is famous for its street food and snacks. Some notable street food dishes include Fuzhou fish balls (魚丸), meat-pastry dumplings (扁肉燕), oyster cake (海蛎饼), rice scroll soup (鼎邊糊), guong bian (光餅; a kind of mildly savory pastry), Buddha Jumps over the Wall (佛跳墙), and pork floss (肉鬆). Many of these street food dishes have a long history and their own local legend; an example would be the oyster cake, according Fuzhou local folklore, in the early Qing dynasty, there was a young man who inherited his father's dim sum business, despite all his hard work, he only managed to earn enough money to feed himself, not enough to raise and feed a family of his own. One night, he dreamt of a silver-haired elderly man, who told him that he has very good fortune, the young man then asked him what he can do to obtain good luck, the elderly man then floated away. That's when the young man notice the setting moon, and after the moon sank under the clouds, rose from the east a golden sun, he was inspired by the dream and invented oyster cake, which is white like the moon before being lowered into hot grease and coming out golden as the morning sun. According to the legend, after the young man made a fortune out of his invention and his oyster cake was imitated by many others, which was passed down till this day. another example of a Fuzhou street food with a long history is rice scroll soup, which became popular in Fuzhou in the early part of the Qing dynasty. As more Fuzhou residents settled overseas, Fuzhou dishes spread to Taiwan, Southeast Asia and the U.S.. For example, one is able to find guong bian and Fuzhou fish balls in Sitiawan in Ipoh, Malaysia while Fuzhou fish balls, meat-pastry dumplings and rice scroll soup can be found in New York's Chinatown. Fuzhou cuisine has also spread internationally through migration, particularly to Southeast Asia and the United States. Dishes such as fish balls, meat-pastry dumplings, and oyster cake are now common in Fujianese communities abroad, including in New York City's Chinatown and in Malaysian cities such as Sitiawan and Ipoh. These dishes are regarded by overseas Fuzhounese as symbols of cultural identity and continuity.

Fuzhou residents also enjoy eating festival foods during traditional Chinese holidays. For example, red and white rice cakes (年糕) are served over Chinese New Year, tangyuan (汤圆) during the Lantern Festival, zongzi (粽子) during the Dragon Boat Festival, and sweet soy bean powder-covered plain yuanxiao over the winter solstice.

Olive juice, or ganlanzhi (橄榄汁), is also a much sought-after refreshment that is cloudy and light yellowish-green in color. Olive trees grown on the Canarium album tree in Fuzhou since the Tang dynasty, it was even approved as a trademark with geographic indication by China in 2010. Not found elsewhere in China, olive juice is also a reminder of the many regional differences in China when it comes to food.

=== Special crafts ===
Bodiless lacquerware (脫胎漆器), paper umbrellas and horn combs (角梳) are the "Three Treasures" of Fuzhou traditional arts. In addition, bodiless lacquerware, together with cork pictures (軟木畫) and Shoushan stone sculptures (壽山石雕) are called "Three Superexcellences" of Fuzhou.

== Media ==
Fuzhou Evening News (福州晚报), Strait Metropolitan Post and Southeast Express (东南快报) are the three most primary newspapers in the city. Fuzhou Daily (福州日报) is the official newspaper of the Fuzhou Committee of Chinese Communist Party. FZTV, the local municipal television station has four channels. As the capital, the provincial state-owned Fujian Media Group, Fujian Daily Newspaper Group and Straits Publishing & Distributing Group also headquarter here.

== Transportation ==
=== Airports ===
The city is served by Fuzhou Changle International Airport, which replaces Fuzhou Yixu Airport, the old airfield. The former is its main international airport and an air-hub in southeast China, while the latter was turned into a PLA airbase after 1997.

=== Railways ===
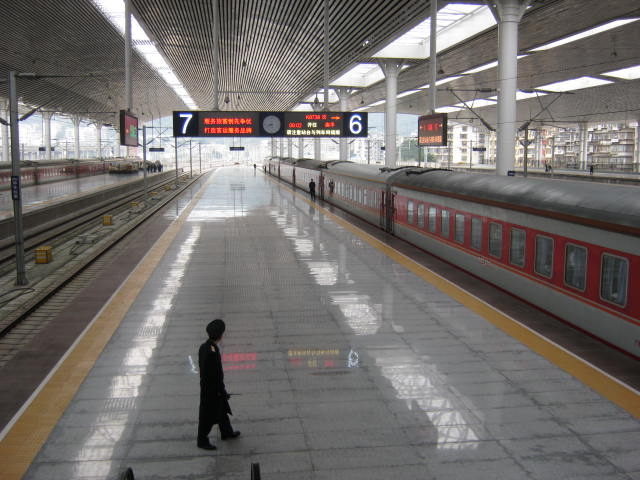
Fuzhou Railway Station

Fuzhou is a railway hub in northern Fujian. The Wenzhou–Fuzhou and Fuzhou–Xiamen Railways form part of the Southeast Coast High-Speed Rail Corridor and can accommodate high-speed trains at speeds of up to 250 km/h (155 mph). The Hefei–Fuzhou High-Speed Railway links the city to Beijing through its nearby inner land province Jiangxi at speeds up to 350 km/h (220 mph). The Nanping–Fuzhou Railway and Xiangtang–Putian Railway provide rail access inland. The latter line can carry trains at speeds of 200 km/h (124 mph). The regional Fuzhou-Mawei Cargo Railway runs from the Fuzhou Railway Station eastward to the port in Mawei District. Fuzhou has two main railway stations, Fuzhou and Fuzhou South. Fuzhou station is often just referred to as Fuzhou station given its central location.

=== Metro ===
Fuzhou Metro is the first rapid transit system in Fujian province. It has five metro lines in operation.

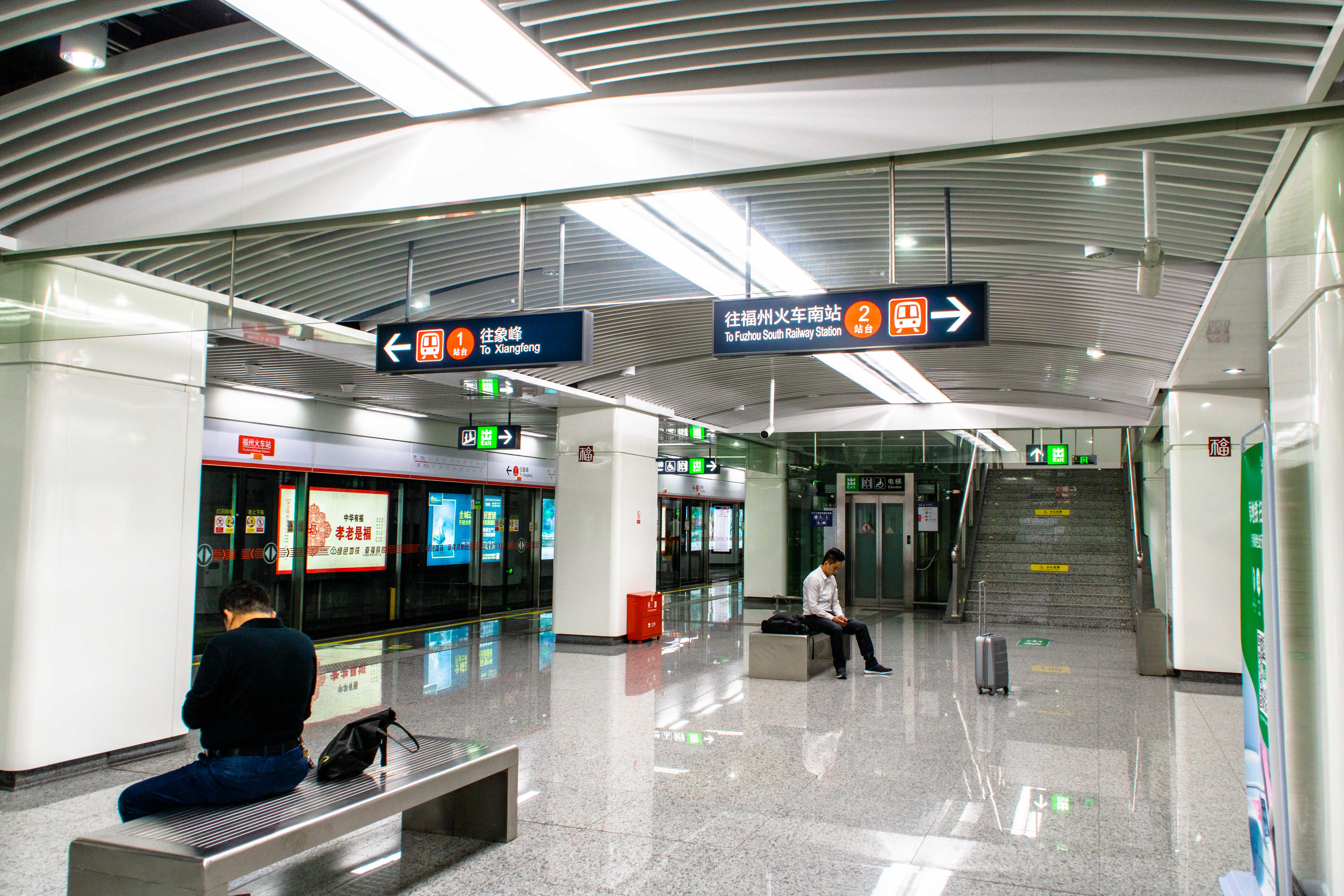
Platform of Fuzhou Railway Station (Fuzhou Metro)

Line 1 links the two railway stations of the city. The Fuzhou railway station is located north of the city center, near the North Second Ring Road. Fuzhou South Railway Station, located in Cangshan district, is a key landmark of the New City development scheme, begun in 2007 and completed in 2010. Line 1 was opened on May 18, 2016, while Line 5, which runs from the northeast of the city to Fuzhou South, was completed in stages during 2022–2023.

Line 2 runs in the east–west direction of the city, linking the university city and Fuzhou High-Tech Zone in Minhou county, Jinshan Industrial Zone in Cangshan district, and Gushan mountain in Jin'an district. Line 2 was opened on 26 April 2019. Line 4 runs from the north of the city to Difengjian in the south, near the bank of the Min River, the latter being crossed by Line 6 which connects the central areas of the city with Yingqian and Wanshou areas to the south.

=== Seaport ===
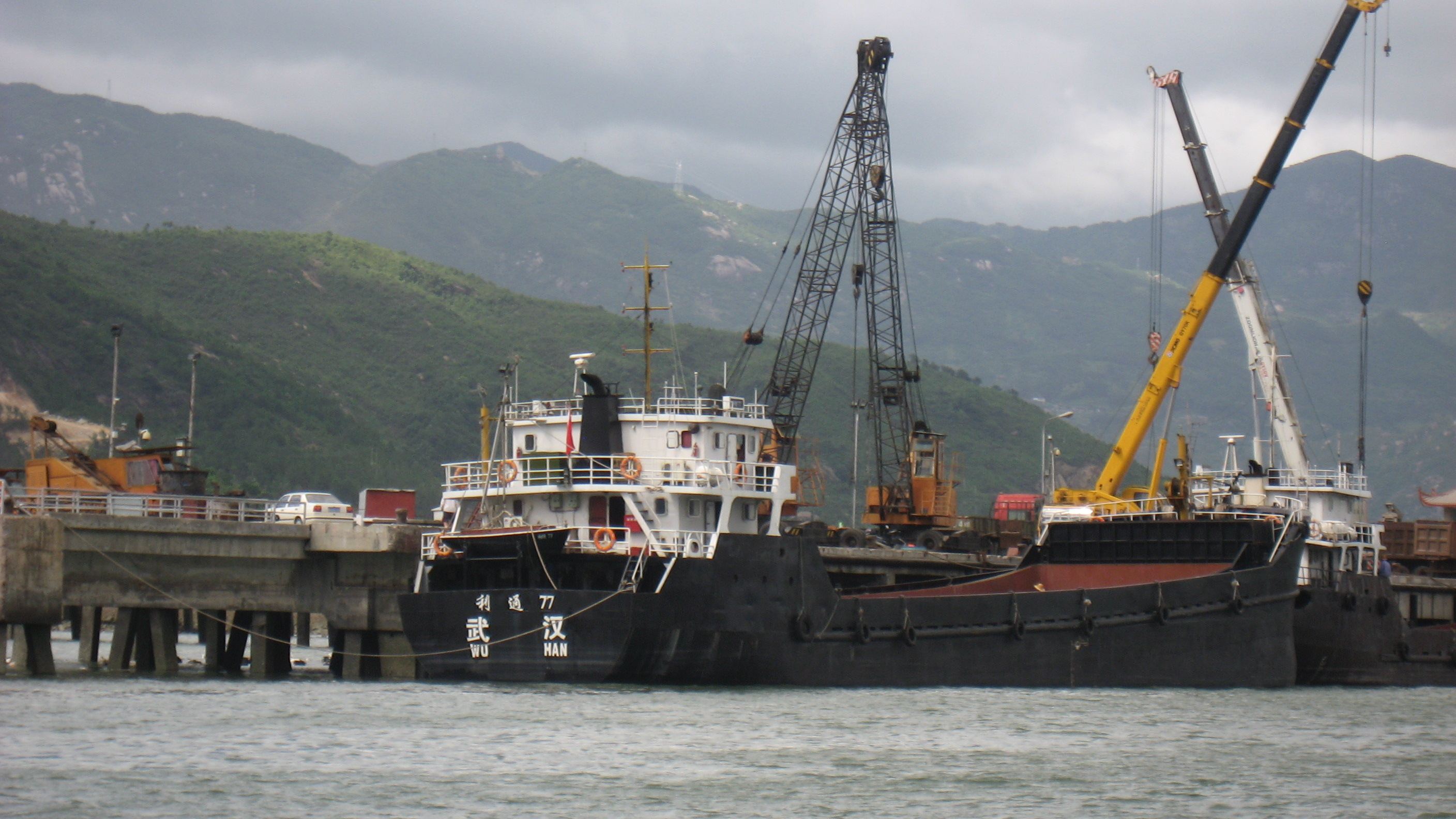
The dock in Luoyuan Bay, Fuzhou. The construction of a new industrial park is still in progress.

Passenger liners regularly sail between ROC's Matsu Islands and the port in Mawei District.

A high-speed ferry sails across Taiwan Strait between the port in Pingtan County, the mainland's closest point to Taiwan, to Taipei and Taichung, a trip that takes about 3 hours.

==== History of Fuzhou port ====
In 1867 the Fuzhou seaport was the site of one of China's first major experiments with Western technology, when the Fuzhou Navy Yard was established. A shipyard and an arsenal were built under French guidance and a naval school was opened. A naval academy was also established at the shipyard, and it became a center for the study of European languages and technical sciences. The academy, which offered courses in English, French, engineering, and navigation, produced a generation of Western-trained officers, including the famous scholar-reformer Yan Fu (1854–1921).

The yard was established as part of a program to strengthen China in the wake of the country's disastrous defeat in the Second Opium War (1856–1860). Most talented students nonetheless continued to pursue a traditional Confucian education, and by the mid-1870s the government began to lose interest in the shipyard, which had trouble securing funds and declined in importance. Fuzhou remained essentially a commercial center and a port until World War II; it had relatively little industry. The port was occupied by the Japanese during 1940–1945.

Since 1949, Fuzhou has grown considerably. Transportation has been improved by the dredging of the Min River for navigation by medium-sized craft upstream to Nanping. In 1956 the railway linking Fuzhou with the interior of the province and with the main Chinese railway system began operation. The port has also been improved; Fuzhou itself is no longer accessible to seagoing ships, but Luoxingta anchorage and the outer harbor at Guantou on the coast of the East China Sea have been modernized and improved. The chief exports are timber, fruits, paper, and foodstuffs.

== Economy ==
Fuzhou's GDP (Nominal) trend
Year	GDP (billions of CN¥)	Growth (%)
2005	172.000	9.8
2006	165.694	12.2
2007	197.459	15.1
2008	228.416	13.0
2009	252.428	12.8
2010	306.821	14.0
2011	373.478	13.0

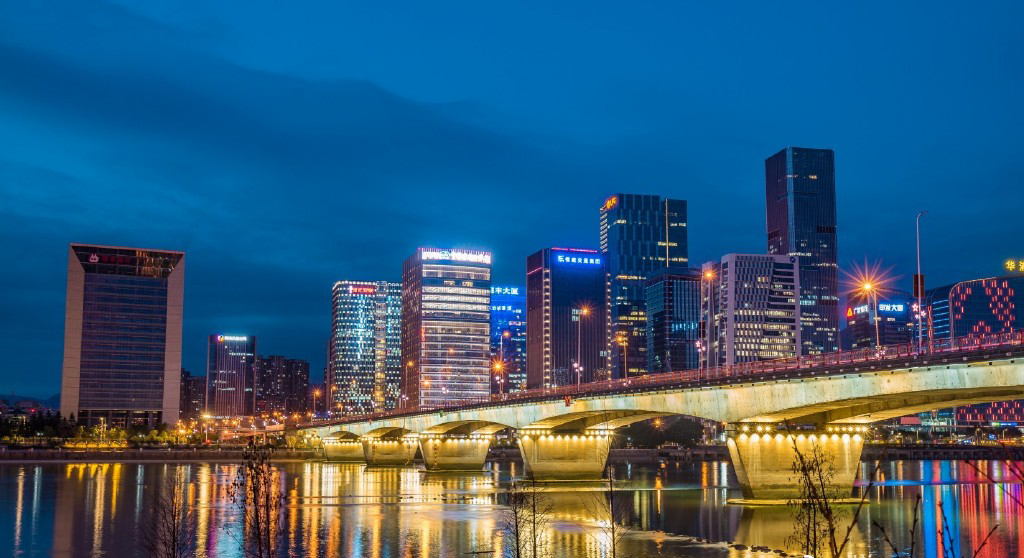
Taijiang District (Financial District) of Fuzhou.

Industry is supplied with power by a grid running from the Gutian hydroelectric scheme in the mountains to the northwest. The city is a center for commercial banking, designer brands and timber-working, engineering, papermaking, printing, and textile industries. A small iron and steel plant was built in 1958. In 1984 Fuzhou was designated one of China's "open" cities in the new open-door policy inviting foreign investments. Handicrafts remain important in the rural areas, and the city is famous for its lacquer and wood products.

Its GDP was ¥75,614 (c. US$12,140) per capita in 2015, ranked no. 52 among 659 Chinese cities.

Fuzhou is undoubtedly the province's political, economic and cultural center as well as an industrial center and seaport on the Min River. In 2008, Fuzhou's GDP amounted to ¥228.4 billion, an increase of 13 percent.

Manufactured products include chemicals, silk and cotton textiles, iron and steel, and processed food. Among Fuzhou's exports are fine lacquerware and handcrafted fans and umbrellas. The city's trade is mainly with Chinese coastal ports. Its exports of timber, food products, and paper move through the harbor at Guantou located about 50 kilometres (31 mi) downstream.

In 2008, exports reached US$13.6 billion, a growth of 10.4 percent while imports amounted to US$6.8 billion. Total retail sales for the same period came to ¥113.4 billion and per capita GDP grew to ¥33,615. During the same period, Fuzhou approved 155 foreign-invested projects. Contracted foreign investment amounted to US$1.489 billion, while utilized foreign investment increased by 43 percent to US$1.002 billion.

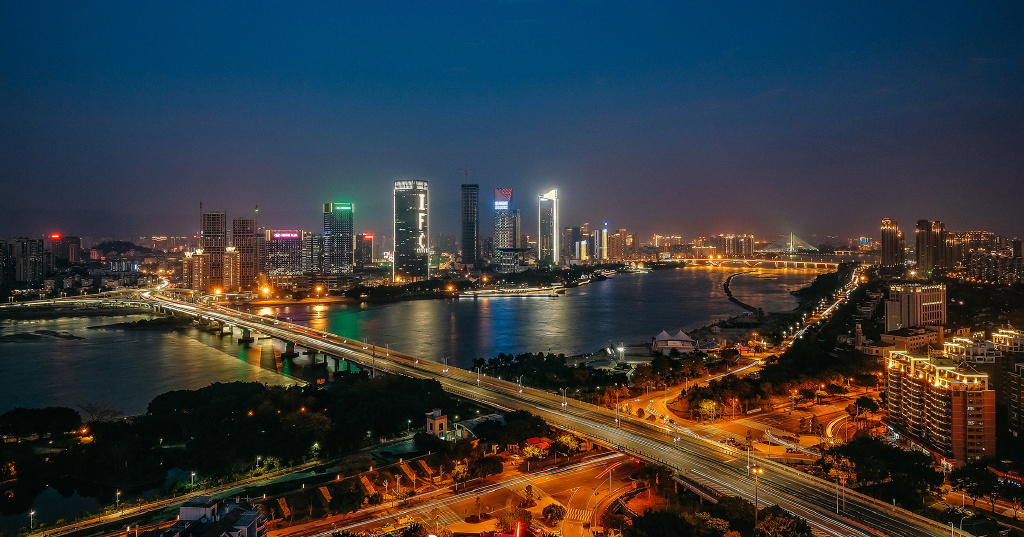
Taixi Central Business District

=== Economic and technological zones ===
==== Fuzhou Economic & Technological Development Zone ====
The Fuzhou Economic & Technological Development Zone was established in January 1985 by the State Council, with a total planning area of 22 square kilometres (8.5 sq mi) and now has 10.1 square kilometres (3.9 sq mi) built. It is located close to Fuzhou Changle International Airport and Fuzhou Port. Industries encouraged in the zone include electronics assembly and manufacturing, telecommunications equipment, trading and distribution, automobile production/assembly, medical equipment and supplies, shipping/warehousing/logistics, and heavy industry.

==== Fuzhou Export Processing Zone ====
The Fuzhou Export Processing Zone was founded on June 3, 2005, with the approval of the State Council and enjoys all the preferential policies. It is located inside the Chang'an Investment Zone of the Fuzhou Economic and Technical Development Zone (FETDZ) with a planned land area of 1.14 square kilometres (0.44 sq mi).

==== Fuzhou Free Trade Zone ====
The Fuzhou Free Trade Zone was established in 1992 by the State Council, with a planning area of 1.8 square kilometres (0.69 sq mi). Industries encouraged in the free trade zone include electronics assembly and manufacturing, heavy industry, instruments and industrial equipment production, shipping/warehousing/logistics, telecommunications equipment, trading, and distribution.

==== Fuzhou High-Tech Industrial Development Zone ====
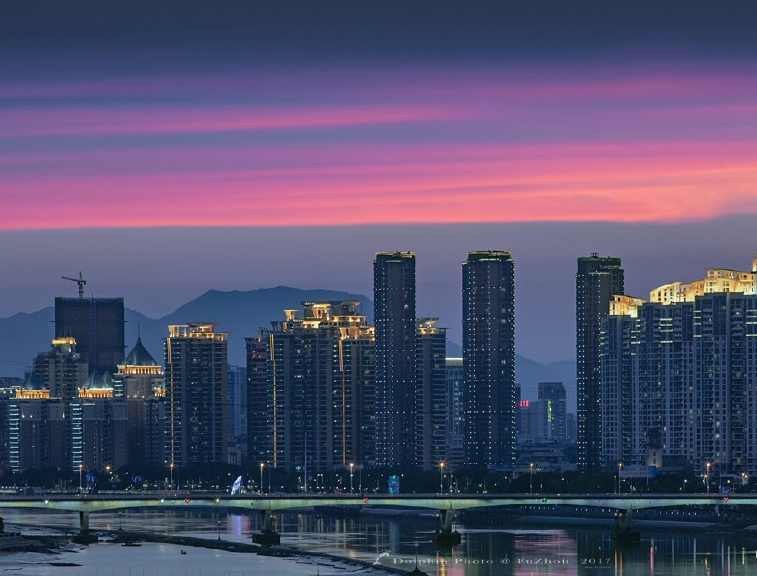
Residential buildings in Fuzhou

Fuzhou High-tech Development Zone was set up in 1988 and approved by the State Council in March 1991. In 1995, the Fuzhou municipal government decided to build Baiyi Electronic Information City, which covers 1.2 square kilometres (0.46 sq mi) in the zone, making it the lead electronic industrial zone in Fuzhou. The Administrative Commission of Mawei High-tech Park was set up in the zone in 1999. It covers an area of 5.6 square kilometres (2.2 sq mi), and is in the area between Gushan Channel and Mawei Channel, Jiangbin Road and Fuma Road.

==== Fuzhou Science and Technology Park ====
The Fuzhou Science and Technology Park was established in 1988 and was approved to be a national-level zone by the State Council in 1991. The planned area is 5.5 square kilometres (2.1 sq mi) and is divided into 3 parts: the Mawei portion, the Cangshan portion, and the Hongshan portion. The main industries are electronics, information technology, and biotechnology. The zone is 7 kilometres (4.3 mi) away from the China National Highway 316 and 41 kilometres (25 mi) away from the Fuzhou Changle International Airport.

==== Fuzhou Taiwan Merchant Investment Area ====
The Fuzhou Taiwan Merchants Development Zone was approved to be established in May 1989 by the State Council. The zone is located in the Fuzhou Economic and Technological Development Zone. The zone is a commercial base for Taiwan-related development. The current area is 6 square kilometres (2.3 sq mi). The main industries are IT, metallurgy, food processing, and textiles. The zone is 11.5 kilometres (7.1 mi) away from the 316 National Highway and 52 kilometres (32 mi) away from Fuzhou Changle International Airport.

== Cityscape ==
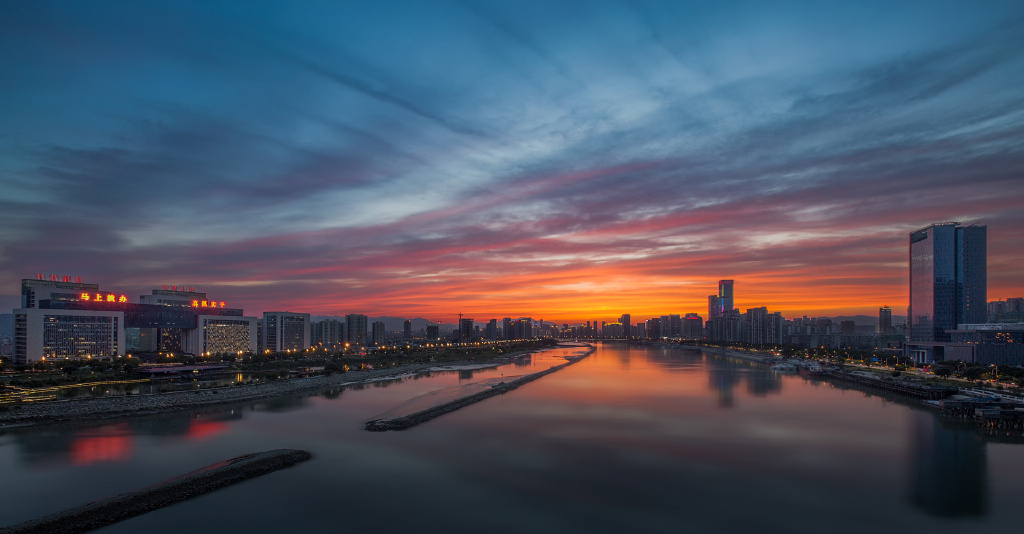
Fuzhou skyline, the city hall is on the left, and the Financial District is on the right.

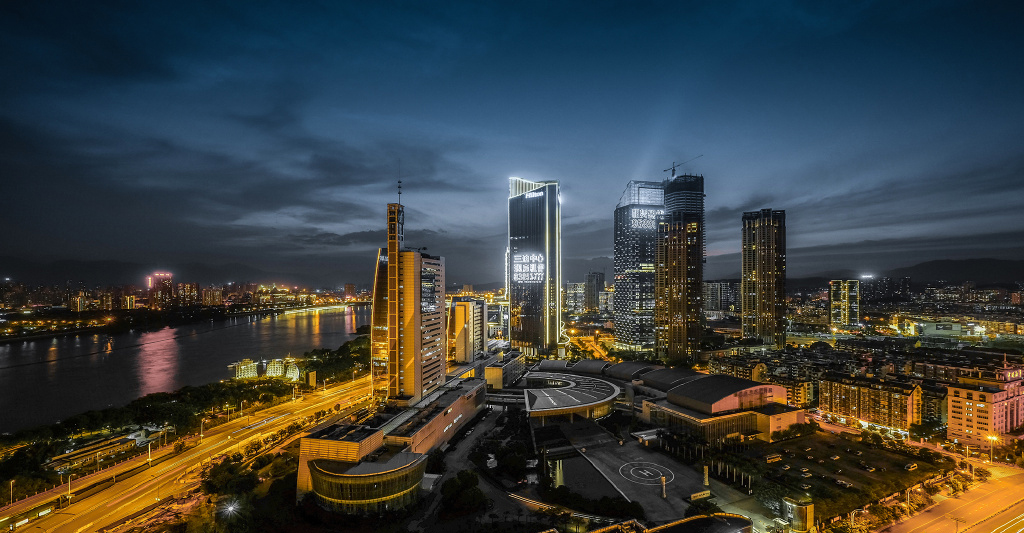
Fuzhou Taixi Central Business District

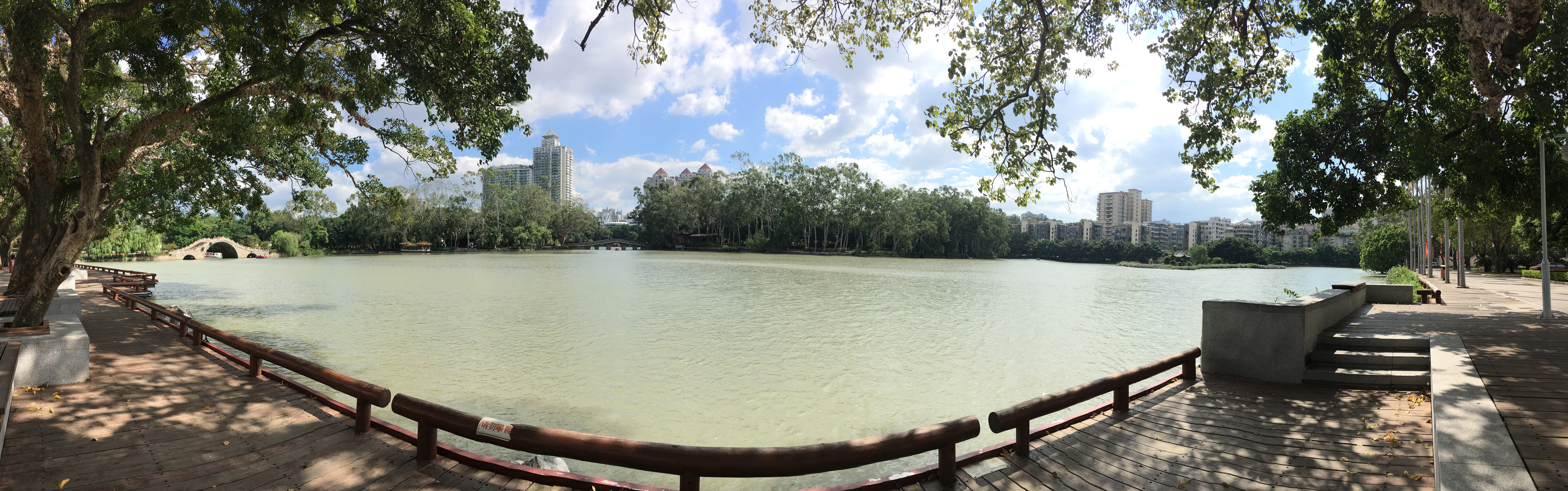
Panorama of West Lake (西湖)

== Tourist attractions ==
=== Cultural ===
Sanfang Qixiang (三坊七巷) "Three Lanes and Seven Alleys" is a cluster of ancient residential buildings dating from the late Jin dynasty now features a pedestrian zone with shops along the street. Situated at the centre of the city at Gulou District, it is the most popular touristic destination in the city. Many buildings were revitalized recently to increase tourism.

- Lin Zexu Memorial Hall (林则徐纪念馆) (Aomen Rd)
- West Lake (福州西湖) (An artificial landscape-style lake built in 282)
- Hualin Temple (华林寺) (Built in 964, Song dynasty) Its main hall is known as the oldest surviving wooden building in south China and was confirmed as an important heritage site under state protection in 1982.
- Dizang Temple (The Temple of Sacrificing Guardian of the Earth, founded in 527)
- Xichan Temple (西禅寺) (Buddhist temple founded in 867)
- Wu Ta (乌塔) "Black Pagoda" (Originally built in 799, rebuilt in 936)
- Bai Ta (白塔) "White Pagoda" (On the top of Mount Yu, originally built in 905, 67 m in height, collapsed in 1534, rebuilt in 1548, 41 m in height)
- Yongquan Temple (涌泉寺) (Founded in 915, and located on the top of Mount Gu)
- Mount Gu (鼓山), the tallest mountain in the area. Attracts many residents, especially in the weekends for hiking trips.
- Mount Qi (旗山) (In Nanyu, Minhou County.)
- Luoxing Tower (罗星塔) (In Mawei District and built in the Song dynasty. Was called "China Tower")
- Tanshishan cultural relics (昙石山文化遗址) (In Ganzhe, Minhou County)
- Saint Dominic's Cathedral (福州圣多明我主教座堂)
- St. John's Church, Fuzhou
- Jinshan Temple (金山寺) (Originally built in 1131–1162, rebuilt in 1934)
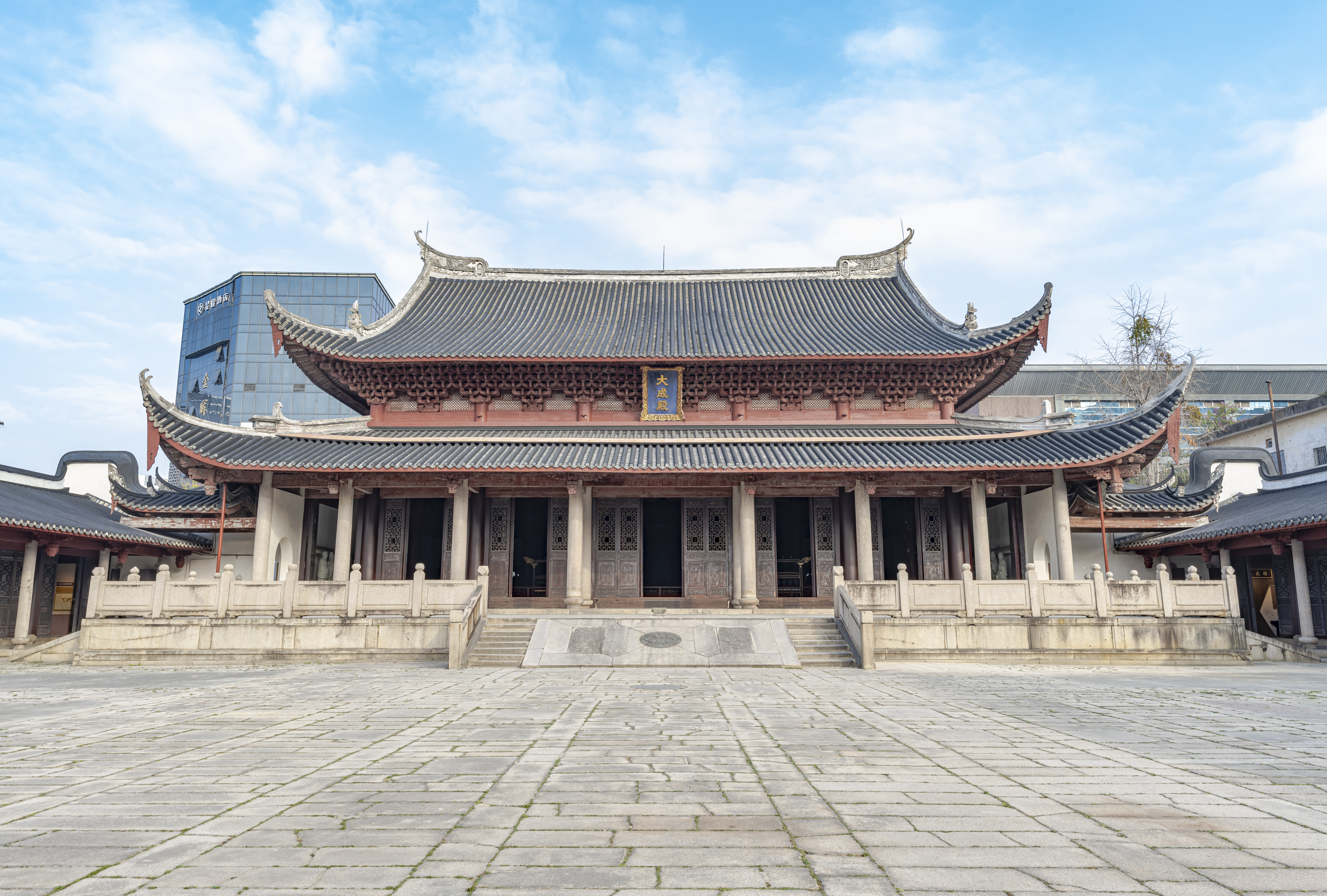
Fuzhou Confucian temple

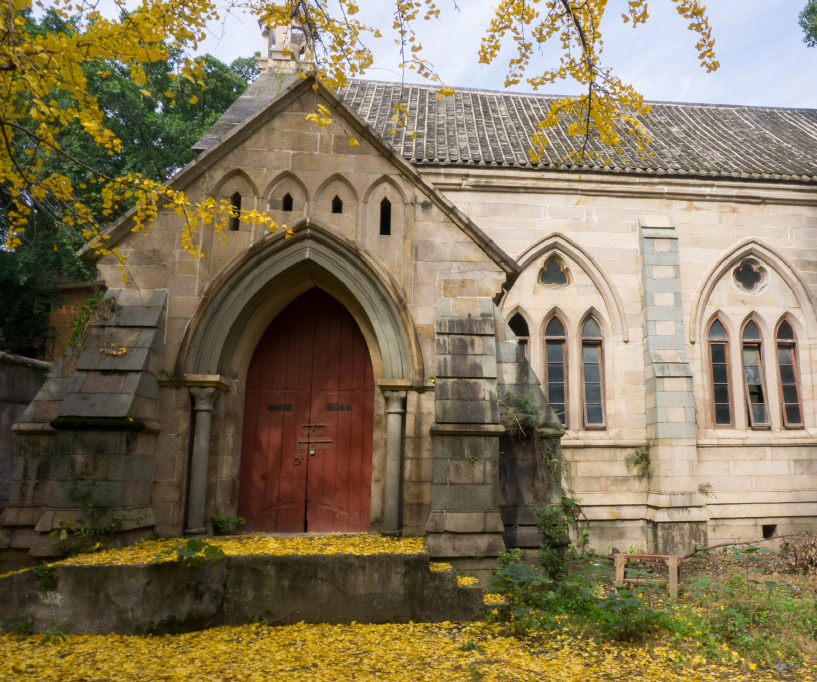
St. John's Church, Fuzhou

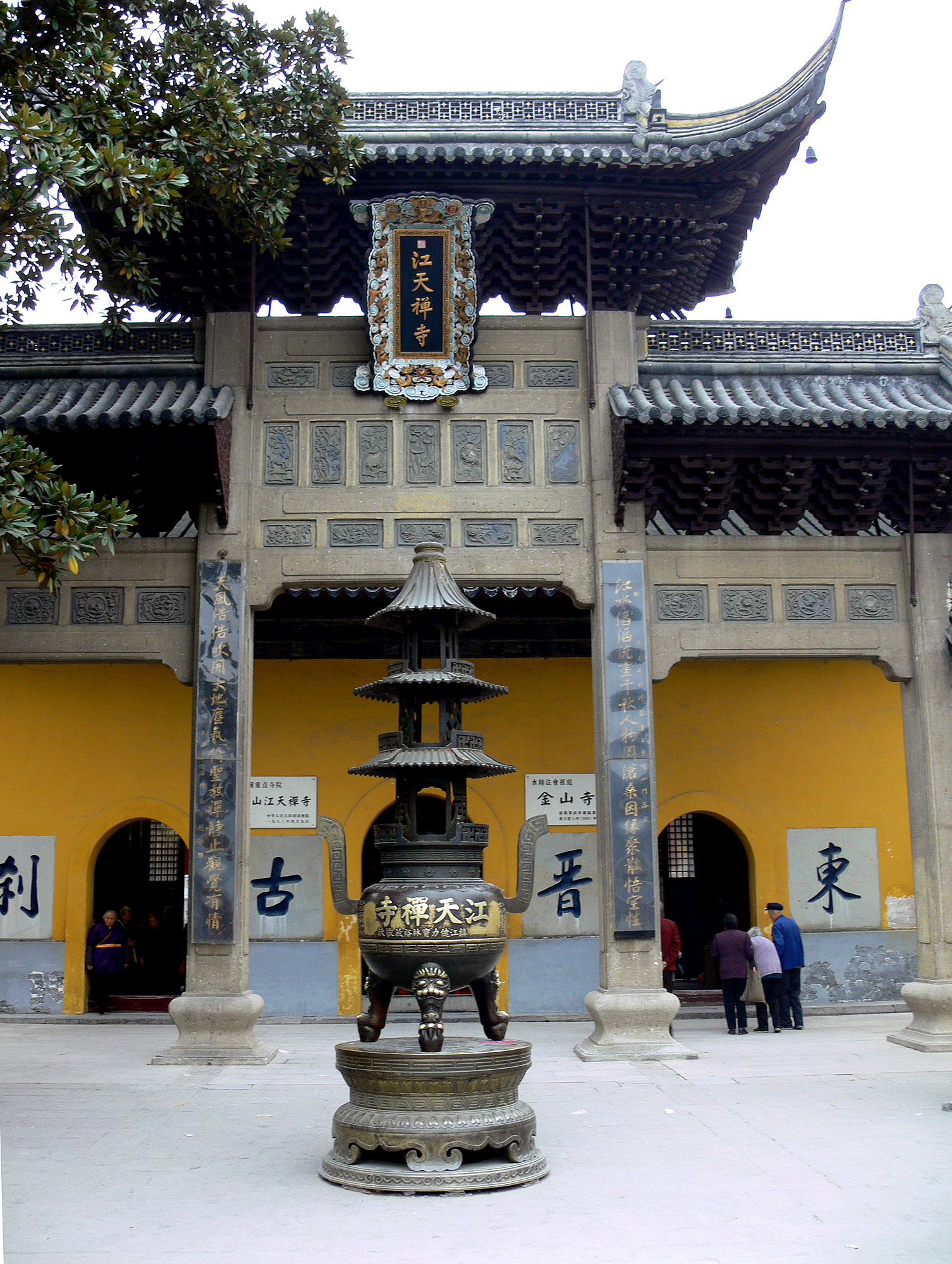
Jinshan Temple

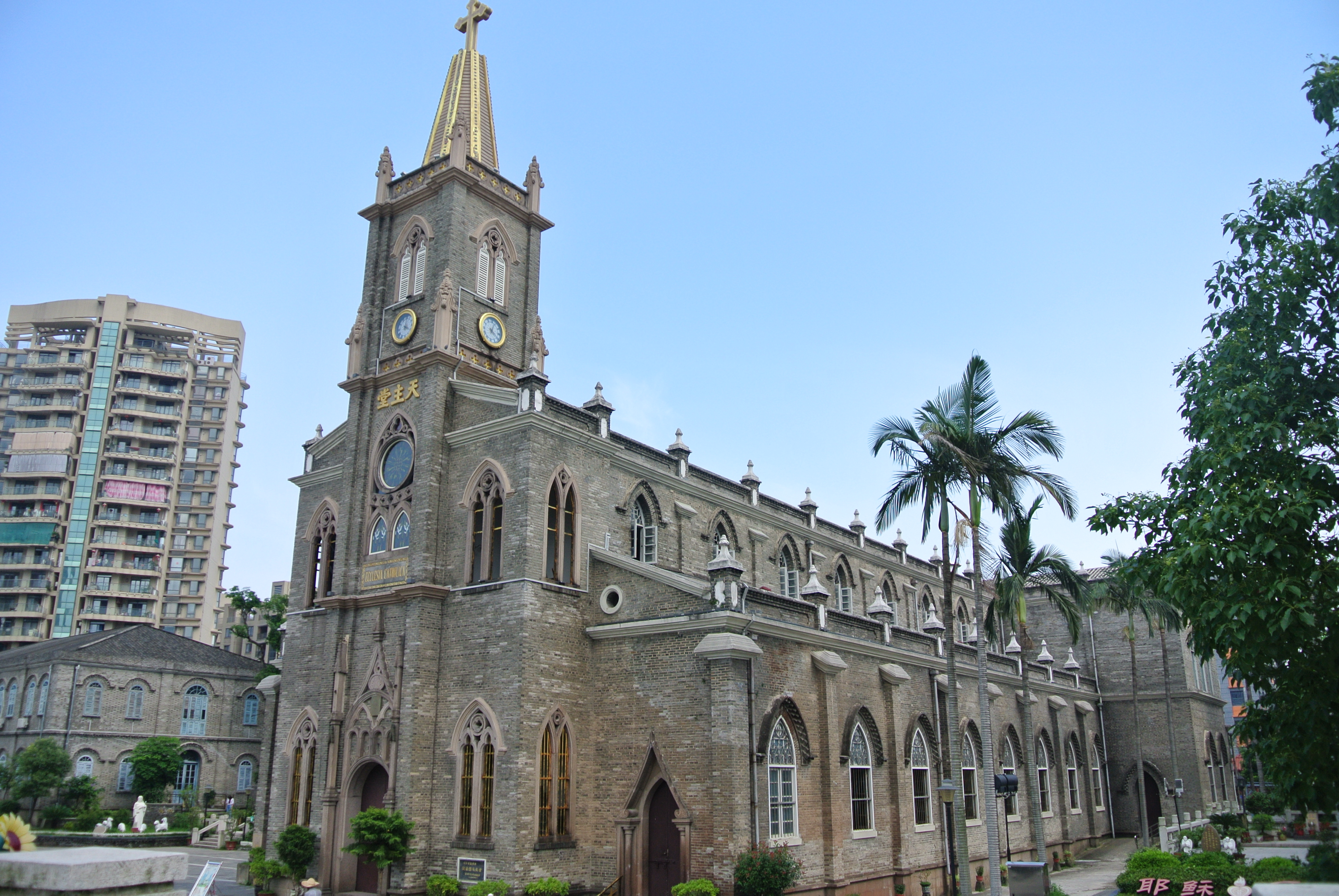
St. Dominic's Cathedral

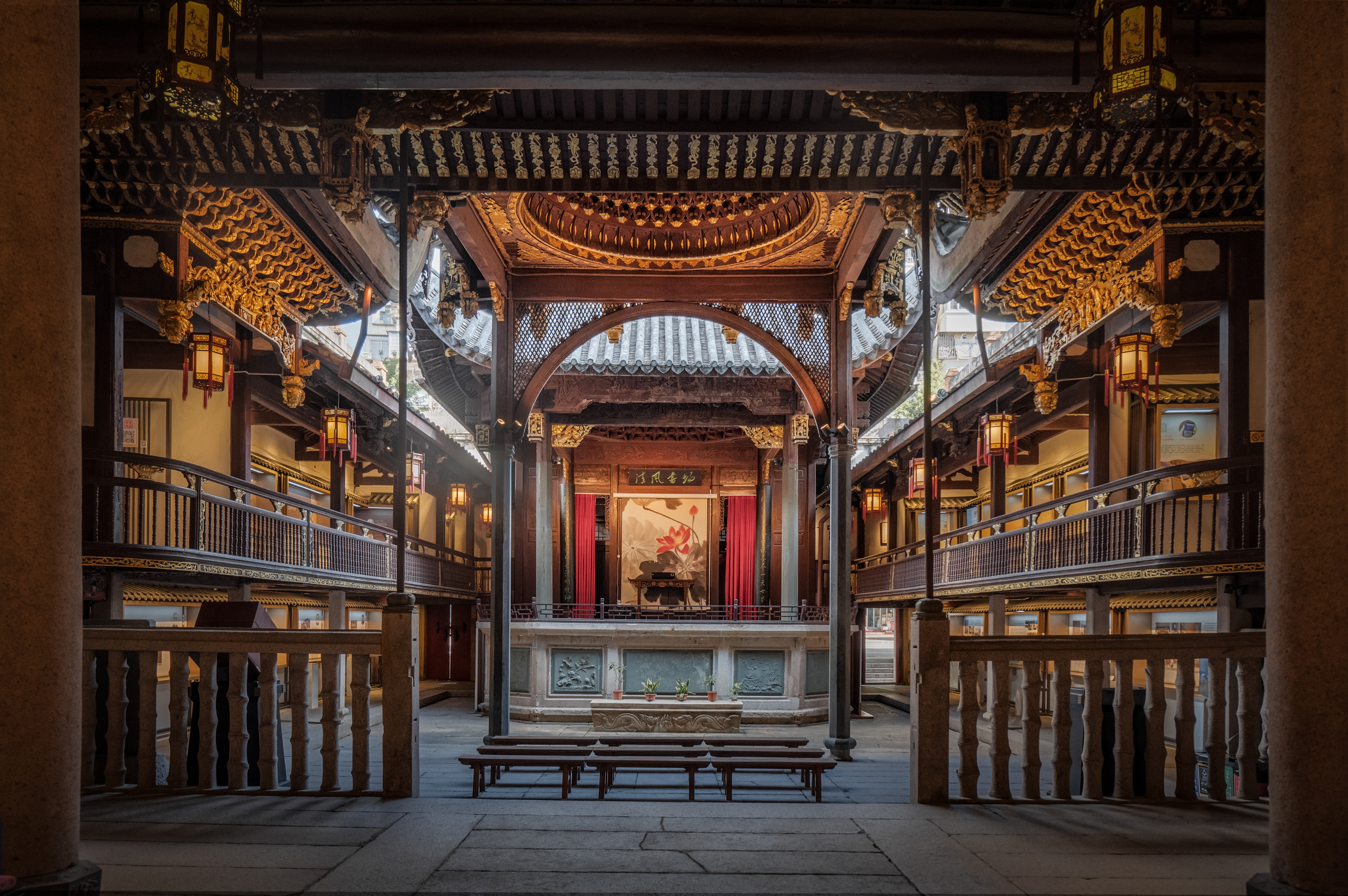
Gutian Guildhall

=== Recreational ===
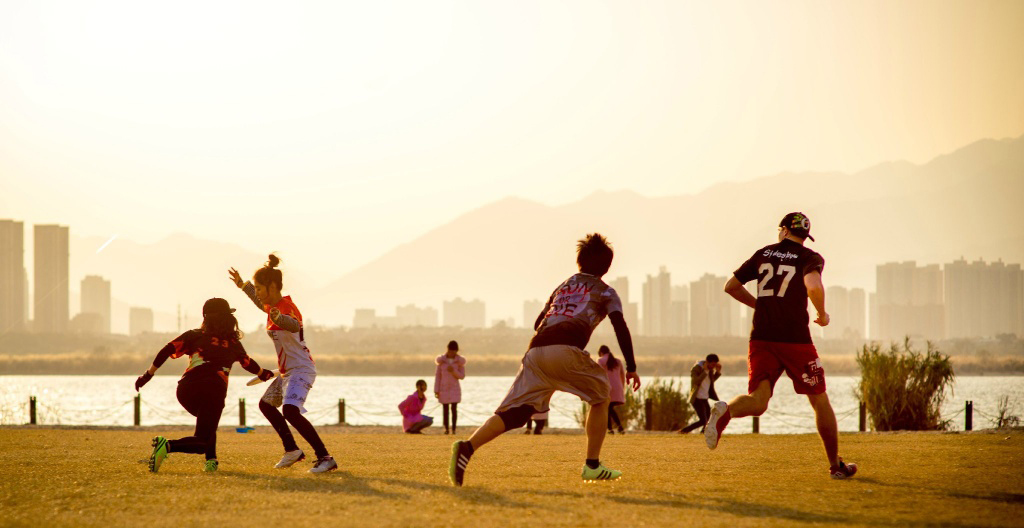
Fuzhou Beach Park

- Fujian Museum (福建省博物院) (Near West Lake)
- Wulongjiang Shidi Park (乌龙江湿地公园) (A wetland park. However, the park is in distress due to ineffective environmental protection and construction)
- Beach Park (沙滩公园)
- Chating Park (茶亭公园)
- Zuohai Park (左海公园)
- Minjiang Park (闽江公园) (On the two banks of the Min River)
- Pingshan Park (屏山公园)
- Mount Jinniu Park (金牛山公园) (Near the Fuzhou West Long-Distance Bus Station)
- Mount Jinji Park (金鸡山公园)
- Fuzhou National Forest Park (福州国家森林公园)
- Sandiejing Forest Park (三叠井森林公园)
- Fuzhou Hot Spring Park (福州温泉公园)
- Fuzhou Zoo (福州动物园) (This new zoo was built in 2008 after moving from its old location by West Lake)

== Education ==
Fuzhou is also a major city for scientific research, appearing in the global top 50 cities as tracked by the Nature Index.

=== Colleges and universities ===
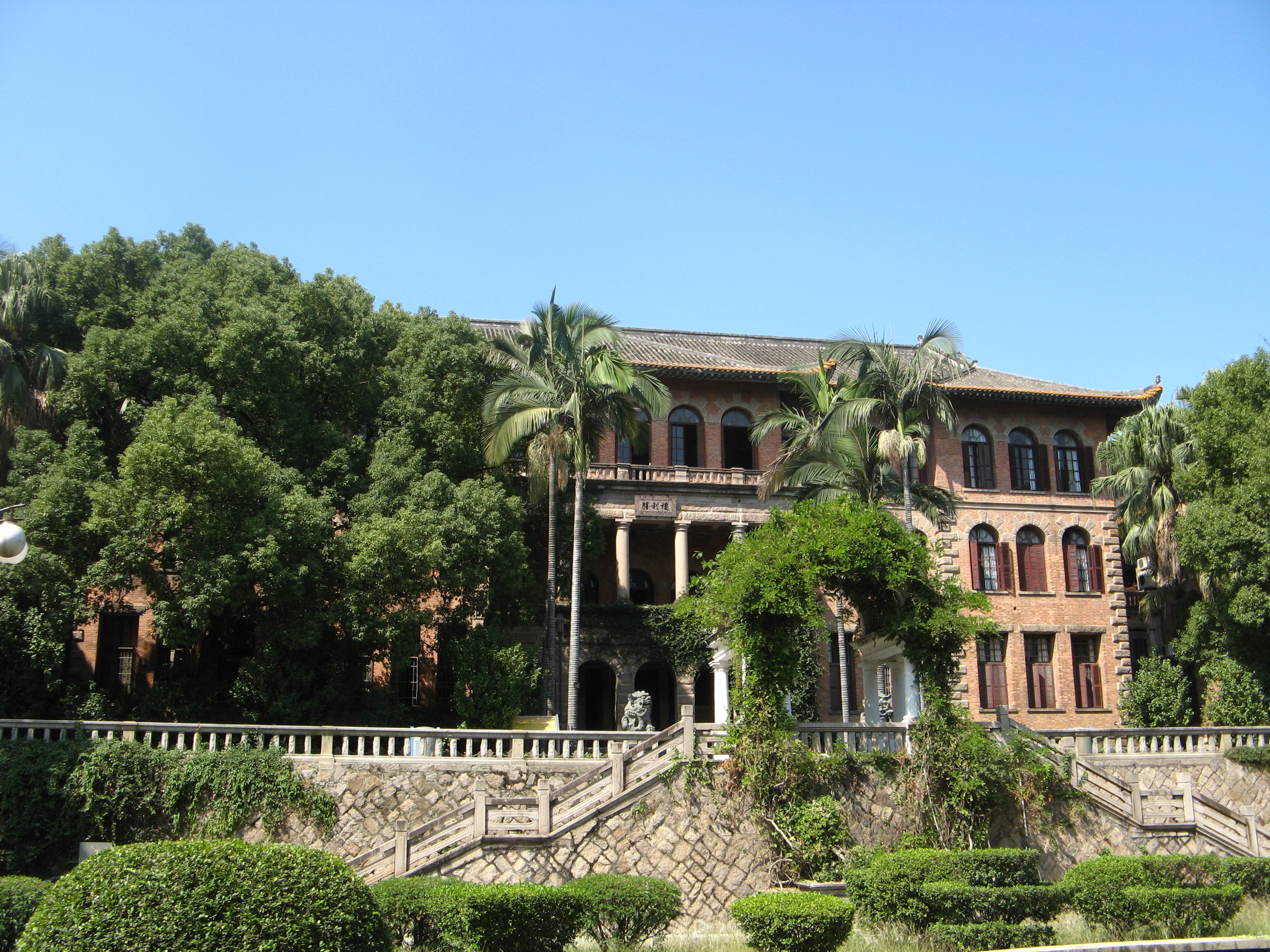
The old campus of Fujian Normal University

- Fujian Normal University (福建师范大学; founded in 1907)
- Fuzhou University (福州大学; founded in 1958)
- Fujian Agriculture and Forestry University (福建农林大学; founded in 1958)

Three Universities above take the leading position in the province, and they are supported by Fujian Government to build High-level University.

- Fujian Medical University
- Fujian University of Traditional Chinese Medicine
- Minjiang University
- Fujian University of Technology
- Fujian Police College
- Fujian Commercial College
- Fijian Jiangxia University

Note: Institutions without full-time bachelor programs are not listed.

=== High schools ===
- Fuzhou No.8 Middle School (福州第八中学)
- Fuzhou Foreign Language School (福州外国语学校)
- Fuzhou Gezhi High School (福州格致中学)
- Fuzhou No.1 Middle School (福建省福州第一中学)
- Fuzhou No.3 Middle School (福州第三中学)
- Fuzhou Senior High School (福州高级中学)
- Fuzhou No.4 Middle School (福州第四中学)
- Fuzhou No.2 Middle School (福州第二中学)
- The Affiliated High School Of Fujian Normal University (福建师范大学附属中学)
- Fuzhou Pingdong Middle School (福州屏东中学)

== Notable people ==
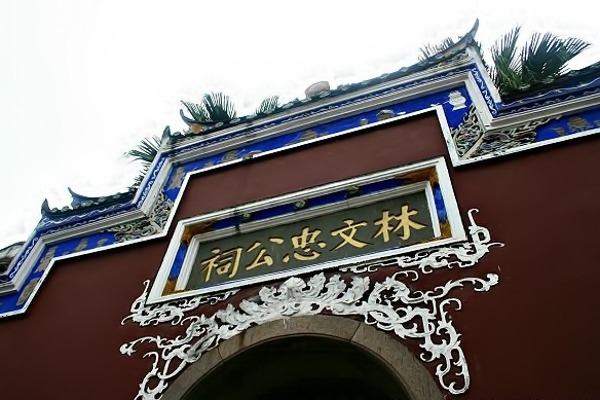
Fuzhou Memorial Hall of Lin Zexu

- Sa Zhenbing (萨镇冰, 1859–1952), high-ranking naval officer of Mongolian origin
- Go Seigen (吳清源, 1914–2014), Weiqi/Go player, considered by many players to be the greatest player of the game in the 20th century and one of the greatest of all time
- Lin Changmin (zh:林長民, 1876–1925), a high-rank governor in the Beiyang Government
- Lin Huiyin (林徽因, 1904–1955), architect and writer
- Lin Juemin (林觉民, 1887–1911), one of 72 Revolutionary Martyrs at Huanghuagang, Guangzhou
- Murong Shenxing (zh:慕容慎行, 1934–2018), neuroscientist, researcher and doctor
- Ingen (隱元隆琦, 1592–1673), well known Buddhist monk, poet and calligrapher who lived during Ming dynasty
- Baizhang Huaihai (百丈懷海, 720–814), an influential master of Zen Buddhism during the Tang dynasty
- Huangbo Xiyun (黄檗希運, died 850), an influential master of Zen Buddhism during the Tang dynasty
- Chen Youding (陳友定, 1330–1368), a prominent military leader during the Yuan dynasty
- Gao Bing (高棅, 1350–1423), an author and poetry theorist during the Ming dynasty
- Zhang Jing (張經, 1492–1555), a prominent military leader during the Ming dynasty
- Zheng Xiaoxu (鄭孝胥, 1860–1938), statesman, diplomat and calligrapher
- Liang Hongzhi (梁鴻志, 1882–1946), a high-rank governor in the Beiyang Government
- Chen Baochen (陈宝琛, 1848–1935), scholar and loyalist to the Qing dynasty
- Tang Yunsheng (唐韻笙, 1903–1971), a renowned Peking opera singer of Manchu origin
- Chih-Tang Sah (薩支唐, born 1932), Chinese-American engineer of Mongolian origin
- Chen Shaokuan (陳紹寬, 1889–1969), Fleet Admiral who served as the senior commander of naval forces of the National Revolutionary Army
- Bing Xin (冰心, 1900–1999), writer
- Zheng Zhenduo (郑振铎, 1898–1958), journalist and literary scholar
- Zou Taofen (鄒韜奮, 1895–1944), journalist, media entrepreneur, and political activist
- Zhan Shi Chai (詹世釵, 1840s–1893), entertainer as "Chang the Chinese Giant"
- Huang Naishang (黄乃裳, 1849–1924), Christian scholar, and founding father of Malaysian town of Sibu, in the state of Sarawak
- Lin Shu (林纾, 1852–1924), scholar and translator, most famous for his translation of Alexandre Dumas' La Dame aux Camélias
- Yan Fu (严复, 1854–1921), scholar and translator, best known for introducing western ideas such as Darwinian evolution
- Lin Sen (林森, 1868–1943), President of the Republic of China from 1931 to 1943
- Tong Jixu (佟濟煦, 1884–1943), an influential politician, artist and businessman of Manchu origin
- Lin Zexu (林则徐, 1785–1850), scholar and official, considered a national hero for his strong opposition to the trade of opium before the First Anglo-Chinese War
- Shen Baozhen (沈葆桢, 1820–1879), Viceroy of Liangjiang from 1875 to 1879
- Liu Buchan (劉步蟾, 1852–1895), naval officer of the Beiyang Fleet, the most prominent of China's naval units in the late Qing dynasty
- Sa Shijun (zh:萨师俊, 1896–1938), high-ranking naval officer of Mongolian origin
- Hsien Wu (吳憲, 1893–1959), protein scientist
- Hou Debang (侯德榜, 1890–1974), chemical engineer
- Lu Yin (廬隱, 1898–1934), writer
- Hu Yepin (胡也頻, 1903–1931), writer
- Zhu Qianzhi (朱謙之, 1899–1972), intellectual, translator and historian
- Zhang Yuzhe (張鈺哲, 1902–1986), astronomer and director of the Purple Mountain Observatory
- Shu Chun Teng (鄧叔群, 1902–1970), mycologist
- Fan Tchunpi, painter and ceramicist
- Watchman Nee (倪柝声, 1903–1972), Christian author and church leader
- Deng Tuo (邓拓, 1911–1966), poet, intellectual and journalist
- Liang Shoupan (梁守槃, 1916–2009), aerospace engineer and regarded as the "father of China's cruise missile program"
- Xiao Guangyan (萧光琰, 1920–1968), chemical engineer
- Wu Mengchao (吴孟超, 1922–2021), medical scientist
- Chen Jingrun (陈景润, 1933–1996), mathematician who made significant contributions to number theory
- Chen Zhangliang (陈章良, born 1962), biologist, elected as vice-governor of Guangxi in 2007
- Lin Jiaqiao (林家翹, 1916–2013), well-known mathematician
- Shen-su Sun (孫賢鉥, 1943–2005), geochemist
- Chen Kaige (陈凯歌, born 1952), film director
- Miao Hua (苗华, born 1955), PLA Navy admiral and Director of the Political Work Department of the Central Military Commission
- Chen Pao-yu (陳寶餘, born 1958), Chief of Staff of the Taiwanese Army
- Vanessa Shih (史亞平, born 1962), Taiwanese diplomat
- Chen Haomin (陳浩民, 1969–present), Hong Kong actor and singer
- Kelly Lin (林熙蕾, born 1973), Taiwanese actress and model
- Lin Chi-ling (林志玲, born 1974), Taiwanese actress and model
- Jimmy Lin (林志穎, born 1974), Taiwanese singer, actor, and race car driver
- Chiang Tsu-ping (江祖平, born 1978), Taiwanese actress and television host
- Yao Jinnan (姚金男, born 1995), artistic gymnast who represented China at the London 2012 Olympic Games
- Eugene A. Coffin (1888–1972), rear admiral in the United States Coast Guard
- Zhou Zihe (周子和, 1874–1926), possible shifu of Uechi Kanbun, founder of Uechi Ryū
- Ludi Lin (林路迪, born 1987), Chinese-Canadian actor and model
- Jony J (肖佳, born 1989), rapper and songwriter
- Xu Bin (徐彬, born 1989), actor and singer
- Tai Choo Yee (戴祖亿 born 1990), Chinese Malaysian YouTuber and journalist

== See also ==
- Nantai Island
- List of cities in the People's Republic of China by population
- List of twin towns and sister cities in China
- Fuzhounese people
- Fuzhou language
- Fujian
