= Nanmendou station =

Metro station in Fuzhou, China

Nanmendou 南门兜
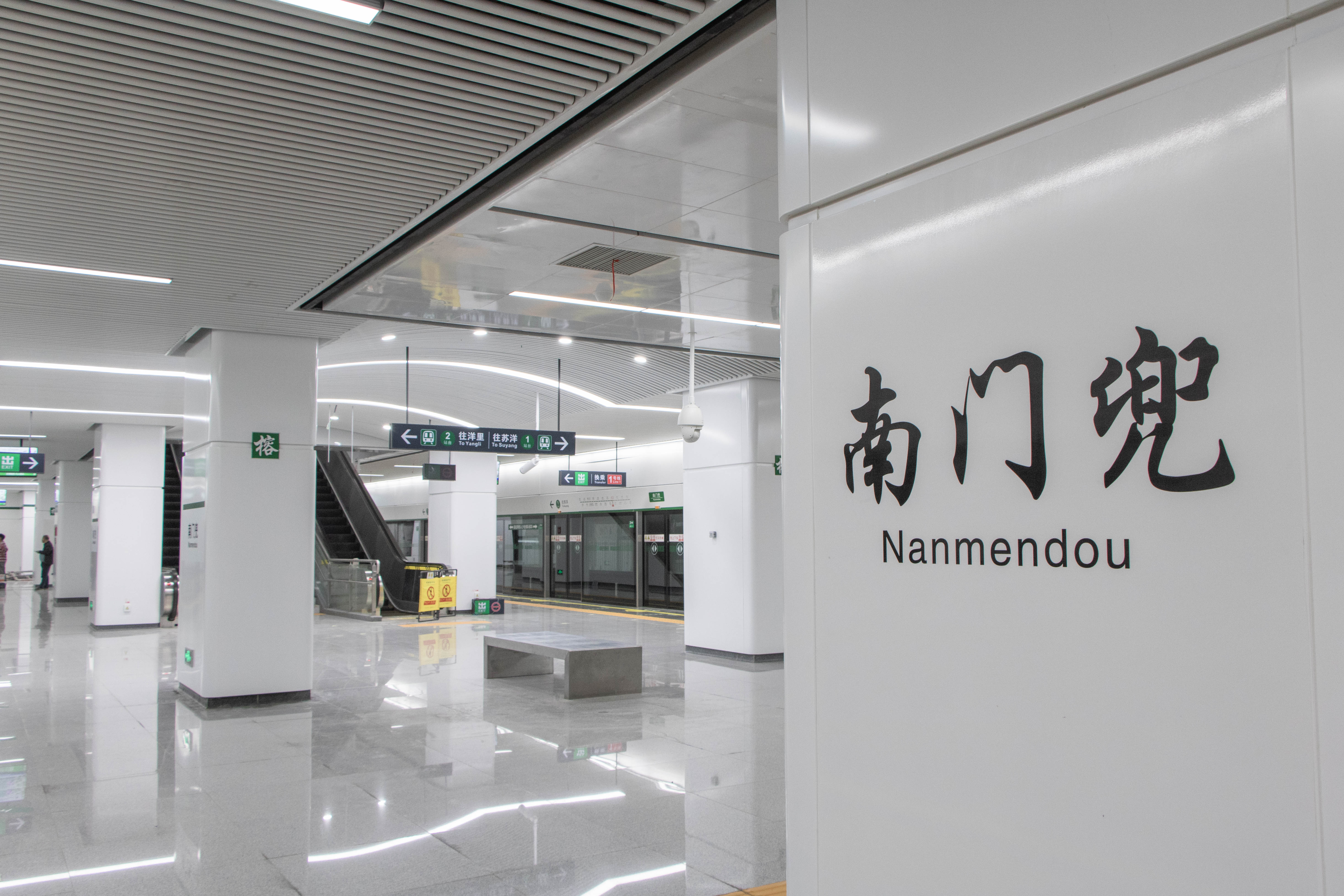
- Line 2 Nameboard of Nanmendou Station

Chinese name
- Traditional Chinese: 南門兜
- Simplified Chinese: 南门兜
Transcriptions
Standard Mandarin
- Hanyu Pinyin: Nánméndōu
Eastern Min
- Fuzhou BUC: Nàng-muòng-dău

General information
- Location: Gulou, Fuzhou, Fujian; China
- Coordinates: 26.0793338°N 119.2973556°E
- Operated by: Fuzhou Metro Co. Ltd. Fuzhou CETC Rail Transit Co., Ltd..
- Lines: Line 1 Line 2
- Platforms: 4

Construction
- Structure type: Underground

History
- Opened: Line 1: 6 January 2017; 8 years ago Line 2: 26 April 2019; 6 years ago

Services
Preceding station	Fuzhou Metro	Following station
Dongjiekou towards Xiangfeng	Line 1	Chating towards Sanjiangkou
Xiyang towards Suyang	Line 2	Shuibu towards Yangli
Location

Nanmendou station (Chinese: 南门兜站; pinyin: Nánméndōu zhàn; Fuzhounese: [naŋ˥˥ muoŋ˥˥ nau˥˥]) is a transfer station of Line 1 and Line 2, also the first transfer station of the Fuzhou Metro. It is located near the junction of Wushan Road, Bayiqi Road and Gutian Road, Gulou, Fuzhou, Fujian, China. The section of Line 1 started operation on January 6, 2017, while the section of Line 2 started operation on April 26, 2019.

== Station details ==
=== Services ===
The station is served by Line 1 and Line 2 and is currently the only interchange on the Fuzhou Metro network. On Line 1, the station is located between Dongjiekou and Chating stations, with a headway of 5′45″ (towards Fuzhou South Railway Station) or 11′30″ (towards Sanjiangkou) during peak hours and 8′20″ during slack hours. On Line 2, the station is located between Xiyang and Shuibu stations with a headway of 6′30″ during peak hours and 8′20″ to 10′ during slack hours.

=== Station design ===
The station has three basement levels and currently is the only transfer station on the network, serving two metro lines. The B1 floor is the concourse floor; the north side of B2 floor is the platform level of Line 1 with an island platform, the south side of the B2 floor is the transfer hall; B3 floor is the platform level of Line 2 with an island platform.

=== Exits and entrances ===
- A1: South of the intersection of Daoshan Road and Bayiqi Road
- A2: Connect to Underground Parking of Guanya Plaza
- B: West of Bayiqi Road
- C: Guanya Plaza B1
- D2: Southwest of the intersection of Gutian Road and Bayiqi Road
- D3: Southeast of the intersection of Gutian Road and Bayiqi Road
- E: East of Bayiqi Road
- H: Northeast of the intersection of Gutian Road and Bayiqi Road
- G1: Northwest of the intersection of Gutian Road and Xinquan Road
