= Qianyu station =

Fuzhou Metro station

Qianyu 前屿
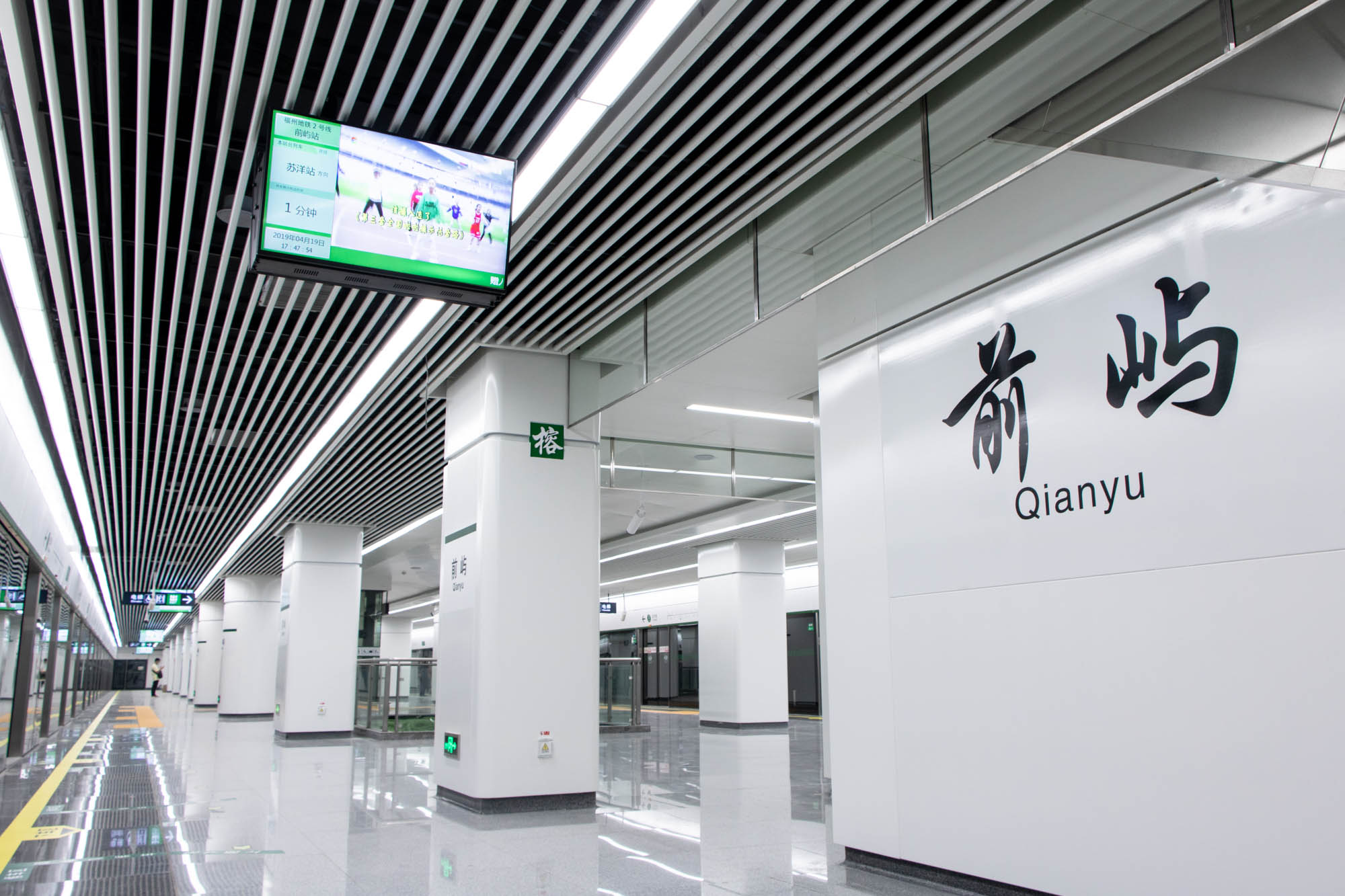

General information
- Location: Jin'an District, Fuzhou, Fujian; China
- Coordinates: 26.0756760°N 119.3456358°E
- Operated by: Fuzhou CETC Rail Transit Co., Ltd..
- Lines: Line 2 Line 4
- Platforms: 4 (2 island platforms)

Construction
- Structure type: Underground

History
- Opened: Line 2: April 26, 2019; Line 4: August 27, 2023

Services
Preceding station	Fuzhou Metro	Following station
Wuliting towards Suyang	Line 2	Shangyang towards Yangli
Houyu towards Banzhou	Line 4	Guangmingggang towards Difengjiang
Location

Qianyu Station (Chinese: 前屿站; pinyin: Qiányǔ zhàn; Fuzhounese: [sɛiŋ˨˩ løy˨˦˨]) is a transfer station of Line 2 and Line 4 of the Fuzhou Metro. It is located near the intersection of Fuma Road and Lianjiang Road, Jin'an District, Fuzhou, Fujian, China. It started operation on April 26, 2019.

== Station layout ==
G	Street level	Exits
B1	Concourse	Customer Service, Automatic Ticketing Machines
B2	Platform 1	← Line 2 towards Suyang (Wuliting)
Platforms	Island platform, doors will open on the left
	Platform 2	→ Line 2 towards Yangli (Shangyang)→
B3	Platform 3	← Line 4 towards Difengjiang (Houyu)
Platforms	Island platform, doors will open on the left
	Platform 4	→ Line 4 towards Banzhou (Guangminggang)→

== Exits ==
Exit number	Exit location
Exit A	Northeast of the station
Exit B	Northwest of the station
Exit D	Southeast of the station
