= Shangyang station =

Metro station in Fuzhou, China

Shangyang 上洋
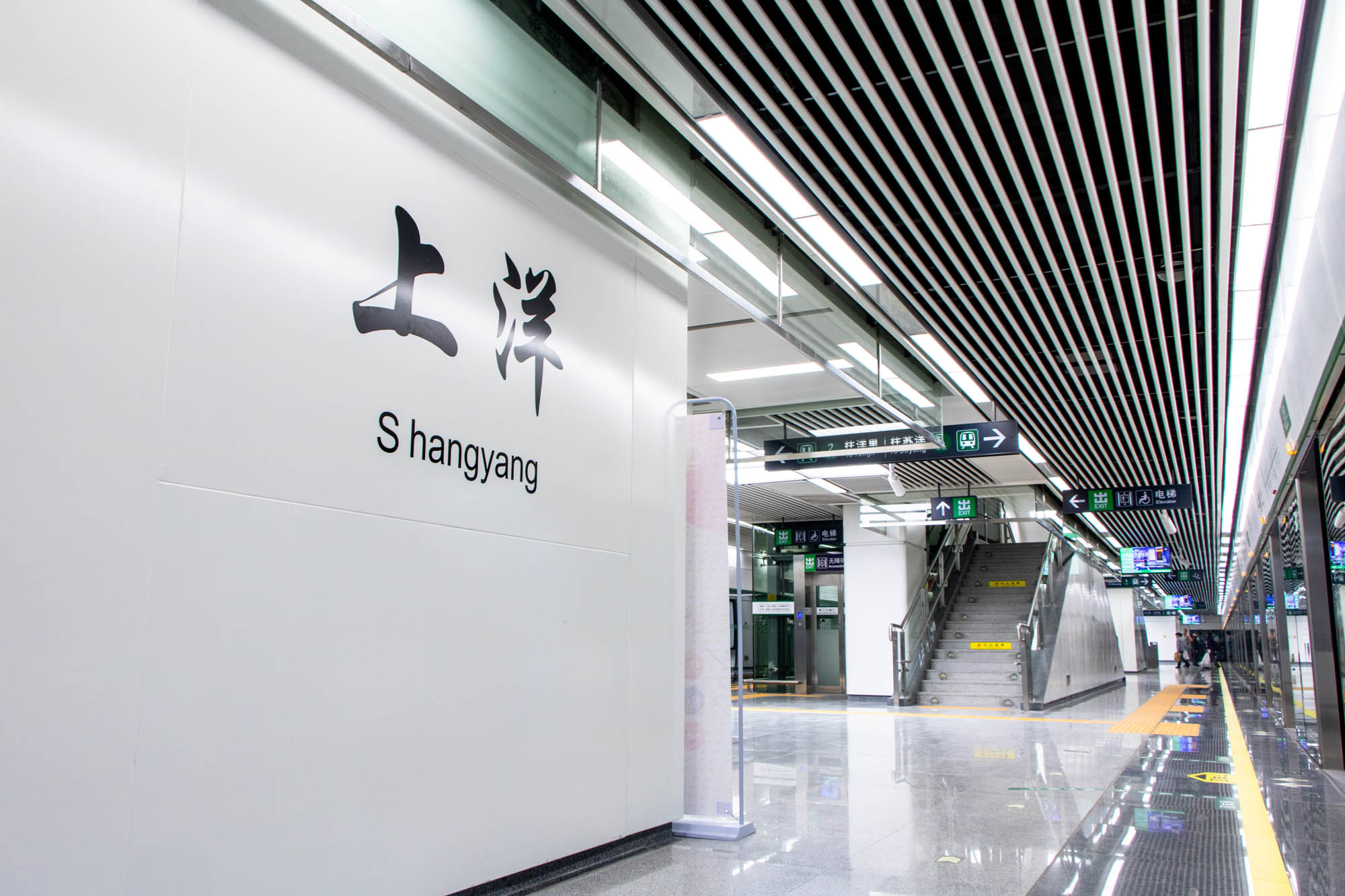

General information
- Location: Jin'an District, Fuzhou, Fujian; China
- Coordinates: 26.0691323°N 119.3587867°E
- Operated by: Fuzhou CETC Rail Transit Co., Ltd..
- Line(s): Line 2
- Platforms: 2

Construction
- Structure type: Underground

History
- Opened: April 26, 2019

Services
Preceding station	Fuzhou Metro	Following station
Qianyu towards Suyang	Line 2	Gushan towards Yangli

Shangyang Station (Chinese: 上洋站; pinyin: Shàngyáng zhàn; Fuzhounese: [suoŋ˥˥ yoŋ˥˧]) is a metro station of Line 2 of the Fuzhou Metro. It is located near the intersection of Fuma Road and Fuxing Avenue, Jin'an District, Fuzhou, Fujian, China. It started operation on April 26, 2019.

== Station layout ==
G
Street level
Exits
B1

Concourse
Customer Service, Automatic Ticketing Machines
B2

Platforms

Platform 1
← Line 2 towards Suyang (Qianyu)
Island platform, doors will open on the left
Platform 2
Line 2 towards Yangli (Gushan)→

== Exits ==
Exit number	Exit location
Exit A	Northwest of the station
Exit B	Northwest of the station
Exit D	Southwest of the station
Exit E1	Southeast of the station
Exit E2	Northeast of the station
