= Dongmen station =

Donngmen station may refer to:

- Dongmen metro station, an interchange station of the Tamsui–Xinyi line and the Zhonghe–Xinlu line on the Taipei Metro in Taipei.
- Dongmen station (Shenzhen Metro), a station on Line 5 of the Shenzhen Metro in Shenzhen, Guangdong, China.
- Dongmen station (Fuzhou Metro), an interchange station of Line 4 and the Binhai Express line of the Fuzhou Metro in Fuzhou, Fujian, China.
- Dongmen Railway Station, a train station in the Xiangfang District of Harbin, Heilongjiang, China.
