= Gushan =

Gushan may refer to:

- Gushan Environmental Energy (古杉集团), mainland Chinese biodiesel producer
- Viktor Gushan, Moldovan–Russian businessman
- Gushan, Khash (گوشان), a village in Iran

== Places in Greater China ==
- Gushan District (鼓山區), Kaohsiung, Taiwan
- Mount Gu (Jingjiang) (孤山), or "Lonely Hill", a hill in Jingjiang, Jiangsu
- Gushan (Hangzhou), an island in the West Lake

=== Towns ===
- Gushan, Fuzhou (鼓山镇), in Jin'an District, Fuzhou, Fujian
- Gushan, Jiangyin (顾山镇), in Jiangyin City, Jiangsu

Written as "崮山镇":

- Gushan, Weihai, a village in Huancui District, Weihai, Shandong
- Gushan, Zibo, a village in Boshan District, Zibo, Shandong

Written as "孤山镇":

- Gushan, in Donggang City, Liaoning
- Gushan, Jingjiang, in Jingjiang City, Jiangsu
- Gushan Manchu Town (孤山满族镇), in Haicheng City, Liaoning

== See also ==
- Gushan station (disambiguation)
