= Shangjie station =

Metro station in Fuzhou, China

Shangjie 上街
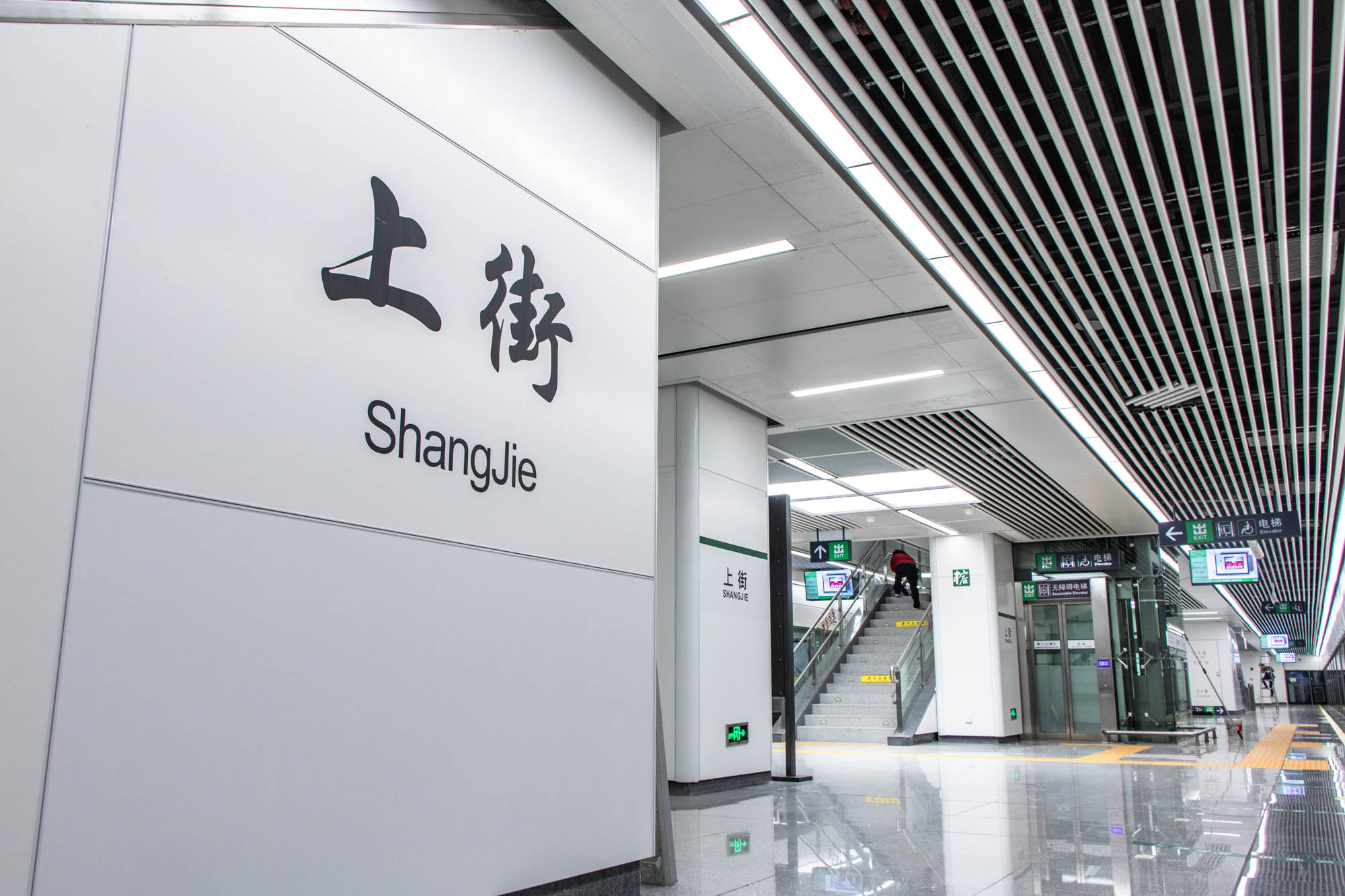

General information
- Location: Minhou County, Fuzhou, Fujian; China
- Coordinates: 26.0793626°N 119.1812648°E
- Operated by: Fuzhou CETC Rail Transit Co., Ltd..
- Line(s): Line 2
- Platforms: 2

Construction
- Structure type: Underground

History
- Opened: April 26, 2019

Services
Preceding station	Fuzhou Metro	Following station
Shadi towards Suyang	Line 2	Jinyu towards Yangli

Shangjie Station (Chinese: 上街站; pinyin: Shàngjiē zhàn; Fuzhounese: [suoŋ˥˥ ɛ˥˥]) is a metro station of Line 2 of the Fuzhou Metro. It is located near the intersection of Guobin Avenue and Qiuyang West Road, Minhou County, Fuzhou, Fujian, China. It started operation on April 26, 2019.

== Station layout ==
G
Street level
Exits A, B and D
B1
Concourse
Customer Service, Automatic Ticketing Machines
B2

Platforms

Platform 1
← Line 2 towards Suyang (Shadi)
Island platform, doors will open on the left
Platform 2
Line 2 towards Yangli (Jinyu)→

== Exits ==
Exit number	Exit location
Exit A	Northeast of the station
Exit B	Northwest of the station
Exit D	Southeast of the station
