= Shuibu station =

Metro station in Fuzhou, China

Shuibu 水部
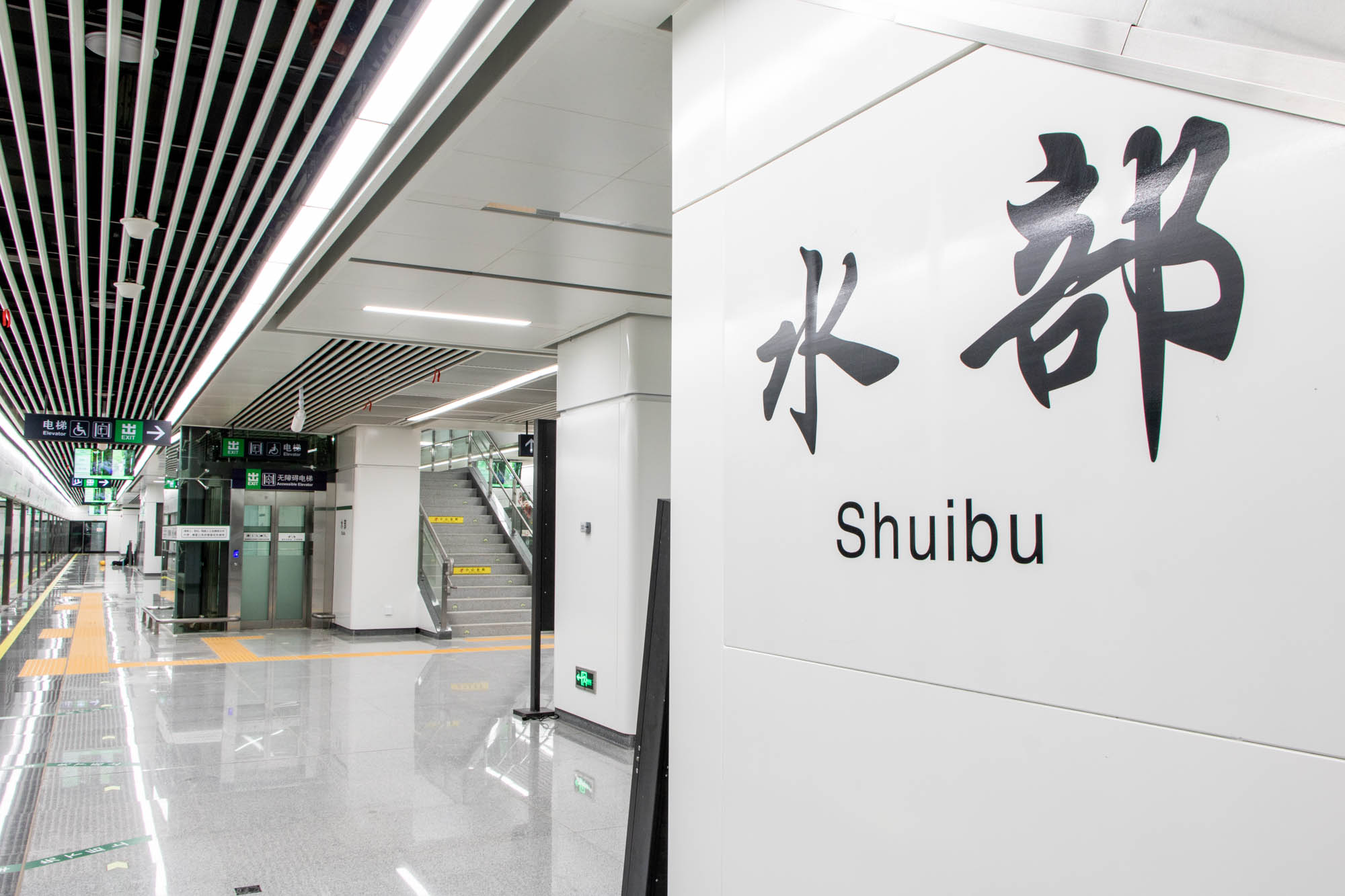

General information
- Location: Gulou District, Fuzhou, Fujian; China
- Coordinates: 26.0796725°N 119.3088077°E
- Operated by: Fuzhou CETC Rail Transit Co., Ltd..
- Line(s): Line 2
- Platforms: 2

Construction
- Structure type: Underground

History
- Opened: April 26, 2019

Services
Preceding station	Fuzhou Metro	Following station
Nanmendou towards Suyang	Line 2	Ziyang towards Yangli

Shuibu Station (Chinese: 水部站; pinyin: Shuǐbù zhàn; Fuzhounese: [t͡sui˥˥ βuɔ˨˦˨]) is a metro station of Line 2 of the Fuzhou Metro. It is located near the intersection of Gutian Road and Jianhua Branch Lane, Gulou District, Fuzhou, Fujian, China. It started operation on April 26, 2019.

== Station layout ==
G
Street level
Exits A, C, D
B1

Concourse
Customer Service, Automatic Ticketing Machines
B2

Platforms

Platform 1
← Line 2 towards Suyang (Nanmendou)
Island platform, doors will open on the left
Platform 2
Line 2 towards Yangli (Ziyang)→

== Exits ==
Exit number	Exit location
Exit A	Northeast of the station
Exit C	Southwest of the station
Exit D	Southeast of the station
