= Jinyu station (Fuzhou Metro) =

Metro station in Fuzhou, China

Jinyu 金屿
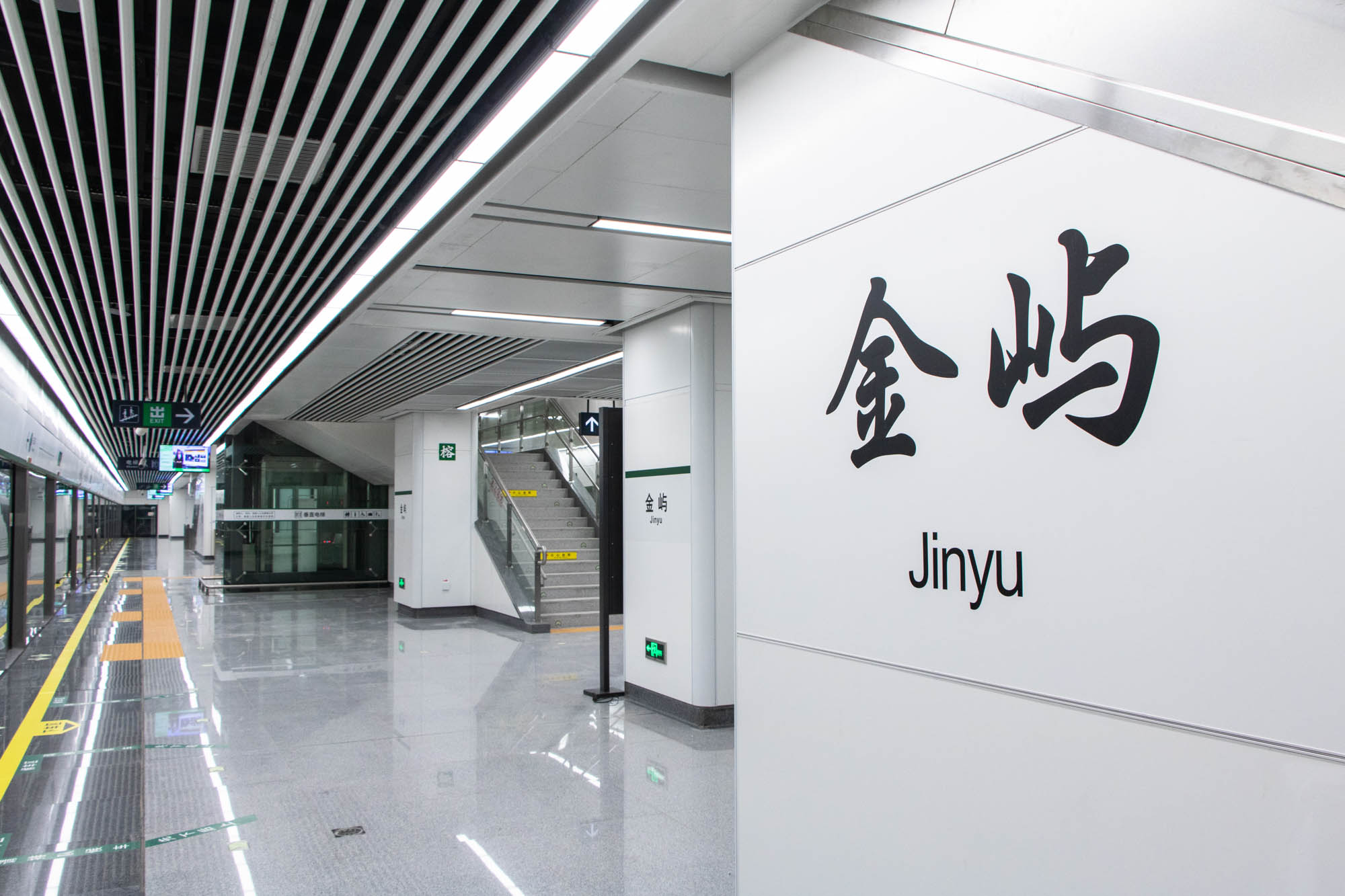

General information
- Location: Minhou County, Fuzhou, Fujian; China
- Coordinates: 26.0704370°N 119.1954614°E
- Operated by: Fuzhou CETC Rail Transit Co., Ltd..
- Line(s): Line 2
- Platforms: 2

Construction
- Structure type: Underground

History
- Opened: April 26, 2019

Services
| Preceding station | Fuzhou Metro | Following station |
|---|---|---|
| Shangjie towards Suyang | Line 2 | Fuzhou University towards Yangli |

Jinyu Station (Chinese: 金屿站; pinyin: Jīnyǔ zhàn; Fuzhounese: [kiŋ˥˧ løy˨˦˨]) is a metro station of Line 2 of the Fuzhou Metro. It is located near the intersection of Guobin Avenue, Qishan Avenue and Xiyuangong Road, Minhou County, Fuzhou, Fujian, China. It started operation on April 26, 2019.

== Station layout ==
G
Street level
Exits
B1
Concourse
Customer Service, Automatic Ticketing Machines
B2

Platforms

Platform 1
← Line 2 towards Suyang (Shangjie)
Island platform, doors will open on the left
Platform 2
Line 2 towards Yangli (Fuzhou University)→

== Exits ==
| Exit number | Exit location |
|---|---|
| Exit B | Northwest of the station |
| Exit C | Southwest of the station |
| Exit D | Southeast of the station |
