= Jinyu station =

Jinyu station can refer to the following stations:

- Jinyu station (Chongqing Rail Transit), a station on Line 3 (Chongqing Rail Transit)
- Jinyu station (Fuzhou Metro), a station on Line 2 (Fuzhou Metro)
- Jinyu Hutong station, a station on Line 8 (Beijing Subway)
