= Dongjiekou station =

Metro station in Fuzhou, China

Dongjiekou 东街口
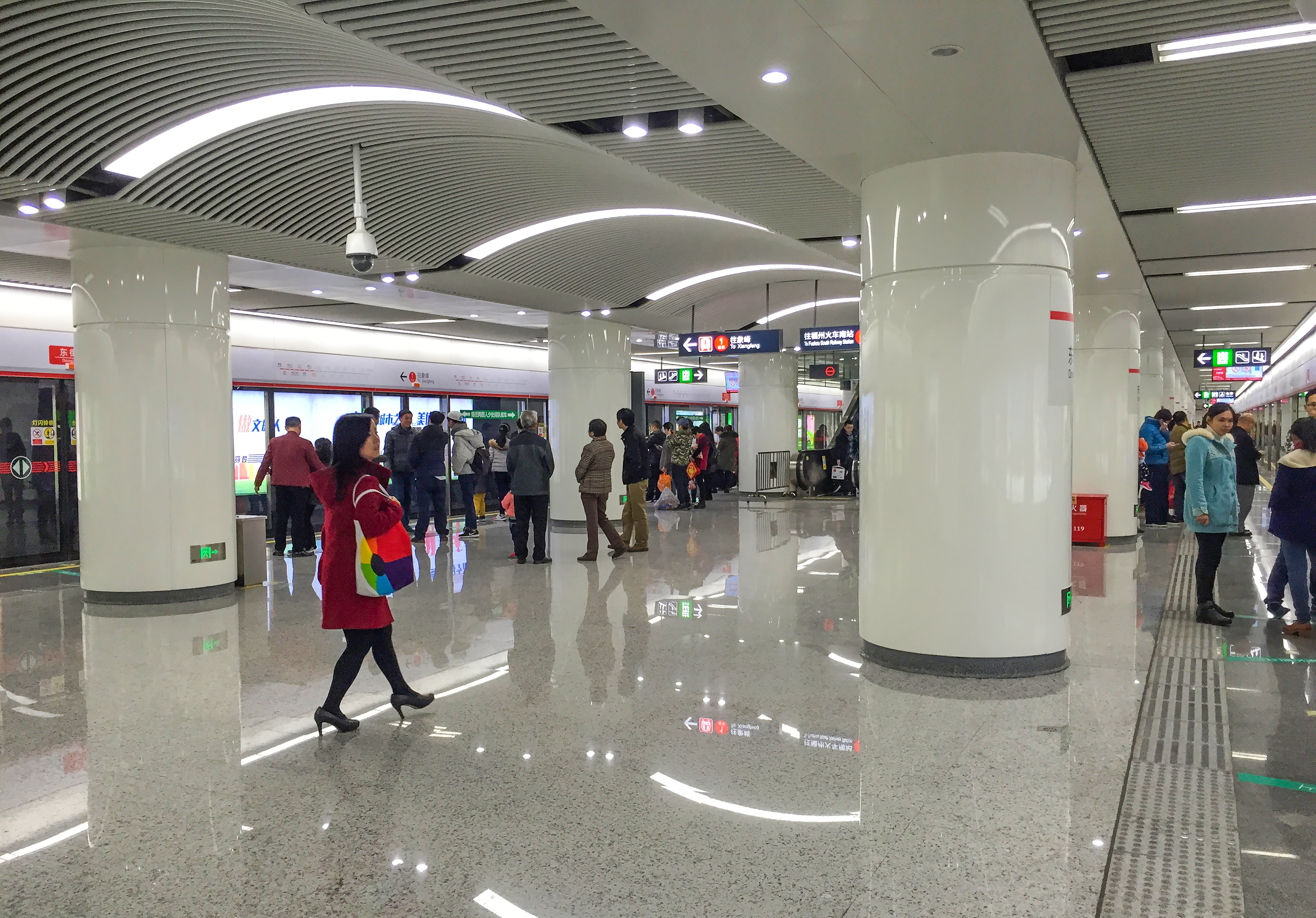
- Platform of Dongjiekou Station

General information
- Location: Gulou District, Fuzhou, Fujian; China
- Coordinates: 26°5′9″N 119°17′58″E
- Operated by: Fuzhou Metro Co. Ltd.
- Lines: Line 1 Line 4
- Platforms: 4 (2 island platforms)

Construction
- Structure type: Underground

History
- Opened: Line 1: January 6, 2017; Line 4: August 27, 2023

Services
Preceding station	Fuzhou Metro	Following station
Pingshan towards Xiangfeng	Line 1	Nanmendou towards Sanjiangkou
Ximen towards Banzhou	Line 4	Provincial Hospital towards Difengjiang
Location

Dongjiekou Station (Chinese: 东街口站; pinyin: Dōngjiēkǒu zhàn; Fuzhounese: [tøŋ˨˩ ɛ˥˧ au˧˧]) is a metro station of Line 1 and Line 4 of the Fuzhou Metro. This station is located at the intersection of Bayiqi North Road and Yangqiao East Road in Gulou District, Fuzhou, Fujian, China. Service at this station began on January 6, 2017. The Three Lanes and Seven Alleys is located southwest of this station.

== Station layout ==
Dongjiekou station has a round concourse on B1 floor, below which is the platform for Line 1. This station also has another level for Line 4.

== Transport connections ==
=== Rail ===
Schedule as of January 2020

Destination	First Train	Last Train
Line 1
to Xiangfeng	6:58 am	11:37 pm
to Sanjiangkou	6:45 am	11:15 pm
