= Shadi station =

Metro station in Fuzhou, China

Shadi 沙堤
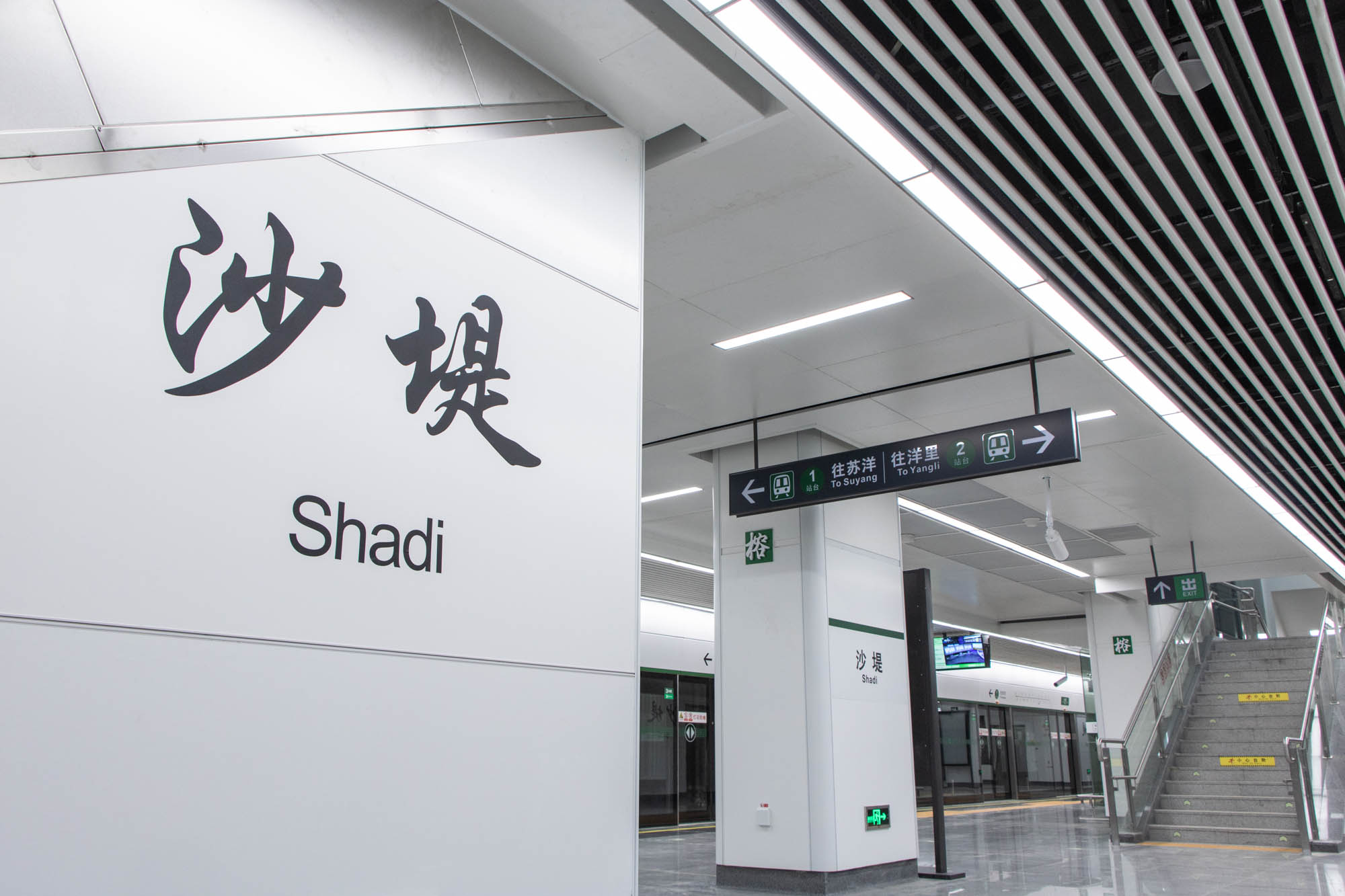

General information
- Location: Minhou County, Fuzhou, Fujian; China
- Coordinates: 26.0898228°N 119.1672780°E
- Operated by: Fuzhou CETC Rail Transit Co., Ltd..
- Line(s): Line 2
- Platforms: 2

Construction
- Structure type: Underground

History
- Opened: April 26, 2019

Services
Preceding station	Fuzhou Metro	Following station
Suyang Terminus	Line 2	Shangjie towards Yangli

Shadi Station (Chinese: 沙堤站; pinyin: Shādī zhàn; Fuzhounese: [sai˥˧ liɛu˨˦˨]) is a metro station of Line 2 of the Fuzhou Metro. It is located near Shadi village, Minhou County, Fuzhou, Fujian, China. It started operation on April 26, 2019.

== Station layout ==
G
Street level
Exits A, B and C
B1

Concourse
Customer Service, Automatic Ticketing Machines
B2

Platforms

Platform 1
← Line 2 towards Suyang (Suyang)
Island platform, doors will open on the left
Platform 2
Line 2 towards Yangli (Shangjie)→

== Exits ==
Exit number	Exit location
Exit A	Northeast of the station
Exit B	Northwest of the station
Exit C	Southwest of the station
