= Fuzhou Mosque =

Mosque in Fuzhou, Fujian, China

- 福州清真寺
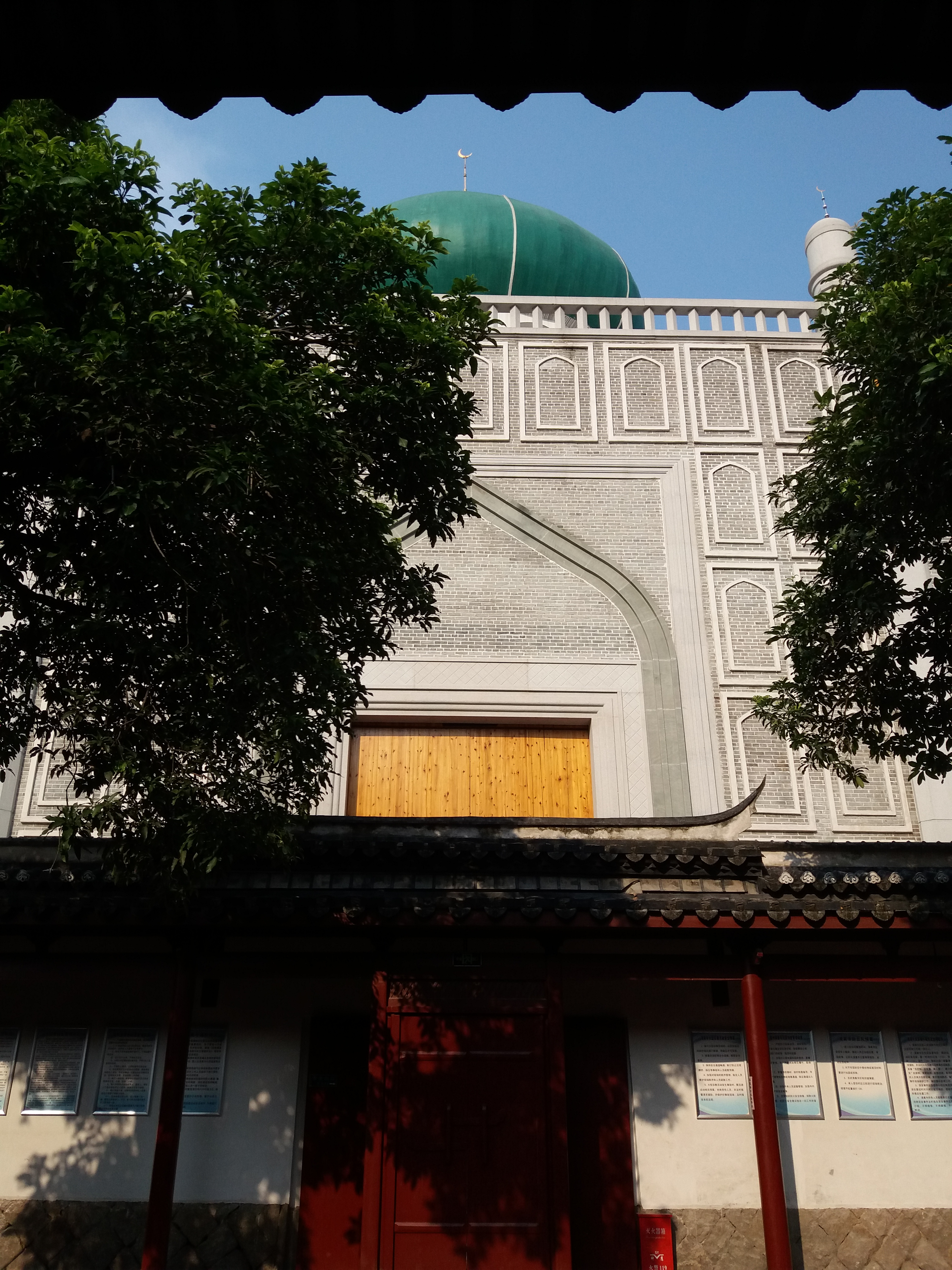
- The dome of the mosque, in 2015

- Location of the mosque in Fujian

Religion
- Affiliation: Sunni Islam
- Ecclesiastical or organizational status: Mosque
- Status: Active

Location
- Location: Bayiqi North Road, Gulou, Fuzhou, Fujian
- Country: China
- Interactive map of Fuzhou Mosque
- Coordinates: 26°5′2″N 119°17′50″E

Architecture
- Type: Mosque
- Completed: 628 CE (original); 1549 CE (rebuilt)

Specifications
- Capacity: 100 worshipers
- Interior area: 1,800 m^{2} (19,000 sq ft)
- Dome: 1
- Site area: 1.4 ha (3.5 acres)

The Fuzhou Mosque (Chinese: 福州清真寺; pinyin: Fúzhōu Qīngzhēnsì) is a mosque in Gulou District, Fuzhou City, in the Fujian Province of China. It is located under the Ankang Bridge in Fuzhou. Following a fire, the mosque was rebuilt during the Ming Dynasty.

Set on a 1.4-hectare (3.5-acre) site, the mosque was completed in 628 CE, in the second year of Zhenguan, during the Tang dynasty. The internal area of the mosque is 1,800 square metres (19,000 sq ft) with a 400-square-metre (4,300 sq ft) prayer hall. Renovations were completed in 1407 and 1549. The majority of the worshipers are from Hui, Uygur, Uzbek and other backgrounds.

The mosque is within walking distance north of Nanmendou Station of Fuzhou Metro.

== See also ==
- Islam in China
- List of mosques in China
- List of oldest mosques in China
