= Line 2 (Fuzhou Metro) =

Metro line in Fuzhou, Fujian, China

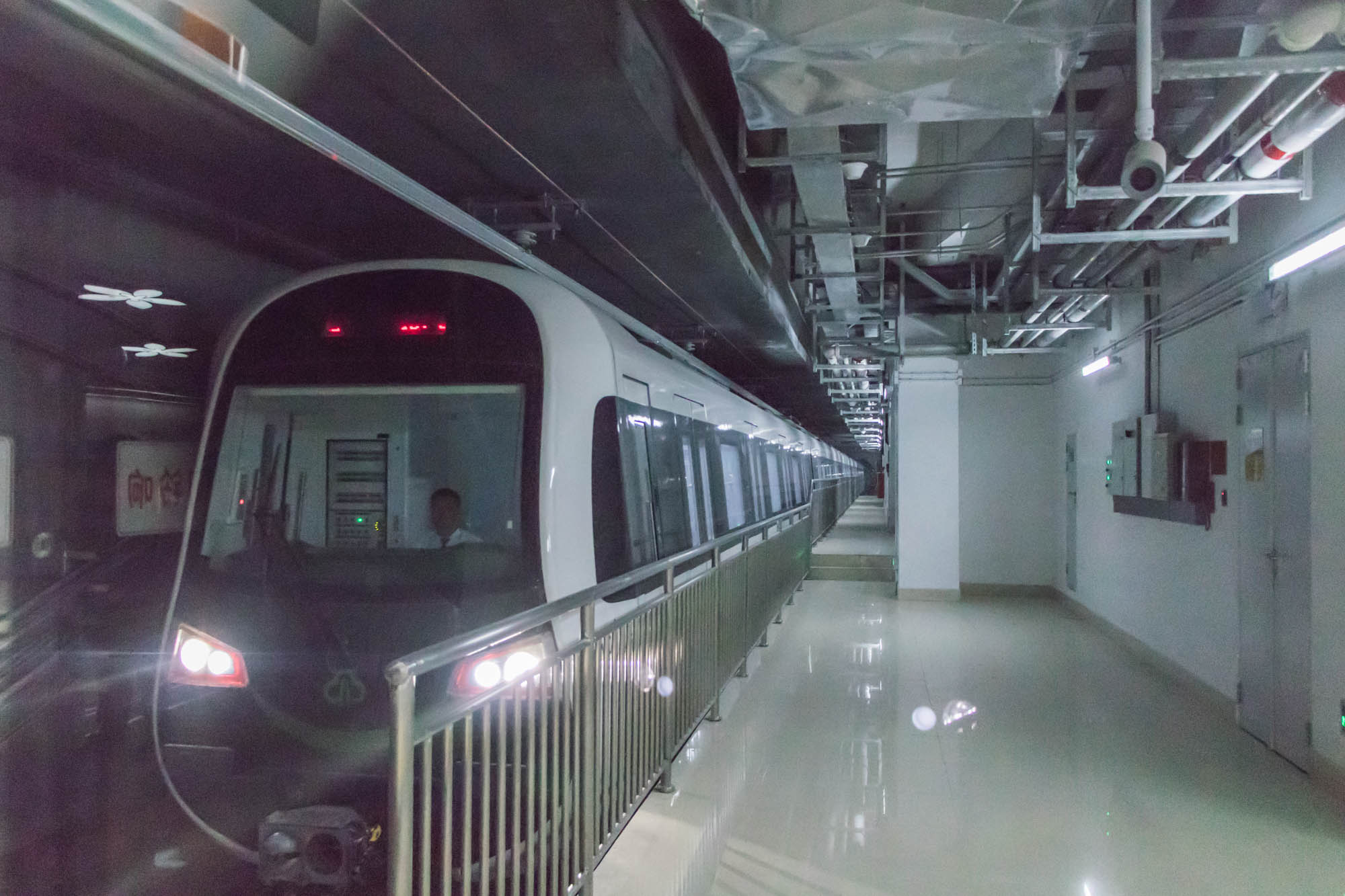
- Line 2 train at Jinshan station

Overview
- Status: In Operation
- Owner: City of Fuzhou
- Locale: Fuzhou, Fujian, China
- Termini: Suyang; Yangli
- Stations: 22
- Website: http://www.fzrail2.com

Service
- Type: Rapid transit
- System: Fuzhou Metro
- Operator(s): Fuzhou CETC Rail Transit Co., Ltd.
- Depot(s): Gushan Depot, Zhuqi Depot (future)

History
- Opened: 26 April 2019; 7 years ago

Technical
- Line length: 30.629 km (19.0 mi)
- Character: Underground
- Track gauge: 1,435 mm (4 ft 8 1/2 in)
- Operating speed: 80 km/h (Maximum)

Line 2 of the Fuzhou Metro (simplified Chinese: 福州地铁2号线; traditional Chinese: 福州地鐵2號線; pinyin: Fúzhōu Dìtiě Èr Hào Xiàn) is a rapid transit line in the city of Fuzhou, Fujian Province in China. The line is 30.629 km long with 22 stations. Line 2's color is ■ green.

Line 2 operated by Fuzhou CETC Rail Transit Co., Ltd. under PPP contract. It's responsible for investment, construction, operation and maintenance of Line 2, with a concession period of 27 years effective from 30/11/2016.

== Description ==
=== Phase 1 ===
Phase 1 of Line 2 runs in an east–west direction and cover the education zones, industrial zones, residential areas of Fuzhou. The construction started on November 28, 2014. It opened on 26 April 2019.

=== East extension ===
The extension to Qingzhou station is scheduled to open in 2027. The further two-station extension to Mawei Port station is under planning.

== Opening timeline ==
Segment	Commencement	Length	Station(s)	Name
Suyang — Yangli	26 April 2019	30.629 km (19.03 mi)	22	Phase 1

== Stations ==

Station name		Platform Types	Transfer	Distance km		Location	
English	Chinese	Platform Types	Transfer	Distance km		Location	
Suyang	苏洋	Island (Underground)		0.00	0.00	Minhou Co.	Phase 1
Shadi	沙堤	Island (Underground)		2.72	2.72	Minhou Co.	Phase 1
Shangjie	上街	Island (Underground)		1.75	4.47	Minhou Co.	Phase 1
Jinyu	金屿	Island (Underground)		1.61	6.07	Minhou Co.	Phase 1
Fuzhou University	福州大学	Island (Underground)		1.01	7.08	Minhou Co.	Phase 1
Dongyu / Fujian Normal University	董屿·福建师大	Island (Underground)		1.98	9.07	Minhou Co.	Phase 1
Houting	厚庭	Island (Underground)		0.86	9.93	Minhou Co.	Phase 1
Juyuanzhou	桔园洲	Island (Underground)		2.83	12.76	Cangshan	Phase 1
Hongwan	洪湾	Island (Underground)		0.74	13.50	Cangshan	Phase 1
Jinshan	金山	Island (Underground)	5	1.24	14.75	Cangshan	Phase 1
Jinxiang	金祥	Island (Underground)		0.96	15.70	Cangshan	Phase 1
Xiangban	祥坂	Island (Underground)		2.08	17.78	Taijiang	Phase 1
Ninghua	宁化	Island (Underground)		0.78	18.56	Taijiang	Phase 1
Xiyang	西洋	Island (Underground)		1.43	19.99	Taijiang / Gulou	Phase 1
Nanmendou	南门兜	Island (Underground)	1	0.88	20.88	Gulou	Phase 1
Shuibu	水部	Island (Underground)	Binhai Express (OSI via Mindu)	1.20	22.08	Gulou	Phase 1
Ziyang	紫阳	Island (Underground)		1.29	23.37	Jin'an	Phase 1
Wuliting	五里亭	Island (Underground)		1.41	24.78	Jin'an	Phase 1
Qianyu	前屿	Island (Underground)	4	1.01	25.79	Jin'an	Phase 1
Shangyang	上洋	Island (Underground)		1.40	27.19	Jin'an	Phase 1
Gushan	鼓山	Island (Underground)		2.13	29.32	Jin'an	Phase 1
Yangli	洋里	Side (Underground)		0.97	30.29	Jin'an	Phase 1
Kuiqi	魁岐	Island (Underground)				Mawei	East extension (Section 1)
Baozhenlu	葆桢路	Island (Underground)				Mawei	East extension (Section 1)
Rujiang	儒江	Island (Underground)				Mawei	East extension (Section 1)
Xiade	下德	Island (Underground)				Mawei	East extension (Section 1)
Majiangdu	马江渡	Island (Underground)				Mawei	East extension (Section 1)
Chuanzheng Shipbuilding Heritage Park	船政文化景区	Island (Underground)				Mawei	East extension (Section 1)
Luoxingta	罗星塔	Island (Underground)				Mawei	East extension (Section 1)
Qingzhou	青洲	Island (Underground)				Mawei	East extension (Section 1)
Baoshuiqu	保税区					Mawei	East extension (Section 2, Planned)
Mawei Port	马尾港					Mawei	East extension (Section 2, Planned)

== See also ==
- List of metro systems
