= Binhai Express line =

Metro line in Fuzhou, China

Binhai Express

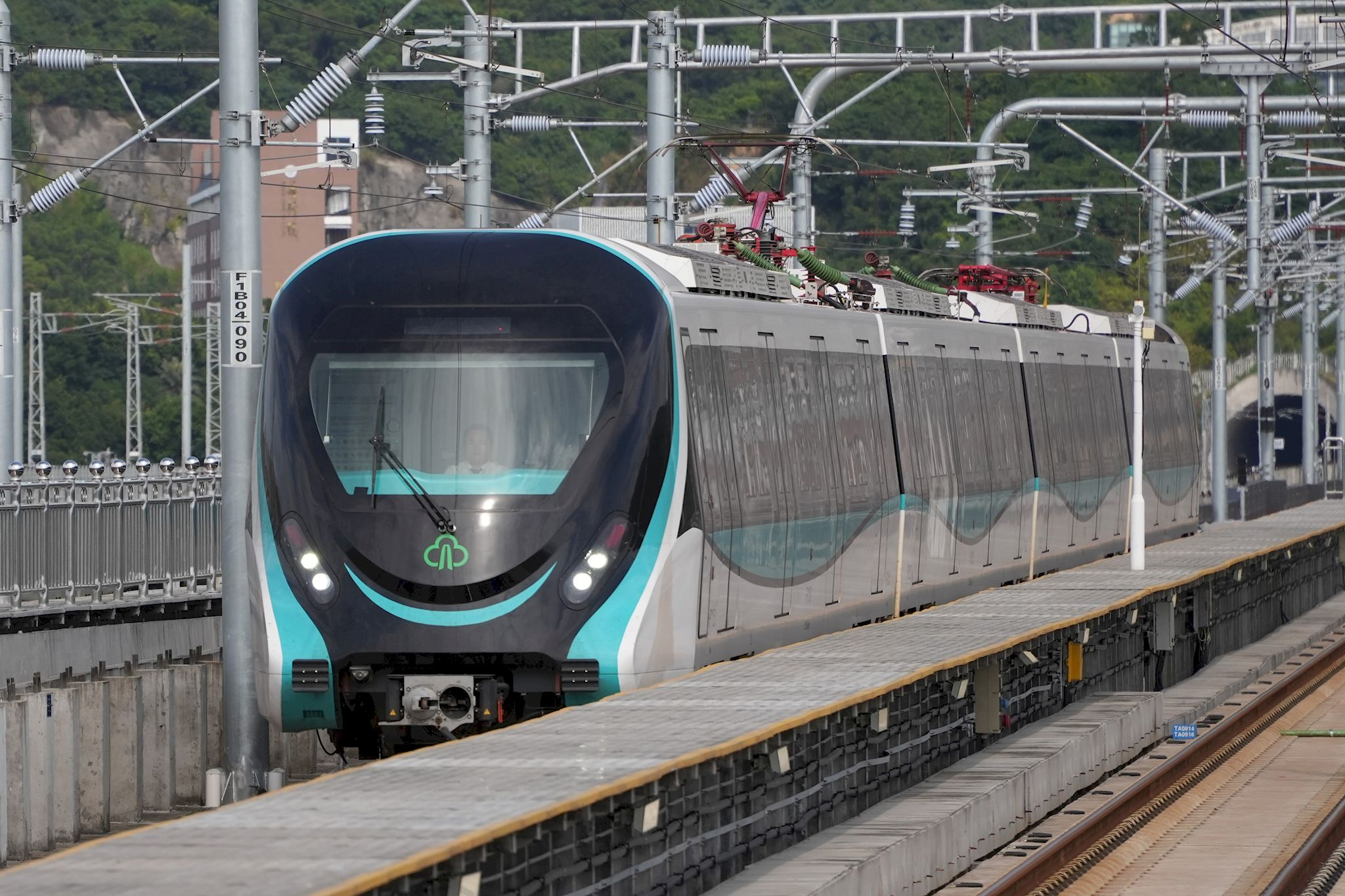
- Binhai Express train passing Shouzhan station

Overview
- Other names: Line F1; Fuzhou–Changle Airport Intercity Railway
- Native name: 福州地铁滨海快线
- Status: Operational
- Owner: Fuzhou Metro Group
- Locale: Fuzhou, Fujian, China
- Termini: Fuzhou Railway Station; Wenling
- Stations: 15 (12 operational)

Service
- Type: Rapid transit, Intercity rail, Airport rail link
- System: Fuzhou Metro
- Operator: Fuzhou Metro
- Depot(s): Wenling Depot, Daling Yard
- Rolling stock: CRRC Tangshan 4-car Type A (Intercity-A)

History
- Opened: 29 September 2025; 10 months ago

Technical
- Line length: 62.4 km (38.8 mi)
- Number of tracks: 2
- Track gauge: 1,435 mm (4 ft 8 1/2 in)
- Electrification: Overhead catenary, 25 kV AC
- Operating speed: 140 km/h (87 mph)
Route map

The Binhai Express line or Binhai Express of the Fuzhou Metro (Chinese: 福州地铁滨海快线) also known as Fuzhou-Changle Airport Intercity Railway or Line F1 is the sixth metro line in operation of Fuzhou Metro system. The color on map of this line is cyan. The total length of this line is 62.4 km (38.8 mi). This is the first line of Fuzhou Metro system with trains operating up to 140 km/h. It's officially opened for passenger service on 29 September 2025 at 2:00 pm.

== Service Routes ==
As of March 2026, there are 3 services routes in operation on this line: Local (L), Big Station Express (E), Direct Express (D). From 2 February 2026, the operation plan of Binhai Express was changed:

The first train for Fuzhou Railway Station from Wenling departs at 5:55 am is a Big station express train.

The first train departing at 5:55 am is a direct express train for Wenling from Fuzhou Railway Station with additional stops in Mindu, Sanchajie. From Sanchajie onwards, only stopping at Airport.

The second train is a big station express train, departing at 6:00 am for Wenling from Fuzhou Railway Station run on schedule. From third train onwards for Wenling, only local train is provided.

The second train from Wenling departs at 6:00 am for Fuzhou Railway Station is a local train.

Only 1 Direct Express train service for Wenling from Fuzhou Railway Station of the day (The Direct Express train for Fuzhou Railway Station from Wenling is cancelled). Operation hours of Big Station Express train service from 6:00 am (for train bound for Fuzhou Railway Station from Wenling, the departure time is 5:55 am) - 10:00 pm (9:55 pm for the last train bound for Fuzhou Railway Station from Wenling) with 60 minutes interval. The minimum departure interval for local train service is 7 minutes and 30 seconds. The last train departs at 10:30 pm, departing from Fuzhou Railway Station and Wenling and the last train is a local train, stopping at all stations along the way.

== Stations ==
From 2 February 2026, the first direct express train from Fuzhou Railway Station for Wenling with additional stops in Mindu, Sanchajie and changed departure time from 6:15 am to 5:55 am. The first direct express train from Wenling for Fuzhou Railway Station is cancelled.

Legend

- OSI: Out of System Interchange
- - : Not stop
- L: Local
- E: Big Station Express
- D: Direct Express
- - Station not opened

Station name		Transfer	Service pattern			Distance km		Location
English	Chinese	Transfer	L	E	D	Distance km		Location
Fuzhou Railway Station	福州火车站	1 FZS	●	●	●	0.00	0.00	Jin'an
Dongmen	东门	4	●	●	-			Jin'an
Mindu	闽都	2 (OSI via Shuibu)	●	-	●			Gulou
Nangongyuan	南公园		●	-	-			Taijiang
Sanchajie	三叉街	1	●	●	●			Cangshan
Gaishan	盖山		-	-	-			Cangshan
Difengjiang	帝封江	4 5	●	●	-			Cangshan
Xiangqian	祥谦		●	-	-			Minhou
Shouzhan	首占	(at Changle)	●	-	-			Changle
Lianhuashan	莲花山		-	-	-			Changle
Binhaixi	滨海西		-	-	-			Changle
Dashuju	大数据		●	●	-			Changle
Binhai CBD	滨海中央商务区		●	-	-			Changle
Airport	机场	FOC	●	●	●			Changle
Wenling	文岭		●	●	●	62.40	62.40	Changle

== Fares ==
Prices in RMB.

Fare (¥)	Fuzhou Railway Station 福州火车站	Dongmen 东门	Mindu 闽都	Nangongyuan 南公园	Sanchajie 三叉街	Difengjiang 帝封江	Xiangqian 祥谦	Shouzhan 首占	Dashuju 大数据	Binhai CBD 滨海中央商务区	Airport 机场	Wenling 文岭
Fuzhou Railway Station 福州火车站	2	2	2	3	3	4	7	10	13	14	17	18
Dongmen 东门	2	2	2	2	3	4	7	10	13	14	17	18
Mindu 闽都	2	2	2	2	2	4	7	10	13	14	17	18
Nangongyuan 南公园	3	2	2	2	2	3	6	9	12	13	16	17
Sanchajie 三叉街	3	3	2	2	2	3	6	9	12	13	16	17
Difengjiang 帝封江	4	4	4	3	3	2	3	6	9	10	13	14
Xiangqian 祥谦	7	7	7	6	6	3	2	3	7	7	10	12
Shouzhan 首占	10	10	10	9	9	6	3	2	4	4	7	9
Dashuju 大数据	13	13	13	12	12	9	7	4	2	2	3	5
Binhai CBD 滨海中央商务区	14	14	14	13	13	10	7	4	2	2	3	4
Airport 机场	17	17	17	16	16	13	10	7	3	3	2	2
Wenling 文岭	18	18	18	17	17	14	12	9	5	4	2	2
