= Fuzhou railway station =

Railway station in Fuzhou, Fujian, China

Fuzhou 福州
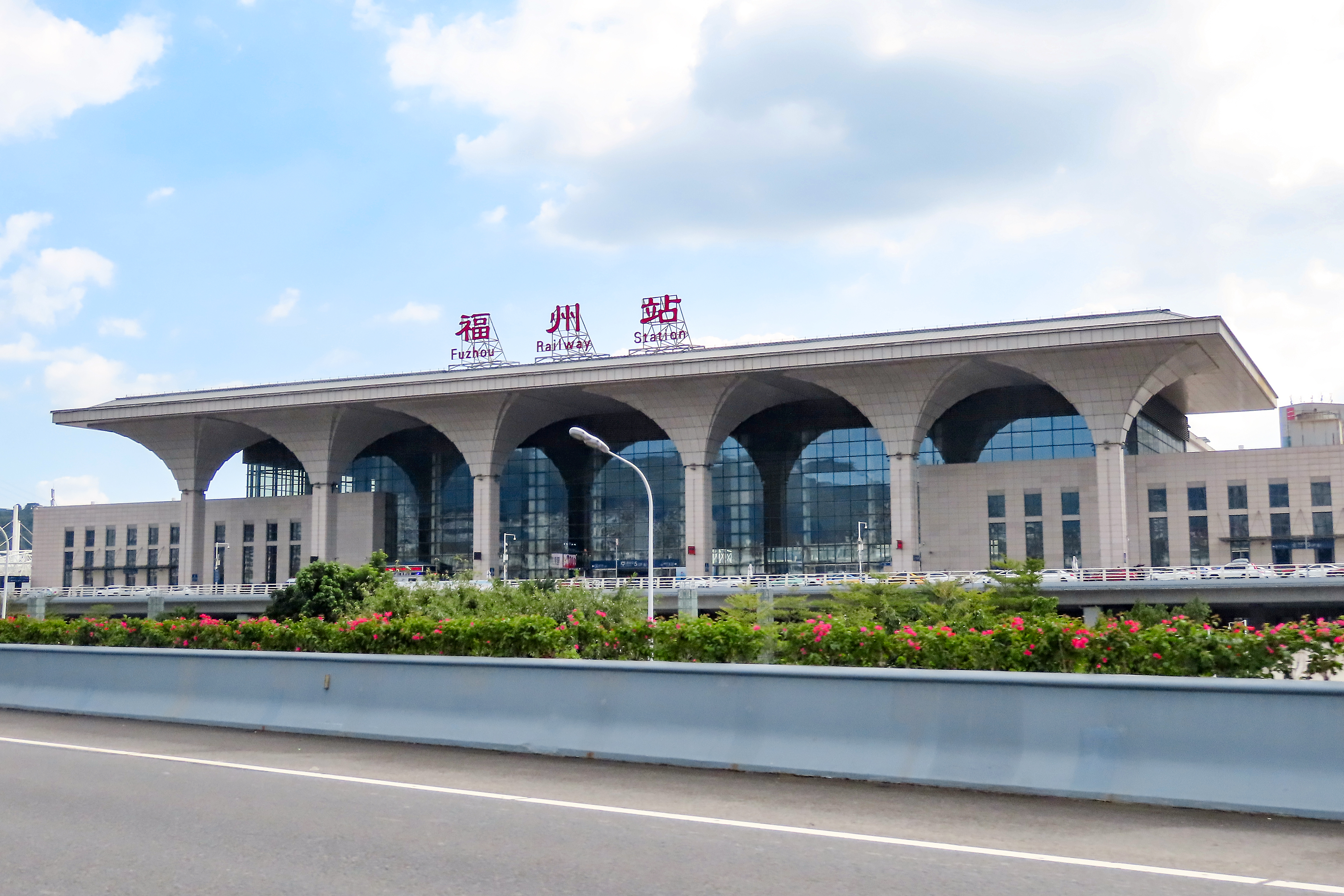
- North building of Fuzhou railway station, completed in 2014

General information
- Location: Jin'an District, Fuzhou, Fujian; China
- Operated by: CR Nanchang; Fuzhou Metro
- Lines: Wenzhou–Fuzhou railway Nanping–Fuzhou railway Fuzhou–Xiamen railway Hefei–Fuzhou high-speed railway Fuzhou–Pingtan railway Fuzhou–Xiamen high-speed railway
- Platforms: 3 (5 tracks)
- Connections: Bus terminal

Other information
- Station code: 34682 (TMIS code); FZS (telegram code); FZH (pinyin code)

History
- Opened: 1958; 6 January 2017
Location

Fuzhou railway station (Chinese: 福州站; pinyin: Fúzhōu Zhàn, also spelled Fúzhōu Huǒchē Zhàn or Fuzhou Huochezhan) is a metro station and a railway station located in Fuzhou, Fujian Province, China, at the junction of the Wenzhou–Fuzhou railway, Nanping–Fuzhou railway, and Fuzhou–Xiamen railway which are operated by the Nanchang Railway Bureau of the China Railway Corporation.

== History ==
The station was opened in 1958 and expanded in 2004. From May 2016 it is served by the Line 1 of Fuzhou Metro.

== Service ==
=== China Railway ===
Fuzhou railway station (Chinese: 福州站) is a railway station in Jin'an District, Fuzhou, Fujian, China.

=== Fuzhou Metro ===
Fuzhou Railway Station 福州火车站
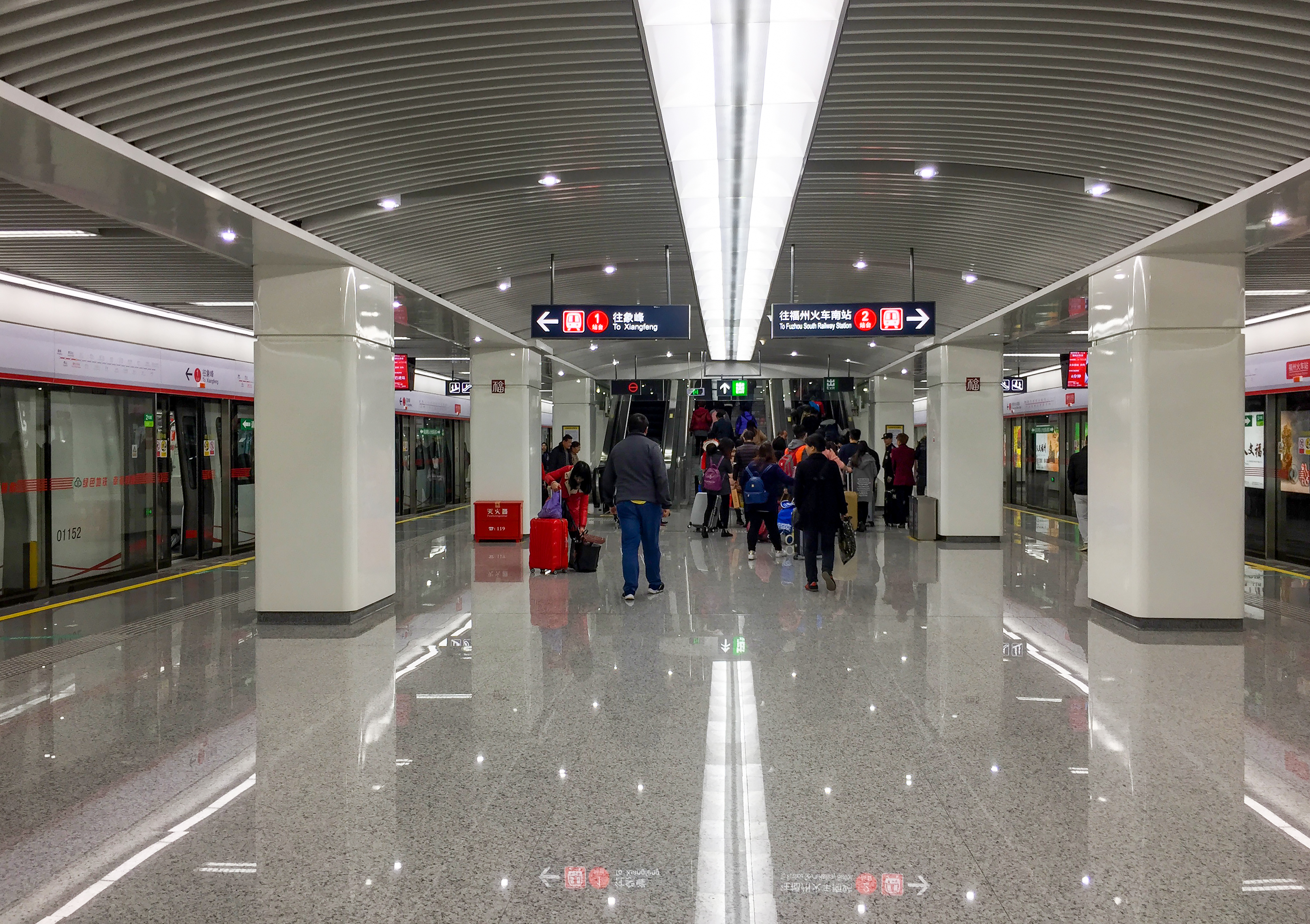

General information
- Location: Jin'an District, Fuzhou, Fujian; China
- Coordinates: 26.1157°N 119.3135°E
- Operated by: Fuzhou Metro
- Lines: Line 1 Binhai Express
- Platforms: 2

History
- Opened: Line 1: 6 January 2017; Binhai Express: 29 September 2025

Services
Preceding station	Fuzhou Metro	Following station
Luohanshan towards Xiangfeng	Line 1	Doumen towards Sanjiangkou
Terminus	Binhai Express	Dongmen towards Wenling
Location

Fuzhou Railway Station (Chinese: 福州火车站; pinyin: Fúzhōu huǒchēzhàn zhàn; Fuzhounese: [huʔ˨˩ t͡siu˥˥ huoi˨˩ ʒia˥˧ ʒiɑŋ˨˦˨]) is a station of Line 1 and Binhai Express line of the Fuzhou Metro. It is located underground of CR railway station. This station started operation on 6 January 2017.

== See also ==
- Fuzhou South railway station
