= Fuzhou Xinhai Revolution Memorial Hall =

Museum in Fuzhou, Fujian, China

- Established: November 9, 1991
- Location: No. 17 Yangqiao East Road, Gulou District, Fuzhou City

The Fuzhou Xinhai Revolution Memorial Hall (simplified Chinese: 福州辛亥革命纪念馆; traditional Chinese: 福州辛亥革命紀念館) is a thematic memorial hall built to commemorate the Xinhai Revolution. Located at No. 17 Yangqiao East Road, Gulou District, Fuzhou City, the memorial hall was officially opened to the public on November 9, 1991. Its first director was Li Houwei. The Memorial Hall belongs to the Fuzhou Cultural Relics Management Committee.

On May 31, 1991, the restoration project of Former Residence of Lin Juemin began, and on November 9, the day of the 80th anniversary of the Xinhai Revolution in Fuzhou, the Former Residence was completely restored and turned into the Fuzhou Xinhai Revolution Memorial Hall.

On September 14, 2011, the Fuzhou Xinhai Revolution Memorial Hall was set up as the "Fujian Federation of Overseas Chinese Patriotism Education Base".
