= Yingqian station =

Metro station in Fuzhou, China

Yingqian 营前
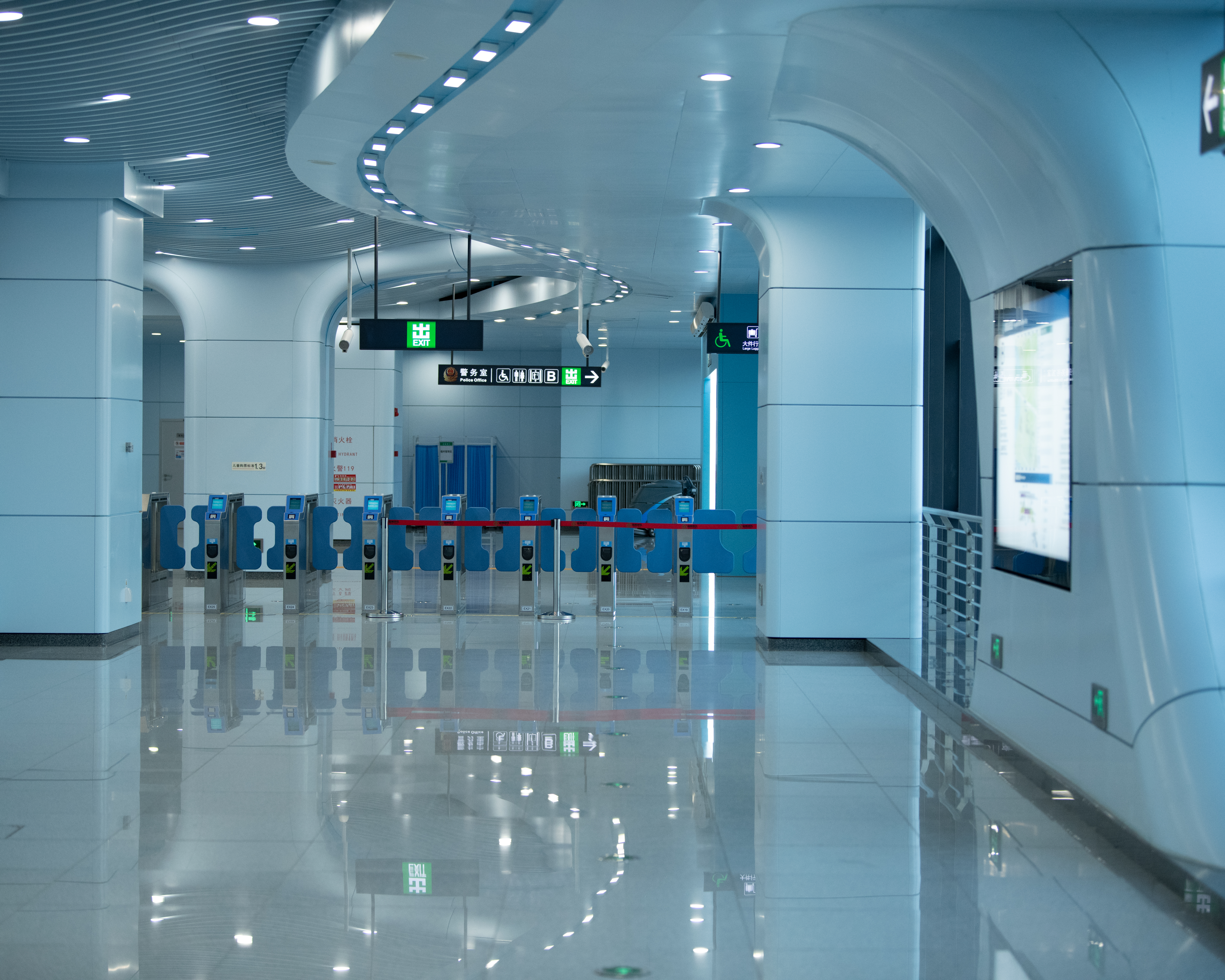
- Concourse of Yingqian Station

General information
- Location: Changle District, Fuzhou, Fujian; China
- Coordinates: 25.959898°N 119.468441°E
- Operator: Fuzhou Metro Co., Ltd.
- Line: Line 6
- Platforms: 2

Construction
- Structure type: Elevated

Services
Preceding station	Fuzhou Metro	Following station
Xiayang towards Pandun	Line 6	Hangcheng towards Wanshou
Location

Yingqian Station (Chinese: 营前站; pinyin: Yíngqián zhàn; Fuzhounese: Iàng-sèng) is a metro station of Line 6 of the Fuzhou Metro. It is located on the intersection of G316 and Yingzhou Road in Changle District, Fuzhou, Fujian, China. It is the first elevated metro station in Fuzhou Metro, also the first metro station in Changle District.

== Station layout ==
L3

Platforms

Platform 1
← Line 6 towards Pandun (Xiayang)
Island platform, doors will open on the left
Platform 2
Line 6 towards Wanshou (Hangcheng)→
L2

Concourse
Customer Service, Automatic Ticketing Machines
G
Street level
Exits

== Exits ==
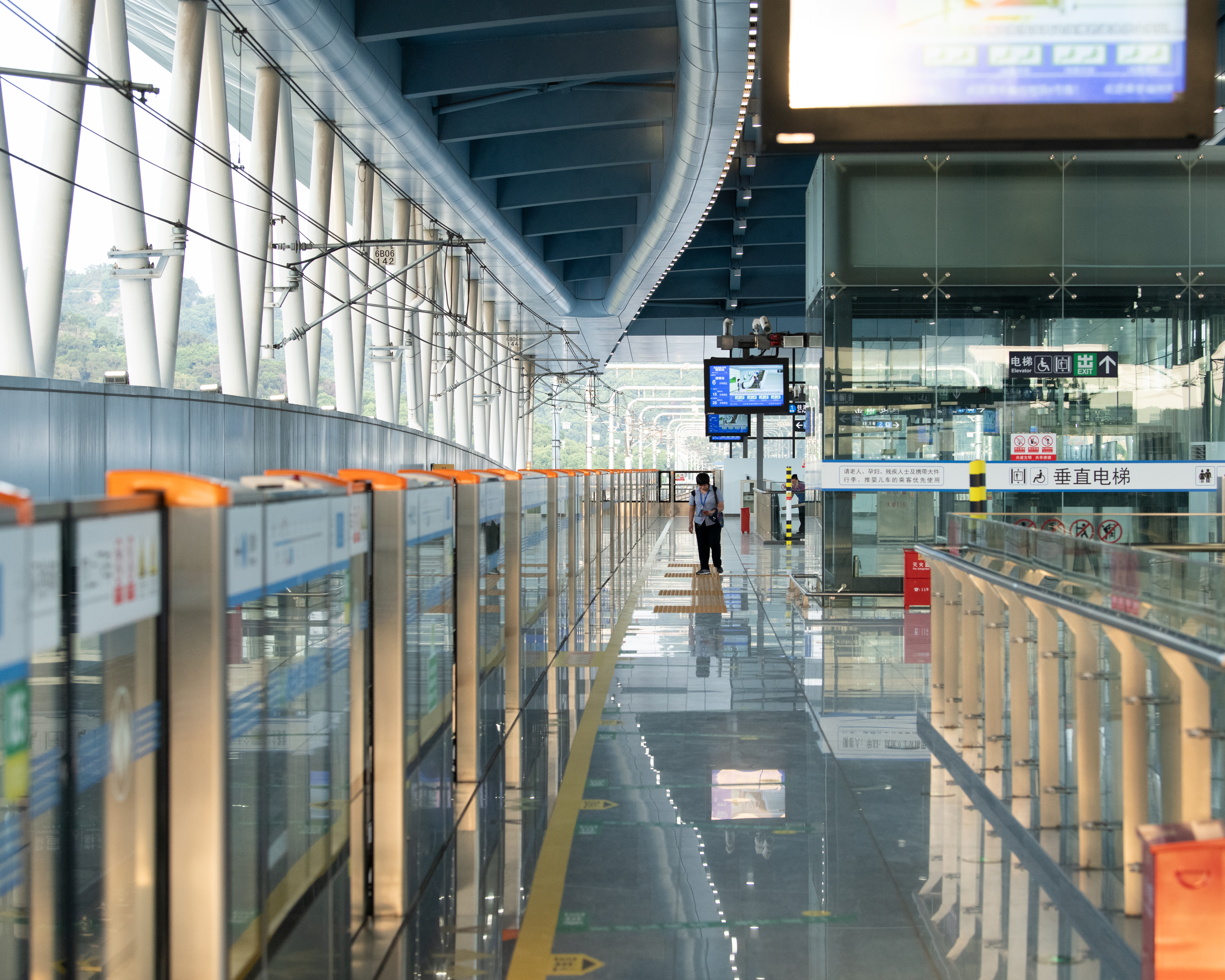
Platform of Yingqian Station
