= Line 6 (Fuzhou Metro) =

Metro line in Fuzhou, Fujian, China

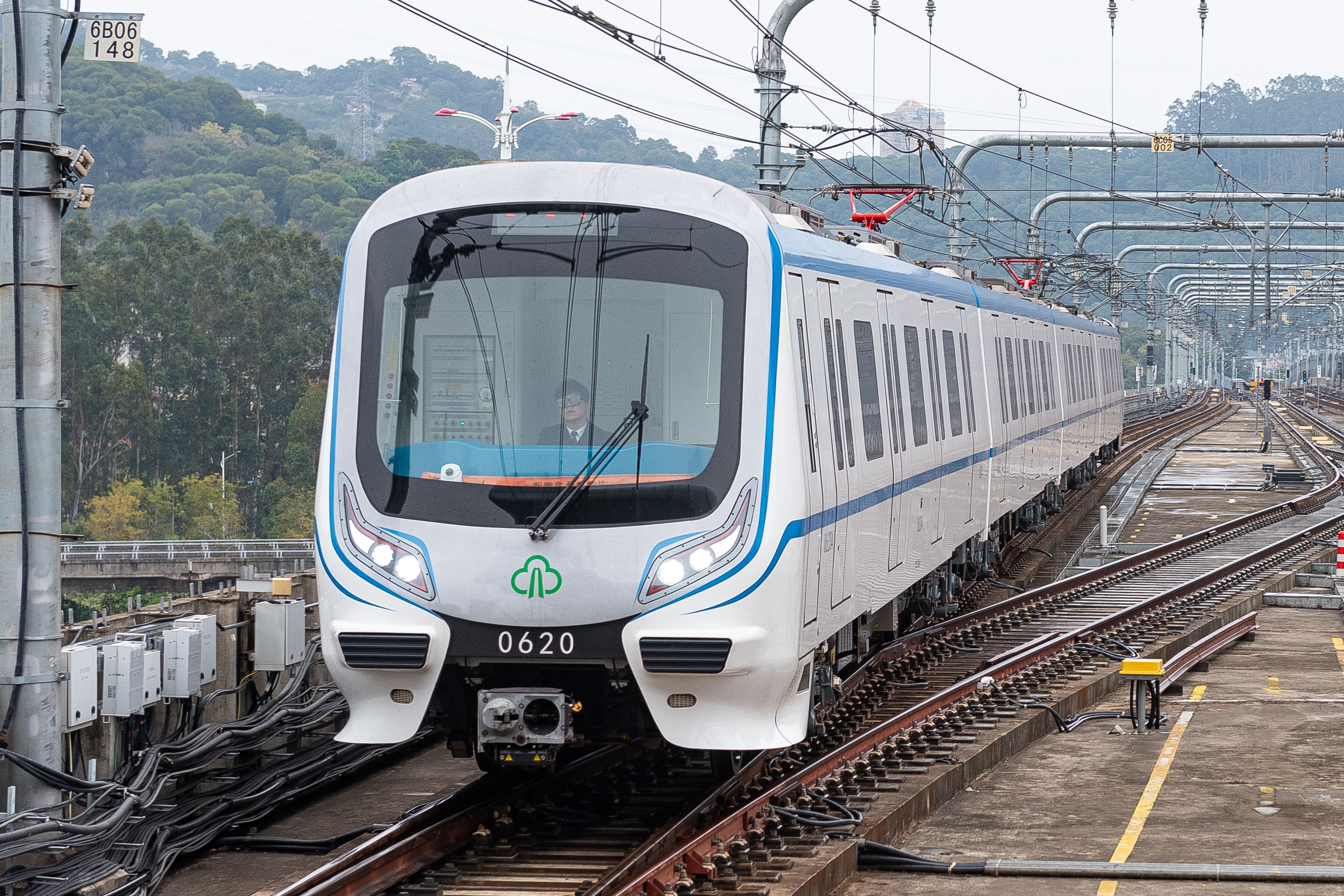
- Line 6 train at Yingqian station

Overview
- Status: In Operation (Phase 1)
- Owner: City of Fuzhou
- Locale: Fuzhou, Fujian, China
- Termini: Pandun; Wanshou (Phase 1)
- Stations: 16 (Phase 1)
- Website: http://www.fzmtr.com

Service
- Type: Rapid transit
- System: Fuzhou Metro
- Services: 2
- Operator(s): Fuzhou Metro Co., Ltd.

History
- Opened: 28 August 2022; 4 years ago

Technical
- Line length: 31.346 km (19.48 mi) (Phase 1)
- Number of tracks: 2
- Character: Underground and Elevated
- Track gauge: 1,435 mm
- Electrification: Overhead lines 1,500 V DC
- Operating speed: 100 km/h (62 mph)

Line 6 of the Fuzhou Metro (simplified Chinese: 福州地铁6号线; traditional Chinese: 福州地鐵6號線; pinyin: Fúzhōu Dìtiě Liù Hào Xiàn) runs from Cangshan District to Changle District. Line 6's color is blue. Phase 1 of the line opened on 28 August 2022.

== Sections ==
=== Phase 1 ===
Phase 1 of Line 6 starts at Pandun station and ends at Wanshou station. The total length is 31.346 km. There are 16 stations in the section, including 1 elevated station and 15 underground stations. Construction began at the end of 2016. Phase 1 of the line opened on 28 August 2022.

=== Phase 2 ===
Phase 2 extension to Shibakongzha station is under construction.

== Stations ==
Station name		Transfer	Distance km	Location	Section
English	Chinese	Transfer	Distance km	Location	Section
Pandun	潘墩			Cangshan	Phase 1
Linpu	林浦	4		Cangshan	Phase 1
Zhanglan	樟岚			Cangshan	Phase 1
Liangcuo	梁厝	1		Cangshan	Phase 1
Xiayang	下洋	1		Cangshan	Phase 1
Yingqian	营前			Changle	Phase 1
Hangcheng	航城			Changle	Phase 1
Zhenghe	郑和			Changle	Phase 1
Shiyang	十洋			Changle	Phase 1
Wuhang	吴航			Changle	Phase 1
Heshang	鹤上			Changle	Phase 1
Shajing	沙京			Changle	Phase 1
Lianhua	莲花			Changle	Phase 1
Xiawu	下吴			Changle	Phase 1
Hujing	壶井			Changle	Phase 1
Wanshou	万寿			Changle	Phase 1
Wansha / Sanzhong Binhai	万沙·三中滨海			Changle	Phase 2
Binhai CBD	滨海中央商务区	Binhai Express		Changle	Phase 2
Shawei	沙尾			Changle	Phase 2
Wenwusha / Guoji Xuexiao	文武砂·国际学校			Changle	Phase 2
Shibakongzha	十八孔闸			Changle	Phase 2

== See also ==
- Fuzhou Metro
