= Line 4 (Fuzhou Metro) =

Metro line in Fuzhou, Fujian, China

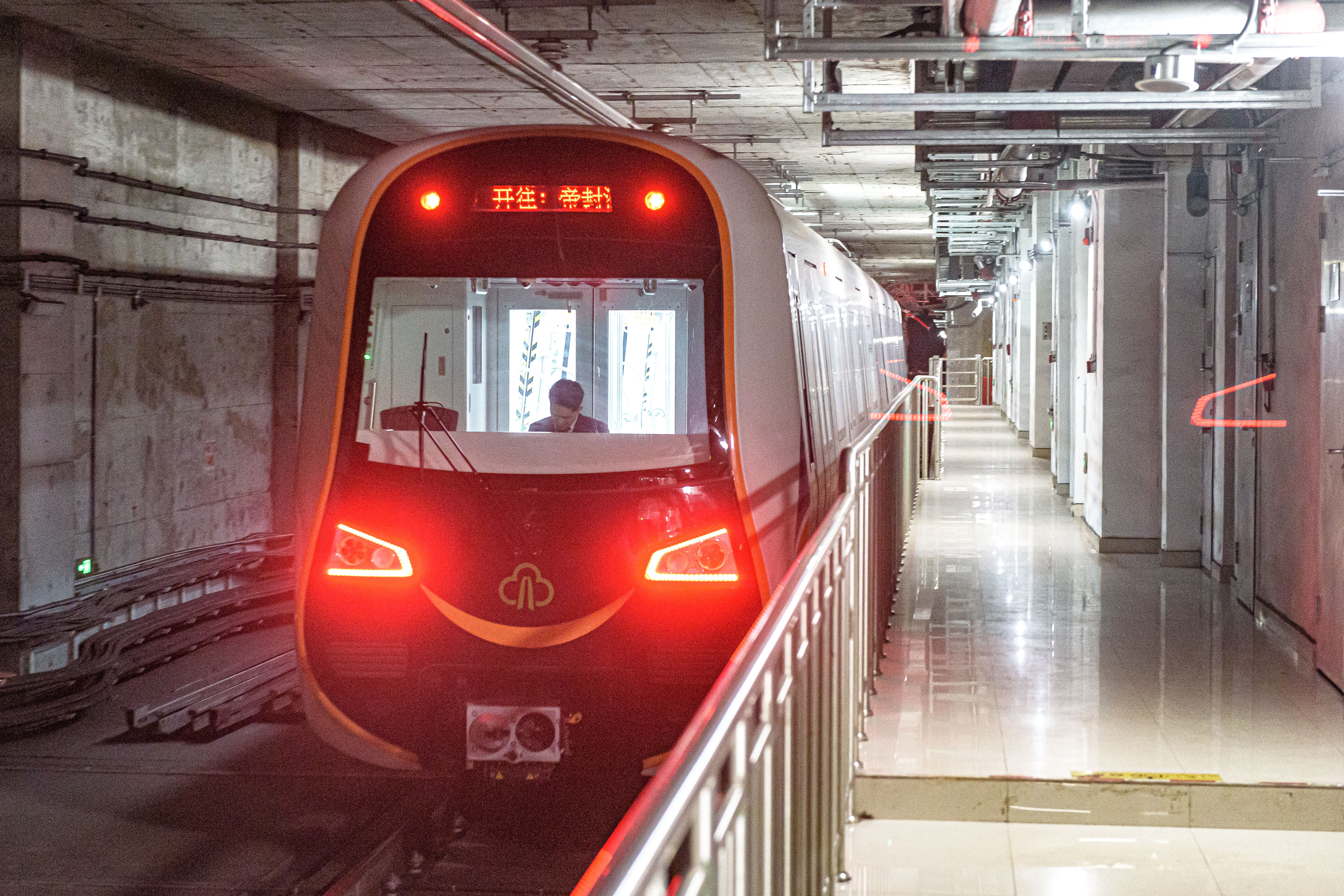
- A Line 4 train at Difengjiang station

Overview
- Status: Operational
- Owner: City of Fuzhou
- Locale: Fuzhou, Fujian, China
- Termini: Banzhou; Difengjiang
- Stations: 23 (in operation, Full Phase 1)

Service
- Type: Rapid transit
- System: Fuzhou Metro
- Services: 1
- Operator(s): Fuzhou Metro Co., Ltd.

History
- Opened: 27 August 2023 (Fenghuangchi to Difengjiang); 10 December 2025 (Fenghuangchi to Banzhou)

Technical
- Line length: 28.4 km (17.65 mi) (in operation, Full Phase 1)
- Number of tracks: 2
- Character: Underground
- Track gauge: 1,435 mm (4 ft 8 1/2 in)
- Electrification: Overhead lines, 1,500 V DC
- Operating speed: 80 km/h (50 mph)

Line 4 of the Fuzhou Metro (Chinese: 福州地铁4号线; pinyin: Fúzhōu Dìtiě Sì Hào Xiàn) is a metro line in Fuzhou. It starts at Fenghuangchi and ends at Difengjiang. The total length is 28.4 km (24 km in operation). Line 4's color is ■ orange. The section from Fenghuangchi to Difengjiang opened on 27 August 2023. An extension from Fenghuangchi to Banzhou opened on 10 December 2025.

== Stations ==

=== Phase 1 ===
Station name		Platform Types	Transfer	Distance km	Location
English	Chinese	Platform Types	Transfer	Distance km	Location
Banzhou	半洲	Island (Underground)			Cangshan
Jianxin	建新	Island (Underground)			Cangshan
Hongtang	洪塘	Island (Underground)	5		Cangshan
Jinniushan	金牛山	Island (Underground)			Gulou
Fenghuangchi	凤凰池	Island (Underground)			Gulou
Luzhuang	陆庄	Island (Underground)			Gulou
Ximen	西门	Island (Underground)			Gulou
Dongjiekou	东街口	Island (Underground)	1		Gulou
Provincial Hospital	省立医院	Island (Underground)			Gulou
Dongmen	东门	Island (Underground)	Binhai Express		Gulou
Sanjiaochi	三角池	Island (Underground)			Jin'an
Zhuyu	竹屿	Island (Underground)			Jin'an
Hengyu	横屿	Island (Underground)			Jin'an
Houyu	后屿	Island (Underground)			Jin'an
Qianyu	前屿	Island (Underground)	2		Jin'an
Guangminggang	光明港	Island (Underground)			Jin'an
Aofengzhou	鳌峰洲	Island (Underground)			Taijiang
Huahai Park	花海公园	Island (Underground)			Cangshan
Exhibition Center	会展中心	Island (Underground)			Cangshan
Linpu	林浦	Island (Underground)	6		Cangshan
Chengmen	城门	Island (Underground)	1		Cangshan
Luozhou Hot Spring	螺洲温泉	Island (Underground)			Cangshan
Difengjiang	帝封江	Island (Underground)	5 Binhai Express		Cangshan

=== Phase 2 ===
Phase 2 of Line 4 has not been approved by the NDRC. The station list will be added after the NDRC approval.
