= Gushan station =

Gushan station may refer to the follow stations:

== Railway Station ==
- Gushan railway station (Taiwan) (鼓山站), a railway station in Kaohsiung, Taiwan
- Gushan railway station (Shanxi) (孤山站), a railway station in Datong, Shanxi, China
- Gushan railway station (Hunan) (谷山站), a railway station on Changsha–Zhuzhou–Xiangtan intercity railway in Changsha, Hunan, China

== Metro Station ==
- Gushan station (Fuzhou Metro) (鼓山站), a metro station in Fuzhou, Fujian, China

== See also ==
- Gushan (disambiguation)
