= Antai Subdistrict, Fuzhou =

Antai Subdistrict 安泰街道
- Subdistrict
- Location in Fujian Antai (China)
- Coordinates: 26°4′54″N 119°17′55″E
- Country: People's Republic of China
- Province: Fujian
- Prefecture-level city: Fuzhou
- District: Gulou District
- Time zone: UTC+8 (China Standard)

Antai Subdistrict (Chinese: 安泰街道; pinyin: Āntài Jiēdào) is a subdistrict in Gulou District, Fuzhou, Fujian province, China. As of 2020, it administers the following four residential neighborhoods:

- Wuyi Square Community (五一广场社区)
- Wushan Community (乌山社区)
- Wuta Community (乌塔社区)
- Yushan Community (于山社区)

== See also ==
- List of township-level divisions of Fujian
