= Line 5 (Fuzhou Metro) =

Line of Fuzhou Metro

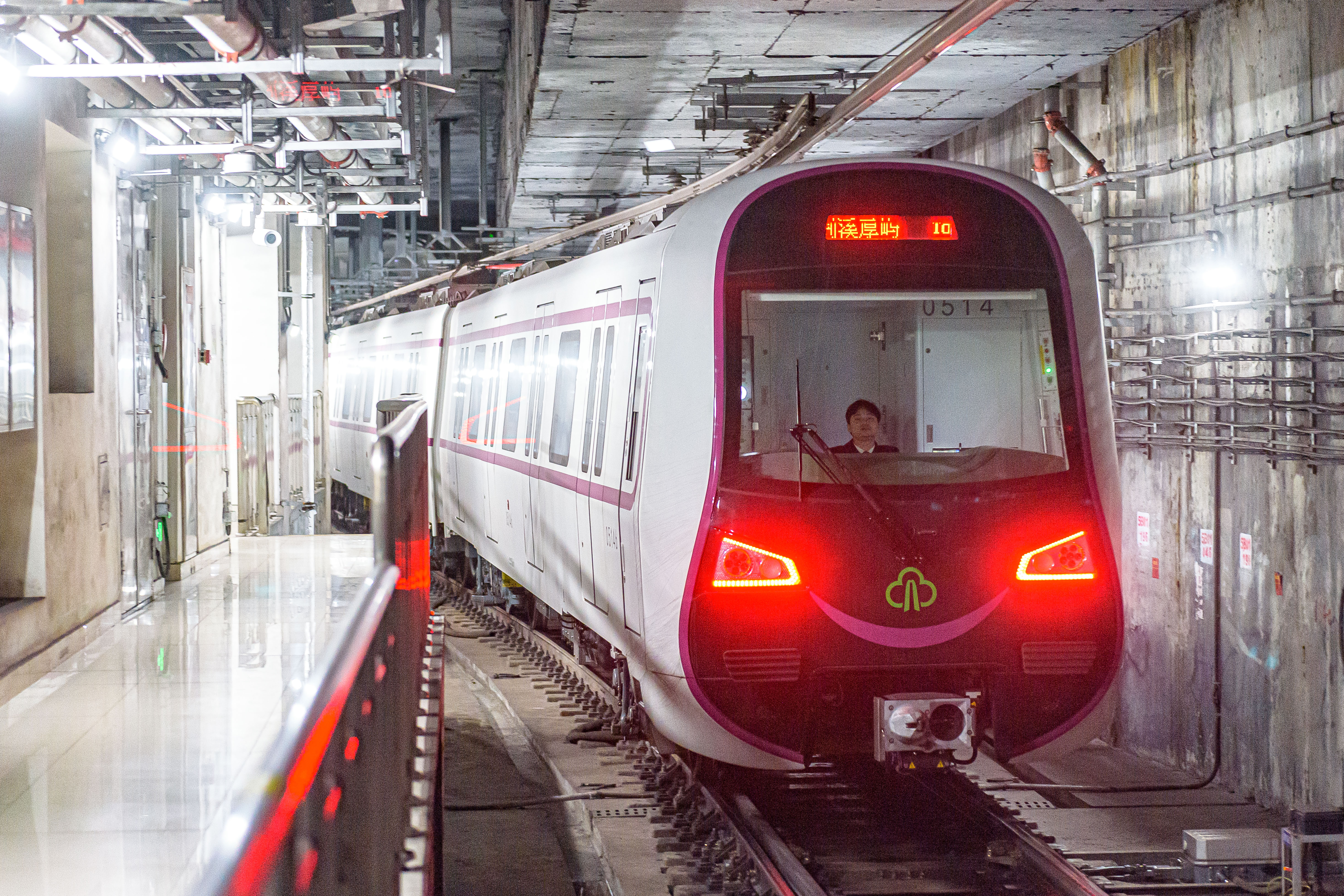
- A train of Line 5 at Jingxi Houyu station

Overview
- Status: Operational
- Owner: City of Fuzhou
- Locale: Fuzhou, Fujian Province, China
- Termini: Jingxi Houyu; Ancient Luozhou Town
- Stations: 20

Service
- Type: Rapid transit
- System: Fuzhou Metro
- Services: 1
- Operator(s): Fuzhou Metro Co., Ltd.

History
- Opened: 29 April 2022; 3 years ago

Technical
- Line length: 22.4 km (13.92 mi)
- Number of tracks: 2
- Character: Underground
- Track gauge: 1,435 mm (4 ft 8 1/2 in)
- Electrification: Overhead lines, 1,500 V DC
- Operating speed: 80 km/h (50 mph)
Route map

Line 5 of the Fuzhou Metro (Chinese: 福州地铁5号线; pinyin: Fúzhōu Dìtiě Wǔ Hào Xiàn) is a metro line in Fuzhou. It starts at Jingxi Houyu and as of February 2023, ends at Ancient Luozhou Town, with a total length of 22.4 km (13.9 mi). The line opened on 29 April 2022. The opening of a further section from Ancient Luozhou Town to Fuzhou South railway station, which will extend the line's length to 27.7 km (17.2 mi), was delayed due to the delay of the reconstruction of the train station for the Fuzhou–Xiamen high-speed railway, which is expected to re-open in the second half of 2023. Line 5's color is ■ purple.

== Opening timeline ==
Segment	Commencement	Length	Station(s)	Name
Jingxi Houyu — Ancient Luozhou Town	29 April 2022	22.4 km (13.92 mi)	17	Phase 1
Ancient Luozhou Town — Fuzhou South Railway Station	27 August 2023	5.3 km (3.29 mi)	3	Phase 1

== Stations ==

Station name		Platform Types	Connections	Distance km		Location
English	Chinese	Platform Types	Connections	Distance km		Location
Jingxi Houyu	荆溪厚屿	Island (Underground)		0.00	0.00	Minhou Co.
Agriculture and Forestry University	农林大学	Island (Underground)		3.21	3.21	Cangshan
Hongtang	洪塘	Island (Underground)	4	1.40	4.61	Cangshan
Zhenban	阵坂	Island (Underground)		0.90	5.51	Cangshan
Marong	马榕	Island (Underground)		1.65	7.16	Cangshan
Jinshan	金山	Island (Underground)	2	1.06	8.22	Cangshan
Fenggangli	凤冈里	Island (Underground)		1.11	9.33	Cangshan
Pushang Dadao	浦上大道	Island (Underground)		0.79	10.12	Cangshan
Xiajing	霞镜	Island (Underground)		1.07	11.19	Cangshan
Dongling	东岭	Island (Underground)		1.26	12.45	Cangshan
Taiyu	台屿	Island (Underground)		1.01	13.46	Cangshan
Panyu	盘屿	Island (Underground)		1.40	14.86	Cangshan
Wushan	吴山	Island (Underground)		1.85	16.71	Cangshan
Gaishan Zhulan	盖山竹榄	Island (Underground)		1.24	17.95	Cangshan
Yixu	义序	Island (Underground)		1.16	19.11	Cangshan
Difengjiang	帝封江	2 Island platforms (Underground)	4 Binhai Express	0.84	19.95	Cangshan
Ancient Luozhou Town	螺洲古镇	Island (Underground)		1.58	21.53	Cangshan
Qianjin	前锦	Island (Underground)		1.16	22.69	Cangshan
Longjiang	龙江	Island (Underground)		0.97	23.66	Cangshan
Fuzhou South Railway Station	福州火车南站	Island (Underground)	1	3.50	27.16	Cangshan
