= Jingjiang Lonely Hill =

Hill in Jiangsu, China

Coordinates: 32°3′56.7″N 120°18′12.2″E

The Lonely Hill (Chinese: 孤山; pinyin: Gūshān) is a natural feature on the south side of Gushan Town, a northern suburb of Jingjiang City, in China's Jiangsu Province. Located about 5–6 km. north of Jingjiang's city center, it is one of the city's main nature areas.

== Name origin ==
Jinjiang - and most of the central Jiangsu region - is situated on the Yangtze River's alluvial plain. The terrain here is generally very flat. A small isolated hill, located some 6 km north of the Yangtze, is the only hill within a large area. For this reason, the hill has become a well-known topographic feature in the region, and received its name, "Lonely Hill" (Gushan). Thousands of years ago, before the Yangtze Delta we know today had formed, the Lonely Hill was a small island in the Yangtze estuary, and the only piece of dry land within the boundaries of today's Jingjiang county-level city. It is thought that it was not until 1488 that it became fully surrounded by land.

The Buddhist temple on top of the hill (Gushan Si, "The Lonely Hill Temple") and the adjacent town (Gushan Town) received their names from the hill.

== Description ==
It is said to look like a sitting lion, with the height of 53 meters and the total area is 5.8 hectares, or 50,000 square meters. The Lonely Hill is covered with old trees, flowers and bushes. It is said that Lonely Hill formed 1800 years ago.

The Gushan Revolutionary Martyrs' Cemetery is located on the hill's western slope; it occupies 107 mu (about 18 acres). According to a recent count, 1522 people are buried there, including 1 participant of peasant wars, 336 participants of the Second Sino-Japanese War, 998 participants of the Chinese Civil War, 106 participants of the Korean War, and 81 people who perished during the socialist construction.
