= Gushan-e Bala =

Gushan-e Bala گوشان بالا
- Village
- Location within Iran
- Coordinates: 28°33′12″N 60°47′42″E
- Country: Iran
- Province: Sistan and Baluchestan
- County: Khash
- Bakhsh: Nukabad
- Rural District: Eskelabad

Population (2006)
  - Total: 58
- Time zone: UTC+3:30 (IRST)
  - Summer (DST): UTC+4:30 (IRDT)

Gushan-e Bala (Persian: گوشان بالا, also Romanized as Gūshān-e Bālā; also known as Gūshān) is a village in Eskelabad Rural District, Nukabad District, Khash County, Sistan and Baluchestan Province, Iran. At the 2006 census, its population was 58, in 8 families.
