= Yangli station =

Metro station in Fuzhou, China

Yangli 洋里
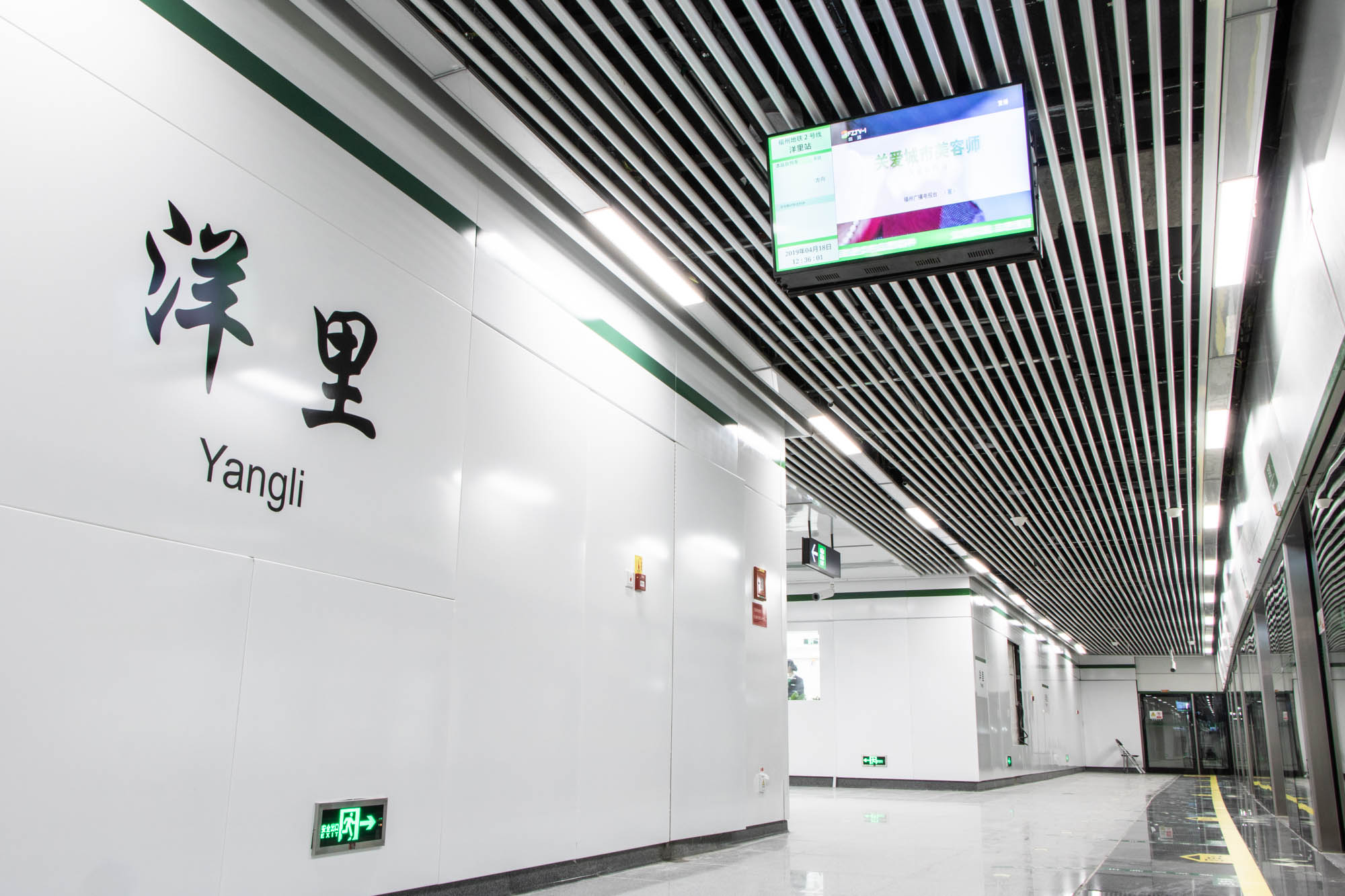

General information
- Location: Jin'an District, Fuzhou, Fujian; China
- Coordinates: 26.0473655°N 119.3673515°E
- Operated by: Fuzhou CETC Rail Transit Co., Ltd..
- Line(s): Line 2
- Platforms: 2

Construction
- Structure type: Underground

History
- Opened: April 26, 2019

Services
Preceding station	Fuzhou Metro	Following station
Gushan towards Suyang	Line 2	Terminus

Yangli Station (Chinese: 洋里站; pinyin: Yánglǐ zhàn; Fuzhounese: [yoŋ˧ lie˧]) is a metro station of Line 2 of the Fuzhou Metro. It is the current eastern terminus on the line and located near Liuyi Garden and Yangli Xinyuan, Jin'an District, Fuzhou, Fujian, China. It started operation on April 26, 2019.

== Station layout ==
G	Street Level	Exits
B1	East Concource	Customer Service, Automatic Ticketing Machines
B1	Side platform, doors will open on the right
B1	Platform 1	← Line 2 towards Suyang (Gushan)
B1	Platform 2	Line 2 termination track (alighting passengers only)
B1	Side platform, doors will open on the right
B1	West Concourse	Customer Service, Automatic Ticketing Machines
B2	Connecting Level	Platforms-connecting Passage

== Exits ==
Exit number	Exit location
Exit A	Northeast of the station
Exit B	Northwest of the station
Exit C	Southwest of the station
Exit D	Southeast of the station
