= Suyang station (Fuzhou Metro) =

Metro station in Fuzhou, China

Suyang 苏洋
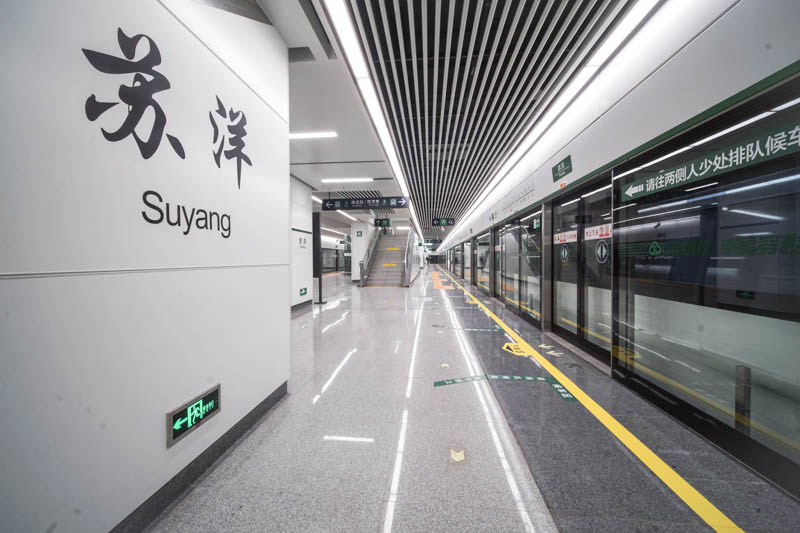
- The station platform

General information
- Location: Minhou County, Fuzhou, Fujian; China
- Coordinates: 26.1062805°N 119.1468041°E
- Operated by: Fuzhou CETC Rail Transit Co., Ltd..
- Line(s): Line 2
- Platforms: 2

Construction
- Structure type: Underground

History
- Opened: April 26, 2019

Services
Preceding station	Fuzhou Metro	Following station
Terminus	Line 2	Shadi towards Yangli

Suyang station (Chinese: 苏洋站; pinyin: Sūyáng zhàn; Fuzhounese: [su˥˥ yoŋ˥˧]) is a metro station on Line 2 of the Fuzhou Metro in Suyang Village, Minhou County, Fuzhou. It is the current western terminus on the line and located on the east of Zhuqi Depot, a depot of the line, and the north of G316 highway. It was opened on April 26, 2019.

== Station layout ==
Suyang station consists one island platform on the basement and a concourse on the ground.

2F	Reserved
G	Concourse	Exits, Ticketing, Automatic Ticketing Machines
B1; Platforms		← Line 2 termination track (alighting passengers only)
B1; Platforms	Island platform, doors will open on the left
B1; Platforms		Line 2 towards Yangli (Shadi)→

== Exits ==
Exit number	Exit location
Exit C	Southwest of the station
Exit D	Southeast of the station
