= Gulou, Fuzhou =

Settlement in Fuzhou, Fujian, China

Gulou 鼓楼区
- District
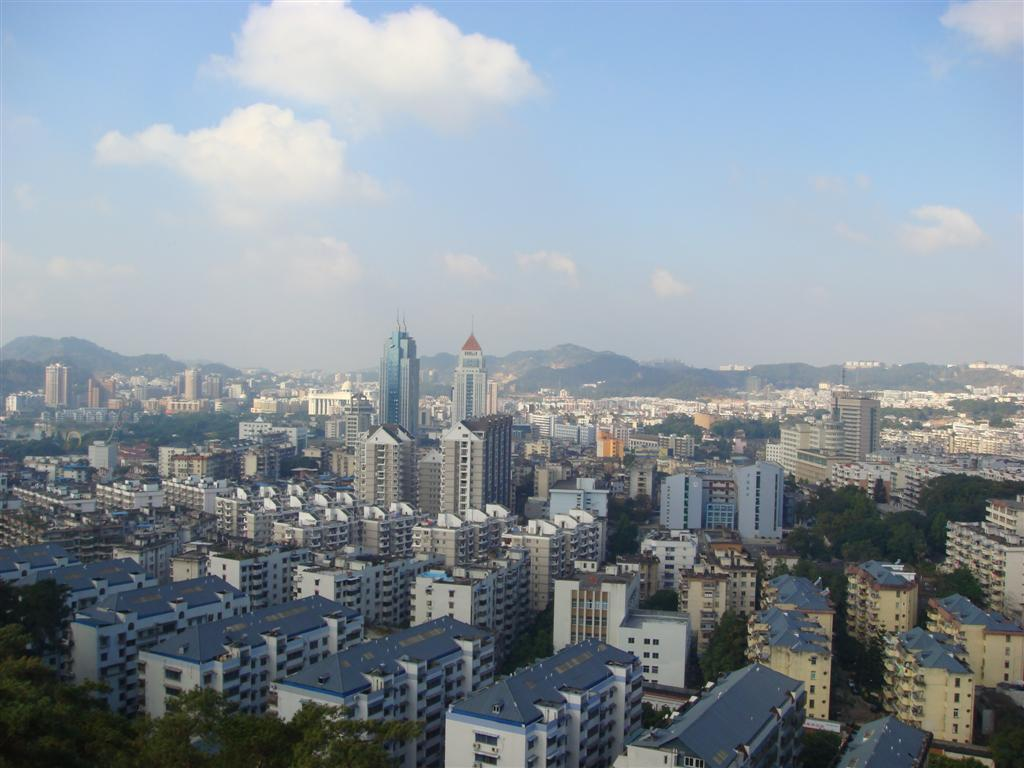

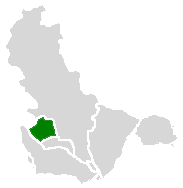
- Location in Fuzhou's core districts

- Location in Fujian
- Coordinates: 26°05′08″N 119°18′14″E
- Country: People's Republic of China
- Province: Fujian
- Prefecture-level city: Fuzhou

Area
  - Total: 35.43 km^{2} (13.68 sq mi)

Population (2020)
  - Total: 669,090
  - Density: 18,880/km^{2} (48,910/sq mi)
- Time zone: UTC+8 (China Standard)
- GDP (2020): CN¥ 206.986 billion (US$ 30 billion)
- GDP per capita (2020): CN¥ 309,350 (US$ 44,856)

Gulou (simplified Chinese: 鼓楼区; traditional Chinese: 鼓樓區; pinyin: Gǔlóu Qū; lit. 'Drumtower District') is one of 6 urban districts and the municipal seat of the prefecture-level city of Fuzhou, the capital of Fujian Province, China. As of 2020, Gulou has a total population of 669,090 residents.

== Administrative divisions ==
Gulou has nine sub-districts: Huada Subdistrict (华大街道), Gudong Subdistrict (鼓东街道), Guxi Subdistrict (鼓西街道), Nanjie Subdistrict (南街街道), Antai Subdistrict (安泰街道), Dongjie Subdistrict (东街街道), Shuibu Subdistrict (水部街道), Wenquan Subdistrict (温泉街道), and Wufeng Subdistrict (五凤街道) The only town is Hongshan (洪山镇).
