= Jin'an, Fuzhou =

Settlement in Fuzhou, Fujian, China

Jin'an 晋安区
- District
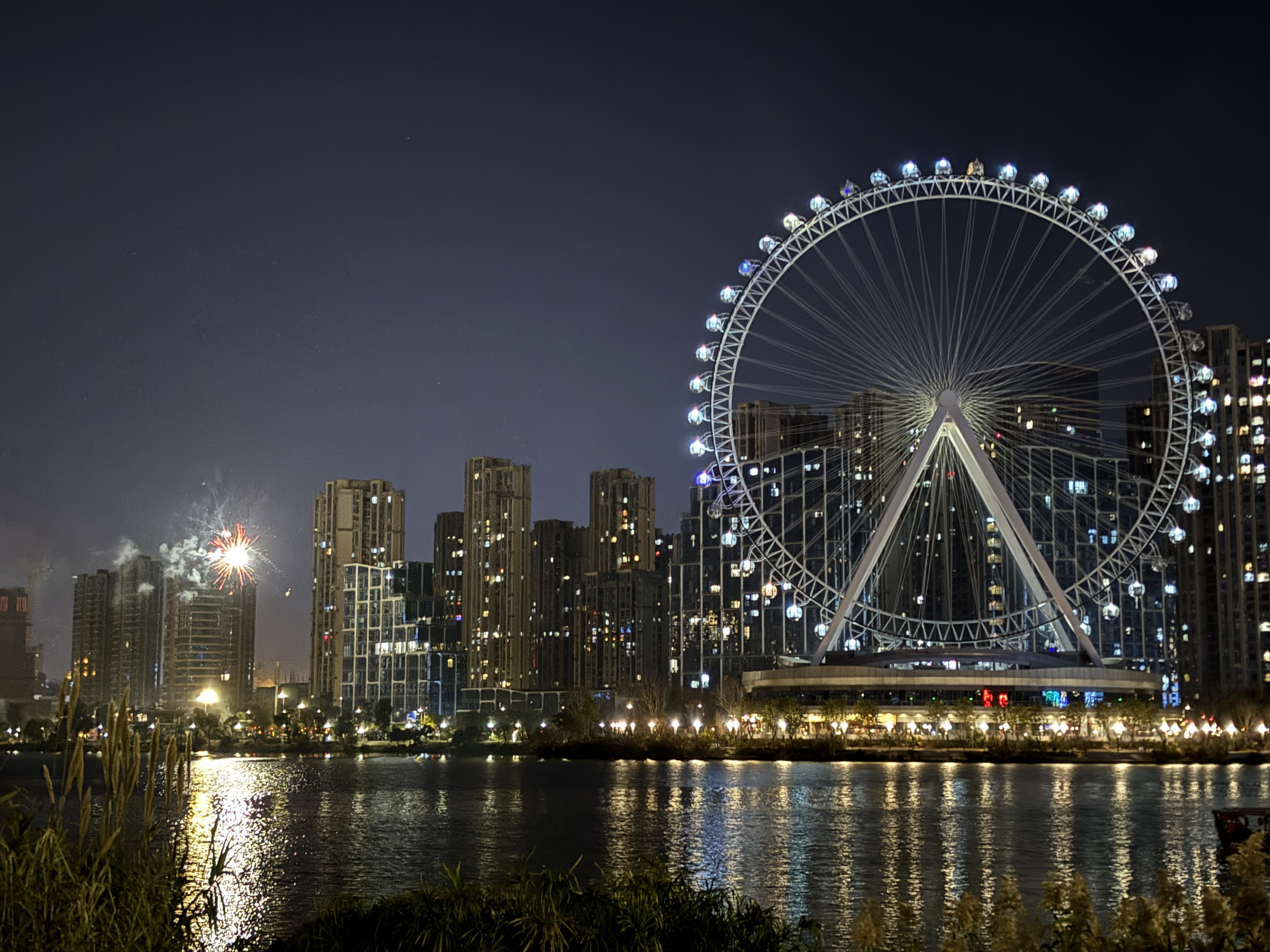

- Location in Fujian
- Coordinates: 26°06′19″N 119°19′52″E
- Country: People's Republic of China
- Province: Fujian
- Prefecture-level city: Fuzhou

Population (2020)
  - Total: 789,775
- Time zone: UTC+8 (China Standard)
- GDP (2020): CN¥ 98.5 billion

Jin'an (simplified Chinese: 晋安; traditional Chinese: 晉安; pinyin: Jìn'ān; Foochow Romanized: Céng-ăng) is one of six urban districts of the prefecture-level city of Fuzhou, the capital of Fujian Province, China.

== Administrative divisions ==
- Subdistricts:
- Chayuan Subdistrict (茶园街道), Wangzhuang Subdistrict (王庄街道), Xiangyuan Subdistrict (象园街道)
- Towns: Yuefeng (岳峰镇), Gushan (鼓山镇), Xindian (新店镇), Huanxi (宦溪镇)
- Townships: Shoushan Township (寿山乡) and Rixi Township (日溪乡)

== Climate ==
Climate data for Jin'an Fuzhou, elevation 26 m (85 ft), (1991–2020 normals)
Month	Jan	Feb	Mar	Apr	May	Jun	Jul	Aug	Sep	Oct	Nov	Dec	Year
Mean daily maximum °C (°F)	15.9 (60.6)	16.9 (62.4)	19.6 (67.3)	24.4 (75.9)	28.1 (82.6)	31.3 (88.3)	34.7 (94.5)	34.0 (93.2)	31.5 (88.7)	27.5 (81.5)	23.2 (73.8)	18.2 (64.8)	25.4 (77.8)
Daily mean °C (°F)	11.9 (53.4)	12.5 (54.5)	14.9 (58.8)	19.6 (67.3)	23.7 (74.7)	27.2 (81.0)	30.0 (86.0)	29.5 (85.1)	27.3 (81.1)	23.3 (73.9)	19.2 (66.6)	14.1 (57.4)	21.1 (70.0)
Mean daily minimum °C (°F)	9.2 (48.6)	9.7 (49.5)	11.8 (53.2)	16.2 (61.2)	20.6 (69.1)	24.3 (75.7)	26.7 (80.1)	26.3 (79.3)	24.3 (75.7)	20.4 (68.7)	16.4 (61.5)	11.2 (52.2)	18.1 (64.6)
Average precipitation mm (inches)	54.6 (2.15)	73.6 (2.90)	121.0 (4.76)	130.9 (5.15)	185.8 (7.31)	225.7 (8.89)	176.3 (6.94)	207.6 (8.17)	144.5 (5.69)	49.5 (1.95)	49.3 (1.94)	41.4 (1.63)	1,460.2 (57.48)
Average precipitation days (≥ 1.0 mm)	9.1	12.0	15.5	15.0	16.3	15.7	10.9	13.6	10.4	6.2	7.4	8.1	140.2
Average snowy days	0	0	0	0	0	0	0	0	0	0	0	0.1	0.1
Average relative humidity (%)	72	74	74	73	75	77	71	72	70	66	69	69	72
Mean monthly sunshine hours	92.5	83.7	101.6	120.0	125.1	142.0	222.0	191.3	153.9	146.9	106.2	105.0	1,590.2
Percentage possible sunshine	28	26	27	31	30	35	53	48	42	41	33	32	36
Source: China Meteorological Administration
