= Fuzhou Metro =

Rapid transit system in Fuzhou, China

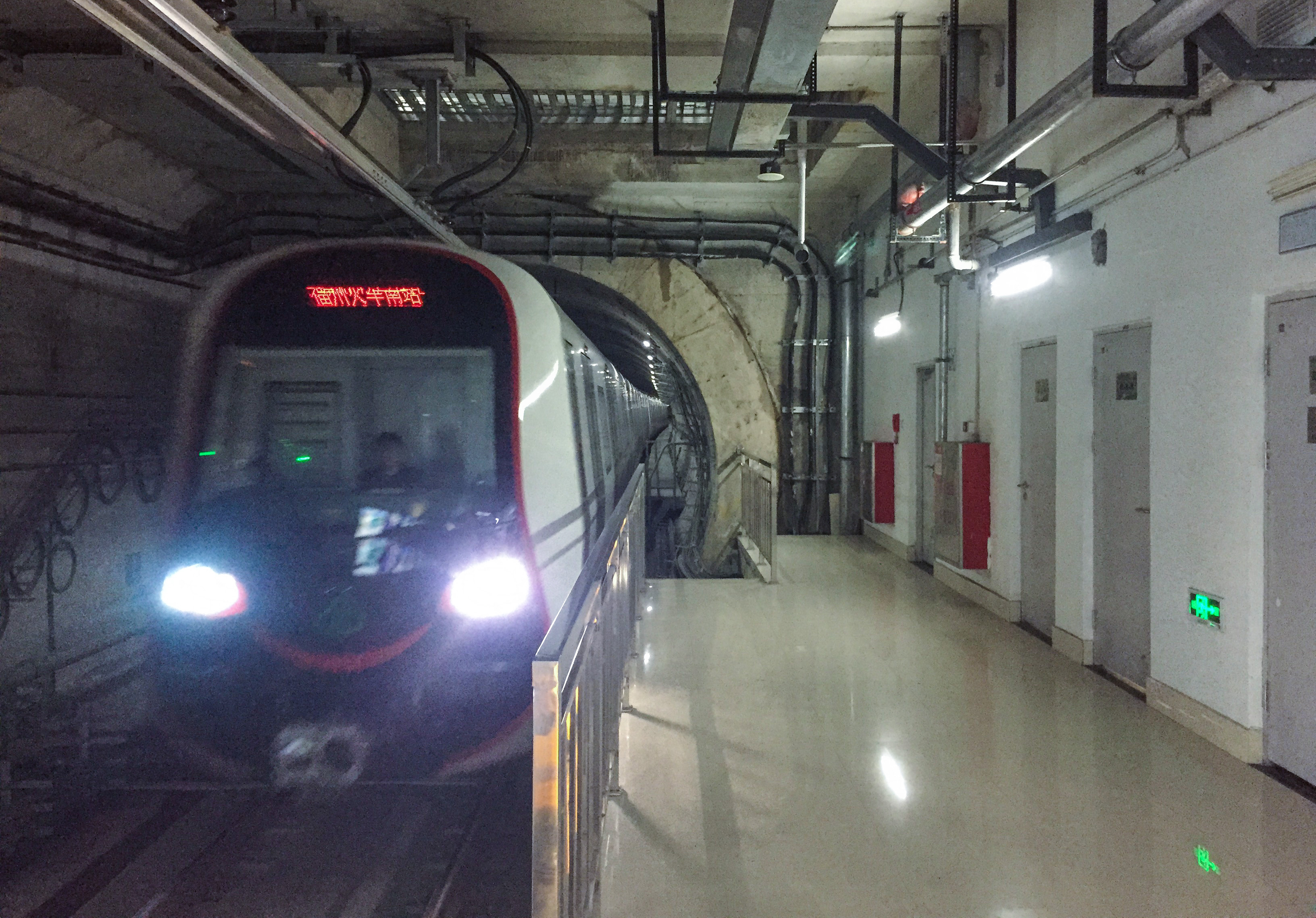

Overview
- Locale: Fuzhou, Fujian Province, China
- Transit type: Rapid transit
- Number of lines: 6
- Number of stations: 116
- Daily ridership: 1,480,600 (31/12/2025 peak, highest record)
- Website: http://www.fzmtr.com

Operation
- Began operation: May 18, 2016; 10 years ago
- Operators: Fuzhou Metro Group (Lines 1, 4, 5, 6, Binhai Express); Fuzhou CETC Rail Transit Co., Ltd. (Line 2)

Technical
- System length: 210.3 kilometres (130.7 mi)
System map

Fuzhou Metro
- Simplified Chinese: 福州地铁
- Traditional Chinese: 福州地鐵
Transcriptions
Standard Mandarin
- Hanyu Pinyin: Fúzhōu Dìtiě
Eastern Min
- Fuzhou BUC: Hók-ciŭ dê-tiék

The Fuzhou Metro (simplified Chinese: 福州地铁; traditional Chinese: 福州地鐵; pinyin: Fúzhōu Dìtiě) is a rapid transit system in Fuzhou Metropolitan Area, Fujian Province, China. The first line was planned to open in 2014. Due to the construction difficulties and accidental archaeologic finding, the southern section (9.76 km (6.06 mi)) was delayed to 2016 and the northern section (15.13 km (9.40 mi)) was delayed to 2017. Currently, the Fuzhou Metro Network consists of five lines. They are operated by Fuzhou Metro Group (Lines 1, 4, 5, 6), and Fuzhou CETC Rail Transit Company (Line 2), respectively.

Fuzhou Metro was approved for construction on 3 June 2009. Trial service closed to the public began on 30 December 2015 and lasted for three months. The first operational line (the south section of Line 1 from Sanchajie Station to Fuzhou South Railway Station) started service on 18 May 2016. As of January 2024, Fuzhou Metro has 167.5 km of route and 119 stations open to service.

== Lines ==
Map of Fuzhou Metro

=== Network ===
Line	Terminals (District/County)		Opening Date	Latest Extension	Length km	Stations
	Xiangfeng (Jin'an)	Sanjiangkou (Cangshan)	May 18, 2016	December 27, 2020	29.84	25
	Suyang (Minhou)	Yangli (Jin'an)	April 26, 2019	–	30.629	22
	Banzhou (Cangshan)	Difengjiang (Cangshan)	August 27, 2023	December 10, 2025	28.4	23
	Jingxi Houyu (Minhou)	Fuzhou South Railway Station (Cangshan)	April 29, 2022	August 27, 2023	27.7	20
	Pandun (Cangshan)	Wanshou (Changle)	August 28. 2022	–	31.346	14
( F1 )	Fuzhou Railway Station (Jin'an)	Wenling (Changle)	September 29, 2025	–	62.4	12
Total					210.3	116

==== Line 1 ====
The south section of Line 1 started service on May 18, 2016, the north section of the first phase opened on January 6, 2017, the second phase opened on December 27, 2020. This first phase is 24.89 km in length with 21 stations from Xiangfeng to Fuzhou South Railway Station. The second phase is 4.92 km in length with 4 stations from Fuzhou South Railway Station to Sanjiangkou.

==== Line 2 ====
The construction of Line 2 started on November 28, 2014. Line 2 is a 30.629 km long west-to-east line with 22 stations. The line opened on 26 April 2019. Line 2 operated by Fuzhou CETC Rail Transit Co., Ltd. under PPP contract. It's responsible for investment, construction, operation and maintenance of Line 2, with a concession period of 27 years effective from 30/11/2016.

==== Line 4 ====
The first section of Line 4 started service on August 27, 2023. This first phase is 27.7 km in length with 19 stations from Fenghuangchi to Difengjiang transfer for Line 5. The second section opened on December 10, 2025. It is 4 km in length with 4 stations from Fenghuangchi to Banzhou.

==== Line 5 ====
The first phase of Line 5 starts at Jingxi Houyu and end at Ancient Luozhou Town. It is 22.4 km long with 17 stations. Construction of this line started in September 2017. The line opened on 29 April 2022. And the second phase from Ancient Luozhou Town to Fuzhou South Railway Station which opened at August 27, 2023 together with Line 4.

==== Line 6 ====
The first phase of Line 6 starts at Pandun and end at Wanshou. It is 31.346 km long with 16 stations. Construction of this line started in November 2016. The line opened on 28 August 2022.

=== Future expansion ===
Planned opening date	Route	Terminals		Length (km)	Stations	Status	Notes
2026	2 East Extension	Yangli	Mawei Port	16.88	10	Under construction	
2026	6 East Extension	Wanshou	Shibakongzha	5.34	5	Under construction	
TBC	3	Zhanban	Wushan	32.4	23	Proposed	
TBC	4 Phase II	Difengjiang	Hongtang	13.3	8	Proposed	
TBC	6 West Extension	Hongtang	Pandun	14.4	10	Proposed	
TBC	8	Qingqi	Fuzhou South Railway Station	42.2	26	Proposed	
TBC	S1	Xiangqian	Fuqing Railway Station	35.8	9	Proposed	

==== Under construction ====
===== Line 4 =====
Line 4 is planned to be 28.4 km in length and will have 23 stations. This line will start at Banzhou and end at Difengjiang. The budget for constructing this line is 18.436 billion yuan and the planned construction period is 2017–2022. The construction of this line started in December 2017. The first part started operation in August 2023.

==== Planned ====
===== Line 3 =====
Line 3 is planned to be 27.2 km long with 22 stations. This line will start at Houban and end at Nanyu Town via Fuzhou Railway Station and Paiwei Road.

===== Line 7 =====
Line 7 is reserved for Binhai New Area. It is planned to start at Jinfeng Town, Changle County and end at Jiangtian Town.

===== Line 8 =====
Line 8 is planned to be 49.9 km in length with 19 stations, linking the University Town, Technology Town and Changle.

===== Line 9 =====
Line 9 will mainly serve Binhai New Area and Changle New Town. The length of this line is expected to be 24.4 km with 17 stations.

== Tickets and fares ==
=== Tickets ===
==== Single journey tickets ====
The single journey tickets of Fuzhou Metro are red plastic RFID tokens. The logo of Fuzhou Metro and the words "Metro Fuzhou" are shown in the center of the tokens. The English and Chinese words of "Fuzhou Urban Rail Transit" are shown on the edges of the tokens. The tickets can be purchased from the automatic ticketing machines. When entering the stations, passengers tap the token against a scanner. When exiting, the token is inserted into a slot for recycling.

==== Smart cards ====
The smart cards for public transportation named "Rongcheng Universal Card" can be used to ride Fuzhou Metro. Rongcheng Universal Cards can be purchased at all metro stations and several service centers in the city. The cards can also be used to pay for public buses.

In addition, China T-Union cards also can be used to ride Fuzhou Metro, but the cards are without discount on the ride.

==== QR Code ====
QR Code is available for Fuzhou Metro. Passenger can use QR code in two mobile applications named "e-Fuzhou" and "Mashangxing" to take metro. From 25 January 2021, Alipay and UnionPay are also available for Fuzhou Metro.

=== Fares ===
The fares are based on distances.

Fares (RMB/Trip)	2	3	4	5	6	+1
Total Distance (km)	0-5	5-10	10-15	15-22	22-29	>29
Span (km)	-	5	5	7	7	9

== Infrastructure ==
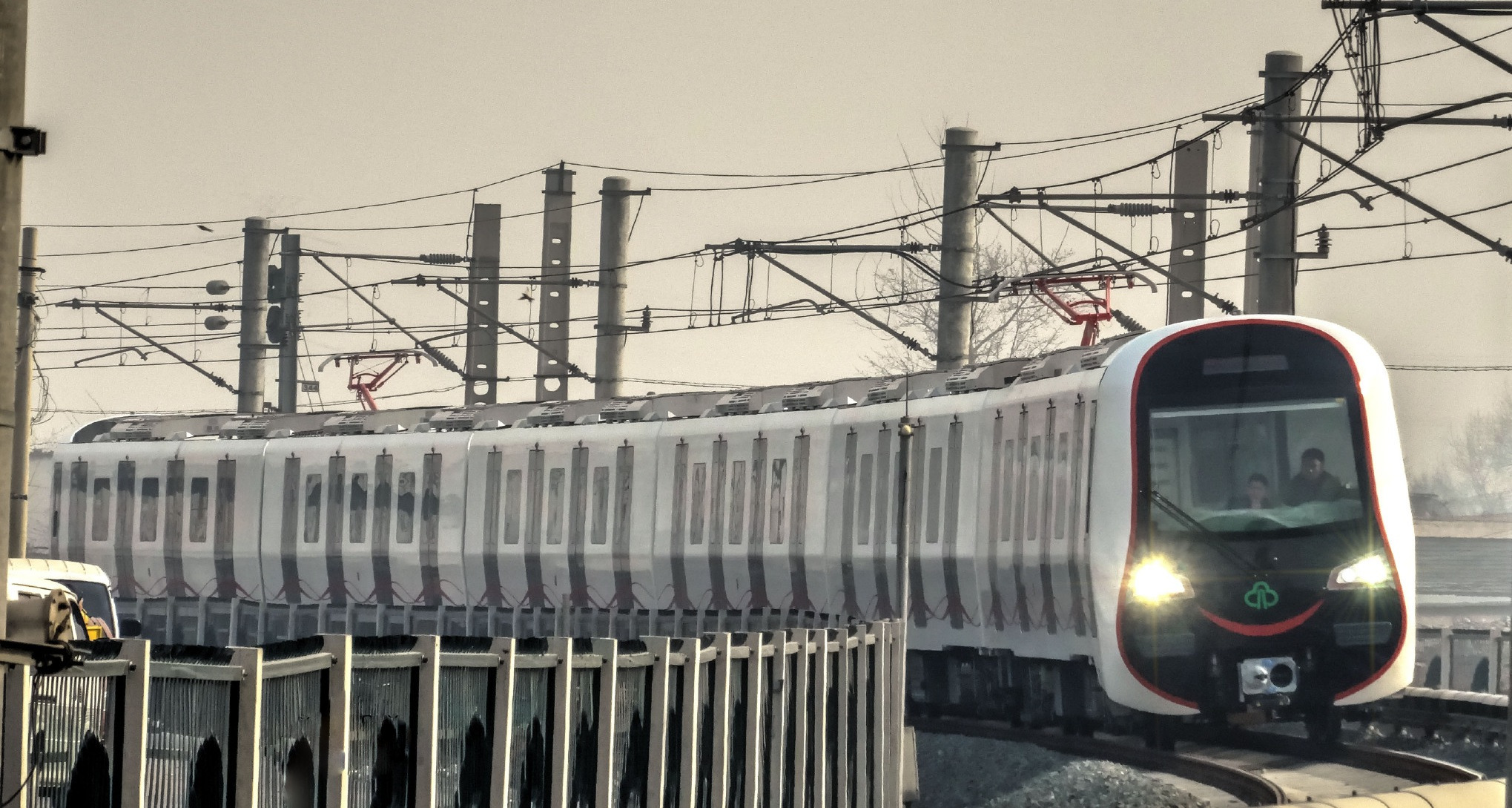
Train of Fuzhou Metro

=== Rolling stock ===
The Model-B trains are used for Line 1. This kind of train consists of 6 cars with 256 seats and has a capacity of around 1,500 passengers. There are 28 trains ordered for Line 1, the first few of which were produced by CNR Tangshan Railway Vehicle Co., Ltd. in April 2015.

Line	Train-set	Train-type	Max Speed	Numbers	Producer	Signal	Power	First Train Delivery Year
1	6-car	B	80km/h	28	CRRC Tangshan	CRSC & Siemens	DC 1500V	2015
2	6-car	B	80km/h	31	CRRC Tangshan	Nriet & Siemens	DC 1500V	2018
4	6-car	B	80km/h	32	CRRC Tangshan	Nriet & Siemens	DC 1500V	2022
5	6-car	B	80km/h	22	CRRC Tangshan	Nriet & Siemens	DC 1500V	2021
6	4-car	B	100km/h	17	CRRC Tangshan	Nriet & Siemens	DC 1500V	2020
Binhai Express	4-car	Intercity-A	140km/h	30	CRRC Tangshan	Nriet & Siemens	AC 25kV	Expected in 2025

=== Accessibility ===
==== Vertical elevators ====
All Fuzhou Metro stations are equipped with vertical elevators from the platform to the concourse, and from the concourse to the ground level.

==== Platform pedals ====
Pedals for wheelchairs are available at all platforms, and passengers in need can ask staff for assistance.

==== Blind lanes ====
Blind lanes are available from the entrances to the platforms at all stations.

==== Others ====
Accessible restrooms are available in all stations. The accessible restrooms are equipped with mirrors that tilt down for wheelchair users and multiple grab handles.

Nursing rooms are available in some high-traffic stations, which provide nursing bottle warming and disinfection machines, nursing tables, automatic hand-washing sinks, emergency call devices and other equipment.

== See also ==
- List of metro systems
- Urban rail transit in China
