= Changle railway station =

Changle railway station may refer to:

- Changle railway station (Fujian) (长乐站)
- Changle railway station (Shandong) (昌乐站)

== See also ==
- Changle East railway station, Fujian
- Changle South railway station, Fujian
