= Fuping =

Fuping may refer to:

Chinese counties

- Fuping County, Hebei (阜平县)
- Fuping County, Shaanxi (富平县)

Chinese towns or subdistricts

- Fuping, Changde (府坪街道), a subdistrict in Wuling District, Changde City, Hunan Province
- Fuping Town (阜平镇), a town which is the county seat of Fuping County, Hebei Province

a military service system in ancient China

- Fu-Ping, Fubing system (府兵制), local militia system that existed in China between 6th and 8th century

Railway line

- Fuping Railway (Fuzhou-Pingtan Railway); see Pingtan Island
