= Yuanmen =

Yuanmen may refer to:

- Yuanmen Committee, Tancheng, Pingtan County.
- Yuanmen language, one of the Hlai languages.
- Yuanmen Township (元门乡), Hainan.
