= Tancheng =

Tancheng may refer to the following places in China:

- Tancheng County (郯城县), Shandong
- Tancheng, Anhui (坛城镇), town in Mengcheng County
- Tancheng Subdistrict (潭城街道), Jianyang, Fujian
- Tancheng, Pingtan County (潭城镇), Fuzhou, Fujian
- Tancheng, Shandong (郯城镇), town in and seat of Tancheng County
