= Haixia =

Haixia may refer to:

- Sea strait in Mandarin Chinese (海峡).
- Hainan Strait Shipping, the major ferry and roro service operator in Hainan.
- Fujian Cross Strait Ferry, ferries linking Taiwan to mainland China
- Fujian Haixia Bank, a bank in Fuzhou, China
- Zheng Haixia Chinese basketball player
- Zhang Haixia Chinese handball player
