= Changle railway station (Fujian) =

Railway station in Fujian, China

Changle 长乐

General information
- Location: Changle District, Fuzhou, Fujian; China
- Coordinates: 25°55′28″N 119°29′06″E
- Operated by: China Railway High-speed
- Line: Fuzhou–Pingtan railway
- Platforms: 2

History
- Opened: December 26, 2020
Location

Changle railway station is a railway station in Changle District, Fuzhou, Fujian, China. It opened with the Fuzhou–Pingtan railway on 26 December 2020.

Preceding station	China Railway High-speed	Following station
Fuzhou South towards Fuzhou	Fuzhou–Pingtan railway	Changle East towards Pingtan
