= Fuzhou–Pingtan railway =

Railway line between Fuzhou and Pingtan

Overview
- Status: Operating
- Termini: Fuzhou; Pingtan
- Stations: 6

Service
- Type: Heavy rail

History
- Opened: 26 December 2020

Technical
- Line length: 83.43 km (52 mi)
- Track gauge: 1,435 mm (4 ft 8 1/2 in) standard gauge
- Electrification: Yes
- Operating speed: 160 km/h (99 mph) (Fuzhou to Fuzhou South); 200 km/h (124 mph) (Fuzhou South to Pingtan)

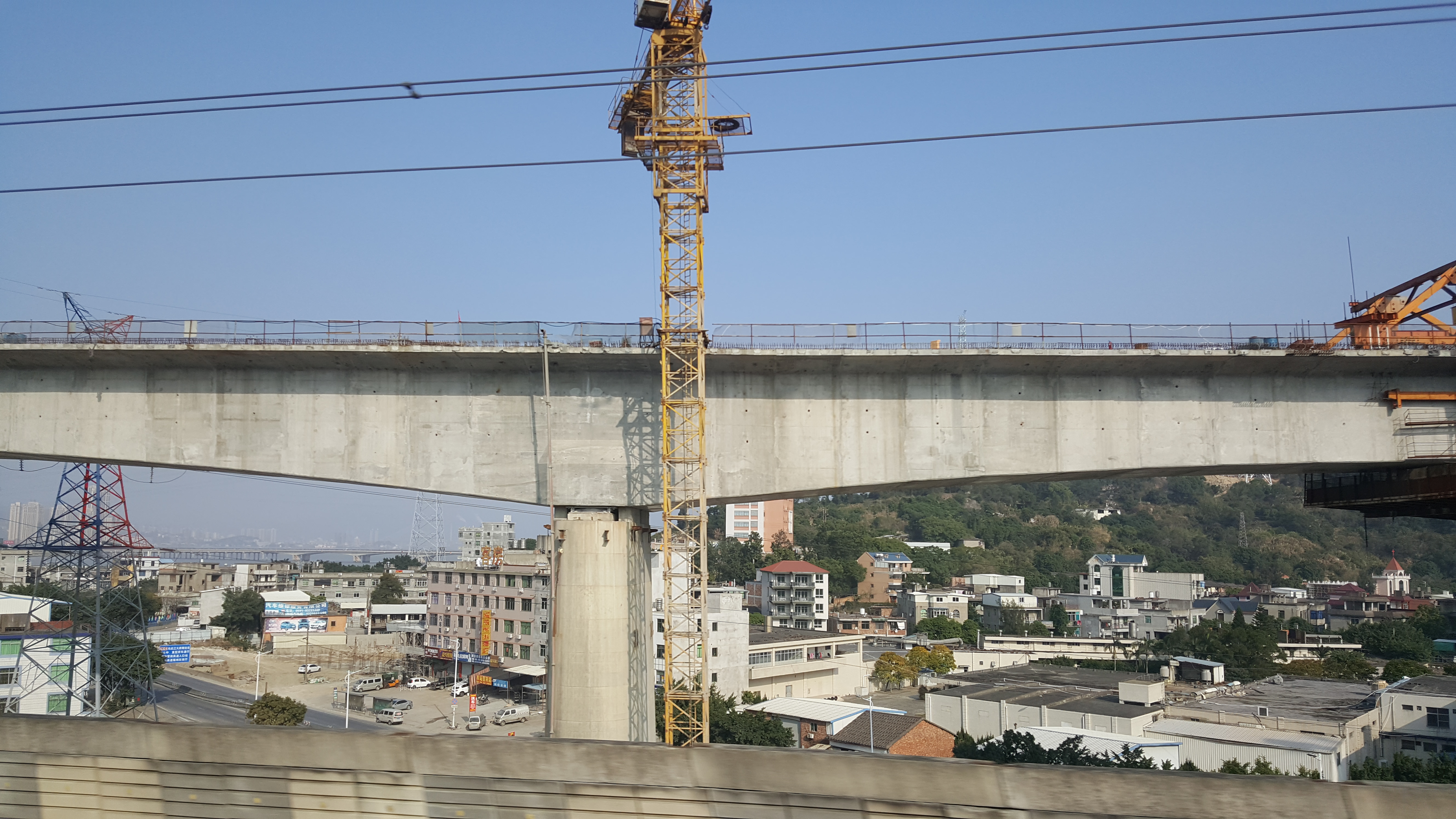
Fuzhou-Pingtan railway under construction

The Fuzhou–Pingtan railway is a railway line in Fujian Province, China. It opened on 26 December 2020.

The railway is the first to serve Pingtan Island, which it accesses via the Pingtan Strait Road-Rail Bridge. It is part of Beijing–Taipei high-speed rail corridor.

== History ==
Construction began on 31 October 2013.

== Stations ==
The line has the following stations:

- Fuzhou
- Fuzhou South
- Changle
- Changle East
- Changle South
- Pingtan
