= Pingtan County =

County in Fuzhou, Fujian, China

Pingtan 平潭縣/平潭县 P'ing-t'an
- County
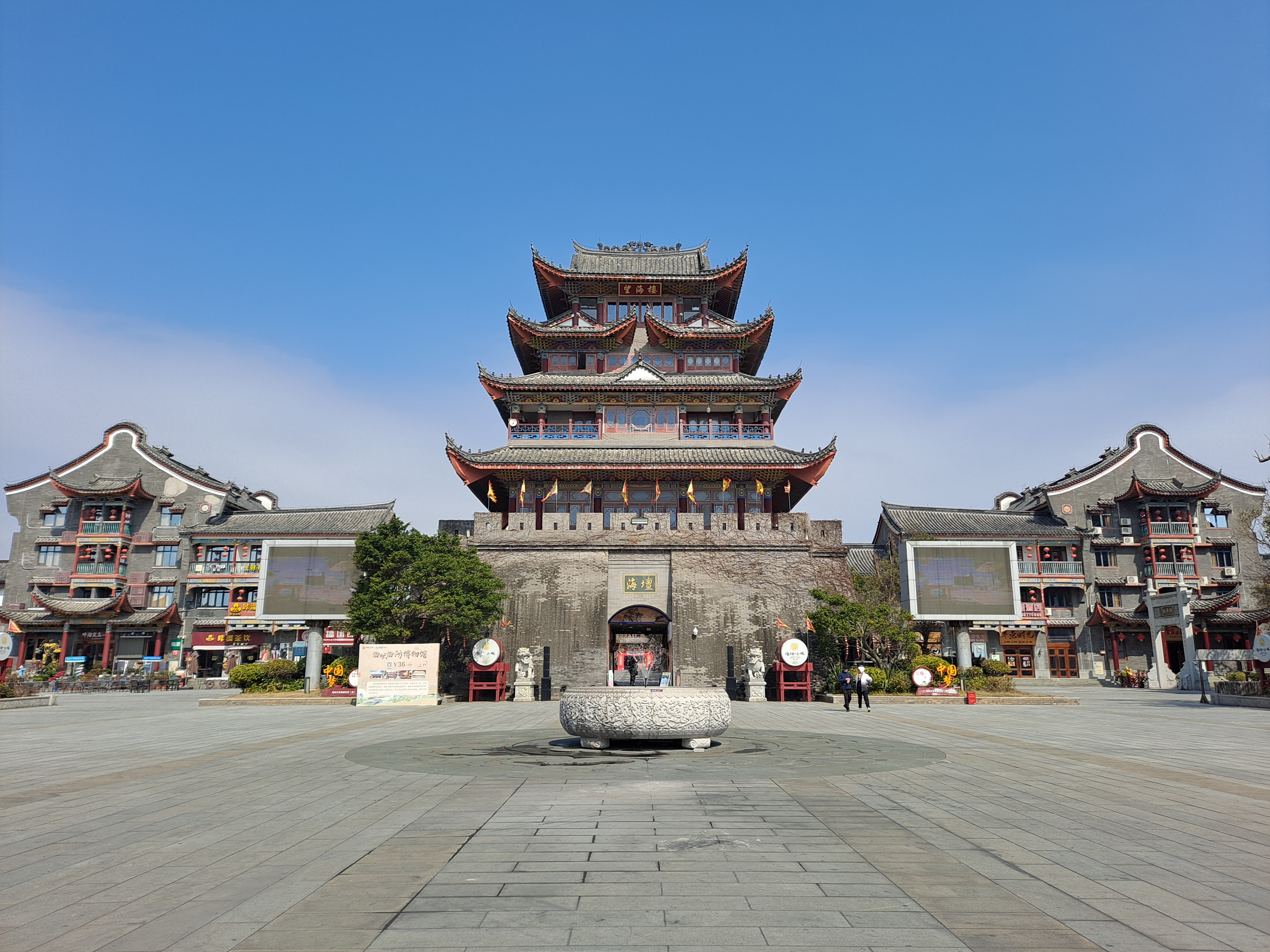
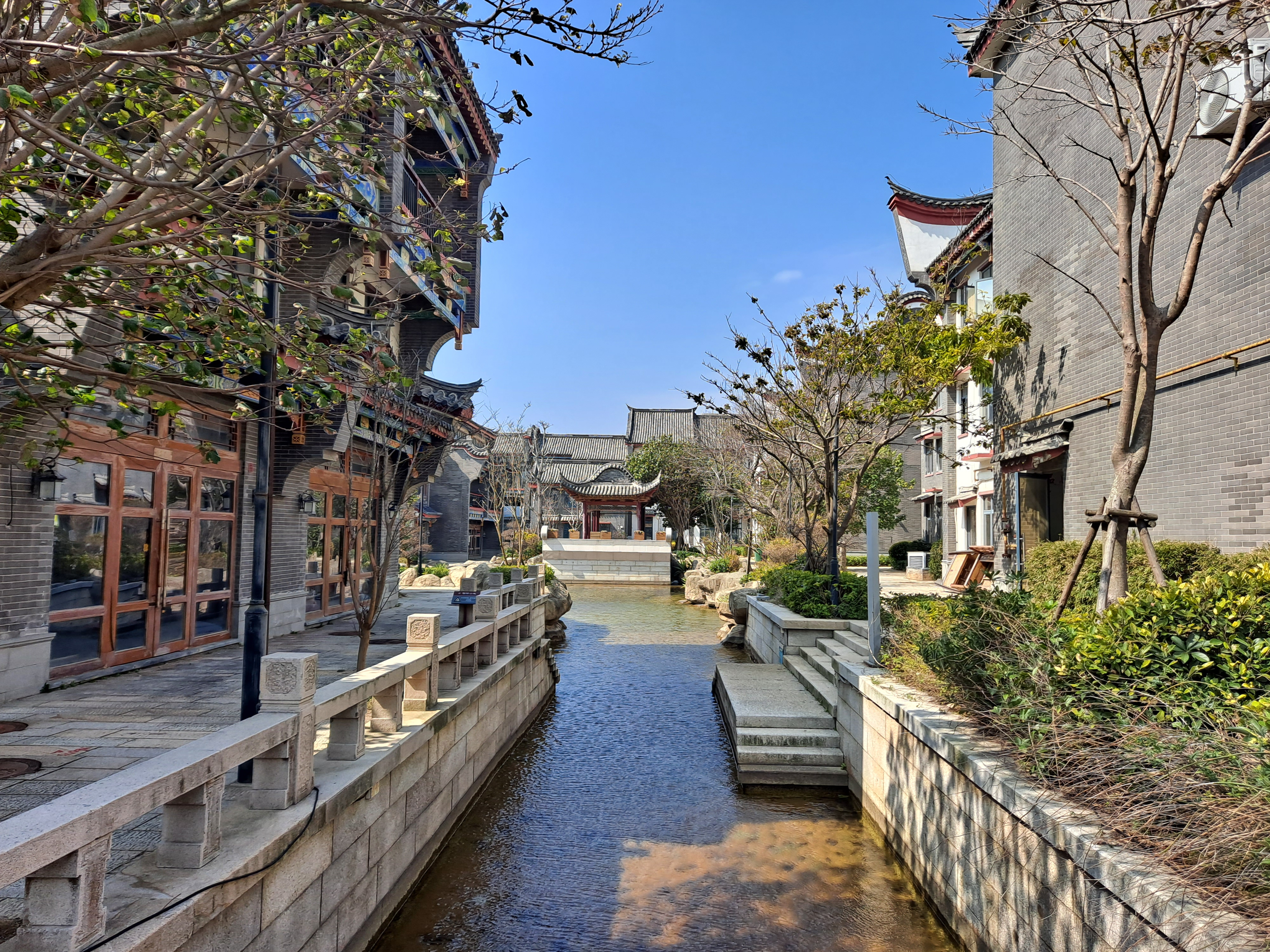
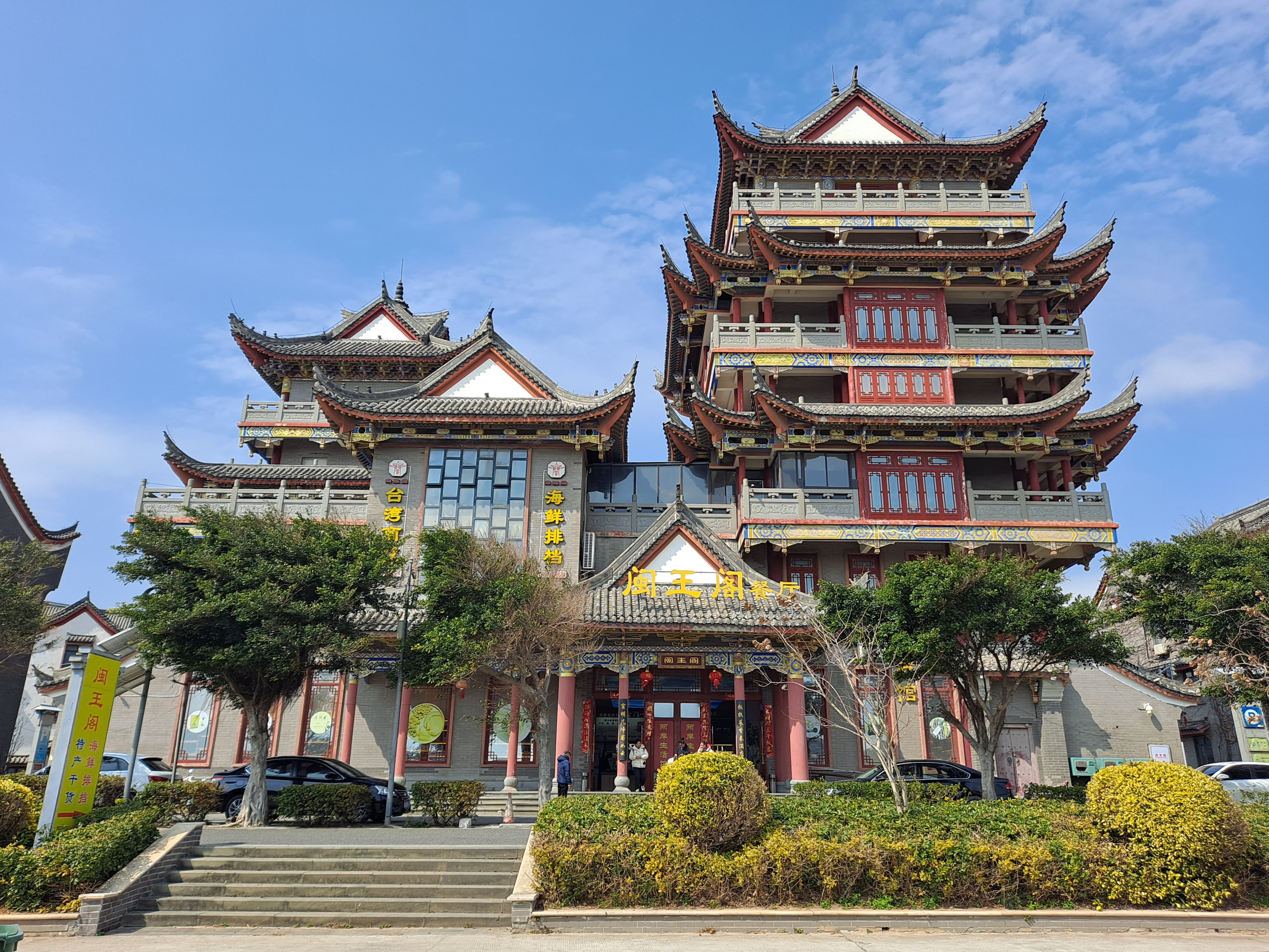
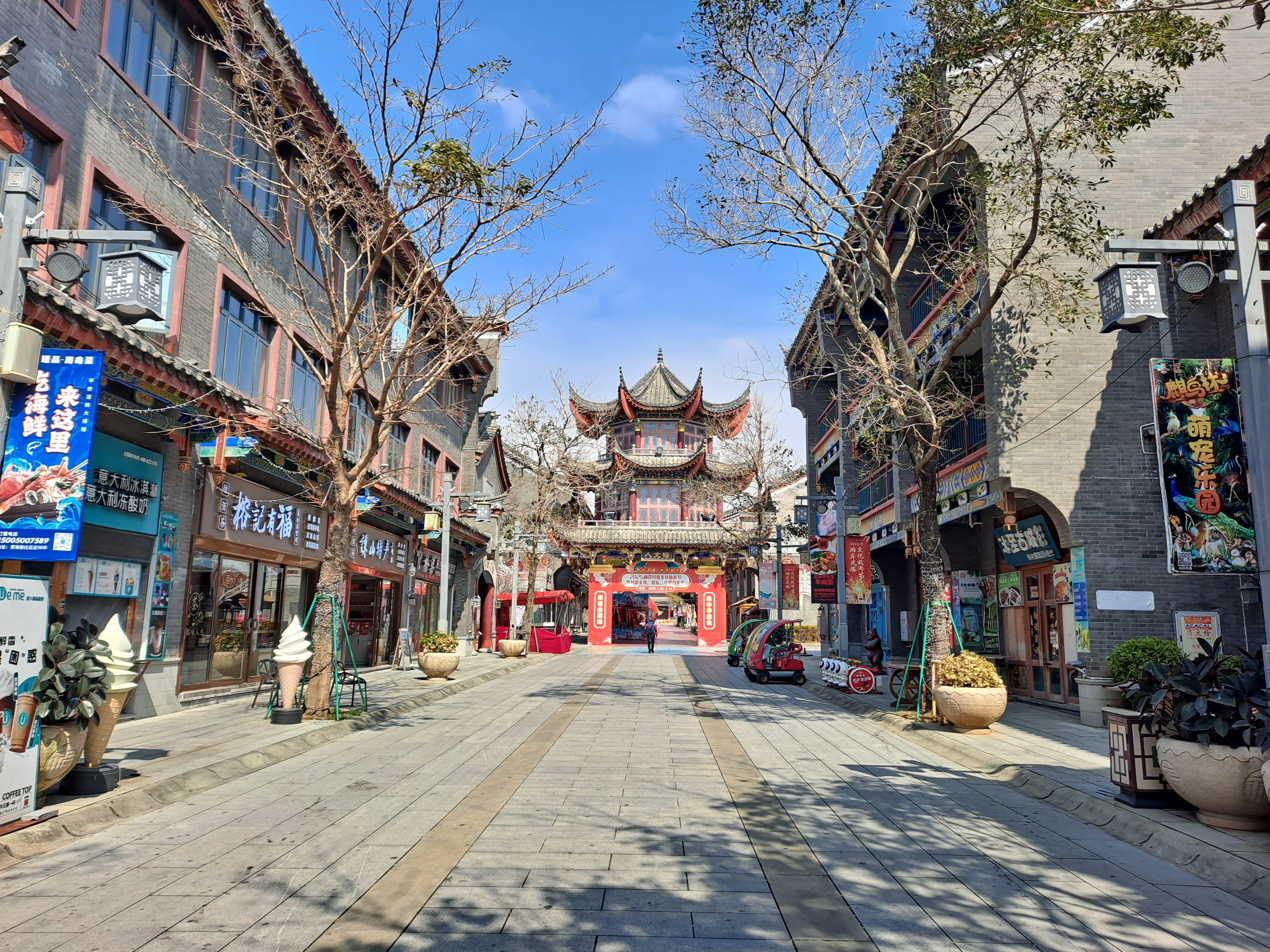
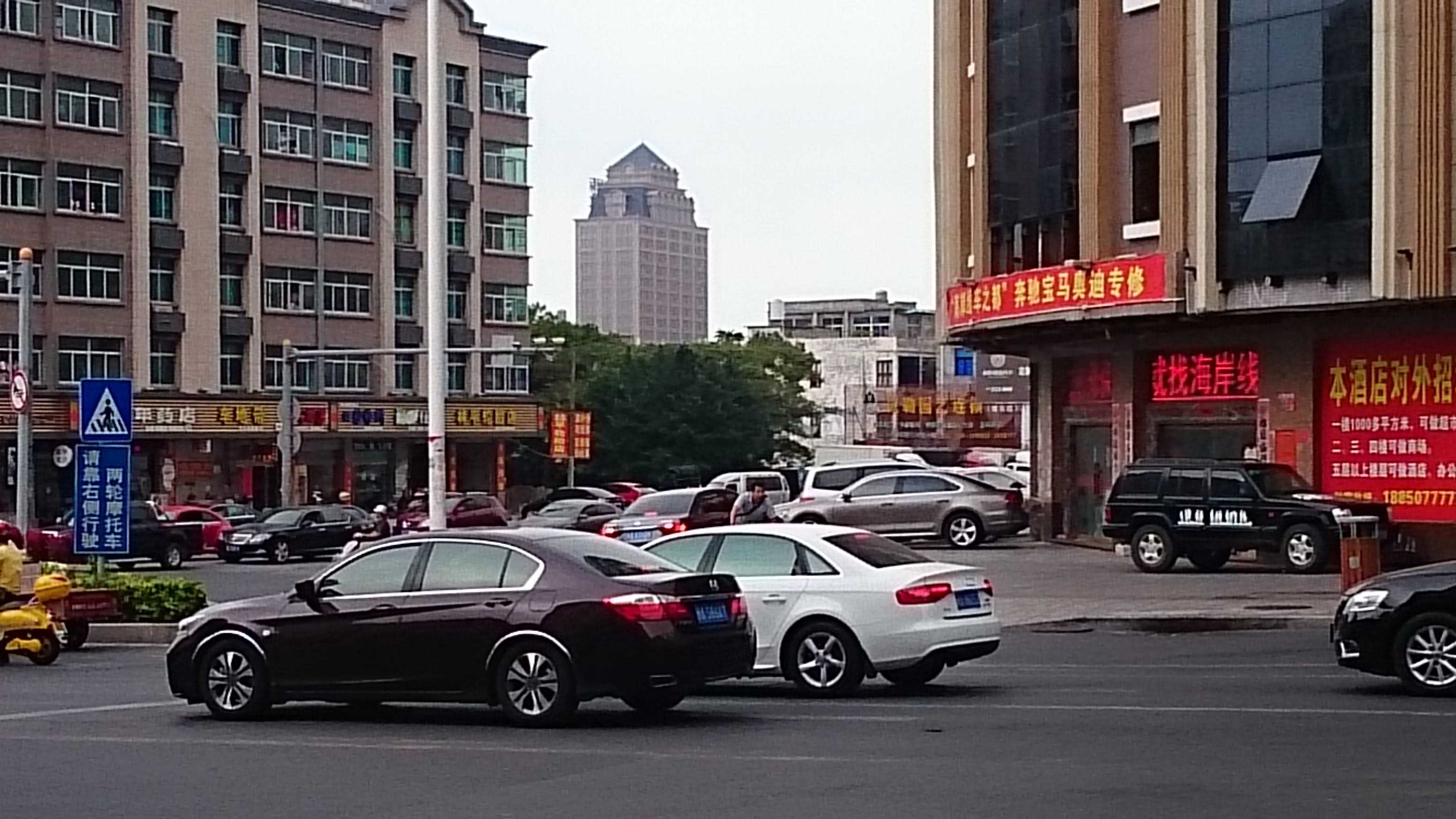

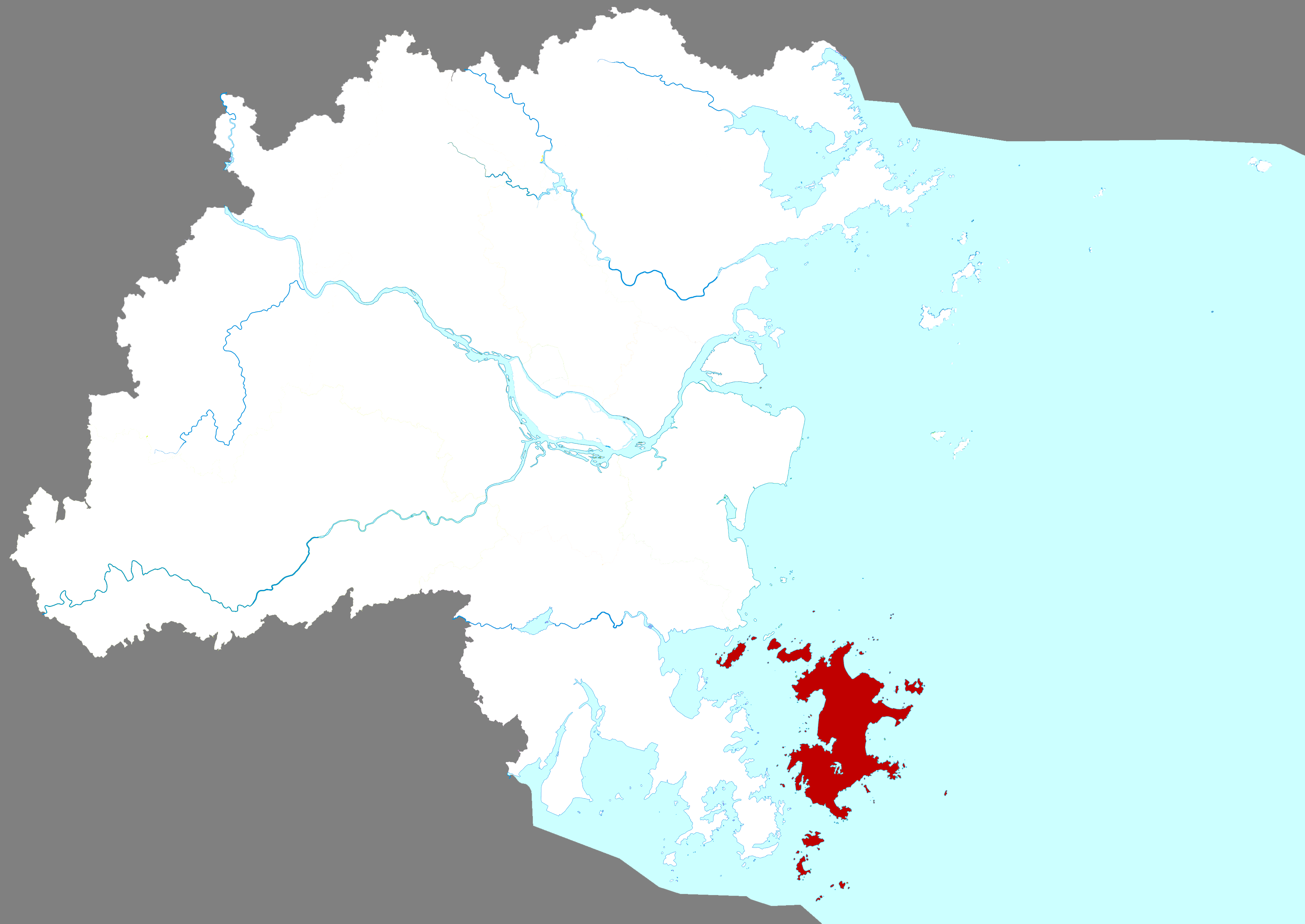
- Location of Pingtan in Fuzhou

- Location of the seat in Fujian
- Coordinates (Pingtan government): 25°29′55″N 119°47′25″E
- Country: People's Republic of China
- Province: Fujian
- Prefecture-level city: Fuzhou
- Seat: Tancheng

Area
  - County: 6,435 km^{2} (2,485 sq mi)
  - Land: 371.91 km^{2} (143.60 sq mi)
  - Water: 6,064 km^{2} (2,341 sq mi) 94.2%
- Elevation: 44 m (144 ft)

Population (2020)
  - County: 385,981
  - Density: 1,037.8/km^{2} (2,688.0/sq mi)
  - Urban: 207,444 (53.7%)
- Time zone: UTC+8 (China Standard)
- Postal code: 350400
- Area code: 0591
- Website: english.pingtan.gov.cn

Pingtan County
- Traditional Chinese: 平潭縣
- Simplified Chinese: 平潭县
Transcriptions
Standard Mandarin
- Hanyu Pinyin: Píngtán Xiàn
Eastern Min
- Fuzhou BUC: Bìng-tàng-gâing

Pingtan County (Chinese: 平潭县) is a county and archipelago comprising 126 islands in the Taiwan Strait, it is under the administration of the prefecture-level city of Fuzhou, the capital of Fujian Province, China. Now it is also the subject of Pingtan Comprehensive Pilot Zone (平潭综合实验区). The main island is Haitan Island (海坛岛; Hāi-tàng Dō).

== History ==
During the Qing Dynasty, Pingtan Ting (平潭廳) was created. In 1913, Pingtan County was established.

In 2009, Pingtan Country was made a pilot zone for cross-strait integration between Taiwan and mainland China. This included preferential policies in regard to customs, taxes, investment and land use. Between 27 and 28 September 2016, Typhoon Megi brought torrential rains across Pingtan. Bus lines resumed normal operations on September 29.

== Geography ==
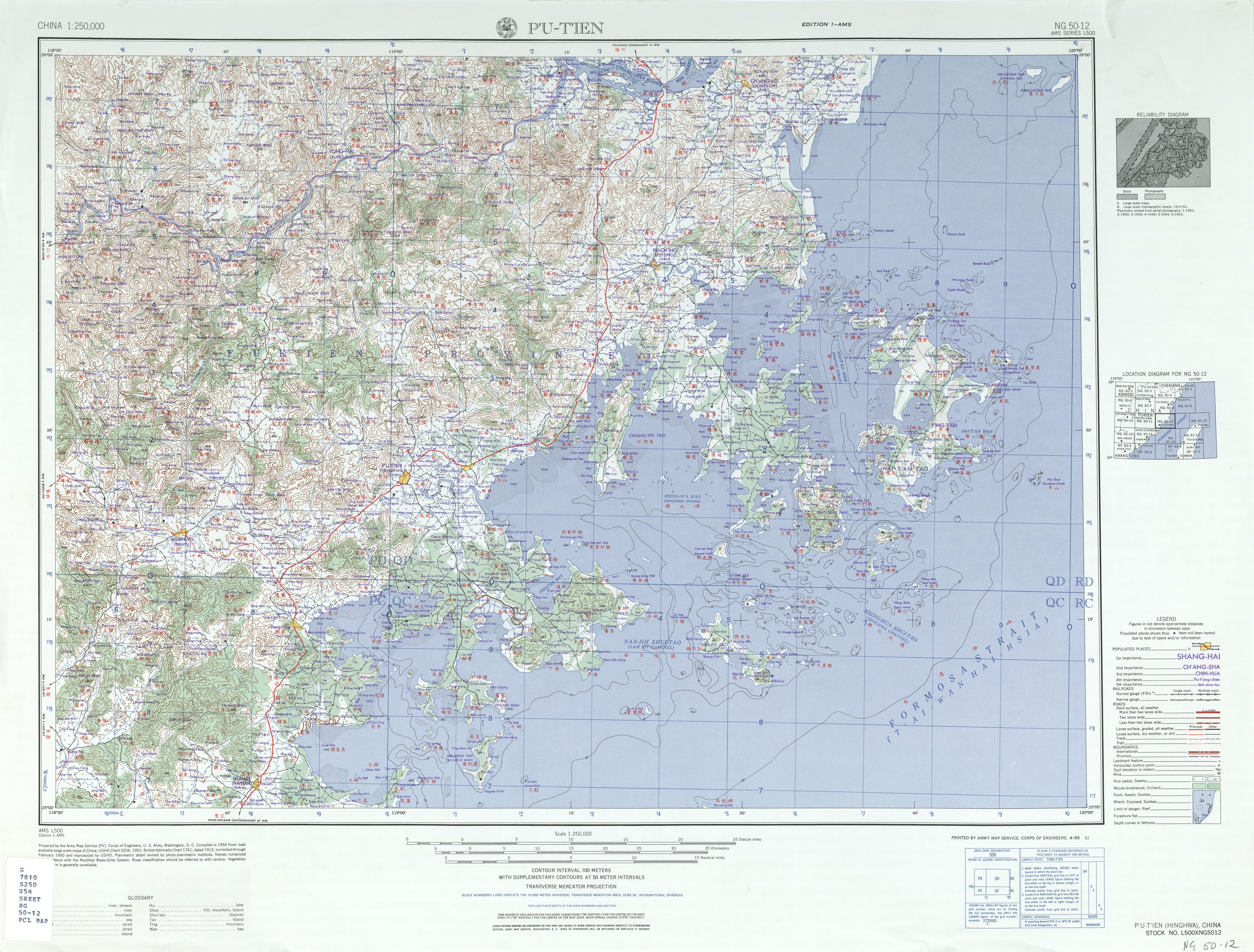
Map including Pingtan (labeled as P'ING-T'AN 平潭) (AMS, 1954)

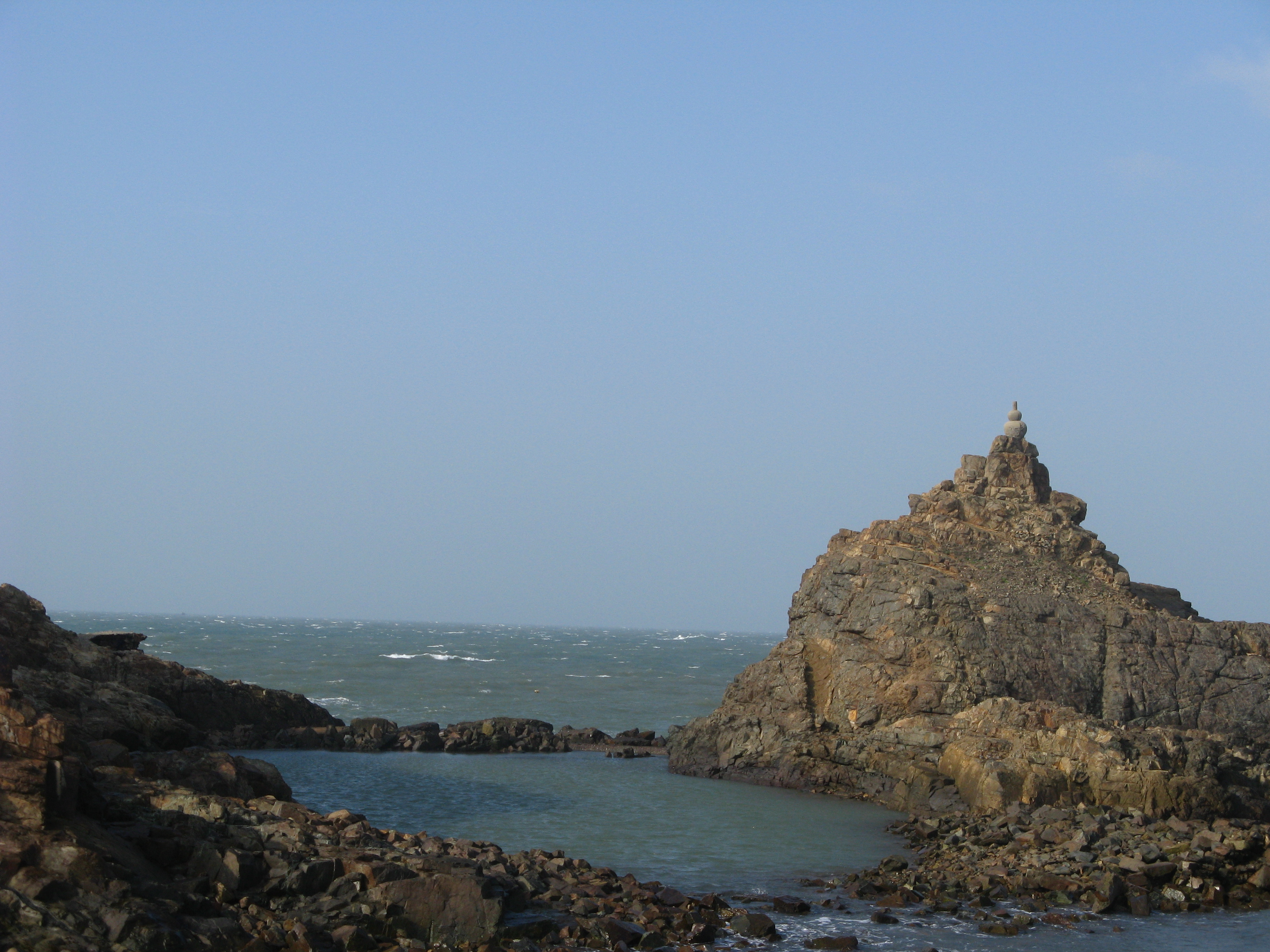
Hulu'ao (葫芦澳), at Pingtan's seaside

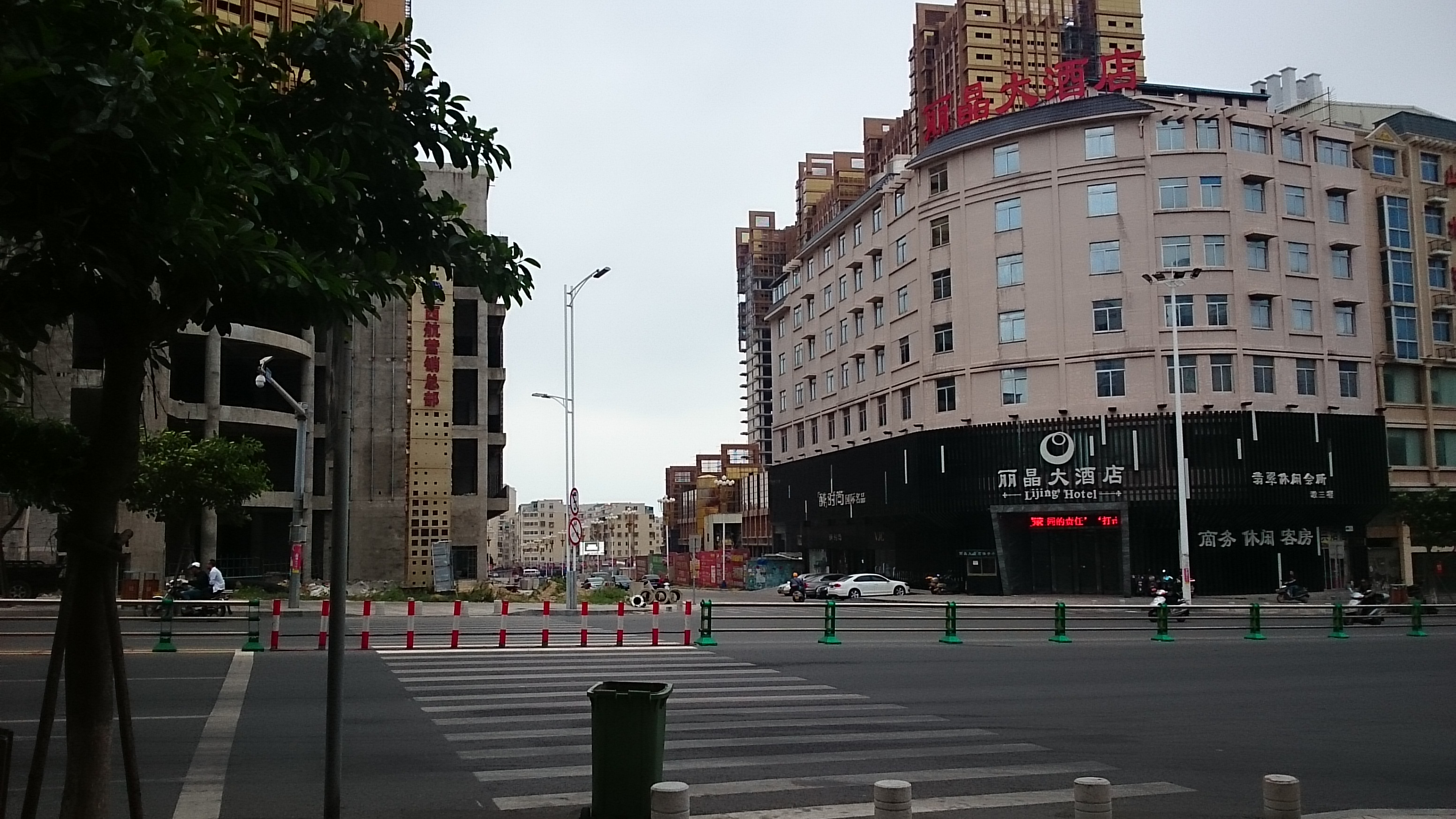
Lige hotel

Pingtan County has a total land area of 371 square kilometres (143 sq mi), comprising 126 islands, and covers 6,064 square kilometres (2,341 sq mi) of sea. The main island, Haitan Island, covers an area of 267 square kilometres (103 sq mi), or 72% of the county's land area, and is the largest island in all of Fujian. Niushan Island is located in the eastern part of the county. To the east is the Taiwan Strait. The area is the closest place in mainland China (PRC) to the main island of Taiwan.

=== Climate ===
By virtue of its maritime location, Pingtan has a moderated climate, with high humidity and minimal diurnal temperature variation. Under the Köppen climate classification, it has a humid subtropical climate (Cfa), with mild winters and hot, humid summers, though much cooler than inland places. The monthly daily average temperature ranges from 11.5 °C (52.7 °F) in February to 28.1 °C (82.6 °F) in July. The bulk of the rainfall annually occurs in spring and early summer, while autumn and early winter is the driest time of the year. The area experiences windy weather, with an average wind speed of 17.3 kilometres per hour (10.7 mph), and wind directions are consistent. Freezing temperatures have never been recorded here. Record extremes in Pingtan have ranged from 0.9 °C (33.6 °F) on 31 January 1977 to 37.4 °C (99.3 °F) in August 1966.

Climate data for Pingtan, elevation 32 m (105 ft), (1991–2020 normals, extremes 1954–present)
Month	Jan	Feb	Mar	Apr	May	Jun	Jul	Aug	Sep	Oct	Nov	Dec	Year
Record high °C (°F)	26.4 (79.5)	27.9 (82.2)	28.6 (83.5)	30.3 (86.5)	31.7 (89.1)	34.4 (93.9)	35.9 (96.6)	37.4 (99.3)	36.3 (97.3)	32.7 (90.9)	29.3 (84.7)	26.7 (80.1)	37.4 (99.3)
Mean daily maximum °C (°F)	13.9 (57.0)	14.3 (57.7)	16.8 (62.2)	21.2 (70.2)	25.1 (77.2)	28.6 (83.5)	31.1 (88.0)	31.0 (87.8)	29.0 (84.2)	24.8 (76.6)	20.9 (69.6)	16.4 (61.5)	22.8 (73.0)
Daily mean °C (°F)	11.9 (53.4)	11.8 (53.2)	13.8 (56.8)	18.1 (64.6)	22.4 (72.3)	26.1 (79.0)	28.4 (83.1)	28.4 (83.1)	26.8 (80.2)	23.1 (73.6)	19.1 (66.4)	14.3 (57.7)	20.4 (68.6)
Mean daily minimum °C (°F)	10.1 (50.2)	9.8 (49.6)	11.6 (52.9)	15.8 (60.4)	20.5 (68.9)	24.3 (75.7)	26.5 (79.7)	26.5 (79.7)	25.1 (77.2)	21.7 (71.1)	17.6 (63.7)	12.8 (55.0)	18.5 (65.3)
Record low °C (°F)	0.9 (33.6)	2.2 (36.0)	3.2 (37.8)	5.4 (41.7)	11.2 (52.2)	16.1 (61.0)	20.5 (68.9)	21.7 (71.1)	16.8 (62.2)	13.5 (56.3)	8.5 (47.3)	3.0 (37.4)	0.9 (33.6)
Average precipitation mm (inches)	60.3 (2.37)	71.3 (2.81)	105.5 (4.15)	110.0 (4.33)	162.5 (6.40)	238.3 (9.38)	126.5 (4.98)	144.6 (5.69)	120.9 (4.76)	41.6 (1.64)	52.1 (2.05)	54.2 (2.13)	1,287.8 (50.69)
Average precipitation days (≥ 0.1 mm)	10.1	11.1	14.7	13.4	13.7	12.6	6.2	8.3	9.4	6.7	7.8	8.9	122.9
Average snowy days	0.1	0	0	0	0	0	0	0	0	0	0	0	0.1
Average relative humidity (%)	77	79	81	82	85	86	82	82	78	75	77	75	80
Mean monthly sunshine hours	86.9	83.3	99.6	112.6	119.0	148.7	247.8	225.4	180.7	144.4	88.7	90.5	1,627.6
Percentage possible sunshine	26	26	27	29	29	36	59	56	49	41	27	28	36
Source: China Meteorological Administration Jul, Aug and Sep Record highs

== Administrative divisions ==
The county executive, legislature and judiciary is in Tancheng Town, colloquially called Pingtan, together with the CPC and PSB branches. The county administers seven towns and eight townships, accounting for 200 neighbourhood and village committees.

=== Towns ===
- Tancheng (潭城镇) Tàng-siàng Déng
- Su'ao (Su-ao; 苏澳镇) Sŭ-ó̤ Déng 25.616017°N 119.706692°E
- Liushui (Liu-shui; 流水镇) Làu-cuōi Déng
- Aoqian (澳前镇) Ó̤-sèng Déng 25.478664°N 119.826739°E
- Beicuo (北厝镇) Báe̤k-chió Déng
- Pingyuan (平原镇) Bìng-nguòng Déng
- Aodong (敖东镇) Ngò̤-dĕ̤ng Déng

=== Townships ===
- Baiqing (白青乡) Băh-chăng Hiŏng
- Yutou (屿头乡) Sê̤ṳ-tàu Hiŏng
- Dalian (大练乡) Duâi-liêng Hiŏng
- Luyang (芦洋乡) Lù-iòng Hiŏng
- Zhonglou (中楼乡) Dṳ̆ng-làu Hiŏng
- Dongxiang (东庠乡) Dĕ̤ng-siòng Hiŏng 25.594566°N 119.881818°E
- Lancheng (岚城乡) Làng-siàng Hiŏng 25.510698°N 119.777524°E
- Nanhai (南海乡) Nàng-hāi Hiŏng

== Economy ==
Agricultural products include sweet potatoes and peanuts among others. To the east of the county is the Niushan fishery which produces yellow fish (Chinese: 黄鱼) and cutlassfish in abundance among others. Tangyu zicai (Chinese: 塘屿紫菜) is a local speciality. Mineral resources include coal, iron, and quartz. Industries include mining, salt making, fishery processing, seafood processing, machinery, and shipbuilding. Handicrafts include scrimshaw.
