= Pingtan railway station =

Railway station in Fujian, China

Pingtan 平潭站
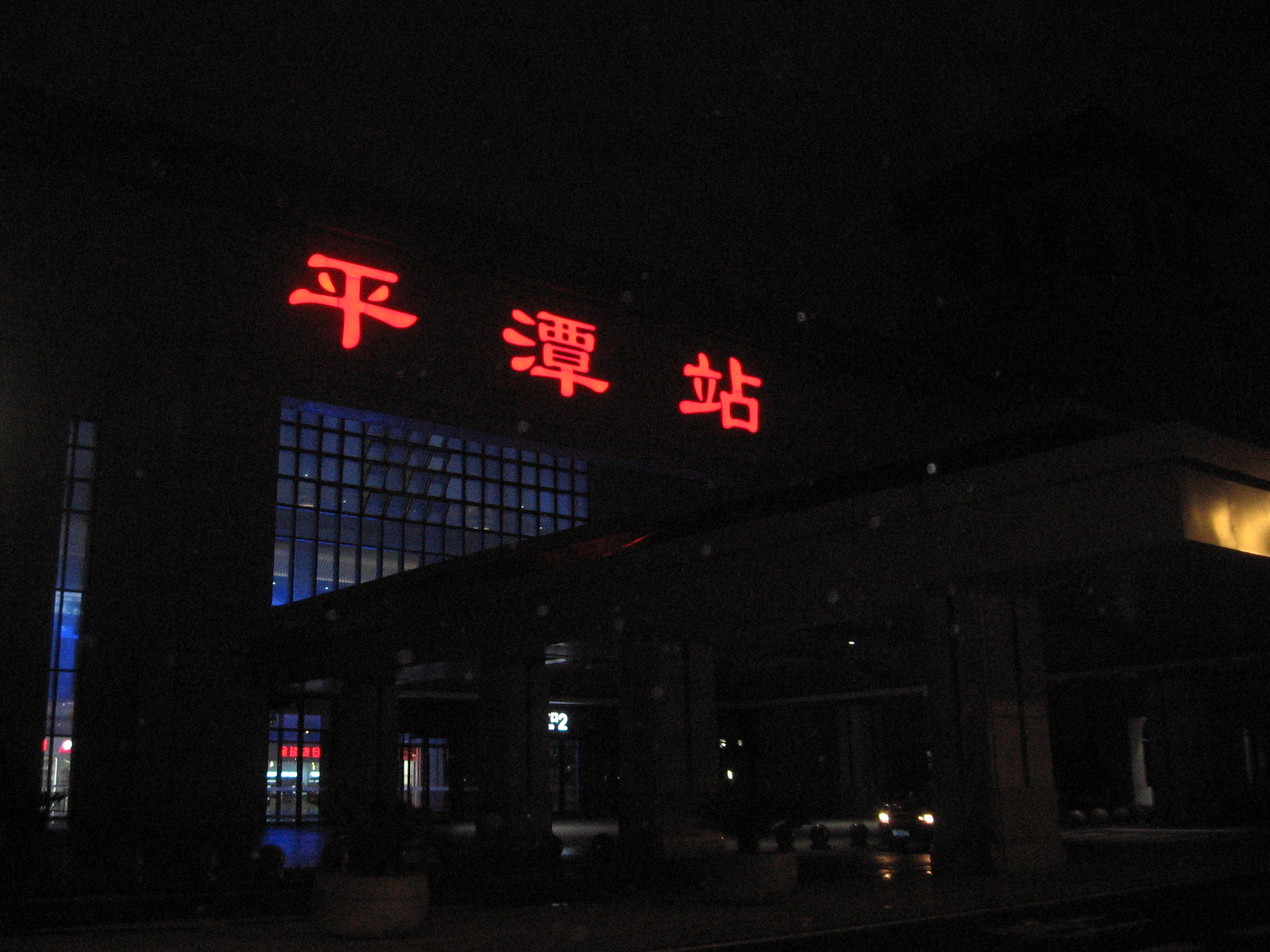

General information
- Location: Pingtan County, Fuzhou, Fujian; China
- Coordinates: 25°32′57″N 119°46′43″E
- Operated by: China Railway High-speed
- Line: Fuzhou–Pingtan railway

History
- Opened: 26 December 2020

Services
Preceding station	China Railway High-speed	Following station
Changle South towards Fuzhou	Fuzhou–Pingtan railway	Terminus
Location

Pingtan railway station is a railway station in Pingtan County, Fuzhou, Fujian, China. Located on Pingtan Island, it is the terminus of the Fuzhou–Pingtan railway. It opened with the line on 26 December 2020.
