= Changle South railway station =

Railway station in Fujian, China

Changle South 长乐南

General information
- Location: Changle District, Fuzhou, Fujian; China
- Coordinates: 25°45′26.05″N 119°35′26.6″E
- Operated by: China Railway High-speed
- Line: Fuzhou–Pingtan railway

History
- Opened: December 26, 2020
Location

Changle South railway station is a railway station in Changle District, Fuzhou, Fujian, China. It opened with the Fuzhou–Pingtan railway on 26 December 2020. This station was to be called Songxia (松下), but its name was changed prior to opening.

Preceding station	China Railway High-speed	Following station
Changle East towards Fuzhou	Fuzhou–Pingtan railway	Pingtan Terminus
