= Haixia (ferry) =

Ferry linking Fujian, China to Taiwan

Haixia (Chinese: 海峡) is a Ro Ro ocean ferry linking Pingtan Island in Fujian, China to cities in Taiwan.

The first ship, Hai Xia Hao (海峡号) made its maiden voyage in November 2011, sailing out of Aoqian Wharf in Pingtan to Taichung. In 2013, the Taiwanese ship Li Na Hao (麗娜號) entered service and a new route to Taipei was opened in 2013. In 2019, Haixia opened a passenger-cargo service linking Pingtan and Kaohsiung.

The ferry services were suspended in February 2020 as part of COVID-19 pandemic control measures. It was the only ferry link between Taiwan proper and mainland China, as other cross-strait ferries are between Matsu Islands and Fuzhou and Kinmen to Xiamen. The trip took 3 hours each way.
