= Pingtan Island =

Island in Fujian, China

Native name: 平潭岛
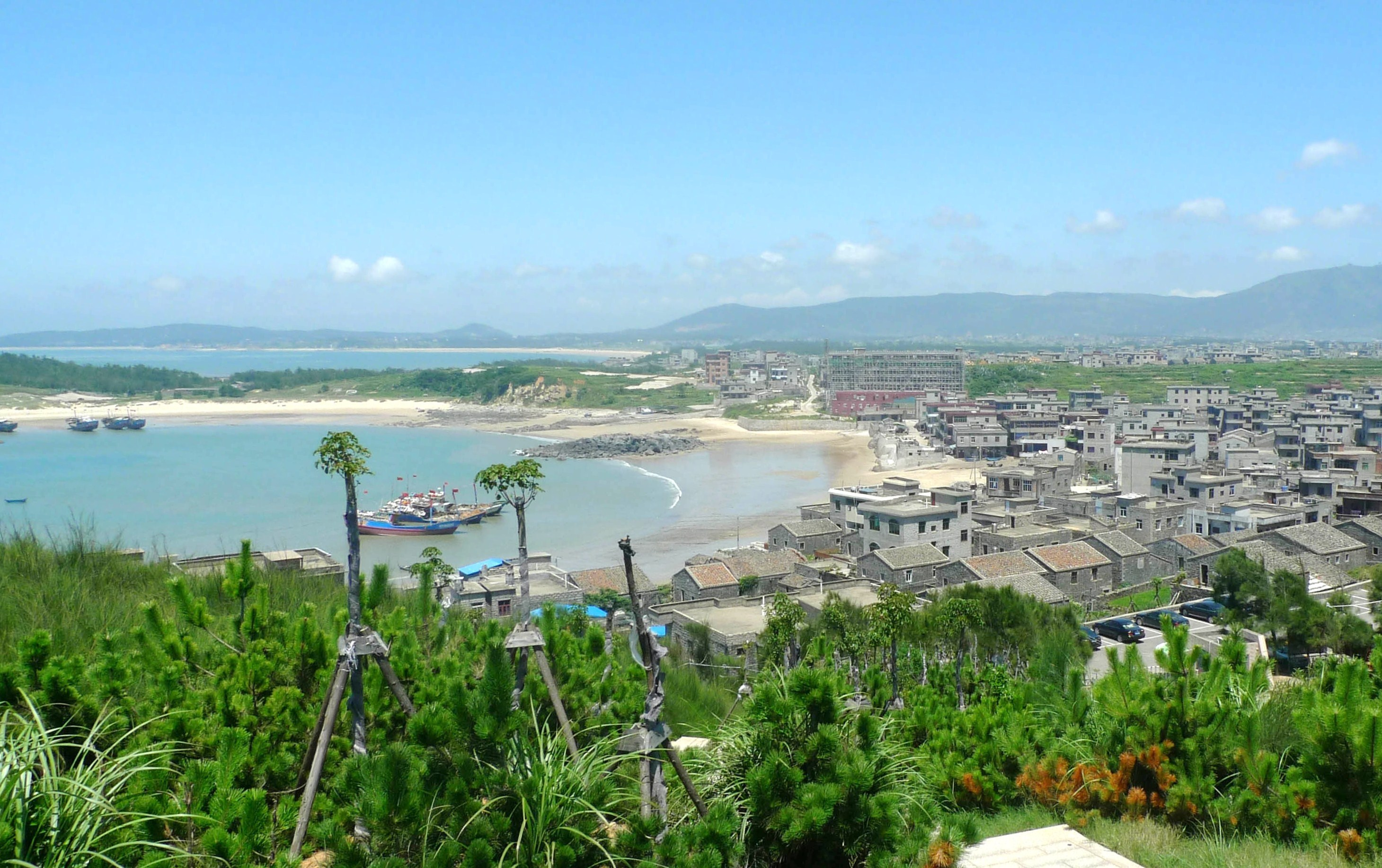
- Pingtan Beach

- Location within Fujian Location within China

Geography
- Location: Taiwan Strait
- Coordinates: 25°32′48″N 119°46′36″E

Administration
- China
- Province: Fujian Province

Other names

Haitan Island
- Traditional Chinese: 海壇島
- Simplified Chinese: 海坛岛
Transcriptions
Standard Mandarin
- Hanyu Pinyin: Hǎitán Dǎo
- Wade–Giles: Hai-t‘an Tao
Southern Min
- Hokkien POJ: Hái-tân-tó

Pingtan Island or Haitan Island is an island of Fuzhou off the east coast of mainland Asia in Pingtan County, Fujian Province, China, south of the complex estuary of the Min River. It is the largest island in Fujian and the fifth-largest island administered by the People's Republic of China.

== History ==
In June 1955, there were considerable road and military constructions across the Haitan Island, including roads leading to possible artillery positions on the mainland. These positions might have been used to protect the Haitan Strait, which was thought of as a favorable staging area for further amphibious operations against the Matsu Islands, and even Taiwan.

The site was added to the UNESCO World Heritage Tentative List in 2001, under Haitan Scenic Spots, in the Mixed category (Cultural & Natural).

== Geography ==
Administratively, the island is part of Pingtan County, which also includes several smaller islands and part of the nearby mainland. Most of the county's towns, including its seat of government at Tancheng, are on the island. Large areas of the island's coast have undergone land reclamation, along with major building and infrastructure projects.

Pingtan is separated from mainland China by the Haitan Strait. Most of the nearby mainland is the county-level city of Fuqing, administered as part of the prefecture-level city of Fuzhou. Pingtan is separated from island of Taiwan by the Taiwan Strait. Following the completion of its bridge to the mainland in 2010, Pingtan may be considered as the closest part of mainland China to the island of Taiwan.

Under current international agreement, the island's southernmost extremity forms the boundary between the East and South China Seas. In the still-unapproved draft of the new edition of the IHO's Limits of Oceans and Seas, Cape Xiang—the northernmost extremity of the island—forms the boundary between the East China Sea and the Taiwan Strait, with the South China Sea having its northern boundary moved to the south end of the strait.

On clear days, Xueshan (Snow Mountain) on the island of Taiwan can be seen from Pingtan Beach. This is one of the few locations from which Taiwan is visible to the naked eye from mainland China.

=== Climate ===
Under the Köppen climate classification, Pingtan has a humid subtropical climate (Cfa) climate, characterized by hot, humid summers and mild winters. Over the course of the year, the average temperature is about 66.92 °F. The hottest day of the year is between July and August, with an average 82.4 °F. The coldest day of the year is between January and February, with an average 51.8 °F. Pingtan has never experienced an extreme temperature under 32 °F. Because Pingtan is located between Haitan Strait and Taiwan Strait, the windspeed is high with annual average 4.8 m/s (10 mph).

=== Environment ===
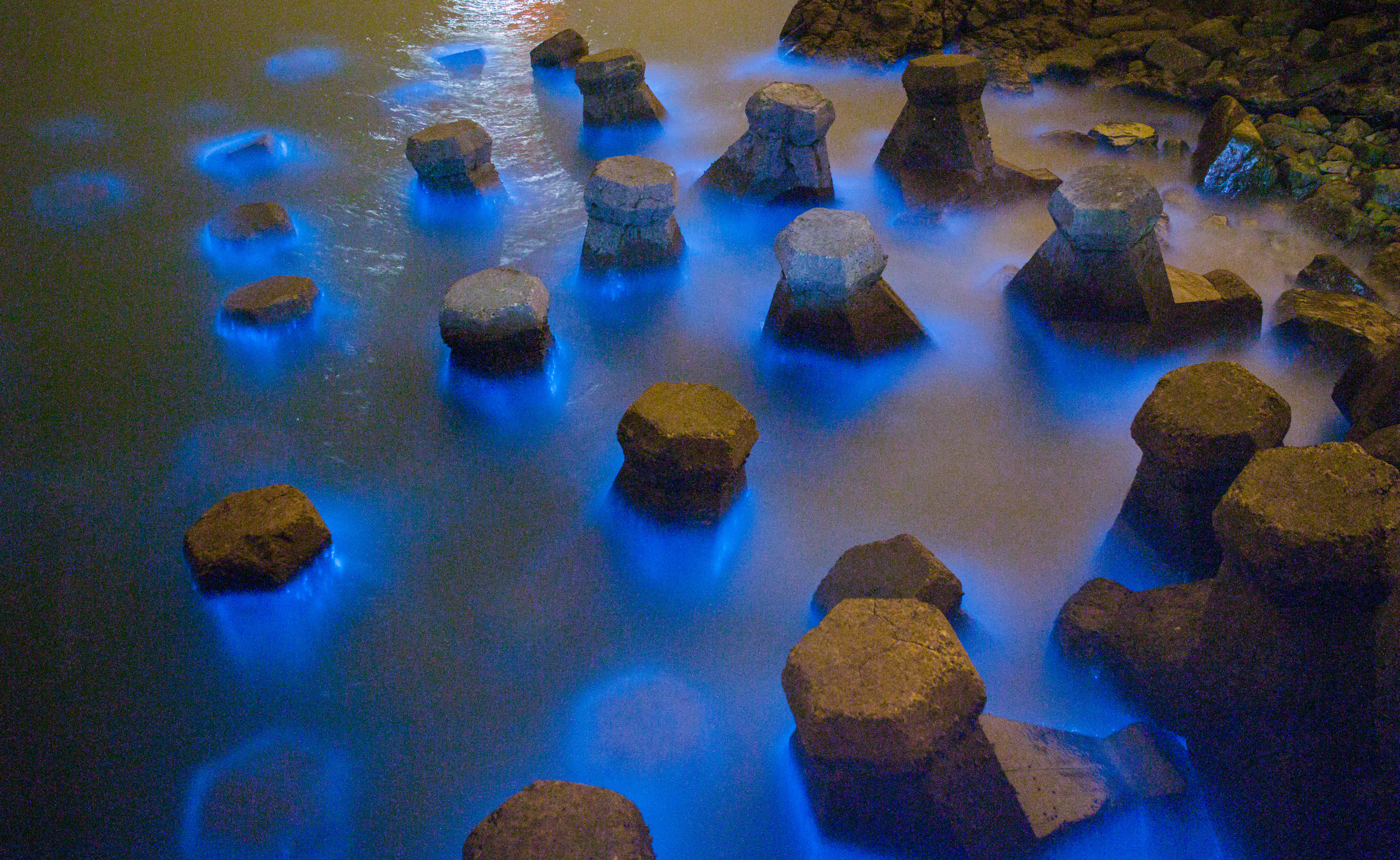
Blue tears

"Blue tears" is a phenomenon caused by a bloom of the plankton Vargula hilgendorfii. This animal radiates light when disturbed in turbulent water, thus creating a blue glow. This usually occurs in summer, during April to August. "Blue tears" attracts many tourists to Pingtan. However, a large outbreak of the phenomenon may harm the environment, as it depletes oxygen and releases toxins in the sea. This may cause a red tide.

== Economy ==
The island relies on tourism and anticipates that foreign investment will spur economic growth. The first major bridge to cross the Haitan Strait was completed in November 2010, connecting the island to Fuqing on the mainland. Spanning 4,976 meters (3 miles), it cost 1.4 billion RMB (about US$200 million) to build.

An 88.5 km (55 mile) long Fuzhou-Pingtan Railway (the Fuping Railway, 福平铁路), connecting Fuzhou to Pingtan Island, via Changle and a series of bridges, is under construction. The project was approved in November 2012. It was expected that the work would start by the end of the year, and was completed on December 26, 2020.

In early 2012, it was announced that a large cloud computing center would be built in Pingtan.

== Culture ==
A 430,000-square-foot (40,000 m^{2}) museum, the Pingtan Art Museum, is currently under construction in the island. The museum, designed by the Chinese-American firm MAD Studio on an artificial island, is scheduled for completion in 2016.

Longfengtou Beach

== Places of interest ==
Because of Pingtan's location, it experiences strong sea winds throughout the entire year. To combat the weather, villagers build their houses with rocks. The old traditional stone-built houses are resistant to wind and roaring waves. Moreover, the house are comfortable to live in. This special architectural style attracts many tourists and boosts economic growth. Beigang village is a famous fishing villages, featuring a large number of stone houses. Pingtan has a large ancient cultural building named Haitan Ancient City, a popular vacation site.

The flat beach in Pingtan is also an attractive destination, featuring a long coastline and pristine beach. Longfengtou Beach is a famous beach, covering about 21 hectares (52 acres), at 9.5 kilometers (6 miles) long. It is located next to Haitan Bay.

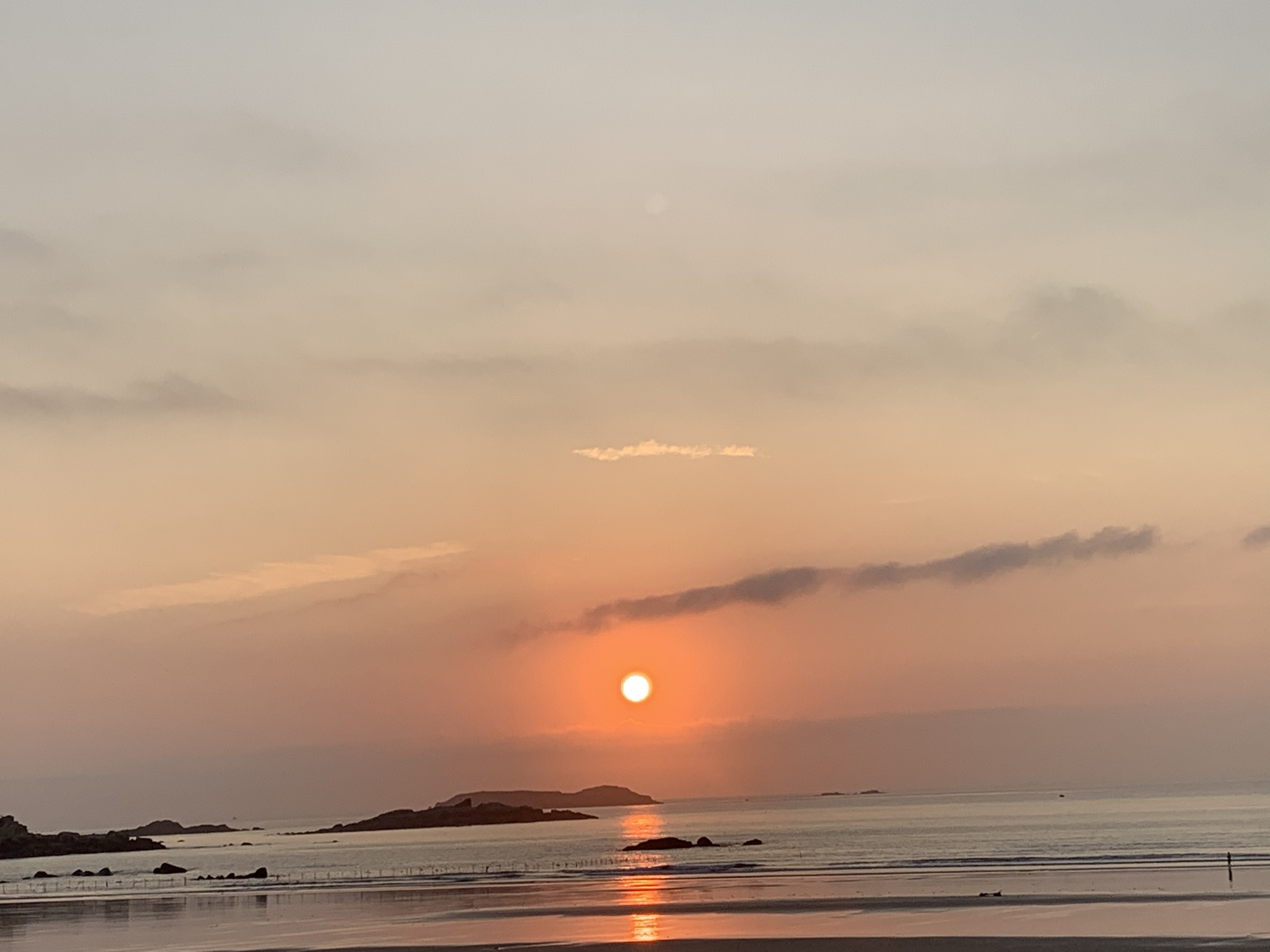
Sunrise in Longfengtou Beach

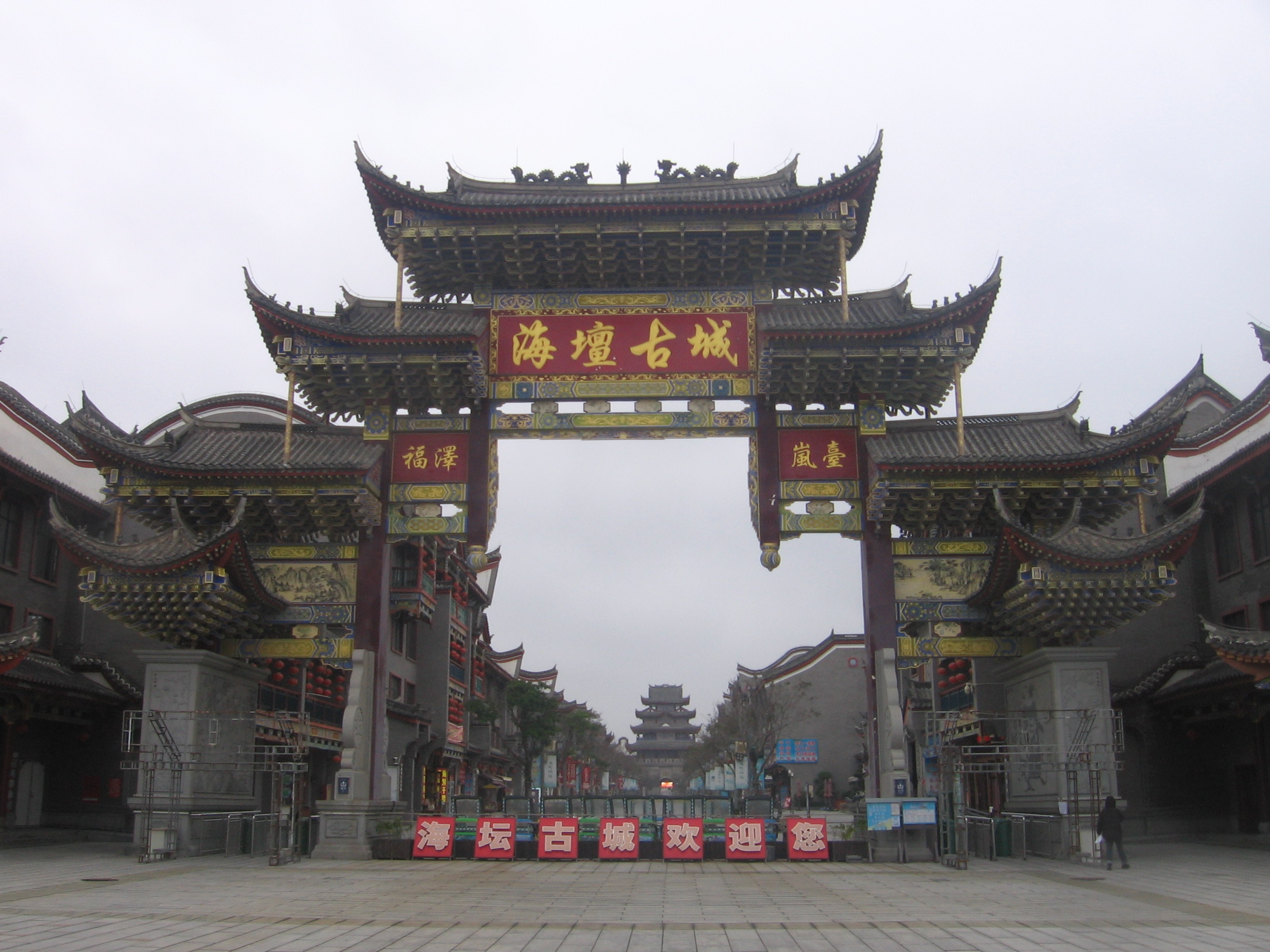
Haitan Ancient City

== Sports ==
At the 2017 China Sports Culture: Sports Tourism Expo, Pingtan was nominated as "2017 China's Top Ten Sports Tourism Destinations". In recent years, Pingtan has made use of its policy advantages, location advantages and natural resources advantages to successfully host several International Kite Surfing Festivals, International Cycling Opens, Open Water Swimming Championships, International Sailing Tournaments, National Beach Volleyball Tournaments, and World Fight Tournaments. Pingtan Sports Tourism Project has attracted widespread attention from the industry and tourists.

=== Kiteboarding ===
Because of the location, Pingtan is the region with the best wind conditions in China. The average annual wind reaches 20 knots. The best time for kiteboarding in Pingtan is from May to November. With the ideal wind condition and flat water, the LV beach becomes the most popular practice place in Pingtan. For people who come from afar, learning kitesurfing in Pingtan saves not only a lot of time and economic costs, but also could find the fun of kitesurfing in a short term. In Pingtan, most clubs adopt the IKO International Kite Surfing Association's teaching specifications. All training courses uses Ozone, Airush, and North kite surfing equipment. There are also many kiteboarding competition in Pingtan. In 2019 International Kiteboard Championship (Pingtan Station), there are nearly 150 contestants from 20 countries and regions. This is the largest kite surfing event held in Pingtan so far with the largest number of participants. 2019 International Kiteboard Championship (Pingtan Station) is authorized by the International Sailing Federation (WS) and the International Kite Surfing Association (IKA). The international competition level is divided into 200 points, and the total prize money of the competition reaches 50,000 US dollars.

A leading Chinese exponent of Formula Kite, Jingyue Chen, was born here and she competed in the 19th Asian Games here and took the gold medal. She is China's contestant for the event at the 2024 Olympic Games.

=== Cycling ===
There are many cycling competitions held in Pingtan, including the "Ocean Cup" China Pingtan International Cycling Open, founded in 2014 as one of the series of events of "6.8 World Ocean Day and National Ocean Promotion Day". The number of participants set a record for domestic cycling single-day events for three consecutive years.

== Transportation ==
The transportation in Pingtan is rapidly developing. Since it is the closest place between mainland China and Taiwan, the government attaches great importance to its transportation.

=== Ferry ===
Pingtan is linked with Taichung and Kaohsiung in Taiwan by Haixia ferry, departing from Aoqian Wharf.

=== High-speed rail ===
Pingtan High-speed Railway Station in Zhonglou township opened in December 2020 as the terminus of the Fuping Railway, incorporating the Pingtan Strait Road-Rail Bridge, China's first road-rail bridge.

=== Roads ===
Pingtan toll station

14 bus routes operate in the area, with the Pingtan New Automobile Passenger Terminal as the main hub since 2021.

=== Bicycles ===
A bus rental scheme, the Pingtan Public Bicycle Project, with 52 bicycle stations and 2,000 cycles, has been in operation since May 2017.

== Maps ==
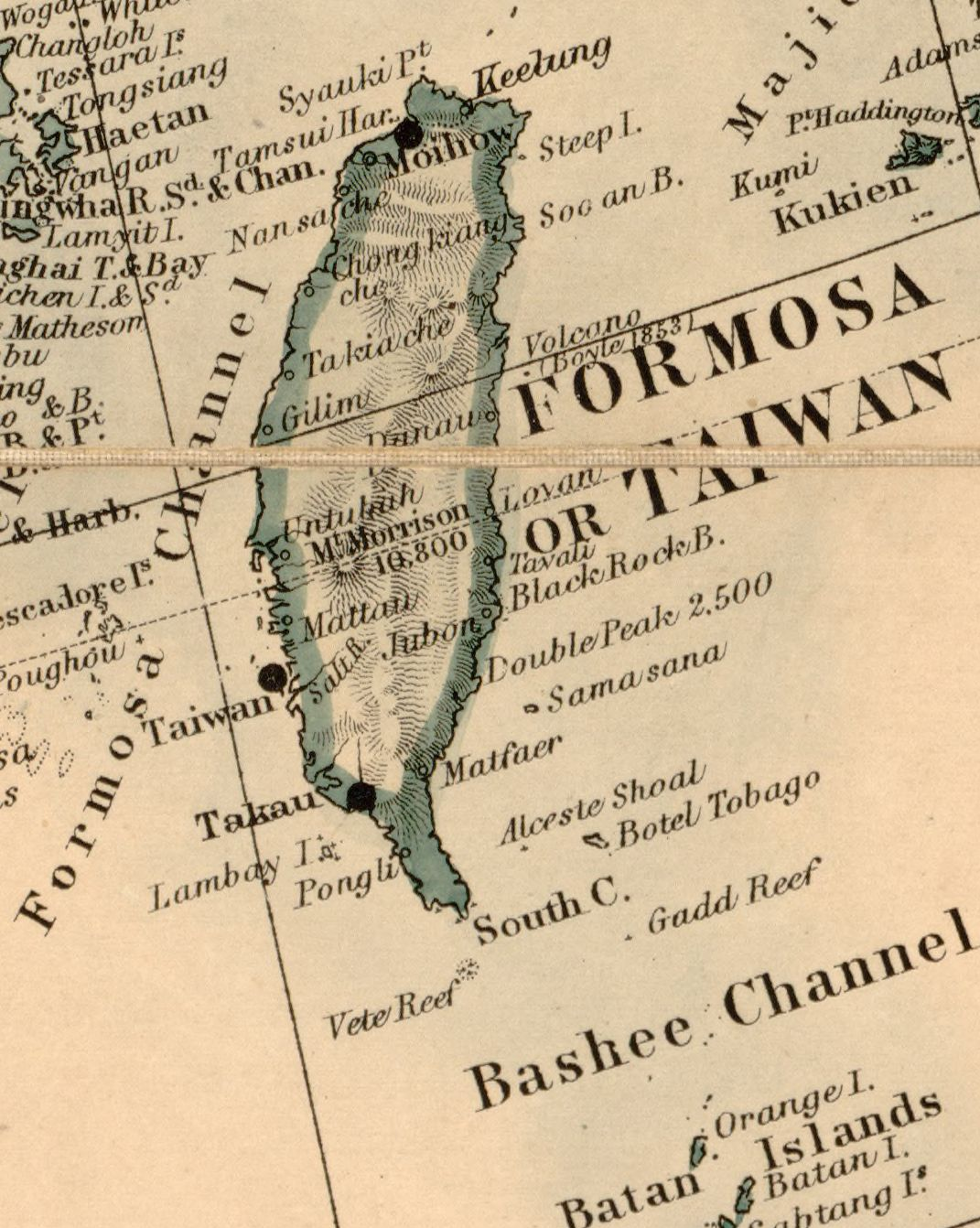
Map of the area including Haetan (1880)

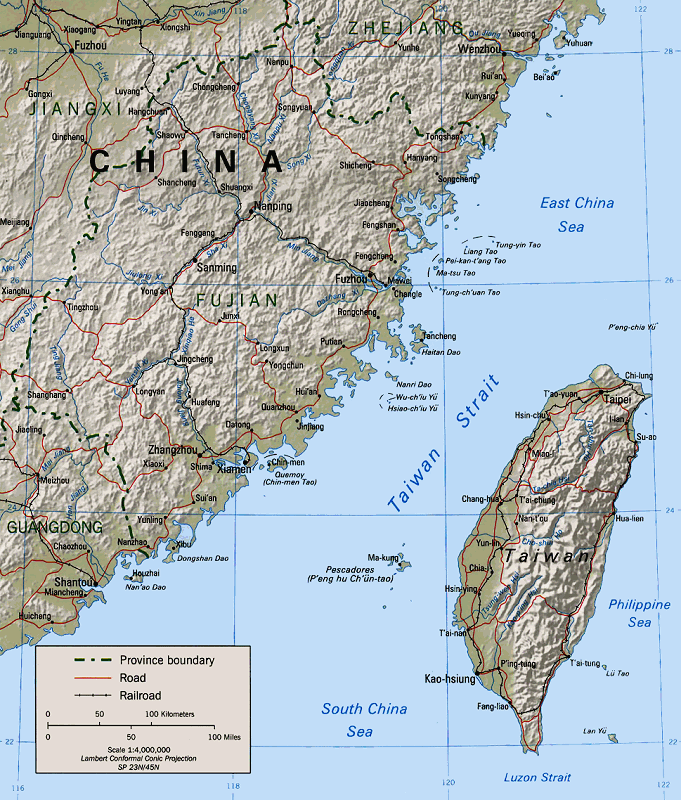
Map including Pingtan Island (labeled as Haitan Dao)

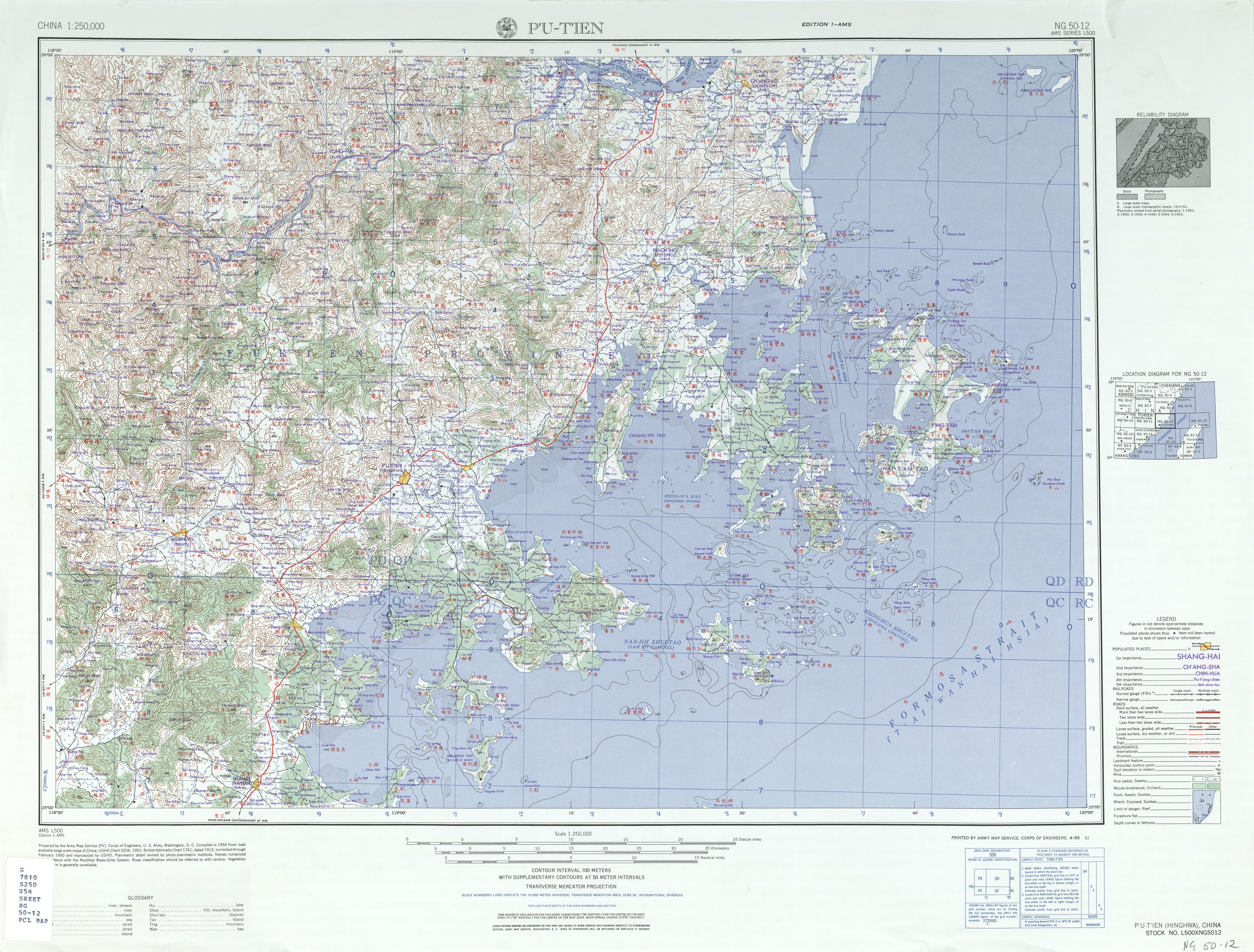
Map including Pingtan Island (labelled as P'ING-T'AN 平潭) (AMS, 1954)

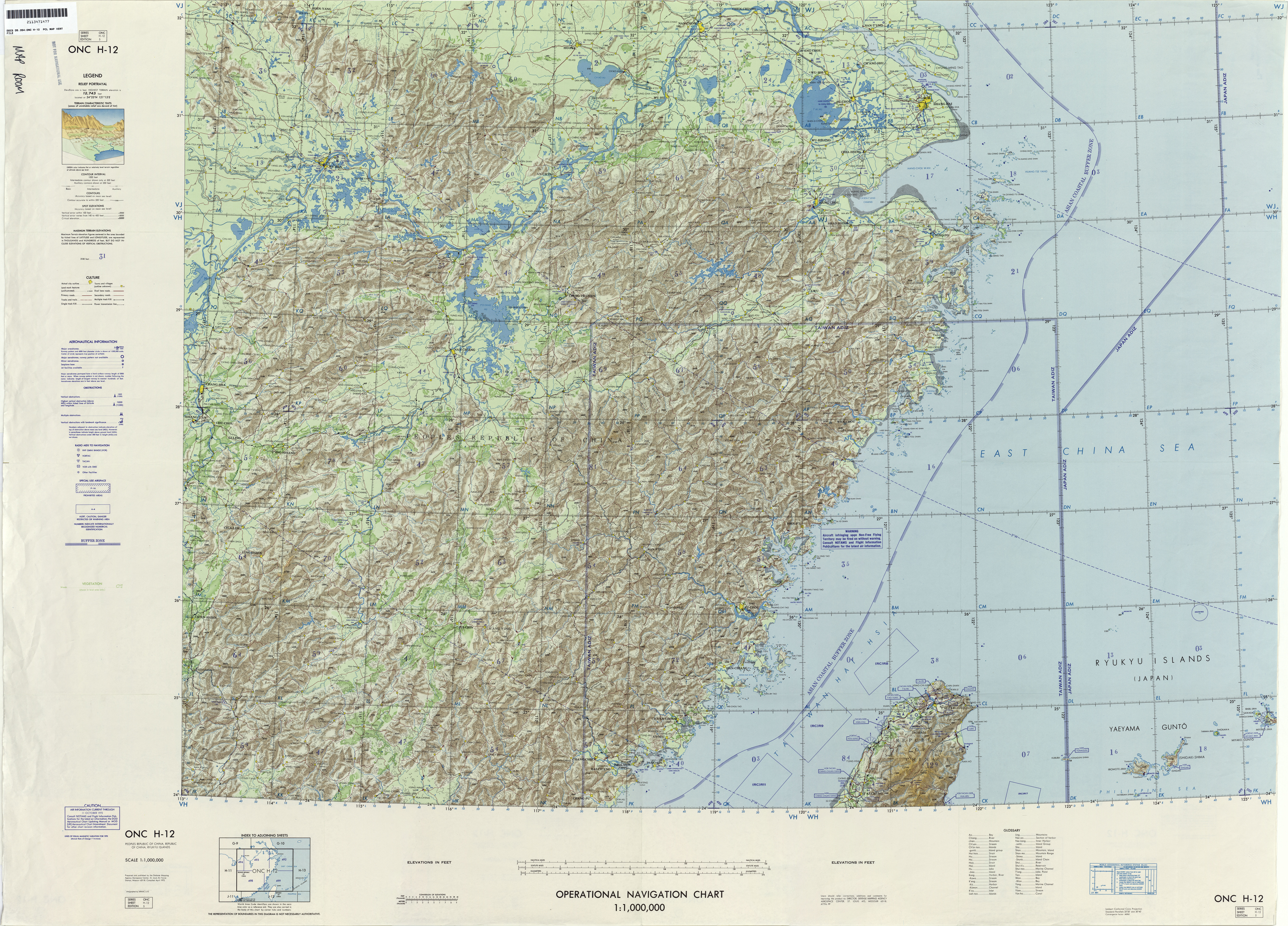
Map including Pingtan Island (labeled as HAI-T'AN TAO) (DMA, 1972)

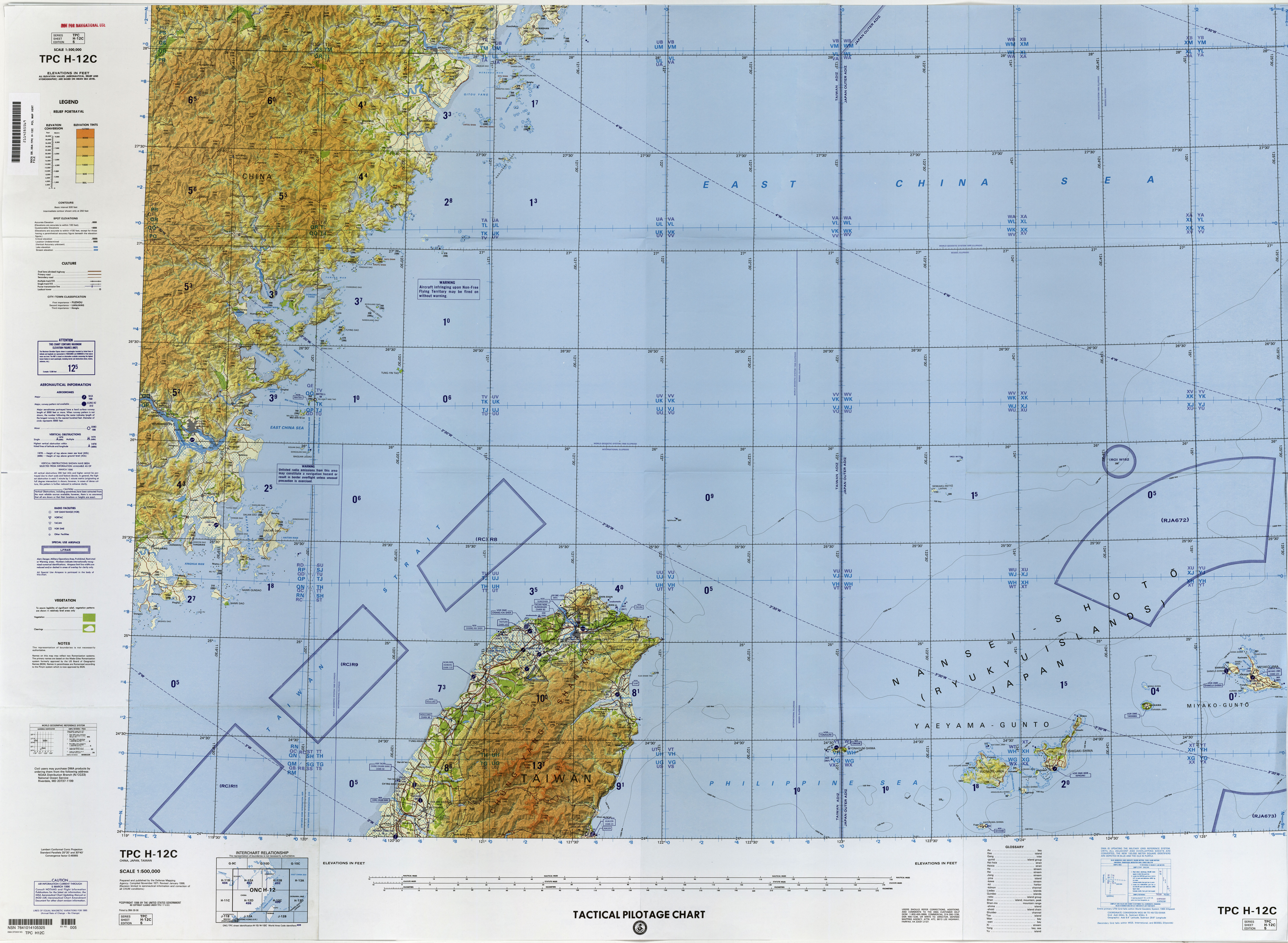
Map including Pingtan Island (labeled as HAITAN DAO) (DMA, 1996)

== See also ==
- List of islands of Fujian
- Niushan Island
- Fuzhou–Pingtan railway
