= Tancheng, Pingtan County =

Tancheng 潭城镇
- Town
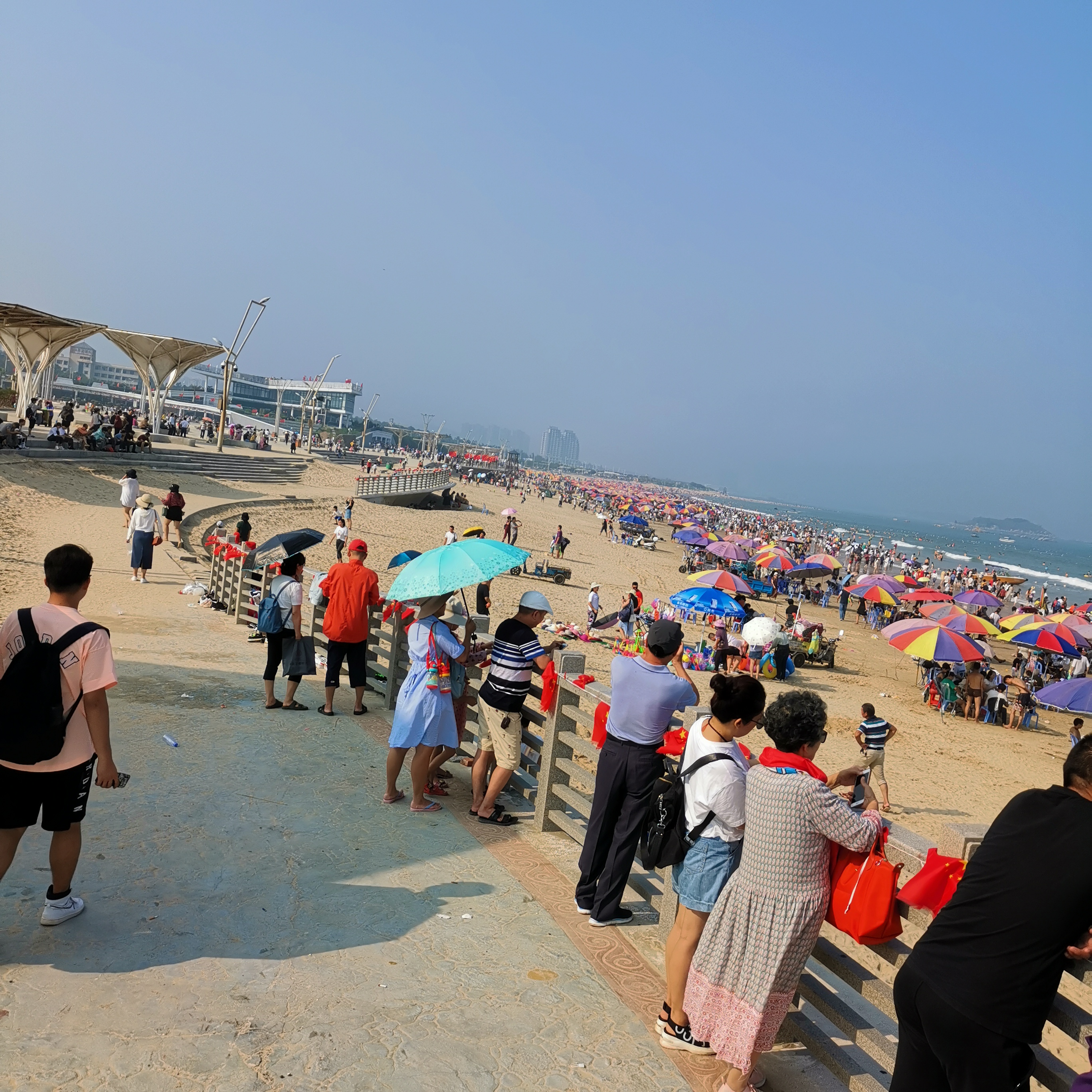
- Longfengtou Coast Park (龙凤头海滨公园)

- Location in Fujian Tancheng (China)
- Coordinates: 25.504362°N 119.786523°E
- Country: China
- Province: Fujian
- Prefecture-level city: Fuzhou
- County: Pingtan
- Village-level divisions: 15 residential communities 4 villages

Area
  - Total: 12.1 km^{2} (4.7 sq mi)

Population (2020)
  - Total: 119,784
  - Density: 9,900/km^{2} (25,600/sq mi)
- Time zone: UTC+8 (China Standard)

Tancheng (潭城镇) is the seat of Pingtan County, in Fuzhou, Fujian, China (PRC) seating its executive, legislature, judiciary, Chinese Communist Party and PSB branches. It is located on Haitan Island.

== History ==
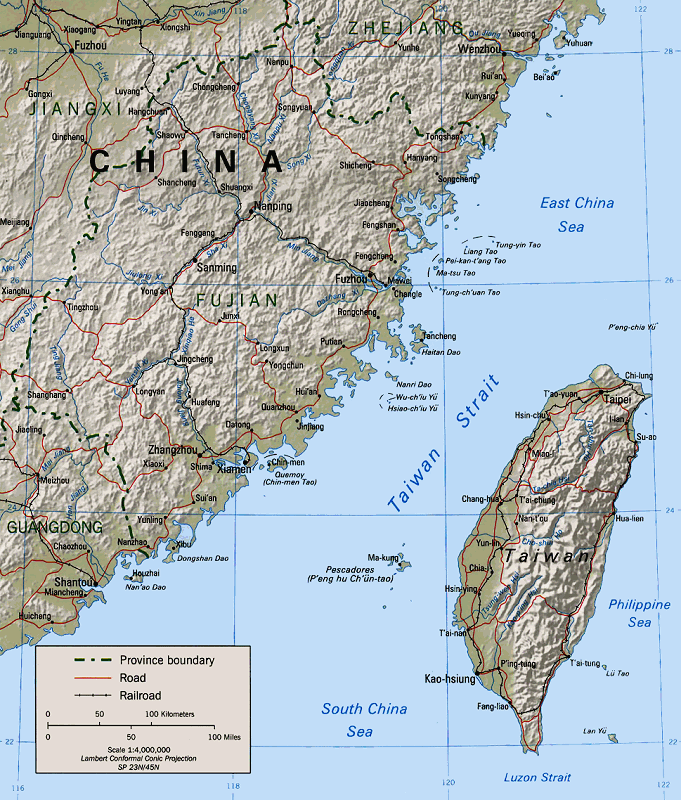
Map including Tancheng in the Taiwan Strait

In 1961, Tancheng Commune (潭城公社) was established.

In 1980, Chengguan Town (城关镇) was established, which was renamed Tancheng Town in 1982.

On March 29, 2013, a woman surnamed Wen in Tancheng lost 305,000 RMB to someone pretending to be her brother on QQ.

On April 15, 2013, Chen Shixiong was appointed town-level Chinese Communist Party (CCP) secretary of Tancheng at the sixth plenary session of the 12th CCP Pingtan Committee.

On August 8–9, 2015, Typhoon Soudelor brought winds measured at 36.3 meters per second in Tancheng, the highest in downtown Pingtan since 1971.

On September 27–28, 2016, Typhoon Megi brought torrential rains across Pingtan, including Tancheng.

== Administrative divisions ==
The town administers 15 residential communities and 4 village committees:

=== Residential communities ===
- Yuanmen (辕门社区)
- Youying (右营社区)
- Ruilong (瑞龙社区)
- Chengdong (城东社区)
- Hongshan (红山社区)
- Baohu (宝湖社区)
- Zhongpu (中埔社区)
- Guishan (桂山社区)
- Bailu (白鹭社区)
- Dongmen (东门社区)
- Jialin (佳林社区)
- Zhushan (竹园社区)
- Xiaohu (小湖社区)
- Wujing (武警社区)
- Kanhu (看守社区)

=== Villages ===
- Chengbei (城北村)
- Chengnan (城南村)
- Chengzhong (城中村)
- Beimen (北门村)

== Demographics ==
Historical population
Year	Pop.	±% p.a.
2000	65,728	—
2010	111,447	+5.42%
2020	119,784	+0.72%

In 2020, Tancheng's population was 119,784.

== See also ==
- List of township-level divisions of Fujian
