= Huluzhen station =

Metro station in Fuzhou, Fujian, China

Huluzhen 葫芦阵
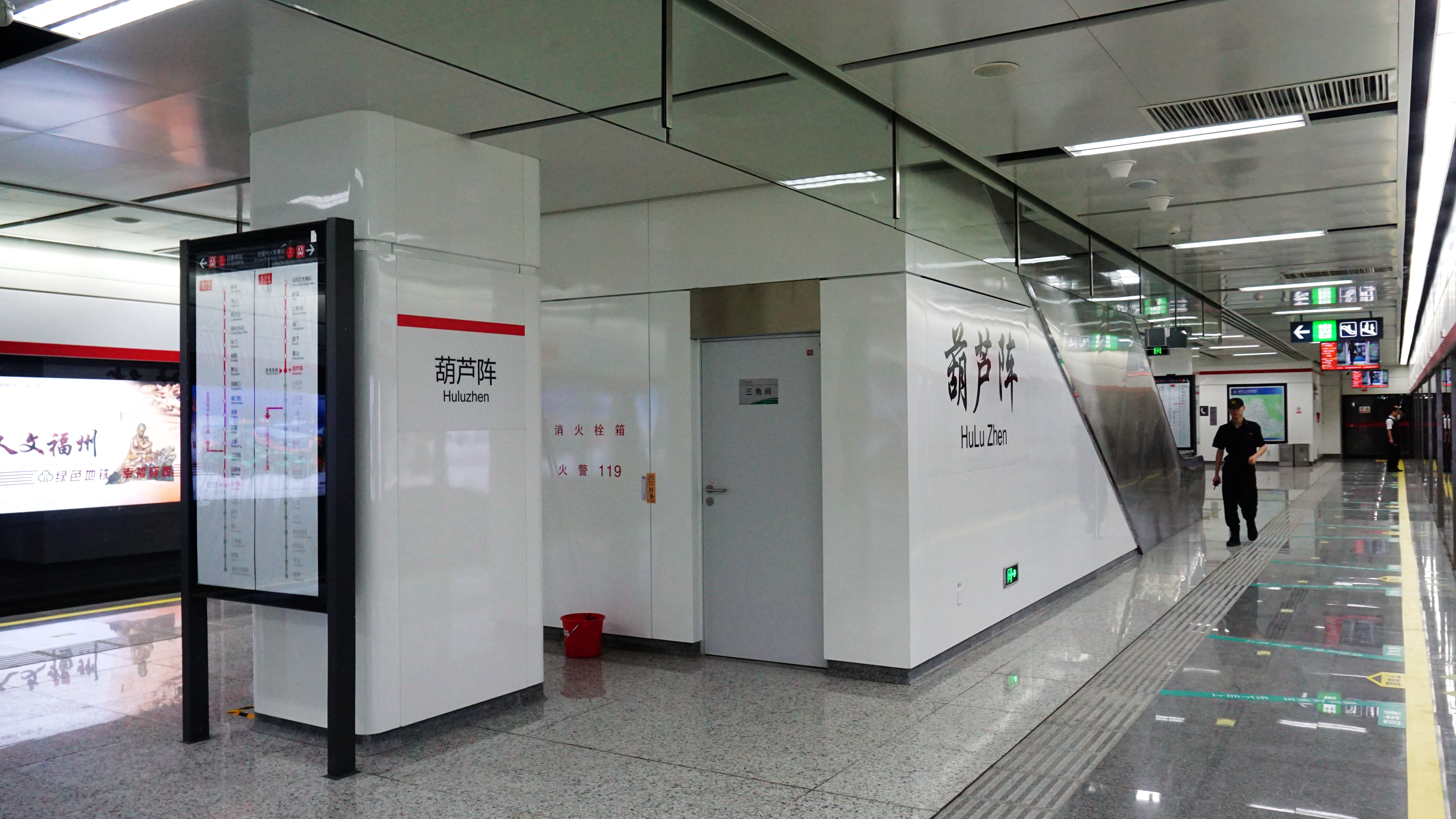

General information
- Location: Cangshan District, Fuzhou, Fujian; China
- Coordinates: 26°01′02″N 119°20′36″E
- Operated by: Fuzhou Metro Co. Ltd.
- Line(s): Line 1
- Platforms: 2

Construction
- Structure type: Underground

History
- Opened: May 18, 2016

Services
Preceding station	Fuzhou Metro	Following station
Baihuting towards Xiangfeng	Line 1	Huangshan towards Sanjiangkou

Huluzhen Station (Chinese: 葫芦阵站; pinyin: Húluzhèn zhàn; Fuzhounese: [hu˨˩ lu˨˩ lɛŋ˨˦˨]) is a metro station of Line 1 of the Fuzhou Metro. It is located at the intersection of Zexu Avenue and Gaowang Road in Cangshan District, Fuzhou, Fujian, China. It started operation on May 18, 2016.
