= Chengmen station =

Metro station in Fuzhou, China

Chengmen 城门
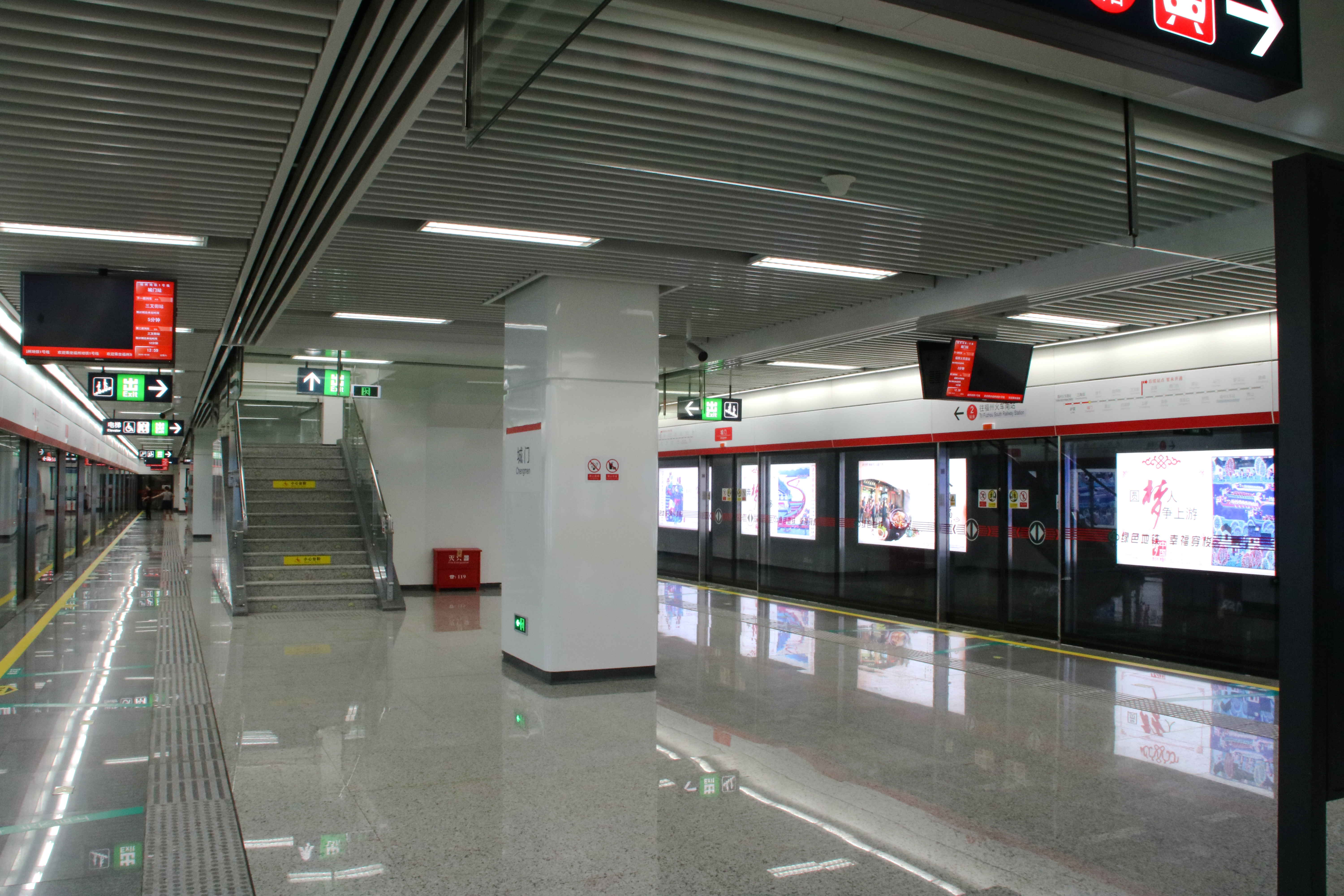
- Line 1 platform

General information
- Location: Cangshan District, Fuzhou, Fujian; China
- Coordinates: 25.9966842°N 119.3598382°E
- Operated by: Fuzhou Metro Co. Ltd.
- Lines: Line 1 Line 4
- Platforms: 4 (2 island platforms)

Construction
- Structure type: Underground

History
- Opened: Line 1: May 18, 2016; Line 4: August 27, 2023

Services
Preceding station	Fuzhou Metro	Following station
Paixia towards Xiangfeng	Line 1	Sanjiaocheng towards Sanjiangkou
Linpu towards Banzhou	Line 4	Luozhou Wenquan towards Difengjiang
Location

Chengmen Station (Chinese: 城门站; pinyin: Chéngmén zhàn; Fuzhounese: [t͡sʰiɑ˥˥ muoŋ˥˧]) is a metro station of Line 1 and Line 4 of the Fuzhou Metro. It is located at the intersection of Fuxia Road and Guihua Road, south of South 3rd-Ring Road in Cangshan District, Fuzhou, Fujian, China. It started operation on May 18, 2016.

== Gallery ==
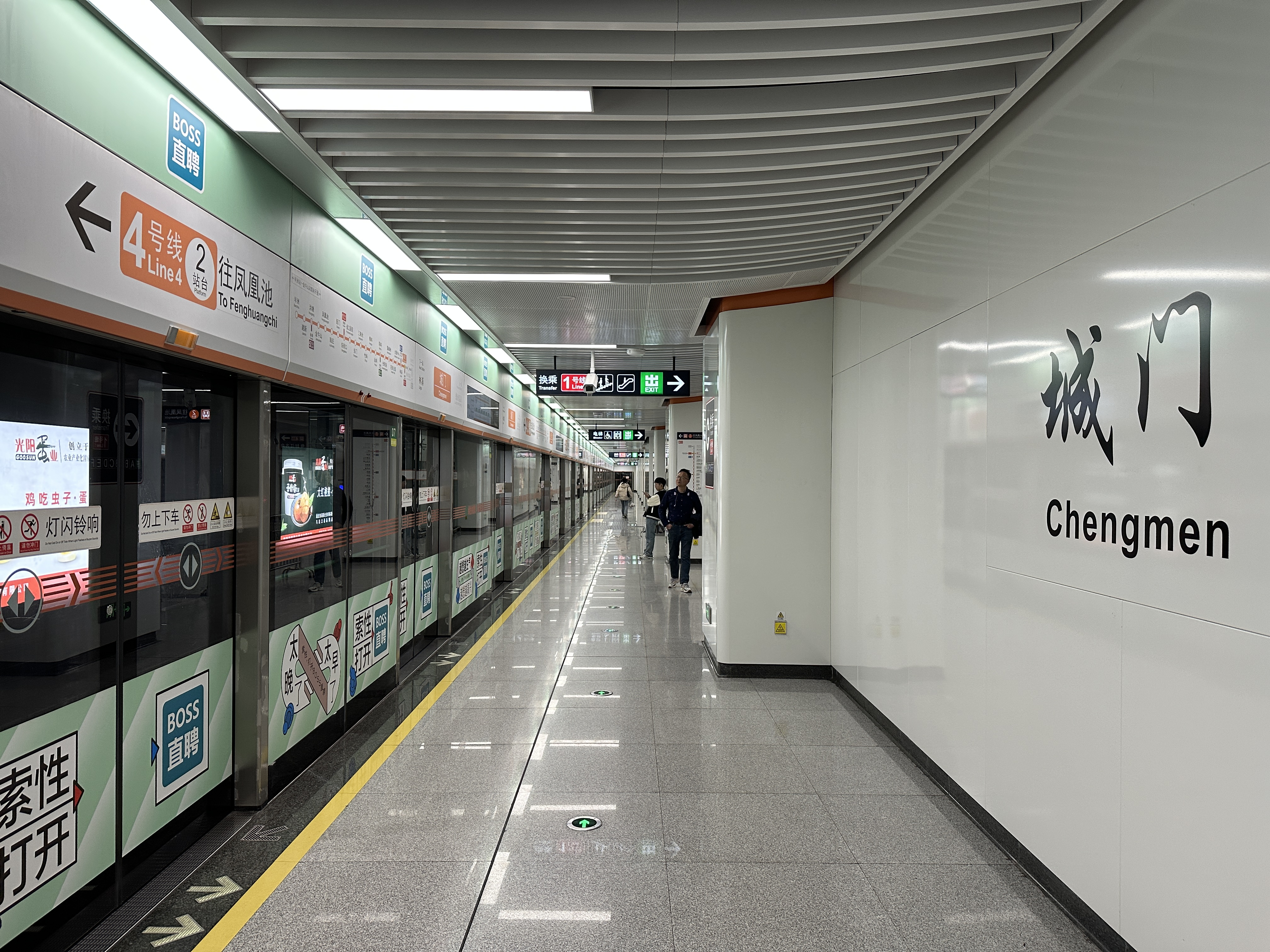
Line 4 platform
