= Baihuting station =

Metro station in Fuzhou, China

Baihuting 白湖亭
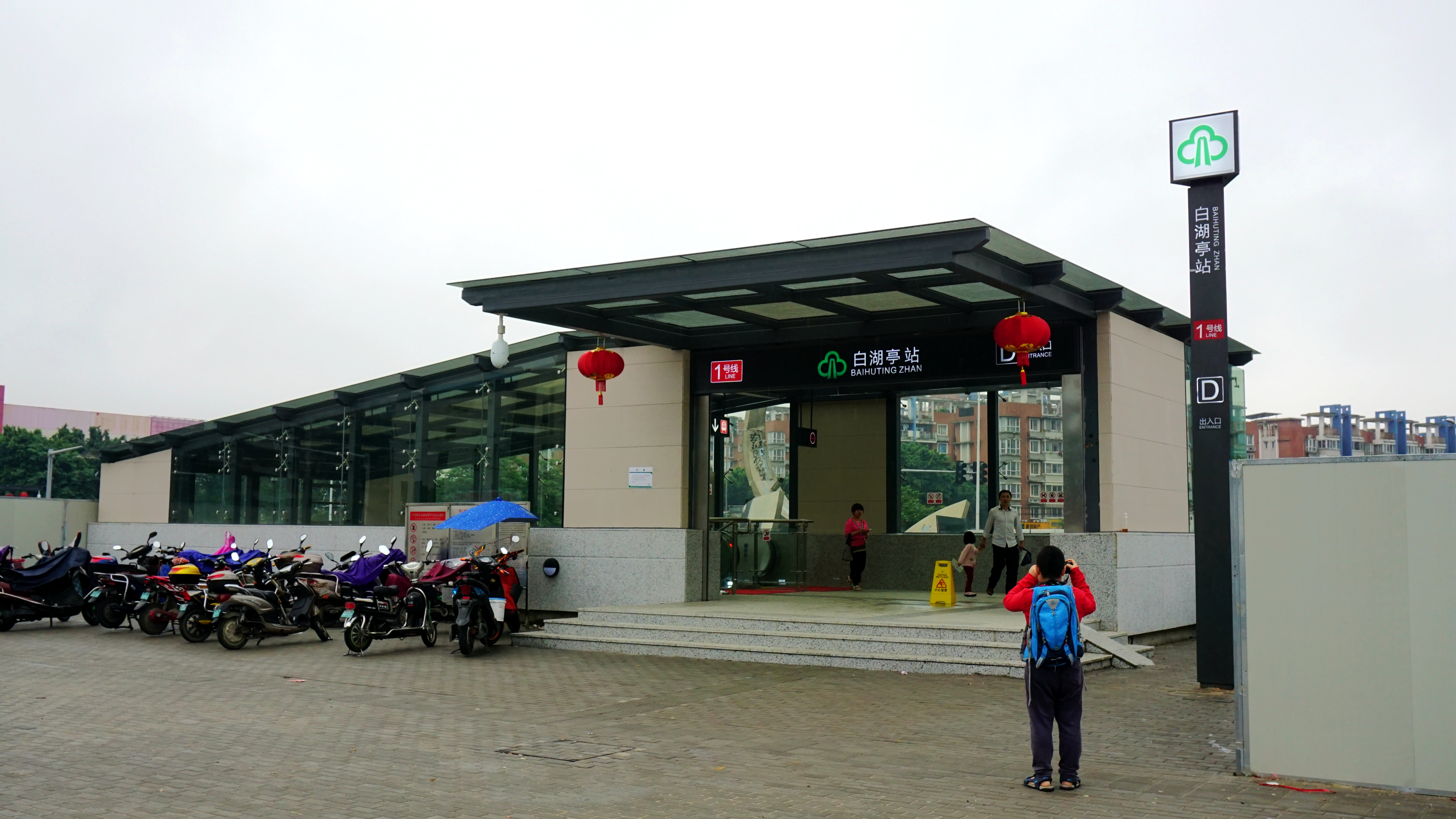

General information
- Location: Cangshan District, Fuzhou, Fujian; China
- Coordinates: 26°01′32″N 119°20′08″E
- Operated by: Fuzhou Metro Co. Ltd.
- Line(s): Line 1
- Platforms: 2

Construction
- Structure type: Underground

History
- Opened: May 18, 2016

Services
Preceding station	Fuzhou Metro	Following station
Sanchajie towards Xiangfeng	Line 1	Huluzhen towards Sanjiangkou

Baihuting Station (Chinese: 白湖亭站; pinyin: Báihútíng zhàn; Fuzhounese: [pa˥˥ u˥˥ liŋ˥˧]) is a metro station of Line 1 of the Fuzhou Metro. It is located on Zexu Avenue in Cangshan District, Fuzhou, Fujian, China. It started operation on May 18, 2016.
