= Sanchajie station =

Metro station in Fuzhou, China

Sanchajie 三叉街
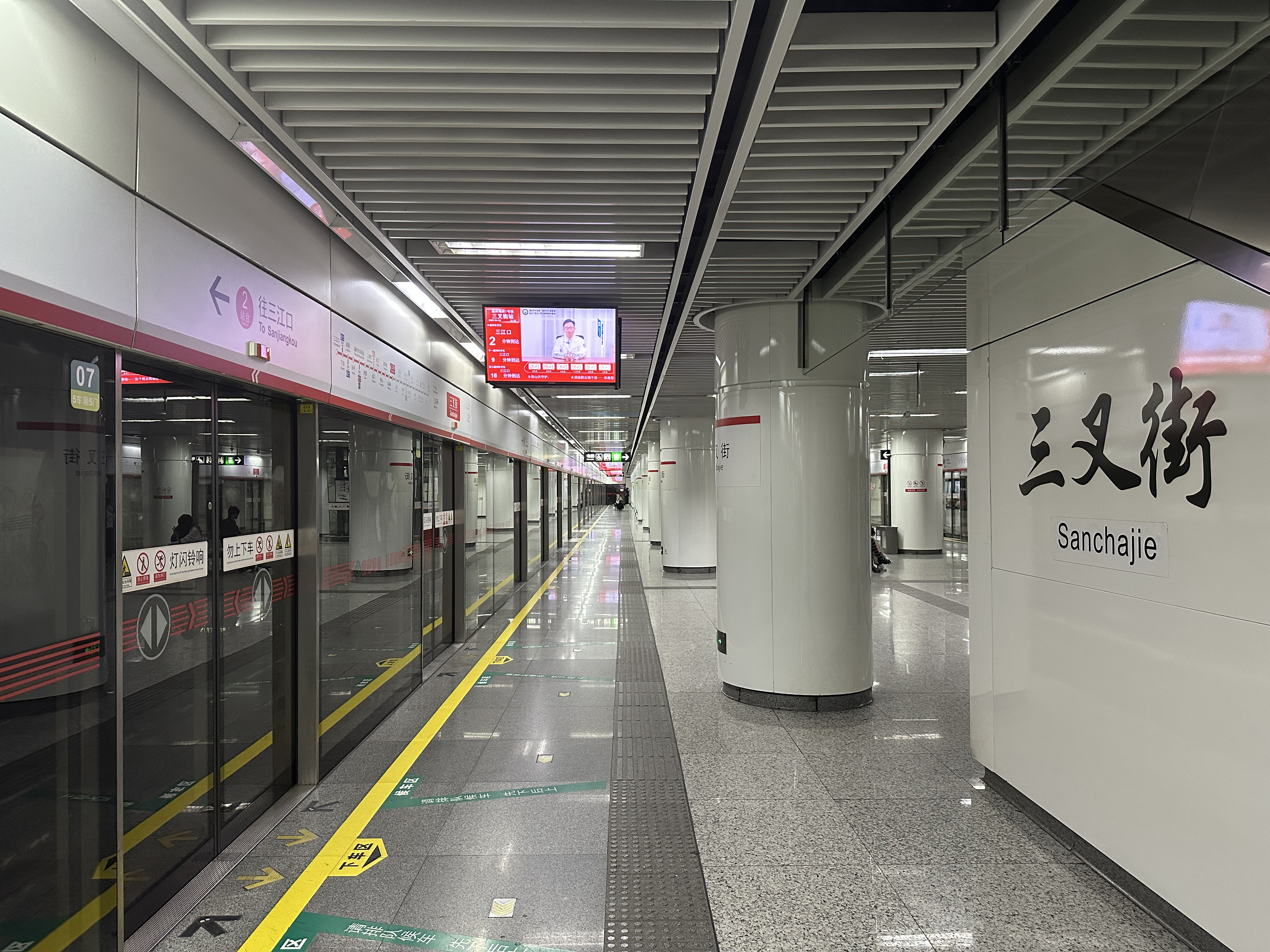

General information
- Location: Cangshan District, Fuzhou, Fujian; China
- Coordinates: 26°02′07″N 119°19′35″E
- Operated by: Fuzhou Metro Co. Ltd.
- Lines: Line 1 Binhai Express
- Platforms: 2

Construction
- Structure type: Underground

History
- Opened: Line 1: May 18, 2016; Binhai Express: September 29, 2025

Services
Preceding station	Fuzhou Metro	Following station
Shangteng towards Xiangfeng	Line 1	Baihuting towards Sanjiangkou
Nangongyuan towards Fuzhou Railway Station	Binhai Express	Difengjiang towards Wenling
Location

Sanchajie Station (Chinese: 三叉街站; pinyin: Sānchājiē zhàn; Fuzhounese: [saŋ˨˩ ʒa˥˥ ɛ˥˥]) is a metro station of Line 1 and Binhai Express line of the Fuzhou Metro. Sanchajie Station is separated into two different stations: Sanchajie Station and Sanchajie _{(Binhai Express)} Station. Sanchajie Station is located at the intersection of Shangsan Road, South Liuyi Road and Zexu Avenue, while Sanchajie _{(Binhai Express)} Station is located at the intersection of Shangsan Road and South Tai Road in Cangshan District, Fuzhou, Fujian, China. Transferring between these stations requires an OSI (Out of System Interchange). Sanchajie Station started operation on May 18, 2016. Sanchajie _{(Binhai Express)} Station started operation on September 29, 2025. Sanchajie Station was once the terminus of this line until the opening of northern section on 6 January 2017.
