= Sanjiaocheng station =

Metro station in Fuzhou, China

Sanjiaocheng 三角埕
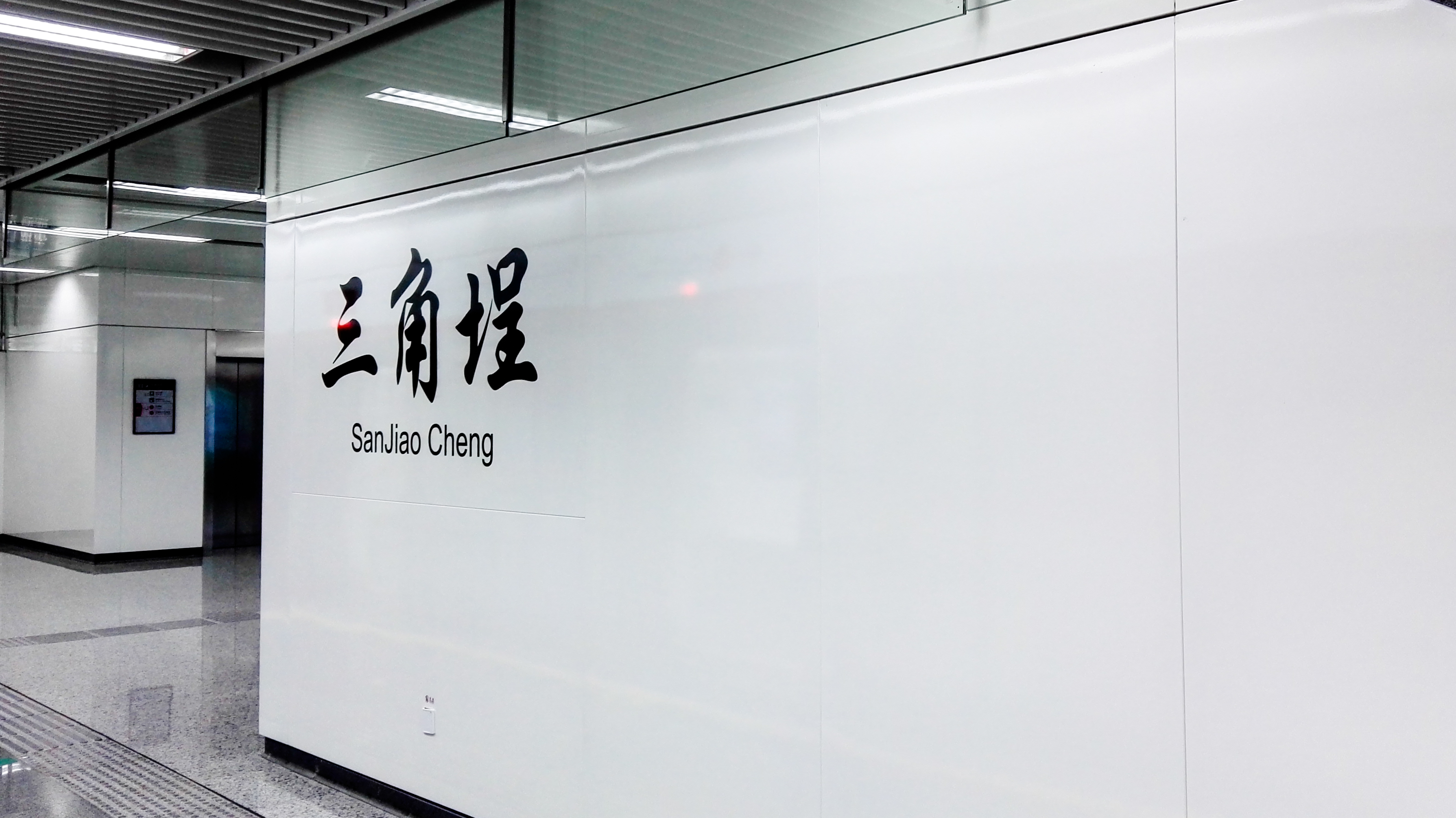

General information
- Location: Cangshan District, Fuzhou, Fujian; China
- Coordinates: 25.9907220°N 119.3686948°E
- Operated by: Fuzhou Metro Co. Ltd.
- Line(s): Line 1
- Platforms: 2

Construction
- Structure type: Underground

History
- Opened: May 18, 2016

Services
Preceding station	Fuzhou Metro	Following station
Chengmen towards Xiangfeng	Line 1	Lulei towards Sanjiangkou

Sanjiaocheng Station (Chinese: 三角埕站; pinyin: Sānjiǎochéng zhàn; Fuzhounese: [saŋ˨˩ ŋø˨˩ liaŋ˥˧]) is a metro station of Line 1 of the Fuzhou Metro. It is located on Fuxia Road, south of Chengmen Town Government in Cangshan District, Fuzhou, Fujian, China. It started operation on May 18, 2016.

== Station layout ==
G	Street level	Exits
B1	Concourse	Customer Service, Automatic Ticketing Machines
B2; Platforms	Platform 1	← Line 1 towards Xiangfeng (Chengmen)
B2; Platforms	Island platform, doors will open on the left
B2; Platforms	Platform 2	Line 1 towards Sanjiangkou (Lulei)→

== Exits ==
Exit number	Exit location
Exit A	North of Fuxia Road
Exit B (Reserved)	South of Fuxia Road
Exit C	South of Fuxia Road
Exit D	North of Fuxia Road
