= Huangshan station =

Metro station in Fuzhou, China

Huangshan 黄山
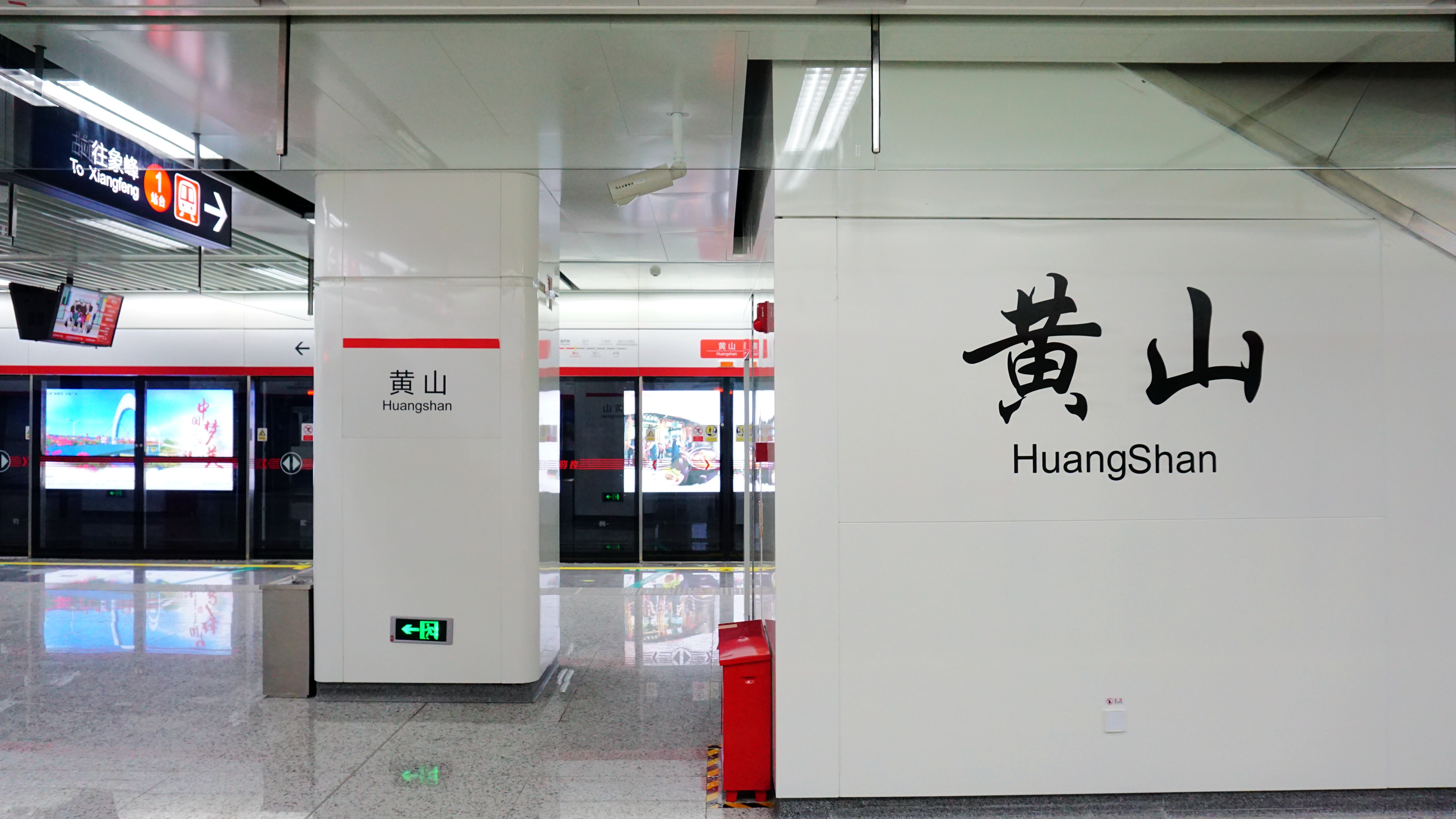

General information
- Location: Cangshan District, Fuzhou, Fujian; China
- Coordinates: 26°00′35″N 119°20′56″E
- Operated by: Fuzhou Metro Co. Ltd.
- Line(s): Line 1
- Platforms: 2

Construction
- Structure type: Underground

History
- Opened: May 18, 2016

Services
Preceding station	Fuzhou Metro	Following station
Huluzhen towards Xiangfeng	Line 1	Paixia towards Sanjiangkou

Huangshan Station (Chinese: 黄山站; pinyin: Huángshān zhàn; Fuzhounese: [uoŋ˥˥ laŋ˥˥]) is a metro station of Line 1 of the Fuzhou Metro. It is located on Fuxia Road, south of Fuzhou-Quanzhou Express Link in Cangshan District, Fuzhou, Fujian, China. It started operation on May 18, 2016.

== Station layout ==
G	Street level	Exits
B1	Concourse	Customer Service, Automatic Ticketing Machines
B2; Platforms	Platform 1	← Line 1 towards Xiangfeng (Huluzhen)
B2; Platforms	Island platform, doors will open on the left
B2; Platforms	Platform 2	Line 1 towards Sanjiangkou (Paixia)→

== Exits ==
Exit number	Exit location
Exit A	South of Pandun Road, East of Fuxia Road
Exit B	South of Yexia Road, West of Fuxia Road
Exit C	North of Jiujiang Road, East of Fuxia Road
