= Lulei station =

Metro station in Fuzhou, China

Lulei 胪雷
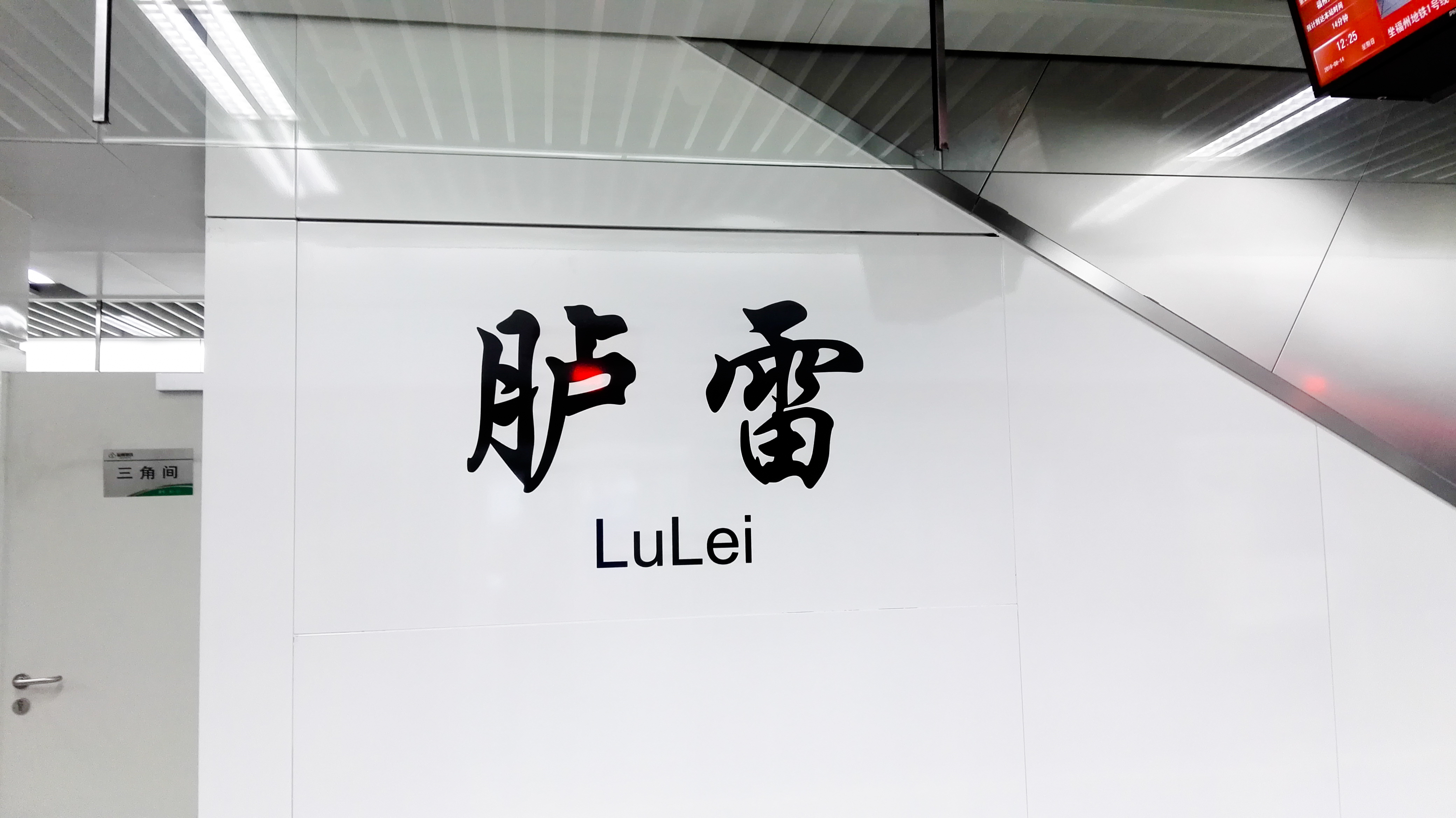

General information
- Location: Cangshan District, Fuzhou, Fujian; China
- Coordinates: 25.98490529°N 119.3800768°E
- Operated by: Fuzhou Metro Co. Ltd.
- Line(s): Line 1
- Platforms: 2

Construction
- Structure type: Underground

History
- Opened: May 18, 2016

Services
Preceding station	Fuzhou Metro	Following station
Sanjiaocheng towards Xiangfeng	Line 1	Fuzhou South Railway Station towards Sanjiangkou

Lulei Station (Chinese: 胪雷站; pinyin: Lúléi zhàn; Fuzhounese: [lu˥˥ lɔy˥˧]) is a metro station of Line 1 of the Fuzhou Metro. It is located Anqianer Road near Yongnan Road and Fuxia Road in Cangshan District, Fuzhou, Fujian, China. It started operation on May 18, 2016.

== Station layout ==
G	Street level	Exits
B1	Concourse	Customer Service, Automatic Ticketing Machines
B2; Platforms	Platform 1	← Line 1 towards Xiangfeng (Sanjiaocheng)
B2; Platforms	Island platform, doors will open on the left
B2; Platforms	Platform 2	Line 1 towards Sanjiangkou (Fuzhou South Railway Station)→

== Exits ==
Exit number	Exit location
Exit A2	South of Yongnan Road, East of Fuxia Road
Exit A3	South of Yongnan Road, East of Fuxia Road
Exit B	South of Yongnan Road, East of Fuxia Road
Exit C	South of Yongnan Road, East of Fuxia Road
