= Paixia station =

Metro station in Fuzhou, China

Paixia 排下
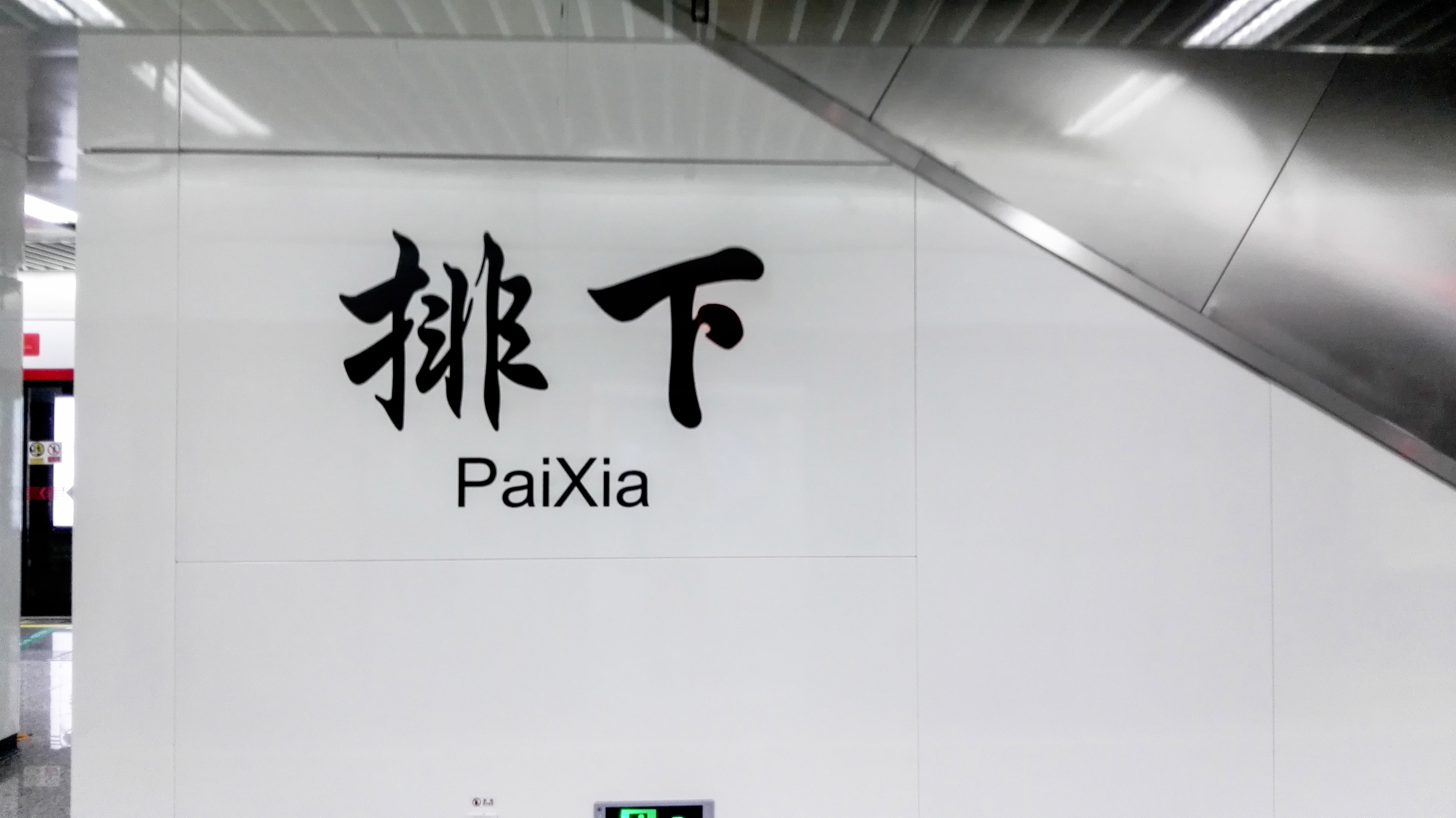

General information
- Location: Cangshan District, Fuzhou, Fujian; China
- Coordinates: 26.0020563°N 119.3536141°E
- Operated by: Fuzhou Metro Co. Ltd.
- Line(s): Line 1
- Platforms: 2

Construction
- Structure type: Underground

History
- Opened: May 18, 2016

Services
Preceding station	Fuzhou Metro	Following station
Huangshan towards Xiangfeng	Line 1	Chengmen towards Sanjiangkou

Paixia Station (Chinese: 排下站; pinyin: Páixià zhàn; Fuzhounese: [pɛ˨˩ ɑ˨˦˨]) is a metro station of Line 1 of the Fuzhou Metro. It is located on the south of the intersection of Fuxia Road and South 3rd-Ring Road in Cangshan District, Fuzhou, Fujian, China. It started operation on May 18, 2016.

== Station layout ==
G	Street level	Exits
B1	Concourse	Customer Service, Automatic Ticketing Machines
B2; Platforms	Platform 1	← Line 1 towards Xiangfeng (Huangshan)
B2; Platforms	Island platform, doors will open on the left
B2; Platforms	Platform 2	Line 1 towards Sanjiangkou (Chengmen)→

== Exits ==
Exit number	Exit location
Exit A	North of South 3rd-Ring (Sanhuan) Road, West of Fuxia Road
Exit B	North of South 3rd-Ring (Sanhuan) Road, West of Fuxia Road
Exit C	North of South 3rd-Ring (Sanhuan) Road, East of Fuxia Road
