= Doumen station =

Doumen station can refer to:

- Doumen station (Fuzhou Metro), a station on Line 1 (Fuzhou Metro)
- Doumen station (Nanchang Metro), a station on Line 3 (Nanchang Metro)
- Doumen station (Xi'an Metro), a station on Line 5 (Xi'an Metro)
