= Pingshan station (Fuzhou Metro) =

Metro station in Fuzhou, China

Pingshan 屏山
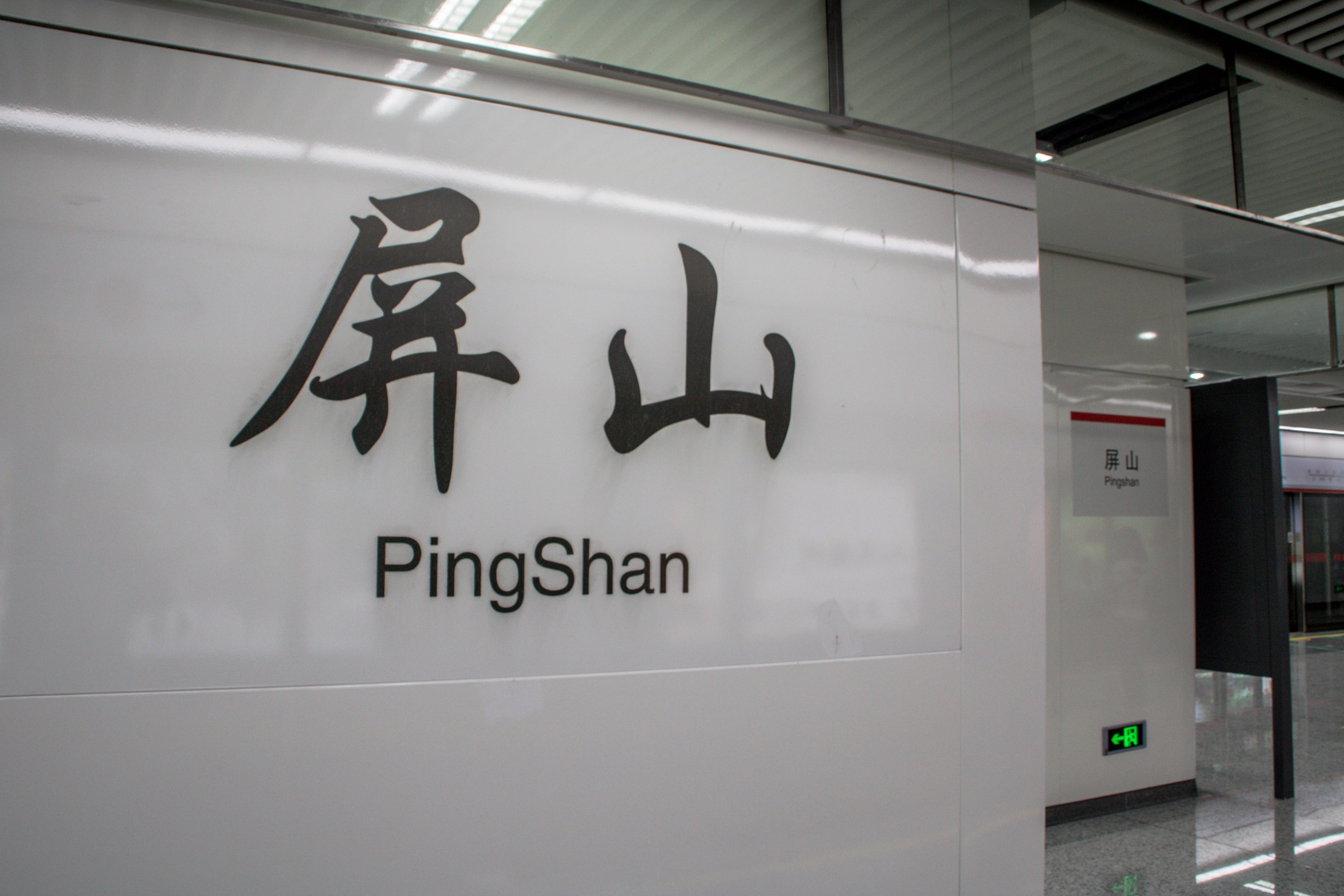

General information
- Location: Gulou District, Fuzhou, Fujian; China
- Coordinates: 26.0993849°N 119.2922902°E
- Operator: Fuzhou Metro Co., Ltd.
- Line: Line 1
- Platforms: 2

Construction
- Structure type: Underground

History
- Opened: 6 January 2017

Services
Preceding station	Fuzhou Metro	Following station
Shudou towards Xiangfeng	Line 1	Dongjiekou towards Sanjiangkou
Location

Pingshan Station (Chinese: 屏山站; pinyin: Píngshān zhàn; Fuzhounese: [piŋ˥˥ laŋ˥˥]) is a metro station of Line 1 of the Fuzhou Metro. It is located on the intersection of Guping Road, Qiantang Lane and Yeshan Road in Gulou District, Fuzhou, Fujian, China. It started operation on January 6, 2017.

== Station layout ==
G
Street level
Exits
B1

Concourse
Customer Service, Automatic Ticketing Machines
B2

Platforms

Platform 1
← Line 1 towards Xiangfeng (Shudou)
Island platform, doors will open on the left
Platform 2
Line 1 towards Sanjiangkou (Dongjiekou)→

== Exits ==
Exit number	Exit location
Exit B	Northwest of station
Exit D	Southeast of station
