= Shudou station =

Fuzhou Metro station

Shudou 树兜
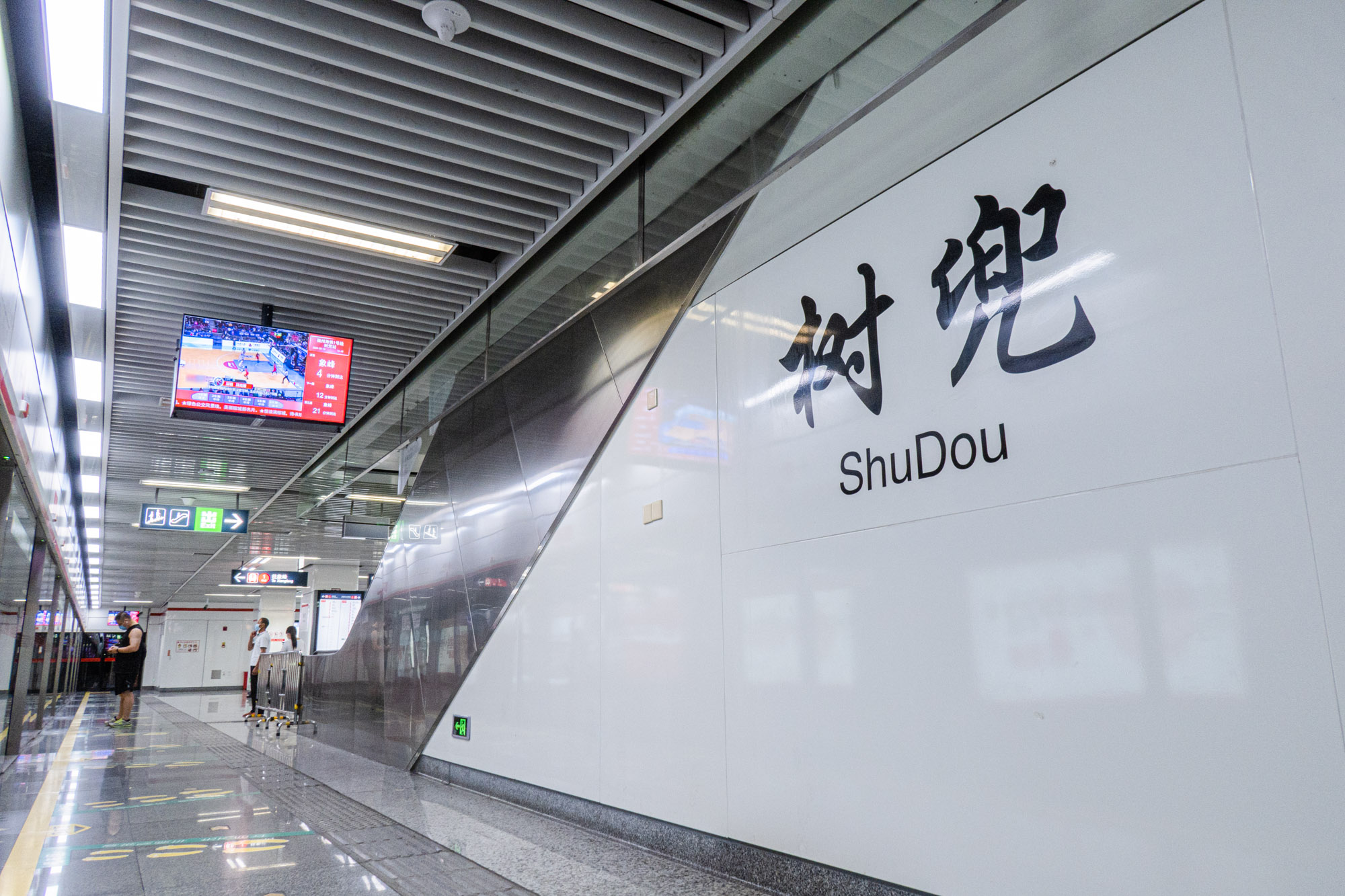

General information
- Location: Gulou District, Fuzhou, Fujian; China
- Coordinates: 26.1055170°N 119.3022234°E
- Operator: Fuzhou Metro Co., Ltd.
- Line: Line 1
- Platforms: 2

Construction
- Structure type: Underground

History
- Opened: 6 January 2017

Services
Preceding station	Fuzhou Metro	Following station
Doumen towards Xiangfeng	Line 1	Pingshan towards Sanjiangkou
Location

Shudou Station (Chinese: 树兜站; pinyin: Shùdōu zhàn; Fuzhounese: [tsʰiu˥˥ lau˥˥]) is a metro station of Line 1 of the Fuzhou Metro. It is located on the intersection of Hualin Road and Wusi Road in Gulou District, Fuzhou, Fujian, China. It started operation on January 6, 2017.

== Station layout ==
G
Street level
Exits
B1

Concourse
Customer Service, Automatic Ticketing Machines
B2

Platforms

Platform 1
← Line 1 towards Xiangfeng (Doumen)
Island platform, doors will open on the left
Platform 2
Line 1 towards Sanjiangkou (Pingshan)→

== Exits ==
Exit number	Exit location
Exit B	Northwest of station
Exit C	Southwest of station
Exit D	Southeast of station
