= Line 1 (Fuzhou Metro) =

Metro line in Fuzhou, Fujian, China

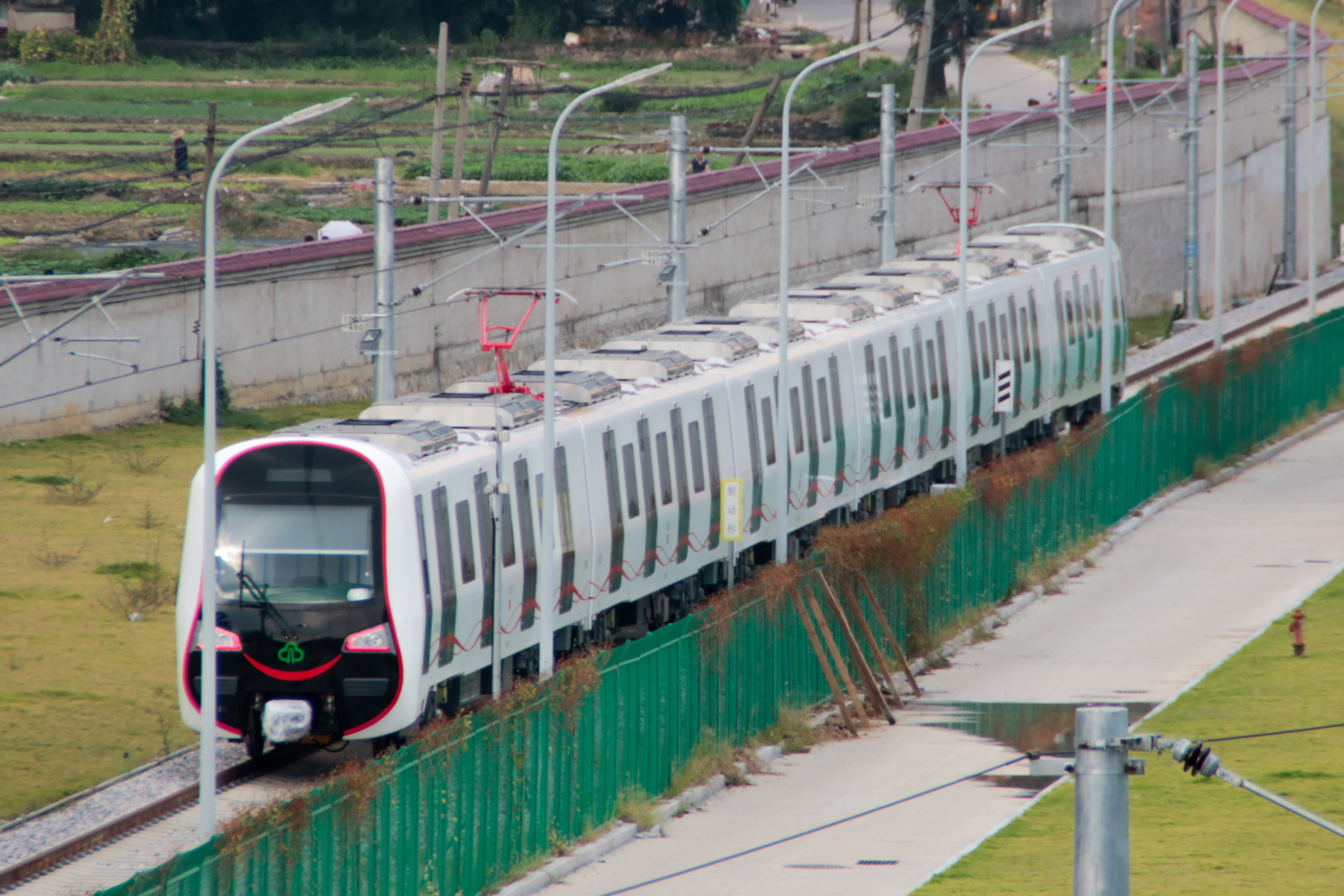

Overview
- Status: In Operation
- Owner: City of Fuzhou
- Locale: Fuzhou, Fujian, China
- Termini: Xiangfeng; Sanjiangkou
- Stations: 25
- Website: http://www.fzmtr.com

Service
- Type: Rapid transit
- System: Fuzhou Metro
- Operator(s): Fuzhou Metro Co., Ltd.
- Depot(s): Xindian Depot, Qingliangshan Depot
- Rolling stock: 28 cars, type B

History
- Opened: May 18, 2016; 9 years ago

Technical
- Line length: 29.84 km (18.5 mi)
- Character: Underground
- Track gauge: 1,435 mm (4 ft 8 1/2 in)
- Electrification: 1500 V DC overhead wires
- Operating speed: 80 km/h (50 mph)
Route map

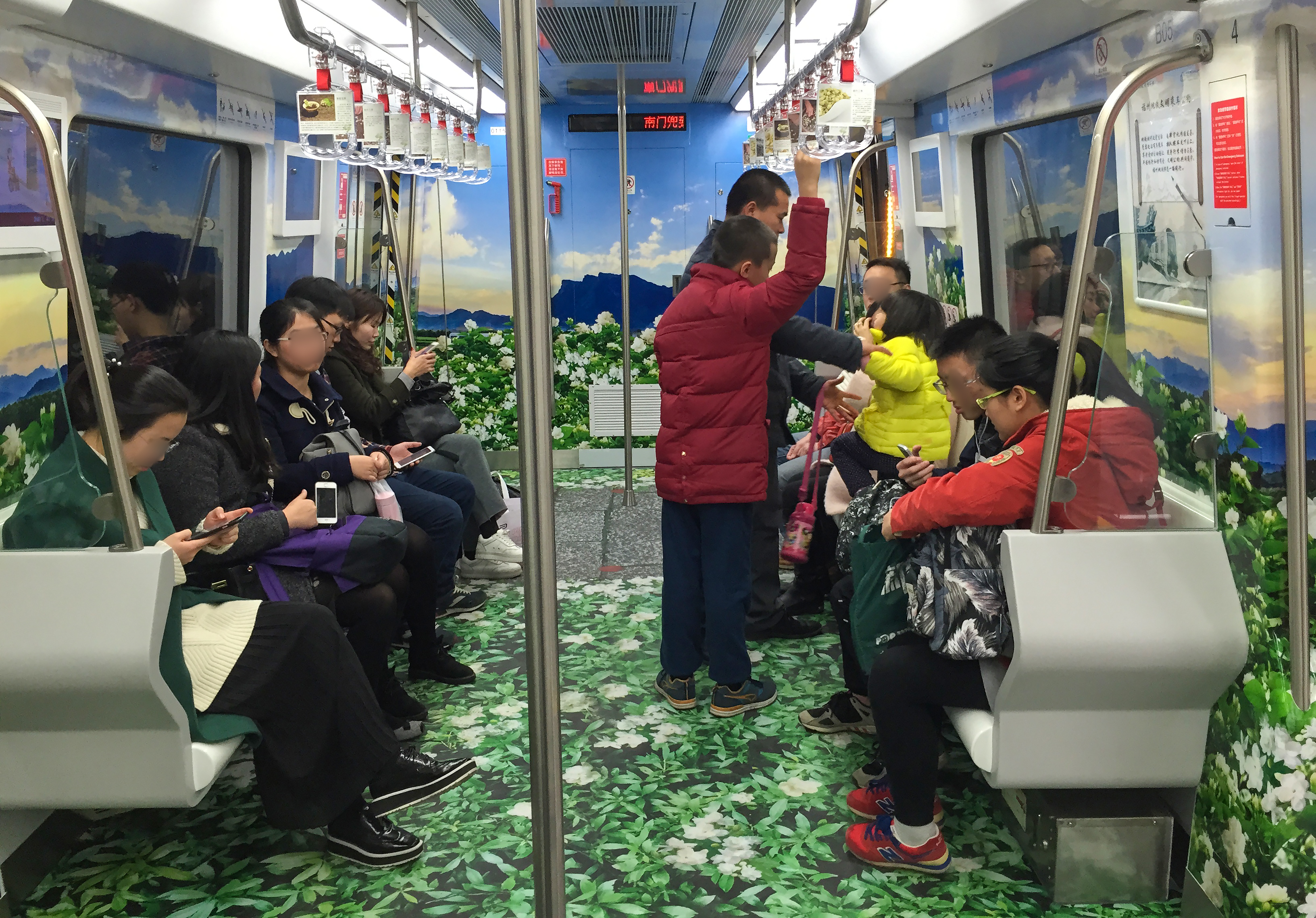
Car 01151 with jasmine decorations

Line 1 of the Fuzhou Metro (simplified Chinese: 福州地铁1号线; traditional Chinese: 福州地鐵1號線; pinyin: Fúzhōu Dìtiě Yī Hào Xiàn) is a north-south line of the Fuzhou Metro network in Fuzhou, Fujian Province, China. This line is the first operating metro line in the Fuzhou Metro system, inaugurated on May 18, 2016. By June 2016, the south section, running from Sanchajie to Fuzhou South, is in operation. The north section opened on 6 January 2017. This line is colored red on system maps.

The construction of Line 1 is divided into two phases. The first phase runs from Xiangfeng to Fuzhou South. This part of Line 1 is 24.89 km in length and has 21 stations. The second phase runs from Fuzhou South to Sanjiangkou with 4 stations. This part is 4.921 km long.

== Service Schedule ==
Segment	Commencement	Length	Station(s)	Name
Sanchajie — Fuzhou South Railway Station	18 May 2016	9.76 km (6.06 mi)	9	Phase 1 (southern section)
Xiangfeng — Shangteng	6 January 2017	15.13 km (9.40 mi)	12	Phase 1 (northern section)
Anping — Sanjiangkou	27 December 2020	4.921 km (3.06 mi)	4	Phase 2

== Route ==
Line 1 is a metro rail line running from north to south in Fuzhou metropolitan area. It operates between Xiangfeng Station and Sanjiangkou Station, running through Fuzhou Railway Station, Dongjiekou Station, Nanmendou Station, Sanchajie Station, Chengmen Station, and Fuzhou South Railway Station, all of which are cities' major transportation junctions and proposed transfer stations with other subway lines.

== Stations ==

Station name		Connections	Distance km		Jurisdiction
English	Chinese	Connections	Distance km		Jurisdiction
Xiangfeng	象峰		0.00	0.00	Jin'an
Xiushan	秀山		1.51	1.51	Jin'an
Luohanshan	罗汉山		0.97	2.48	Jin'an
Fuzhou Railway Station	福州火车站	Binhai Express FZS	1.65	4.13	Jin'an
Doumen	斗门		1.20	5.33	Jin'an
Shudou	树兜		0.80	6.13	Gulou
Pingshan	屏山		1.32	7.45	Gulou
Dongjiekou	东街口	4	1.15	8.60	Gulou
Nanmendou	南门兜	2	1.00	9.60	Gulou
Chating	茶亭		0.95	10.55	Gulou/Taijiang
Dadao	达道		1.50	12.05	Taijiang
Shangteng	上藤		1.73	13.78	Cangshan
Sanchajie	三叉街	Binhai Express	1.05	14.83	Cangshan
Baihuting	白湖亭		1.43	16.26	Cangshan
Huluzhen	葫芦阵		1.30	17.56	Cangshan
Huangshan	黄山		0.97	18.53	Cangshan
Paixia	排下		1.05	19.58	Cangshan
Chengmen	城门	4	1.00	20.58	Cangshan
Sanjiaocheng	三角埕		1.00	21.58	Cangshan
Lulei	胪雷		1.47	23.05	Cangshan
Fuzhou South	福州火车南站	5 FYS	1.00	24.05	Cangshan
Anping	安平				Cangshan
Liangcuo	梁厝	6			Cangshan
Xiayang	下洋	6			Cangshan
Sanjiangkou	三江口				Cangshan

== Operating hours ==
During the first few months of operation, only the south section of Line 1 was in operation. The hours of operation during that time were from 7:00 to 20:20.

After the north section of the line opened, the hours of operation were extended. Nowadays, Line 1 begins operations at 6:30 and ends operations at 23:00.

== Rolling stock ==
Type	Time of manufacturing	Series	Sets	Assembly	Notes
Type B	2014 - 2015	Fulong B2	28	Tc+Mp+M+M+Mp+Tc	Designed by Tangshan Railway Vehicle, Manufactured by CNR Quanzhou.

== See also ==
- List of metro systems
