= Doumen station (Fuzhou Metro) =

Metro station in Fuzhou, China

Doumen 斗门
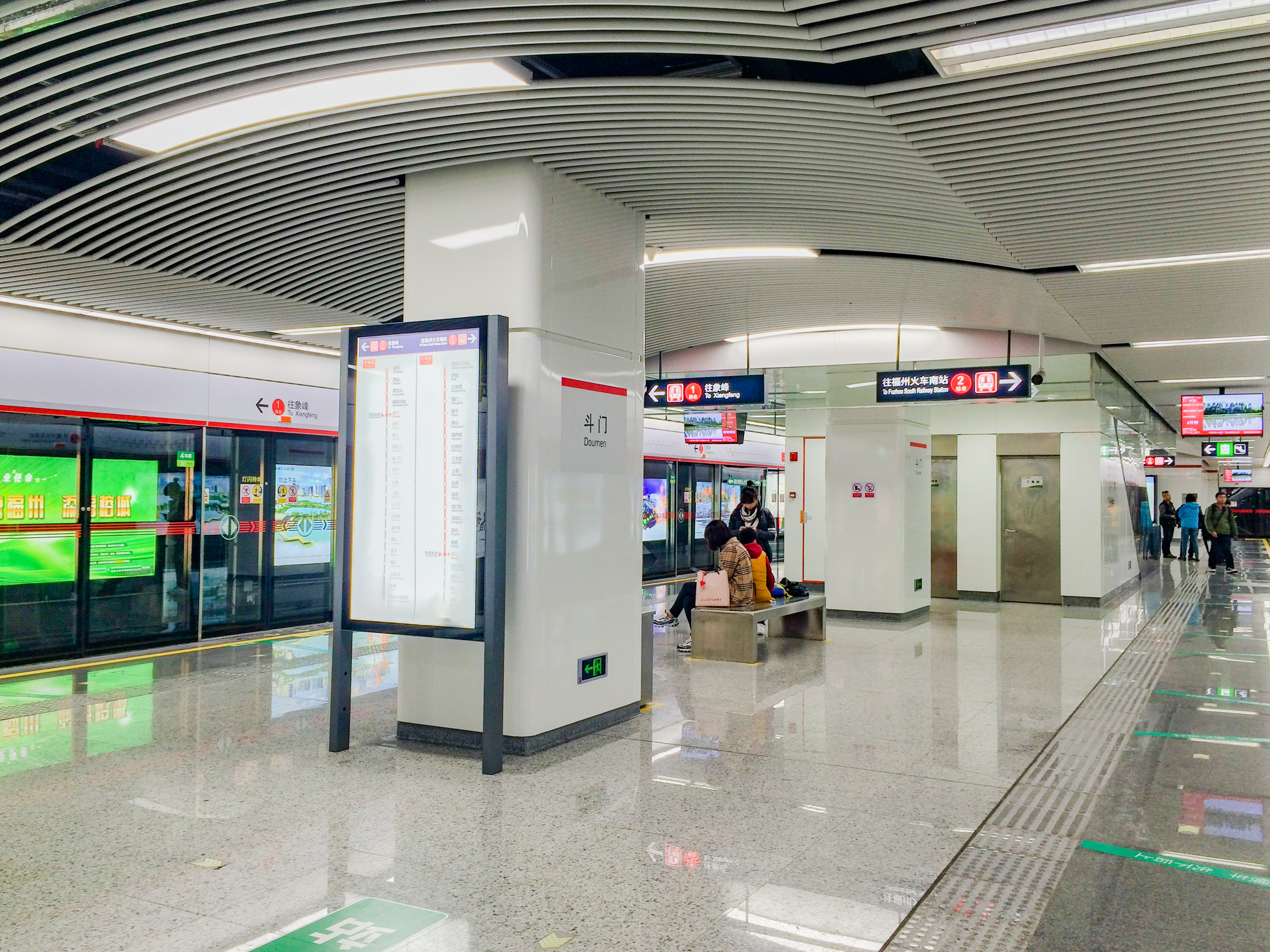

General information
- Location: Jin'an District, Fuzhou, Fujian; China
- Coordinates: 26.1070185°N 119.3085792°E
- Operator: Fuzhou Metro Co., Ltd.
- Line: Line 1
- Platforms: 2

Construction
- Structure type: Underground

History
- Opened: 6 January 2017

Services
Preceding station	Fuzhou Metro	Following station
Fuzhou Railway Station towards Xiangfeng	Line 1	Shudou towards Sanjiangkou
Location

Doumen Station (Chinese: 斗门站; pinyin: Dǒumén zhàn; Fuzhounese: [tɑu˨˩ muoŋ˥˧]) is a metro station of Line 1 of the Fuzhou Metro. It is located on the intersection of Hualin Road and Xiangbin Road in Jin'an District, Fuzhou, Fujian, China. It started operation on January 6, 2017.
