= Xiushan station =

Metro station in Fuzhou, China

Xiushan 秀山
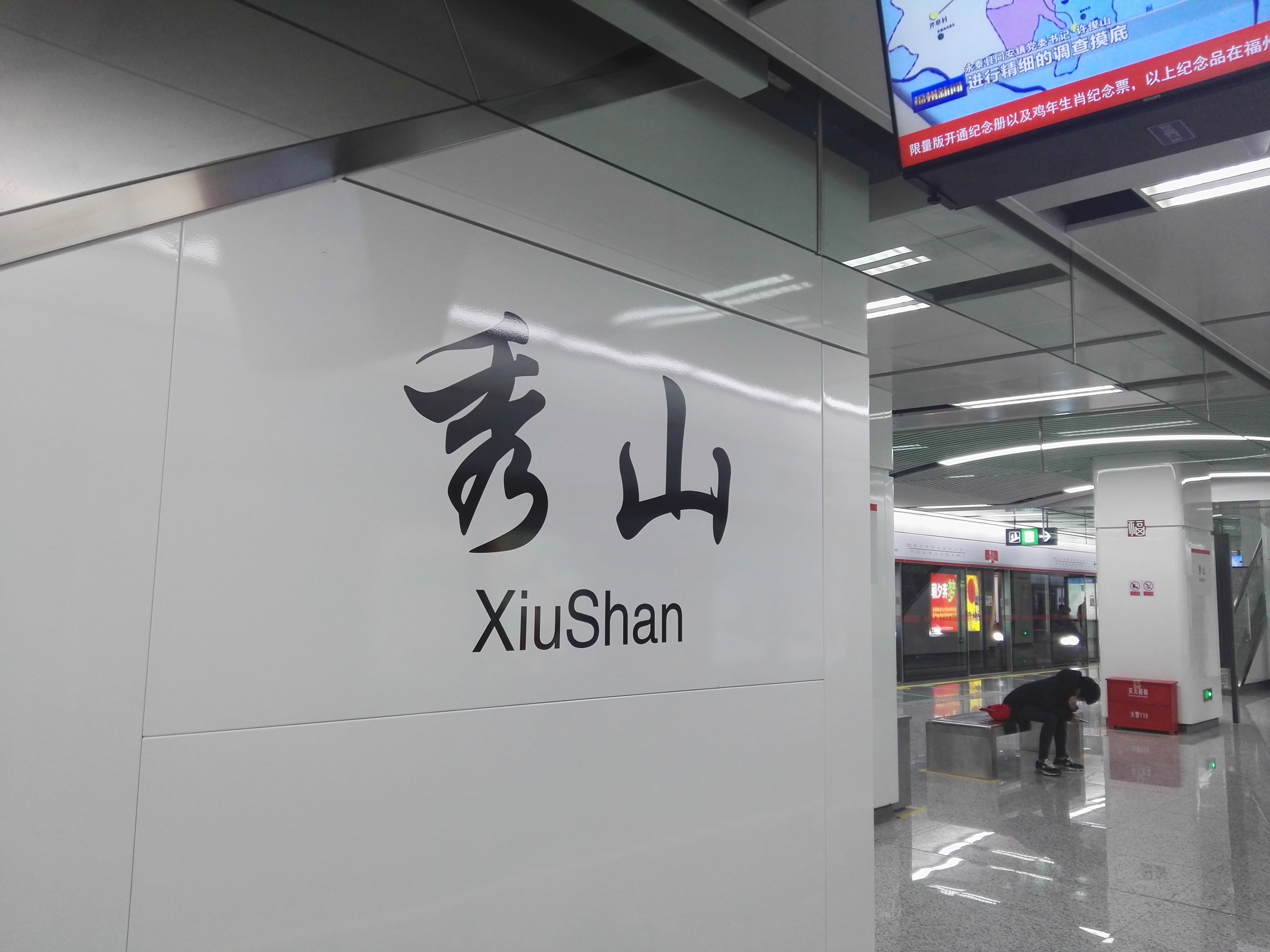

General information
- Location: Jin'an District, Fuzhou, Fujian; China
- Coordinates: 26.1372366°N 119.3165217°E
- Operator: Fuzhou Metro Co., Ltd.
- Line: Line 1
- Platforms: 2

Construction
- Structure type: Underground

History
- Opened: 6 January 2017

Services
Preceding station	Fuzhou Metro	Following station
Xiangfeng Terminus	Line 1	Luohanshan towards Sanjiangkou
Location

Xiushan Station (Chinese: 秀山站; pinyin: Xìushān zhàn; Fuzhounese: [seu˥ laŋ˥]) is a metro station of Line 1 of the Fuzhou Metro. It is located on the intersection of Xiufeng Road and Shanqian South Road in Jin'an District, Fuzhou, Fujian, China. It started operation on January 6, 2017.
