= Nantai Island =

River island in Fuzhou, Fujian, China

Native name: 南台岛
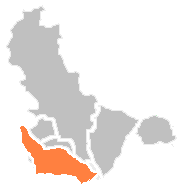
- Nantai Island in central Fuzhou
- Interactive map of Nantai Island

Geography
- Coordinates: 26°02′13″N 119°19′44″E
- Area: 118.2 km^{2} (45.6 sq mi)
- Coastline: 66 km (41 mi)
- Highest point: Gaogai Mountain (高盖山)

Administration
- People's Republic of China
- Province: Fujian
- Prefecture-level city: Fuzhou
- District: Cangshan

Nantai (simplified Chinese: 南台岛; traditional Chinese: 南台島; pinyin: Nántái Dǎo) is the largest island in the Min River of Fujian. It is located in the center of the Fuzhou Plain, surrounded by the "north harbor" of the Min (闽江北港) (Note: Alternatively known as the Nantai River (Chinese: 南台江; pinyin: Nántái Jiāng), abbreviated "Tai River" (台江). Hence the island's name, Nantai, meaning "south of the Tai [River]".) and the Wulong River, or "south harbor" of the Min. It has the nickname "Island of Chinese snowballs and jade" (琼花玉岛).

Nantai Island is wholly located in and forms the majority of Cangshan District, Fuzhou.

== Geology ==
Around or before the Late Pleistocene, Nantai was only a rocky islet in the mouth of the Min River. It mostly comprised the present-day Gaogai Mountain (高盖山), Hama Mountain (虾蟆山; 'toad mountain'), and Yantai Mountain (烟台山), amounting to a land area of less than 30 km^{2} (12 sq mi). The island gradually expanded to over 100 km^{2} (39 sq mi) in the modern era, leading to the formation of Heidong Mountain (鬼洞山), Miaofeng Mountain (妙峰山), Guilong Mountain (圭龙山), and Qingyuan Peak (清源顶). The island continues to expand toward the northwest and southeast.

== Geography ==
Nantai has an area of 118.2 km^{2} (45.6 sq mi), and is shaped like a rotated "S" along a southeast-northwest axis. It is oblong, with a comparatively short north-south length and long east-west span. The highest point on the island is Gaoshan Mountain (高盖山) at 202.6 m (665 ft), though most of the island is below 150 m (490 ft).
