= Cangshan, Fuzhou =

District in Fuzhou, Fujian, China

Cangshan 仓山区
- District
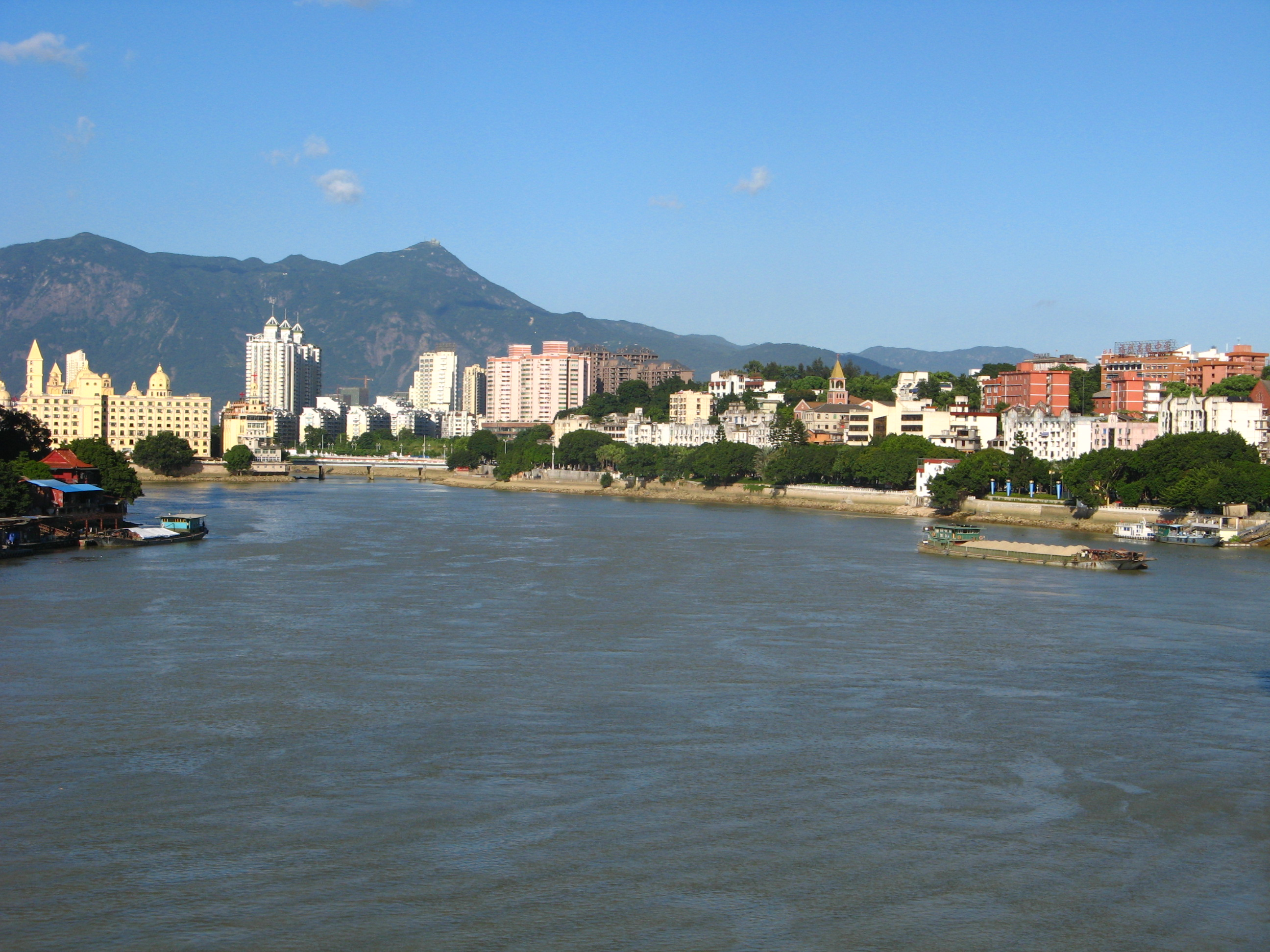
- Min River side of Cangshan

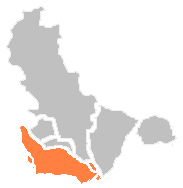
- Location in Fuzhou

- Location in Fujian
- Coordinates: 26°03′18″N 119°18′58″E
- Country: People's Republic of China
- Province: Fujian
- Prefecture-level city: Fuzhou

Area
  - Total: 139 km^{2} (54 sq mi)

Population (2020)
  - Total: 1,142,991
  - Density: 8,220/km^{2} (21,300/sq mi)
- Time zone: UTC+8 (China Standard)
- Postal code: 350007
- Area code: 0591
- GDP (2020): CN¥ 90.22 billion
- Website: cs.fuzhou.gov.cn

Cangshan District (simplified Chinese: 仓山区; traditional Chinese: 倉山區; pinyin: Cāngshān Qū, Fuzhou dialect: Chŏng-săng) is one of six urban districts of the prefecture-level city of Fuzhou, Fujian, China.

== History ==
Cangshan District was formerly known as Guatengshan (lit. 'Melon Vine Mountain'), also known as "Tengshan" (lit. 'Vine Mountain'), with a watchtower at the top of the mountain. Therefore, it was also called the Yan Tai Mountain (lit. 'Smoke Platform Mountain'), named after the Zhongzhou barbette (lit. 'Zhongzhou Cannon Platform'). Because a salt warehouse was built there in Ming dynasty, the place was also called Cangqianshan (lit. 'the mountain before the warehouse'), abbreviated to Cangshan, which is where the modern name comes from.

The Treaty of Nanking in 1842 listed Fuzhou (Fuchow) as one of the Five Ports of Treaty, which made Cangshan District become the historic district for consulates. In 1844–1903, there built consulates of the United Kingdom, the United States of America, France, Russia, Japan, the Netherlands, Portugal, Spain, etc. At the same time, many Christian churches, schools, hospitals, newspaper offices, western firms were built there. Because of this history, there still exist some Gothic-style buildings and Romanesque-style buildings today, which become the iconic style of Cangshan District. Since the year 2005, because of the "transformation of the old district" project, some characteristic buildings were torn down and rebuilt, which triggered some social opposition.

== Geography ==
Cangshan District is located in the south part of downtown Fuzhou, including entire Nantai Island, and a few sand islands on the Min River. Cangshan District is next to Gulou District, Taijiang District, Jin'an District, Mawei District, Changle District and Minhou County. The area of Cangshan District is about 142 square kilometres.

Cangshan District is surrounded by the Min River main branch (or north branch) and the Wulong River (the Min River south branch). The Min River (main branch) and Wulong River converge on Mawei District and ultimately flows to the Taiwan Strait.

There are various mountains and hills in Cangshan District, e.g. Gaogai Mountain, Chang'an Mountain, Yantai Mountain, etc. In the centre of the former urban area (i.e. Cangshan proper), there were full of plum blossoms. As a result, the road is known as the Meiwu Road (lit. 'plum blossom hollow road'). People used to visit there annually to enjoy the plum blossoms, which was an important annual event.

== See also ==
- Nantai Island
