= Xiangfeng station =

Metro station in Fuzhou, China

Xiangfeng 象峰
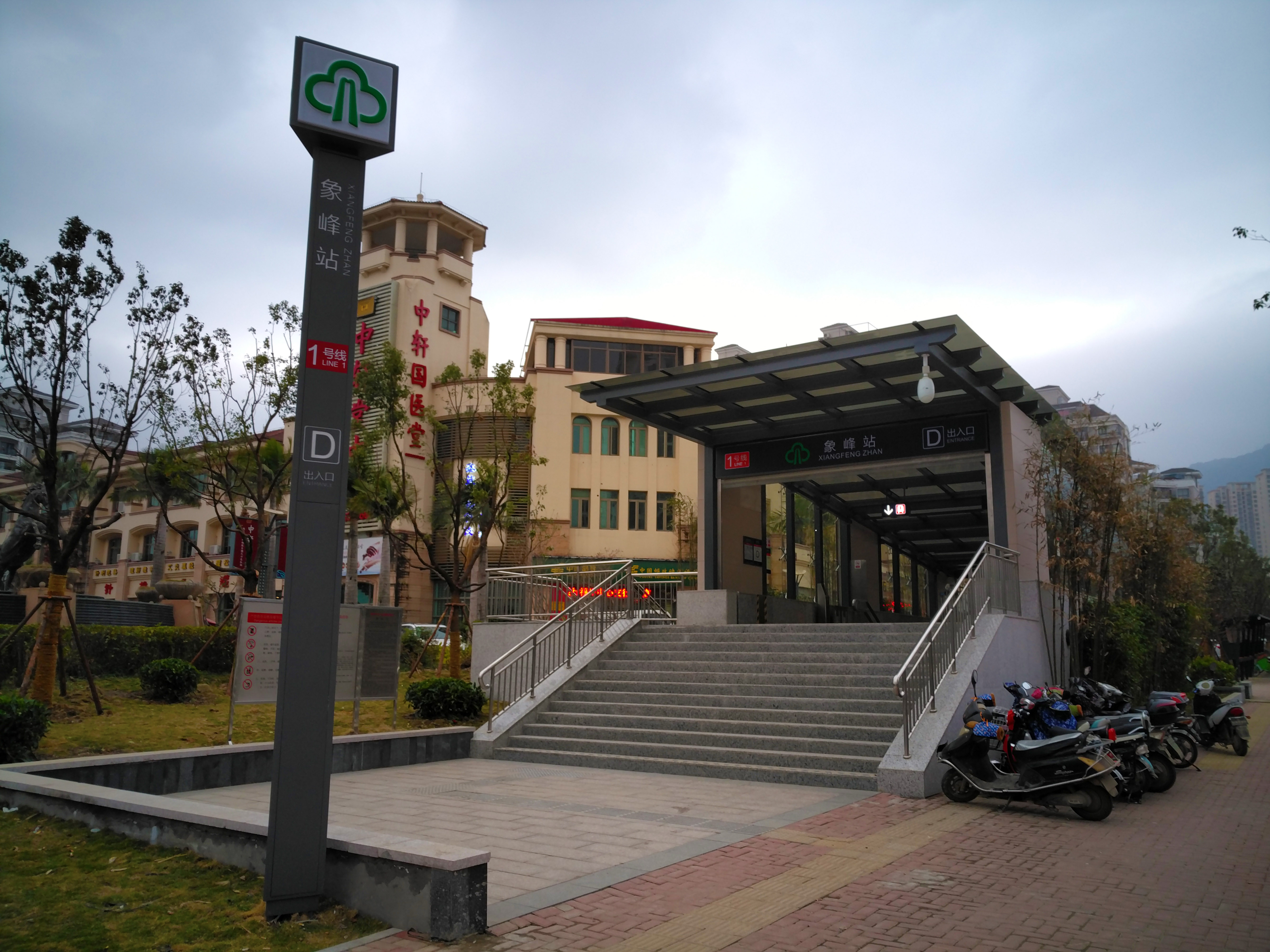

General information
- Location: Jin'an District, Fuzhou, Fujian; China
- Coordinates: 26.1452618°N 119.3239371°E
- Operator: Fuzhou Metro Co., Ltd.
- Line: Line 1
- Platforms: 2

Construction
- Structure type: Underground

History
- Opened: 6 January 2017

Services
Preceding station	Fuzhou Metro	Following station
Terminus	Line 1	Xiushan towards Sanjiangkou
Location

Xiangfeng Station (Chinese: 象峰站; pinyin: Xiàngfēng zhàn; Fuzhounese: [t͡sʰuɔŋ˥˥ huŋ˥˥]) is a metro station of Line 1 of the Fuzhou Metro. It is located on Xiufeng Road and Manyang Road intersection in Jin'an District, Fuzhou, Fujian, China. The station is also a northern terminus of Line 1. It started operation on January 6, 2017.
