= Ngan Lung Restaurant =

Hong Kong restaurant chain

Ngan Lung Catering (Holdings) Ltd.
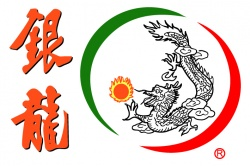
- Ngan Lung Restaurant Logo
- Company type: Private
- Industry: Restaurants
- Genre: Cha chaan teng
- Founded: 1963; 63 years ago
- Headquarters: Kowloon Walled City, Kowloon, Hong Kong
- Area served: Hong Kong, Zhuhai (formerly)
- Key people: Tang Bing-hung, Chairman
- Products: Chinese food • Hong Kong-style Western cuisine
- Number of employees: 850 (2016)
- Website: nganlung.com/index.html

Ngan Lung Catering (Holdings) Limited (Chinese: 銀龍飲食集團有限公司) is a cha chaan teng restaurant chain founded by Lau Choi Lung in 1963 in Hong Kong. The chain currently has 18 locations, primarily serving Kowloon and the New Territories. It also operates three restaurants on Hong Kong Island. Food items offered at each outlet varies, although most of the available food choices are standard, and are reminiscent of Hong Kong traditional cha chaan teng and bing sutt food culture.

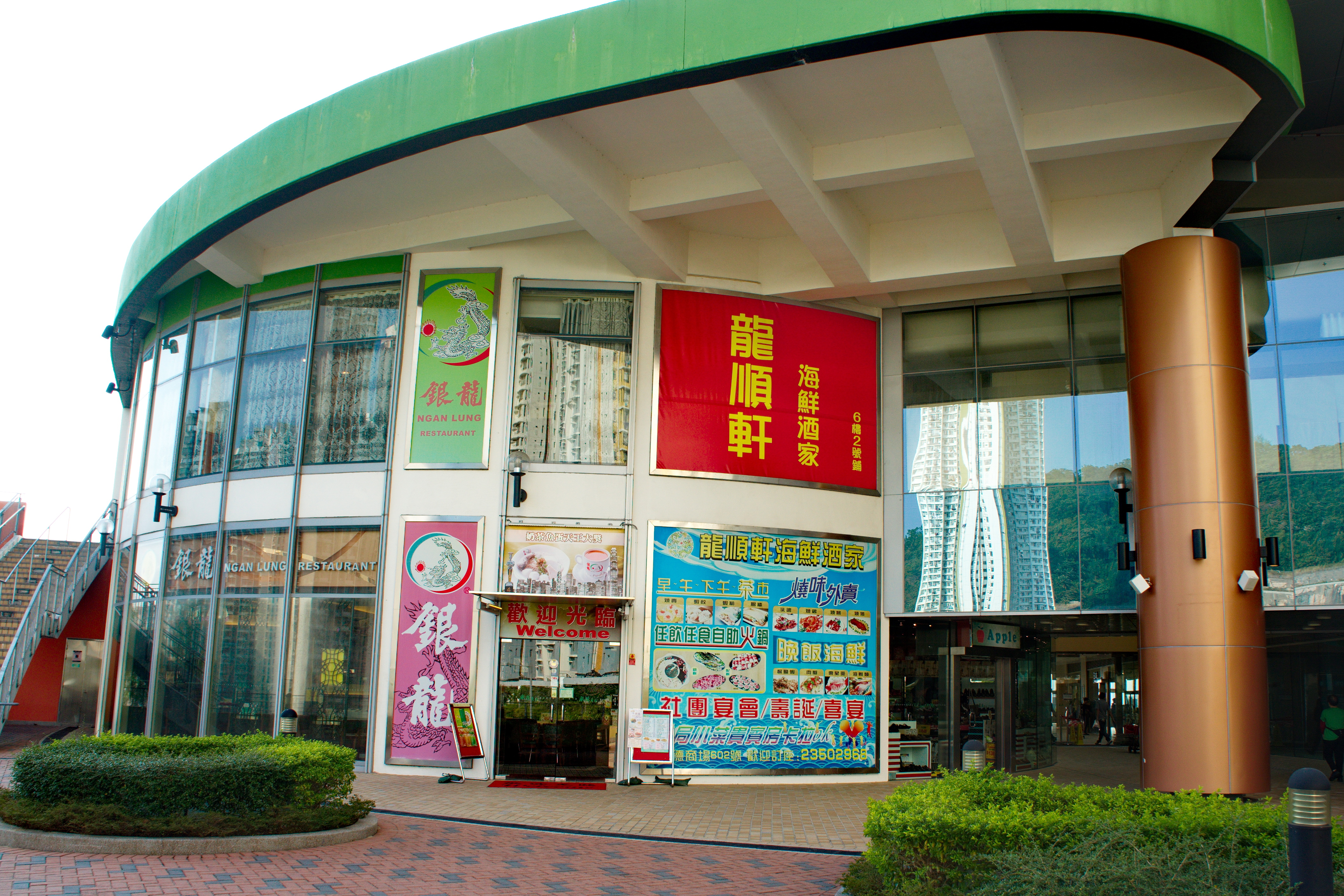
Ngan Lung Restaurant at Choi Tak Shopping Centre.

== History ==
Ngan Lung Restaurant was founded in 1963 by street vendor Tang Bing-hung as a bing sutt, which were restaurants that offered inexpensive Hong Kong-style Western cuisine. The bing sutt was located in Tung Tau Tsuen. Due to the low standard of living in the area at the time, the inexpensive food offered at the bing sutt was very popular, and the business experienced rapid growth. However, the government planned to redevelop Tung Tau Tsuen, and in 1984 the business moved to Lok Fu, Kowloon. It was located near Kowloon Walled City, an area which was rife with crime at the time. Due to its proximity to the area, as well as various high-profile actors acting as villains in television dramas frequenting the restaurant, Ngan Lung gradually received more public exposure. As the business grew bigger, its owners started focusing on how to expand it elsewhere. In the 1990s, Ngan Lung started setting up restaurants in Tsuen Wan, an area where it continues to maintain a heavy presence with 8 outlets.

The business continued expanding at the turn of the century, and as of 2016, the restaurant chain operates 18 outlets. In addition to operating restaurants, the chain also operates two bakeries in Kowloon.

== Sai Yeung Choi Branch controversy ==
On January 24, 2013, the chain's branch on Sai Yeung Choi Street, Mong Kok announced that it would cease operations after the end of the Lunar New Year celebrations, due to a rent increase from 900,000 to 2,000,000 Hong Kong dollars. This outlet became the first branch to cease operations since the relocation of the original bing sutt, and caused considerable public uproar. With stories of shops closing down due to increasing rent almost ubiquitous in Hong Kong, the closing down of this restaurant only served to fuel public anger. Ngan Lung has decided to open another branch on Carnarvon Road, Tsim Sha Tsui.
