= Capital Cafe =

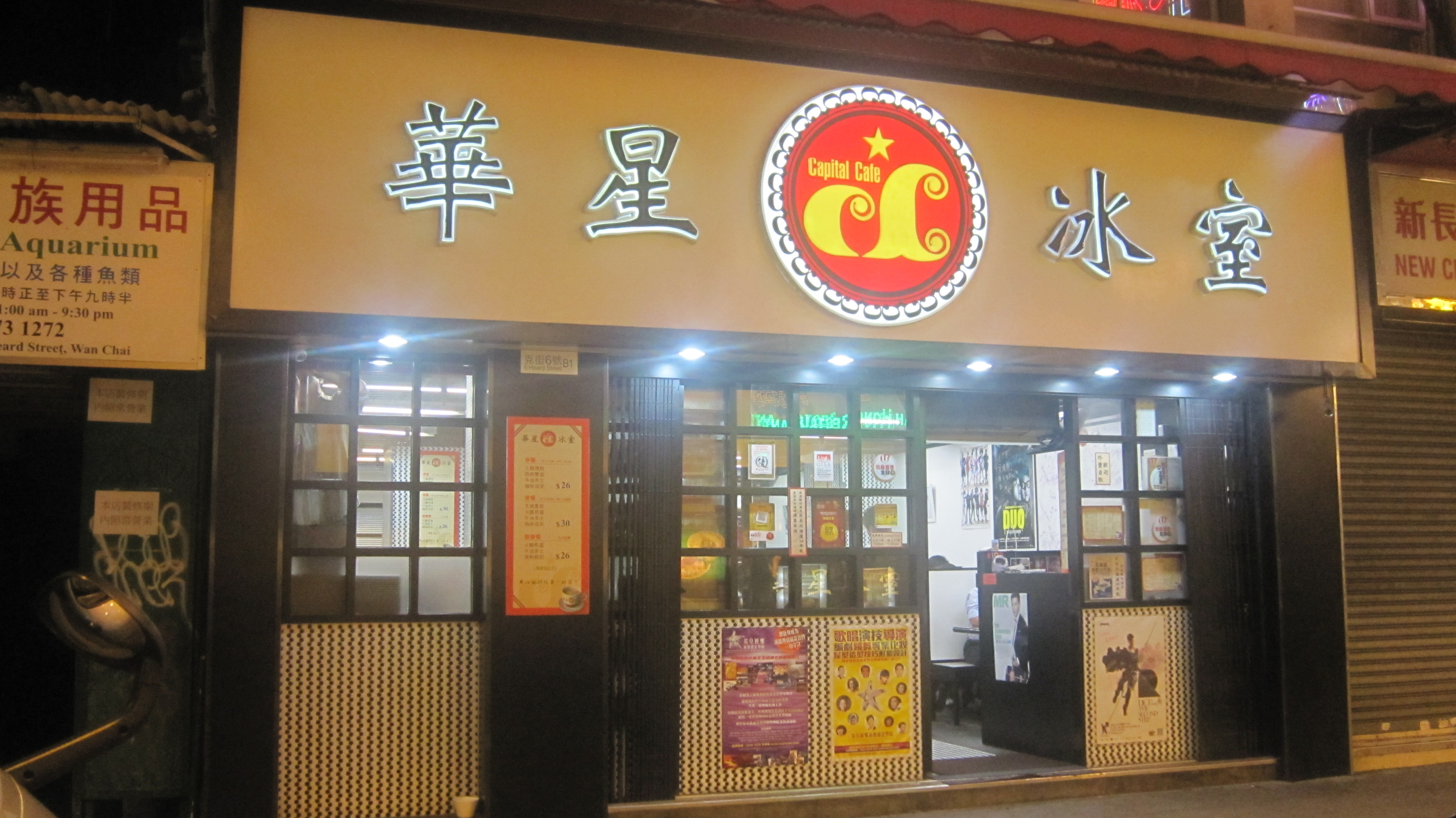
- Capital Cafe in Wan Chai
- Interactive map of Capital Cafe

Restaurant information
- Established: 2010
- Owner: Swadiq Khan
- Food type: Bing sutt
- Location: 克街6號廣生行大廈地下 B1號舖, Wan Chai, Hong Kong, Hong Kong, China
- Coordinates: 22.27765°N 114.17723°E
- Other locations: yes

Capital Cafe, better known as Wah Sing Bing Sutt (and as Chrisly Cafe in Macau), is a traditional café in Hong Kong. Bing suits have been very popular in Hong Kong since the 1950s. It mainly sold Western drinks and light meals in the Hong Kong style, such as milk tea, red bean ice, French toast, and instant noodles.

== History ==
Capital Cafe was first opened in 2010 in Wan Chai to give a salute to the former Capital Artists Music Limited, which was a record company in the 1970s and 1980s. The second branch store is located in Shau Kei Wan since August 2011 and a third one was then set up in Mong Kok in March 2012. In January 2014, the first non-local branch store was opened in Macau.

Capital Cafe was founded by Swadiq Khan who previously worked for Capital Artists Music Limited. The café was set to memorize the splendid years of Capital Artists Music Limited. The other shareholders are Eddie Pang and Edmond Leung, who are all singers in Hong Kong? Since all of the owners are from the entertainment business, the café was widely reported in newspapers and magazines once it was set up.

In 2011, Swadiq Khan started a partnership with capitalists from the mainland, and two branch stores were started in Guangzhou, but soon withdrew in the next year. The reason behind the breakup was disagreements between Khan and his partners from the mainland. Khan claimed that they had disputes in the matter of food quality and accommodations provided to the workers. After failing to make his partners withdraw their shares, Khan decided to withdraw his shares.

== Characteristics ==
Scrambled eggs and milk tea are famous dishes in Capital Café. The scrambled eggs are well known because 3.6 Hokkaido milk and butter are added while cooking. There is also a dish called the "Principal's Toast", which is made with toasted bread covered with cheese and black truffle. It is named as such because this kind of toast is tailor-made for the singer Alan Tam, whose nickname is "Principal".

It is often said that the scrambled eggs in Capital Café are comparable to those in another well-known “cha chaan teng”, Australia Dairy Company. A few of the experienced chefs had worked in the Australian Dairy Company for years.

The interior design of Capital Cafe is one of its unique characteristics. The ceiling fans, flooring tiles, wooden chairs, and tables, are all in the style of 1970s Hong Kong. Moreover, since this cafe is founded by a former worker of Capital Artists Music Limited, there are many famous Hong Kong stars' posters posted inside the cafe. Capital Cafe has also enshrined a lot of precious old records and concert posters. As Capital Cafe is frequently visited by many pop stars, there is also a blackboard hung on the wall for the pop stars to sign on.

== Recent news ==
In July 2014, Capital Cafe's owner Swadiq Khan became the owner of YFCMD of the Hong Kong First Division Football League. The logo of Capital Cafe was printed on the team player's training jerseys.

In October 2014, Capital Cafe joined the campaign Live in Levi's launched by Levi's Hong Kong. The campaign aims at integrating Levi's into the daily life of customers. The two companies worked collaboratively to make the Wan Chai branch become a pop-up store. The whole store has been embellished with denim. The employees' uniforms have been changed to Levi's jeans, aprons, and T-shirts. The chairs of the restaurants have also been covered by denim. In addition, Capital Cafe exclusively introduced a new dish named Levi's Toast, using tomato and cheese to represent the color of the brand's logo. This combines the image of Levi's with the popular dish of Capital Cafe.
