= Sizzle =

Sizzle may refer to:

== People ==
- Young Sizzle, an American rapper

== Arts, entertainment, and media ==
- Sizzle (1981 film), a 1981 American TV movie
- Sizzle (2008 film), a feature documentary about global warming
- Sizzle (album), an album by Sam Rivers
- Sizzle (Transformers), the name of some Transformers series characters
- Frizzle Sizzle, a Dutch teenage girl group of the 1980s

== Other uses ==
- Sizzle (selector engine), an open source selector engine for the JavaScript library jQuery
- "All sizzle and no steak", an idiom referring to a thing or person which fails to measure up to its description or advanced promotion
- Cincinnati Sizzle, an American football team
- Sizzle cymbal, a cymbal to which rivets, chains or other rattles have been added to modify the sound

== See also ==
- Sizzler (disambiguation)
- Taylor Swift, referred to affectionately by some as "T-Swizzle"
