= Yuanyang =

Yuanyang may refer to:

- Mandarin duck, also known as yuanyang (鸳鸯)
- Yuenyeung (鴛鴦), a popular beverage in Hong Kong, named after the mandarin duck
- Yuanyang County, Henan (原阳县)
- Yuanyang County, Yunnan (元阳县), well known for its spectacular rice-paddy terracing
- Yuanyang (character), in the Chinese novel Dream of the Red Chamber

== See also ==
- Yuan Yang (disambiguation)
