= Cha chaan teng =

Type of Cantonese restaurant

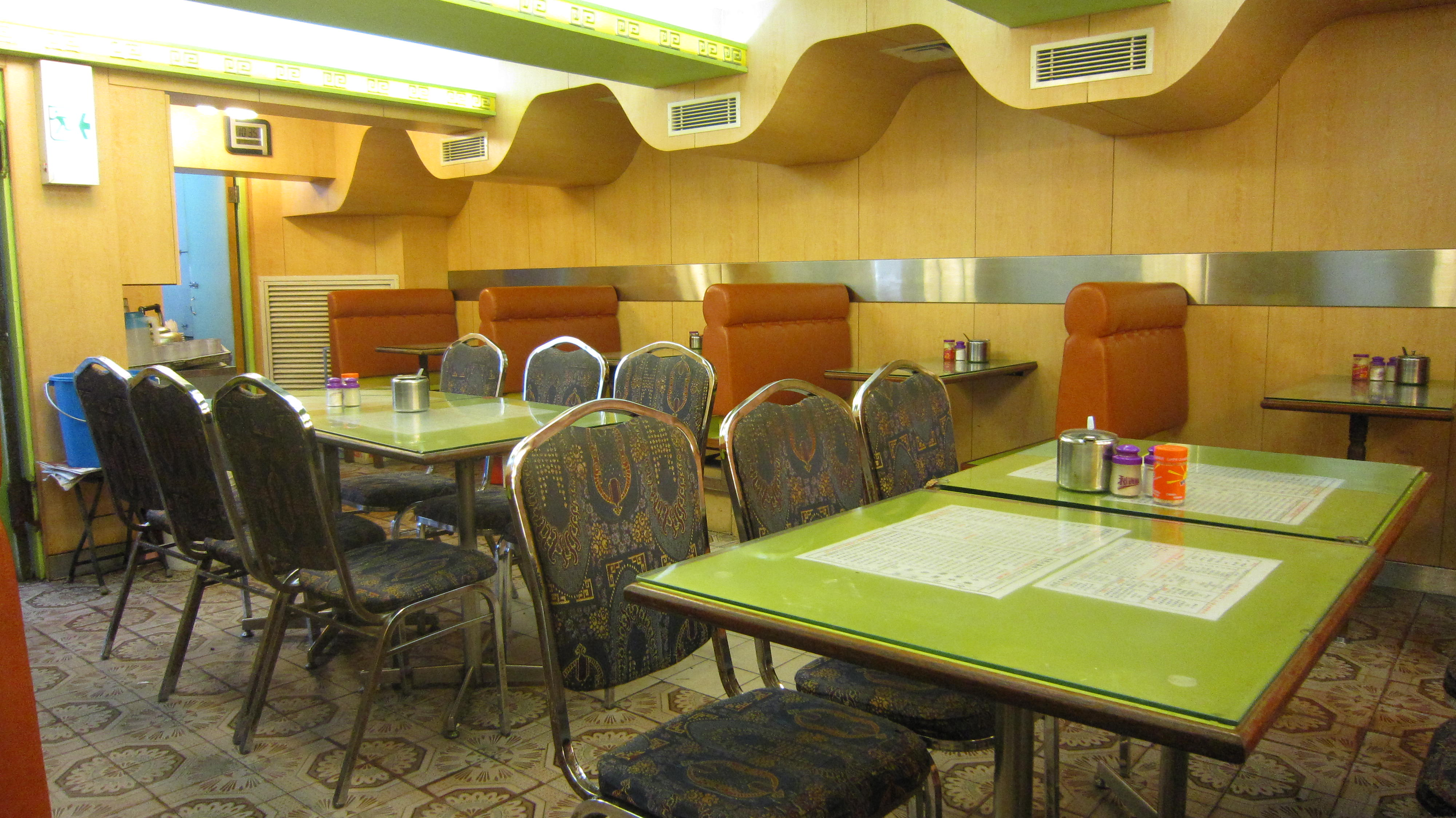
- Traditional Chinese: 茶餐廳
- Simplified Chinese: 茶餐厅
- Jyutping: caa4-caan1-teng1
- Literal meaning: "tea restaurant"
Transcriptions
Standard Mandarin
- Hanyu Pinyin: chácāntīng
Yue: Cantonese
- Yale Romanization: chàah chāan tēng
- Jyutping: caa4-caan1-teng1
- IPA: [tsʰa˩ tsʰan˥ tʰɛŋ˥]
Southern Min
- Hokkien POJ: tê-chhan-thiaⁿ

Cha chaan teng (Chinese: 茶餐廳; Cantonese Yale: chàhchāantēng; lit. 'tea restaurant'), often called a Hong Kong-style cafe or diner in English, is a type of restaurant that originated in Hong Kong. Cha chaan tengs are commonly found in Hong Kong, Macau, and parts of Guangdong. Due to the waves of mass migrations from Hong Kong in the 1980s, they are now established in major Chinese communities in Western countries such as Australia, Canada, the United Kingdom, and the United States. Likened to a greasy spoon cafe or an American diner, cha chaan tengs are known for eclectic and affordable menus, which include dishes from Hong Kong cuisine and Hong Kong-style Western cuisine.

Popular cha chaan teng dishes include fried eggs, pastry chicken pies, and baked pork chop rice with ketchup as an ingredient. Guests frequently order black coffee or black tea with canned milk. The setting is casual; Hong Kong construction workers as well as sharp-suited bankers frequent cha chaan tengs.

== History ==
Since the 1850s, Western cuisine in Hong Kong had been available only in full-service restaurants. This privilege was limited for the upper class, and financially out of reach for most working-class locals. In the 1920s, dining in a Western restaurant could cost up to $10, while a working local earned $15 to $50 per month.

After the Second World War, Hong Kong culture was influenced by British culture. The working-class Hongkongers became influenced by European customs, milk was occasionally added to black tea, and sometimes accompanied by cakes, sandwiches, or other kind of foreign confectionery. The set up of cha chaan tengs targeted a local audience. Providing different kinds of Canto-Western cuisine and drinks at low prices was regarded as "soy sauce Western food" (豉油西餐).

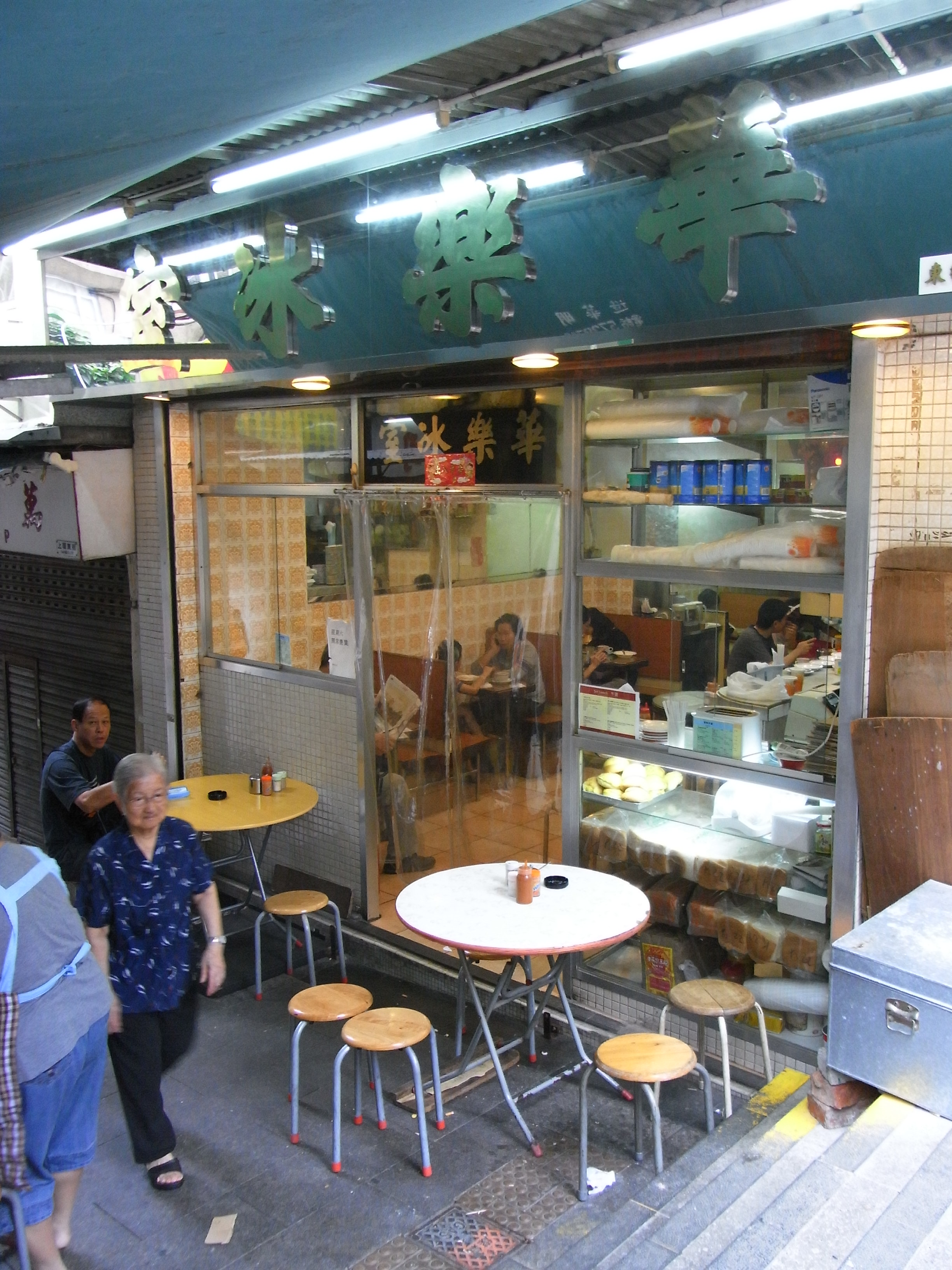
Wah Lok Cafe located at Central, Hong Kong

In the 1950s and 60s, cha chaan tengs sprang up as rising lower class incomes made such "Western food" affordable, causing "soy sauce western restaurants" and bing sutt (冰室, "ice rooms") to turn into cha chaan teng to satisfy the high demand of affordable and fast Hong Kong-style Western food.

In recent years, the management of cha chaan tengs has adapted to developments in the Hong Kong economy and society. During the 1997 Asian financial crisis, cha chaan tengs became much more popular in Hong Kong as they still provided the cheapest food for the public. Before 2007, most cha chaan tengs allowed people to smoke, and some waiters would even smoke when working. Since 1 January 2007, Hong Kong law prohibits smoking within the indoor premises of restaurants.

In April 2007, one of the Hong Kong political officers suggested that cha chaan teng be listed in the UNESCO Intangible Cultural Heritage Lists, because of its important role in Hong Kong society. On 19 December 2007, lawmaker Choy So Yuk proposed, during a legislative council session, that Hong Kong's cha chaan teng be recognised and put up to UNESCO as an "intangible cultural heritage of humanity". The proposal came about after a Hong Kong poll found that seven out of ten people believed the cafes deserved a UNESCO cultural listing. However, despite these proposals, cha chaan teng was not added to UNESCO's lists.

In June 2014, a number of well-known dishes at cha chaan tengs—namely milk tea, yuenyeung, pineapple bun, and egg tart—were enlisted into the first Intangible Cultural Heritage Inventory of Hong Kong.

== Name and description ==
The name, literally "tea restaurant", serves to distinguish the restaurants from Western restaurants that provide water to customers instead of tea. Cha chaan teng establishments provide tea (usually weak tea) called "clear tea" (清茶 cing1 caa4) to customers as soon as they are seated. Some patrons use this hot tea to wash their utensils, a common custom in Hong Kong. The "tea" in the name refers to inexpensive black tea, which differs from the traditional Chinese tea served in traditional dim sum restaurants and teahouses (茶樓).

The "tea" may also refer to tea drinks, such as the Hong Kong-style milk tea and iced lemon tea, which are served in many cha chaan tengs. The older generations in Hong Kong refer to dining in these restaurants as yum sai cha (飲西茶; lit: "drinking Western tea"), in contrast to going yum cha.

Some cha chaan tengs adopt the word "café" in their names. This is especially the case when located in English-speaking countries where they are commonly known as "Hong Kong-style cafes" and are instead best known for their serving of yuenyeung and Hong Kong-style (condensed milk) coffee.

== Culture ==
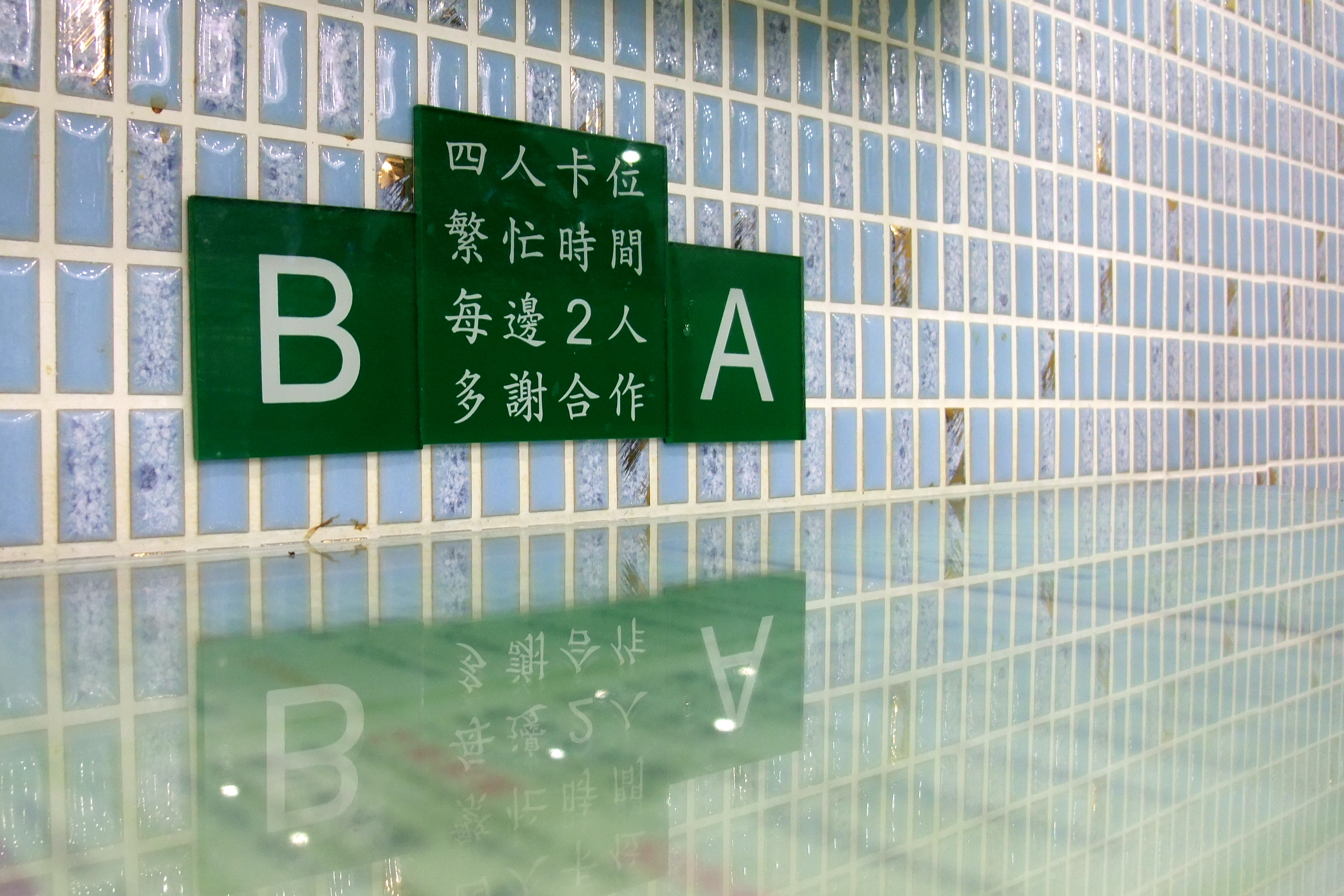
Table-sharing etiquette sign at a cha chaan teng (Hong Kong)

=== Fast service and high efficiency ===
Usually, tea restaurants have high customer turnover, at 10–20 minutes for a sitting. Customers typically receive their dishes after five minutes. The waiters take the order with their left hand and pass the dishes with their right hand. This is said to embody Hong Kong's hectic lifestyle. During peak periods, long queues form outside many restaurants.

=== Long working hours ===
The staff in a cha chaan teng work long hours, sometimes also night shifts.

=== Trend ===
Because of the limited land and expensive rent, cha chaan tengs are gradually being replaced by chain restaurants, such as Café de Coral, Maxim's, and Fairwood. As chain restaurants dominate the market, Hong Kong's cha chaan teng culture is disappearing. They are, however, increasing in popularity overseas, with many opening up in Cantonese diaspora communities as a casual alternative to more traditional Chinese restaurants.

=== Common phrases and abbreviations ===
To speed up the ordering process, waiters use a range of shorthands when writing down orders (essentially, a Cantonese equivalent to the phenomenon of American diner lingo).

- The character 反 (spoken as faan, meaning 'opposite') is used to represent 白飯 (baak faan, meaning 'white rice').
- "0T" stands for lemon tea (0 reads as ling, which is phonetically similar to the first word of lemon (檸, ning) and phonetically identical to how most Hong Kong people now pronounce the word (ling) as a result of lazy sounds. "T" stands for "tea"). "0" is sometimes replaced with "O", so "OT" is written instead.

Customers similarly use special phrases when ordering:

- 走冰 (zau bing, lit. 'leave (depart) ice') or 走雪 (zau syut, lit. 'leave snow') ― To order cold drinks without ice
- 飛砂走奶 (fei saa zau naai, lit. '"get rid of sand and milk"') To have the drink prepared without coarse sugar/powdered sugar (the "sand") and milk, when ordering coffee or tea
- 茶走 (caa zau, lit. 'tea leave') ― Hong Kong-style milk tea without sugar; condensed milk is used to replace evaporated milk for sweetness instead
- 加底 (gaa dai, lit. 'add base') ― For extra rice or noodles in a dish, typically costs extra
- 炒底 (caau dai, lit. 'stir-fry base') ― For rice or noodles in a dish to be stir-fried

== Menus ==
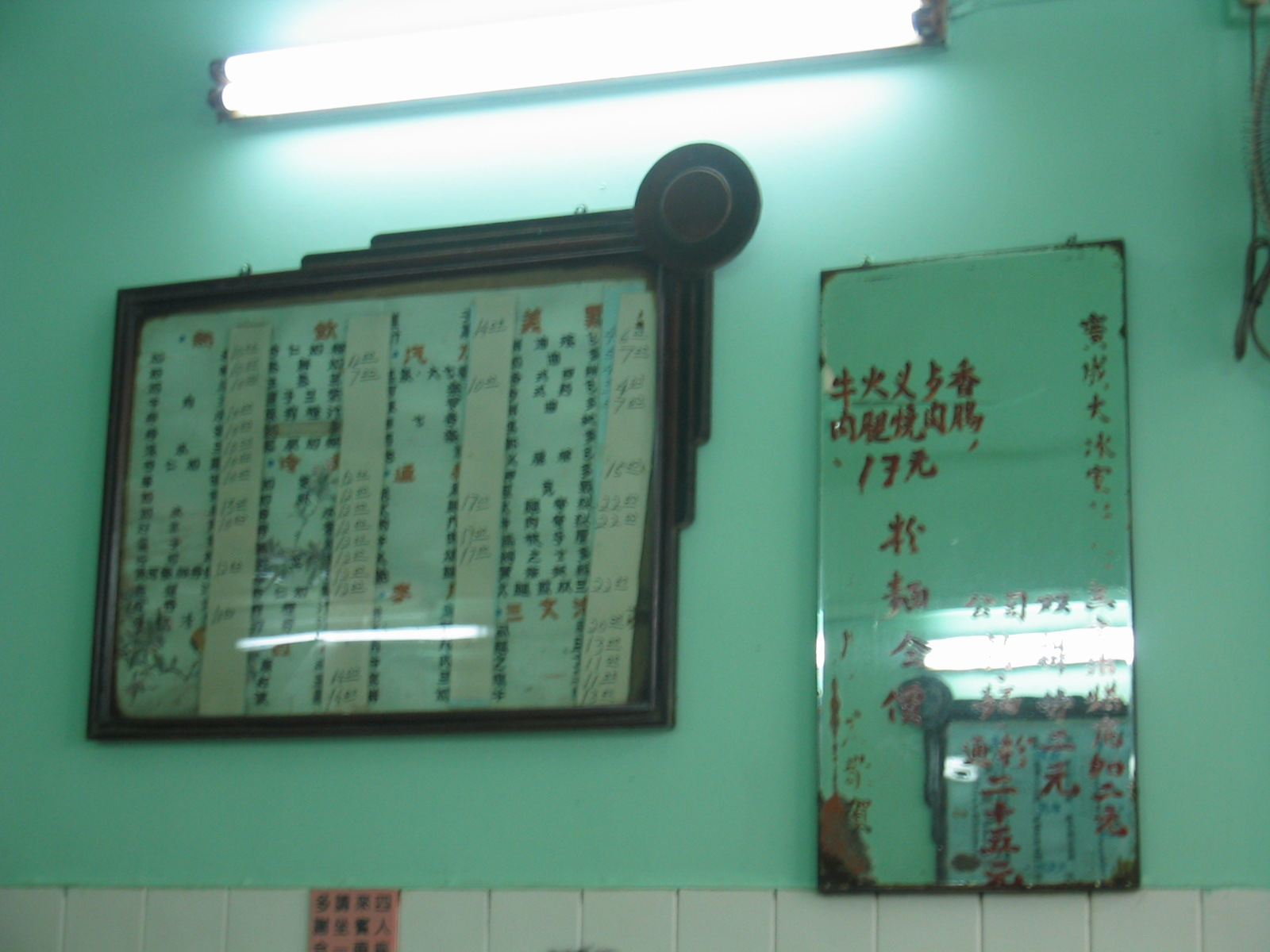
Two menus, one on the board and another on glass, in a bing sut in Sheung Shui, Hong Kong. No rice plates can be seen on the menus.

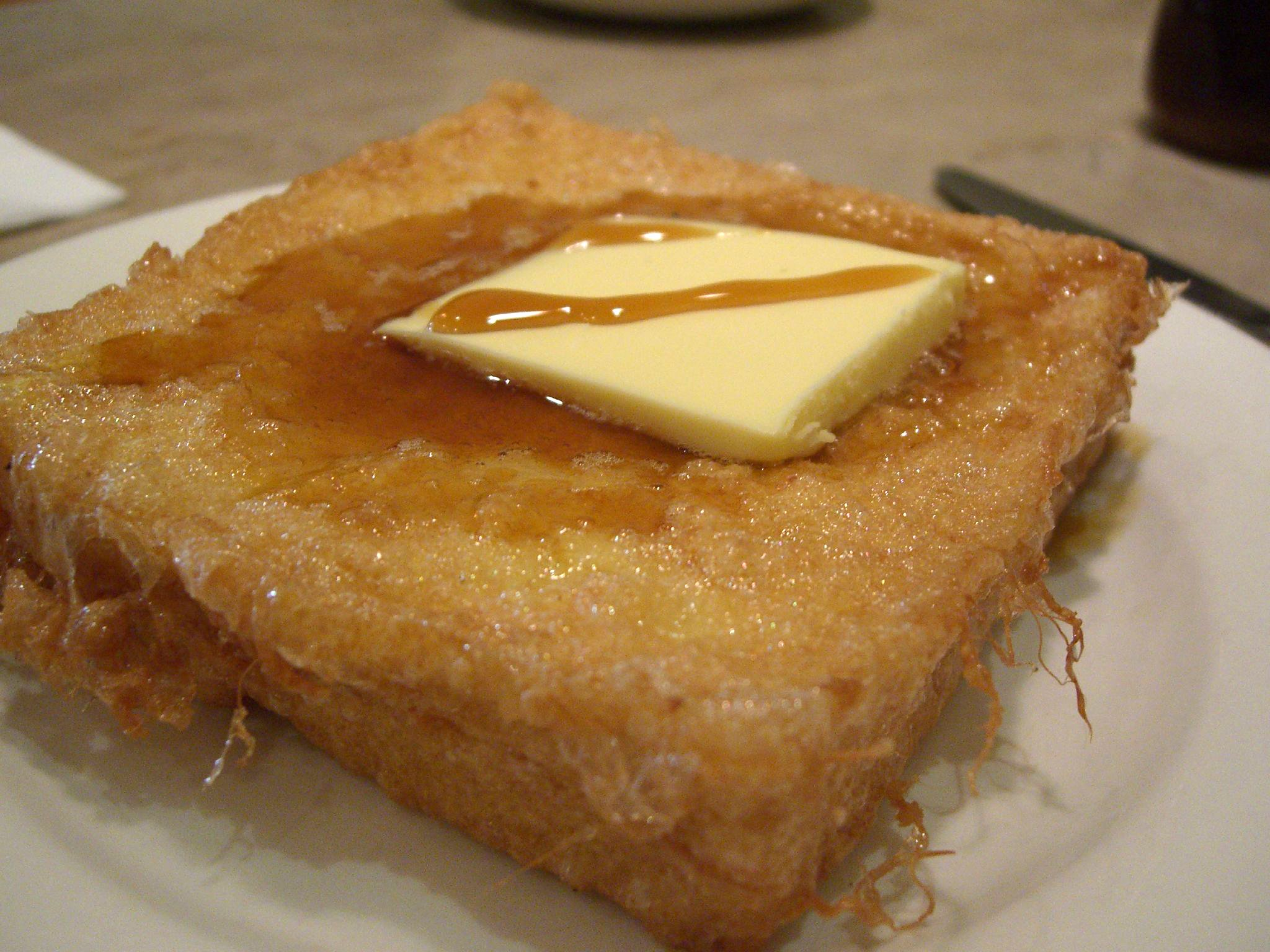
Hong Kong-style French toast

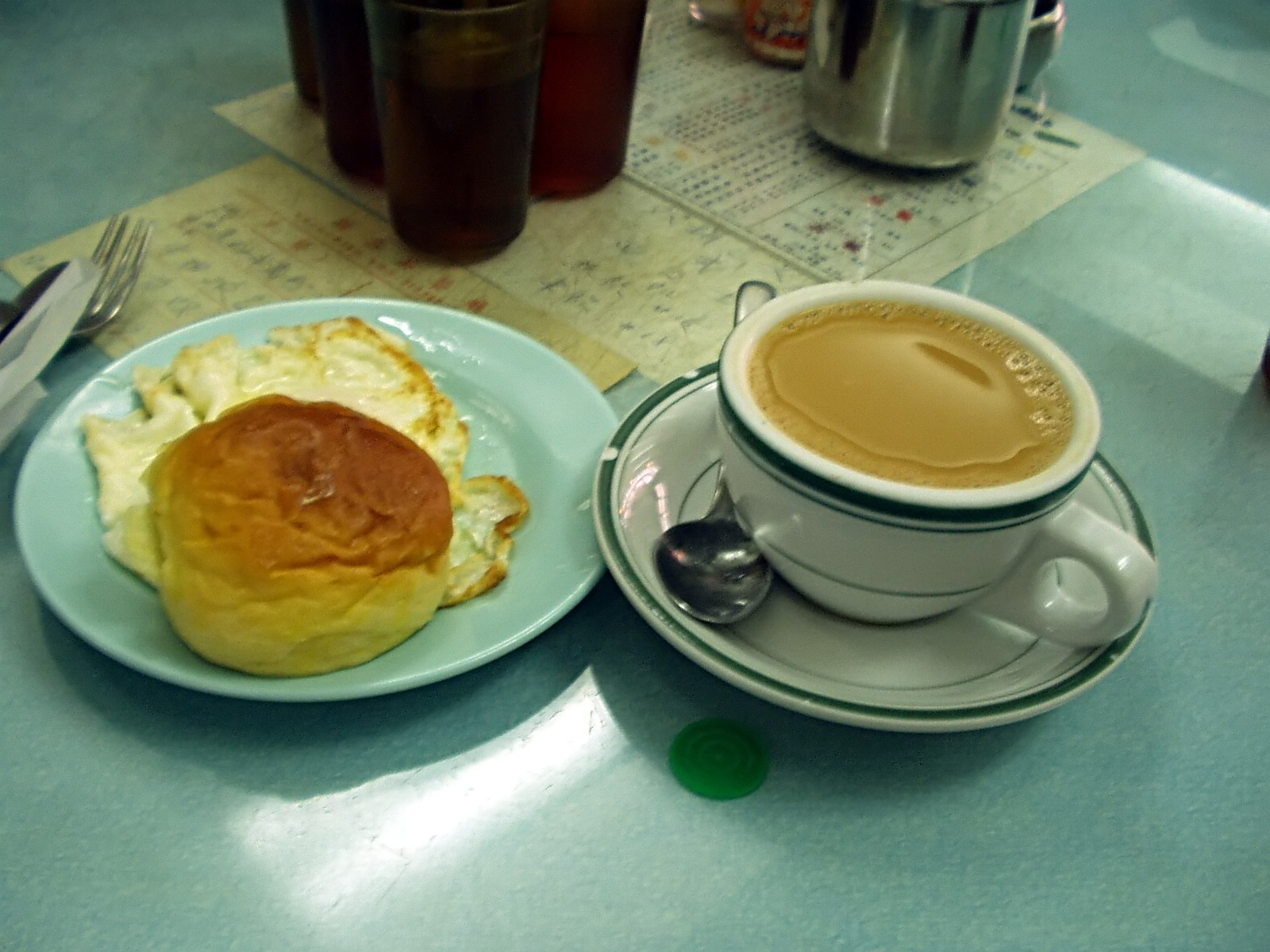
A typical breakfast, eggs and a bun, including a cup of silk-sock milk tea

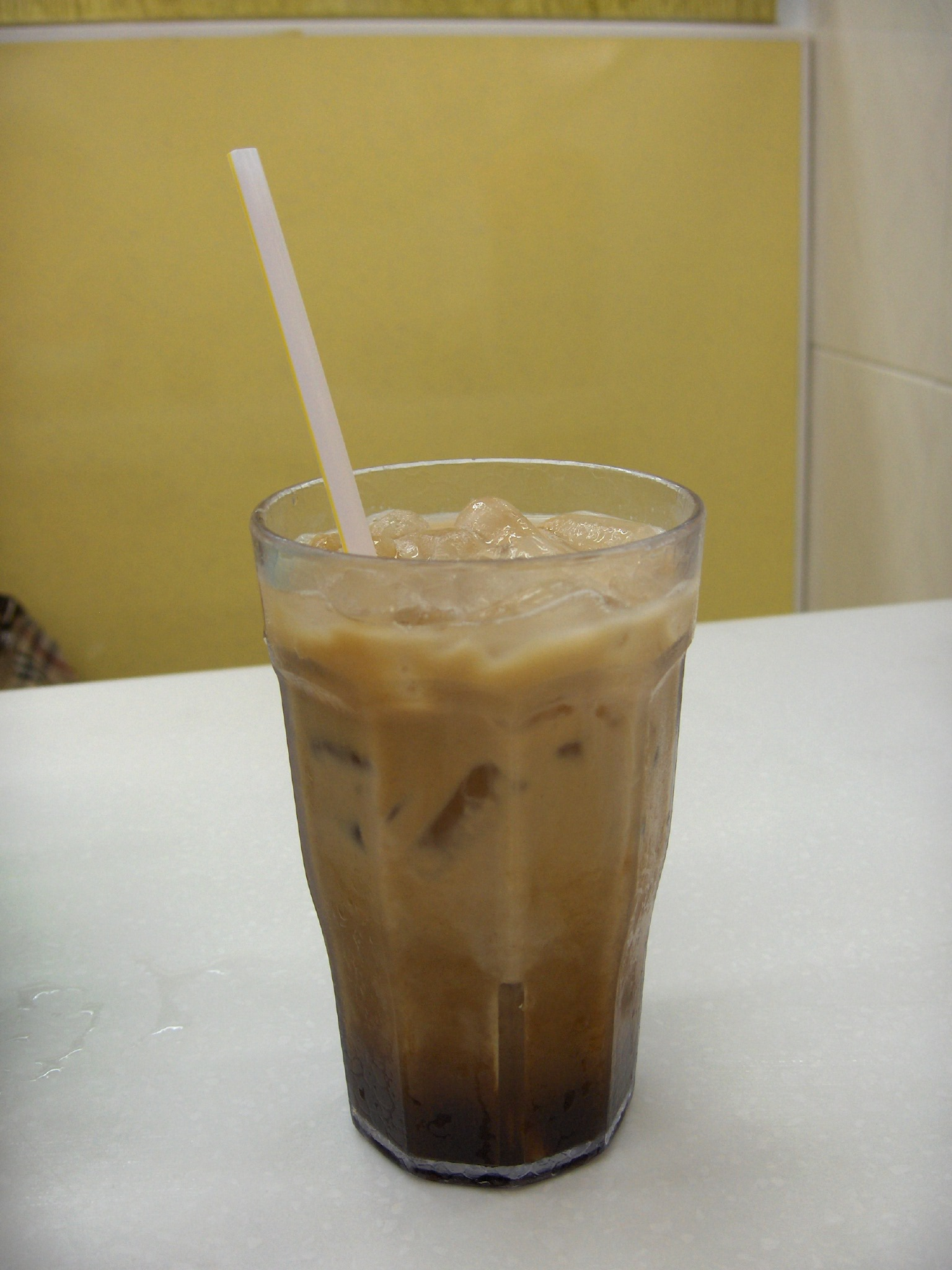
Yuanyang, mixture of coffee and Hong Kong-style milk tea

A cha chaan teng serves a wide range of food, from steak to wonton noodles to curry to sandwiches, e.g. Hong Kong-style French toast. Both fast food and à-la-carte dishes are available. A larger cha chaan teng often consists of three cooking places: a "water bar" (水吧) which makes drinks, toast/sandwiches, and instant noodles; a "noodle stall" which prepares Chiuchow-style noodles (including wonton noodles); and a kitchen for producing rice plates and other more expensive dishes.

== Food and drinks ==
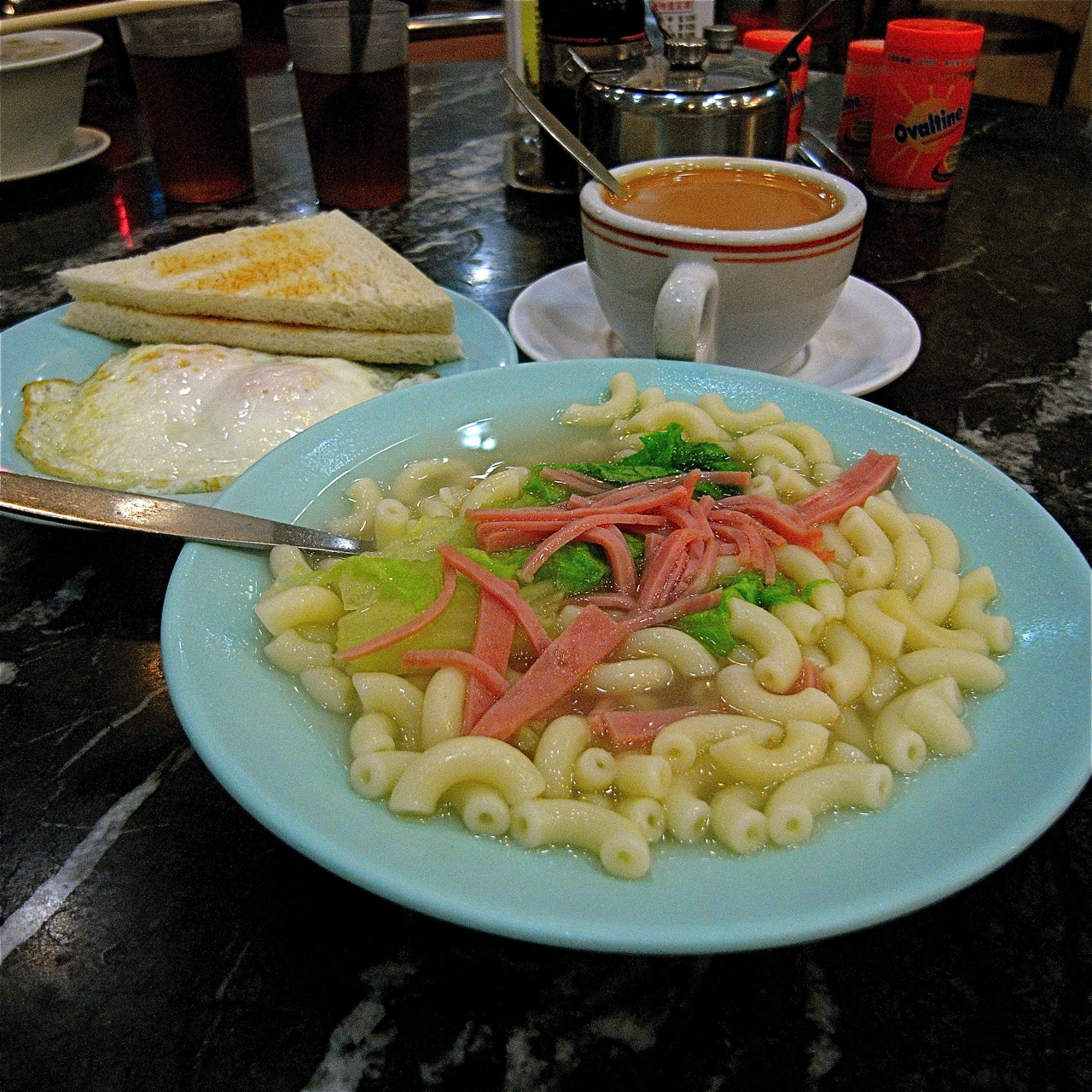
Soup macaroni in Hong Kong

Drinks

The invention of drinks like yuenyeung (鴛鴦), iced tea with lemon (凍檸茶), and Coca-Cola with lemon (檸樂) is often credited culturally to cha chaan tengs.

- Coffee: Two types exist, instant and in powder form, the latter being more common. Often served with condensed milk, especially overseas.
- Black coffee: Hongkongers usually called this zaai fe (lit. "just coffee", emphasising its plain texture) or "fei saa zau naai" (lit. "get rid of sand and milk", i.e. coffee without sugar (the "sand") and milk)
- Hong Kong-style milk tea: A highly popular drink in Hong Kong. Its standard is judged by its aroma, smoothness, and concentration. The tea is soaked in an iron container for several hours to let the flavour come out. If the customer wants condensed milk instead of normal milk, people will often say "caa zau" (lit. "tea go")
- Sweet soy milk (豆漿): Soy milk sweetened with cane sugar and served either hot or cold.
- Yuenyeung: A mixture of coffee and tea, originated in Hong Kong. According to traditional Chinese medicine, coffee and tea are "hot" and "cold" in nature, respectively. A mixing of both thus then yields the best combination for the beverage.
- Black and white yuenyeung/children's yuenyeung: A mixture of Ovaltine and Horlicks, originated in Hong Kong.
- Horlicks
- Ovaltine
- Lemonade: Commonly served without sugar or syrup.
- Lemon with Ribena
- Lemon with honey: Often, to reduce cost, the honey is replaced with "watercress honey"
- Salted lemon with 7 Up (鹹檸七): 7 Up, adding lemon marinated in salt, which is reputedly helpful for a sore throat
- Black cow (黑牛): Coca-Cola with vanilla ice cream.
- Snow White (白雪公主): Sprite or 7-Up with vanilla ice cream.
- Cream soda with milk (忌廉溝鮮奶): A drink popular in the 1970s. Its cultural influence is represented by the movie Cream Soda and Milk (1981).
- Boiled water with egg (滾水蛋): A raw egg added into boiled water. This was a drink popular in the 60s since Hongkongers could not afford to eat meat and absorb protein regularly. It is usually drunk with white sugar.
- Red bean ice: A drink with red bean, evaporated milk, and ice
- Soft drinks: Coca-Cola, 7 Up, Fanta, and cream soda are some common selections.

Adding ice in a drink may cost an extra fee. Some people simply ask for a glass of ice.

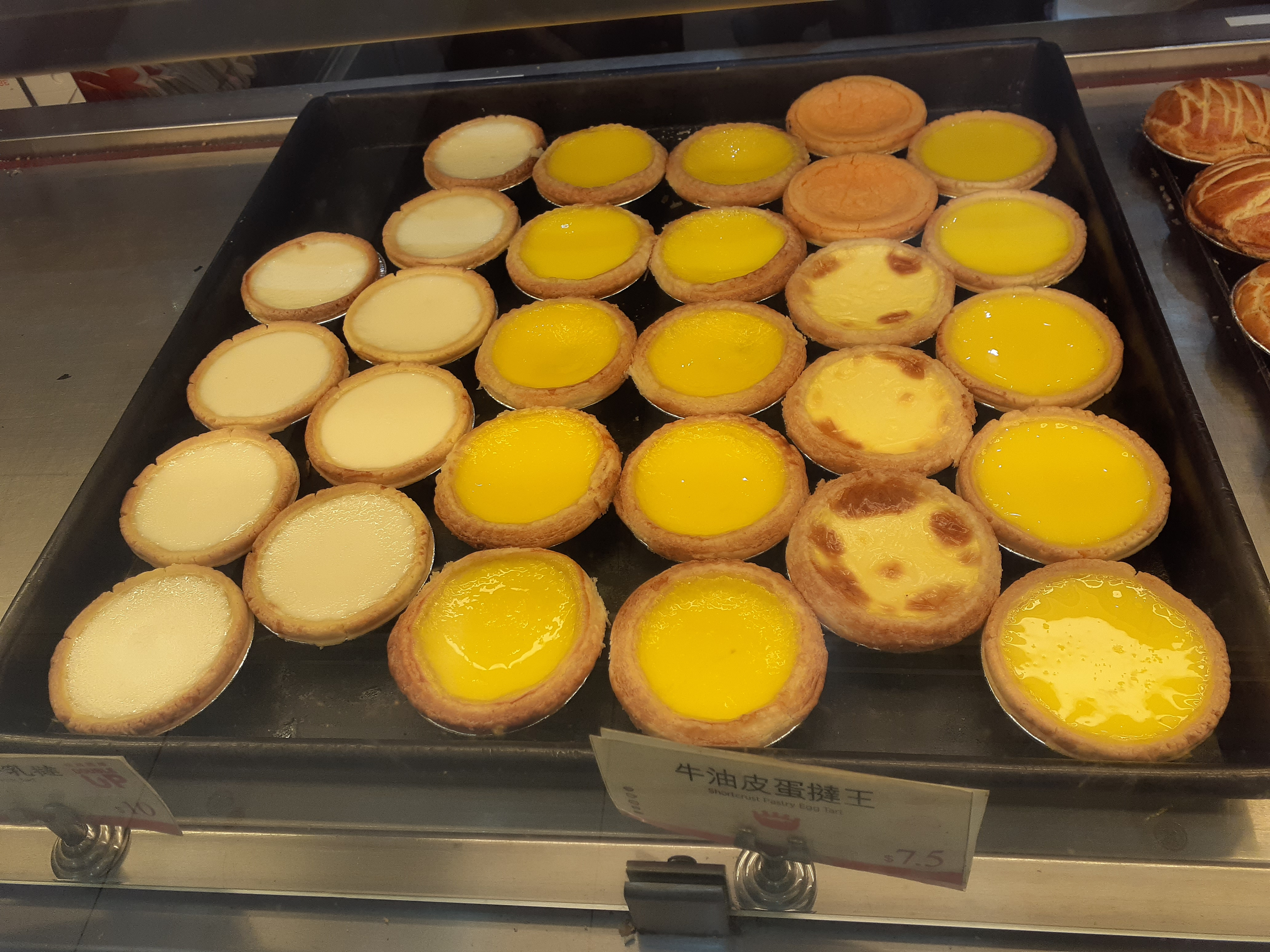
Different variations of egg tarts

Snacks

- Toast: This includes toast with condensed milk and butter/peanut butter, toast with jam and butter, toast with butter in a sliced form, and Hong Kong-style French toast
- Sandwich: Sandwiches found in cha chaan tengs usually include egg, ham, corned beef, Spam (or other luncheon meat), or a mixture of any as a filling. Club sandwiches are also very common. A difference between the sandwiches found in cha chaan tengs and other eateries is that only white bread is used. The customer has the option of omitting the crust of the bread, and requesting that the bread be toasted before making their sandwich.
- Egg tart
- Hong Kong-style buns: Includes pineapple buns (with or without a slab of butter inside), cocktail buns, satay beef buns, barbecued pork buns (char siu bao), and others.
- Spring rolls
- Hotdog: Sausage bun with ketchup

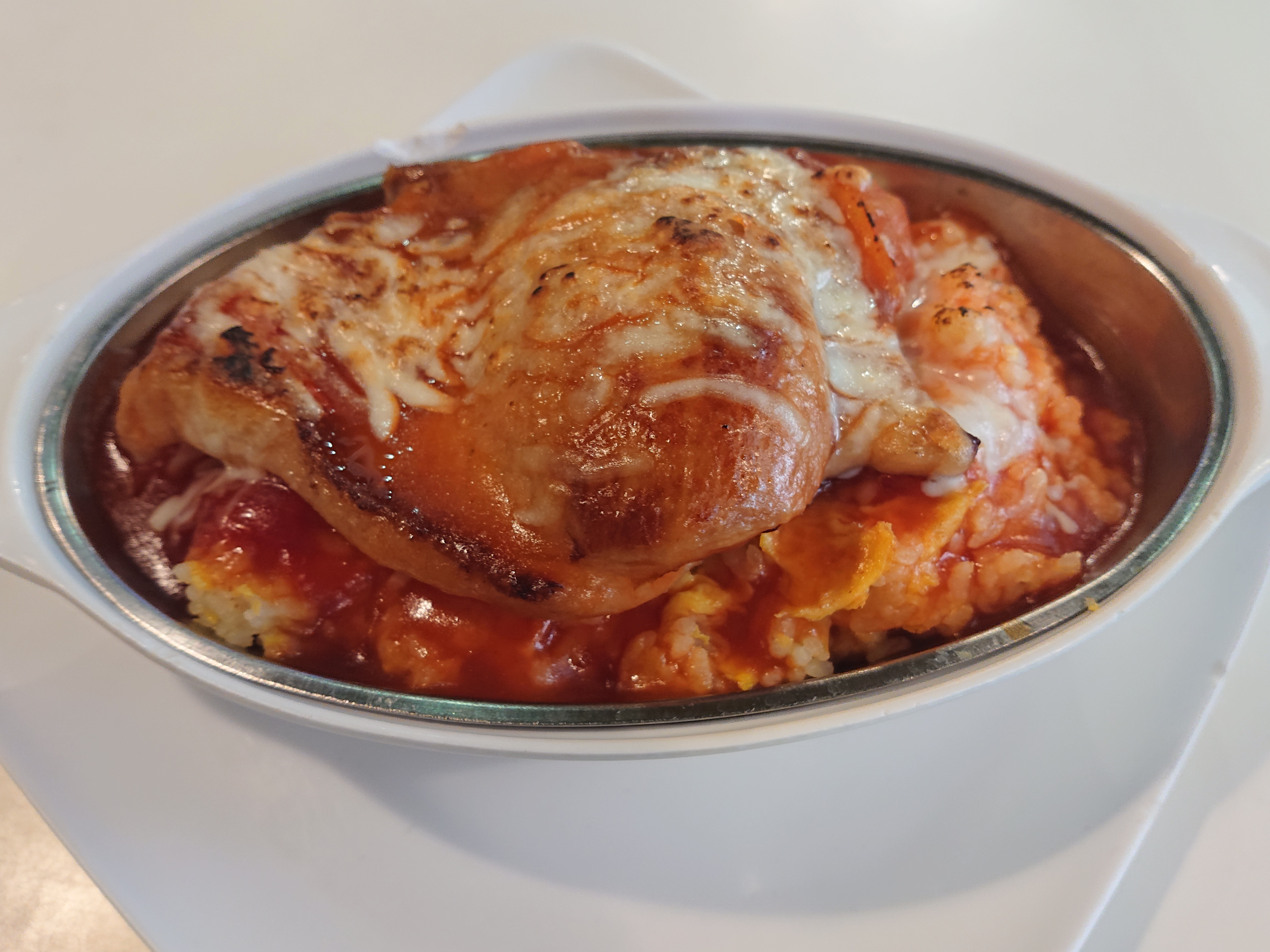
Baked pork chop rice

Fried dishes

- Various fried rice and noodle dishes
- Hong Kong-style spaghetti bolognese
- Fried instant noodles
- Beef chow fun
- Baked pork chop rice
- Salad pork ribs (zh-yue:沙律骨): fried pork ribs with mayonnaise and condensed milk

Soup dishes

- Instant or udon noodles in soup
- Macaroni in soup
- Soup noodles with fish balls, wontons, meat balls, and other processed seafood

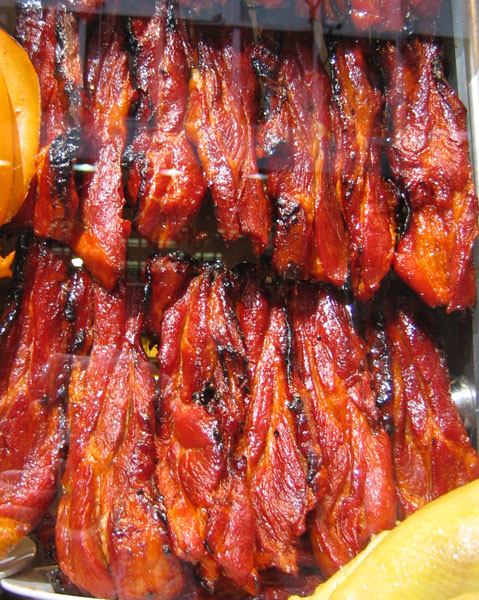
Char siu

Miscellaneous dishes

- Barbecued pork (char siu): Not found at all cha chaan tengs
- Chinese-style beef tenderloin (zh:中式牛柳)
- Congee and yau ja gwei, a Chinese cruller
- Sizzler- food served on a hot metal plate and come with a type of sauce. Example: steak with chip and black peppercorn sauce

== Set meals ==
A feature found in cha chaan tengs is set meals. There are various sets available throughout the day for breakfast, lunch, afternoon tea, and dinner. The lunch and dinner sets usually include a soup and a drink. Generally, there is an additional HK$2–3 charge for cold drinks. Sometimes, an additional HK$5 is charged for toasting the bread (烘底).

Other sets include:

- "Nutritious set" (營養餐) – Comes with milk and other nutritional food
- "Constant set" (常餐) – Offered all day long, hence the name (it usually consists of a main course, omelette, wheat foodstuff, white bread with butter, and a drink). The wheat foodstuff comes with different choices such as spiced pork cubes, salted vegetable with sliced pork, or luncheon meat.
- "Fast set" (快餐) – Immediately served (usually rice with sausages/ ham/ fried eggs with gravy)
- "Special set" (特餐) – Chef's (or Boss's) recommendation

== Tables and seats ==
Generally, the tables in cha chaan tengs are square for four people, or round for six to eight people. For each table, there is a piece of glass that covers the top and some menus are placed between the table and glass. During lunch or dinner, customers are sometimes requested to "daap toi" (搭枱), meaning they share a table with other customers who were already seated before. This helps save space, provide waiting guests with seats faster, and give customers in a hurry a seat.

== Interiors and utensils ==
Much of the plastic-ware found on the table is provided by beverage companies as a form of advertising. This plastic-ware includes containers holding toothpicks, plastic menu holders, etc. Brands like Ovaltine, Horlicks, and Ribena are the usual providers. To minimise costs, cha chaan tengs also rarely have utensils that bear their own brand name. As a result, the same utensils can be found in many different cha chaan tengs, even different chains. These utensils can be bought in supermarkets, department stores, and stores specializing in restaurant supplies.

Walls and floors in cha chaan tengs are often tiled because they are easier to clean (especially in Hong Kong's humid summer weather). In overseas communities, these restaurants are famous for stocking Chinese newspapers and having LCD televisions on the wall, broadcasting Hong Kong news services.

== Variations ==
Other kinds of local restaurants related to cha chaan teng in Hong Kong include chaan sutt (餐室; lit. "meal chamber"), bing sutt (冰室; lit. "ice chamber"), and bing teng (冰廳; lit. "ice dining room"), which provide a lighter and more limited selection of food than cha chaan teng.

In the old days, these eateries only sold different types of "ice", sandwiches, and pasta but no rice plates. However, some of the restaurants bearing these titles today ignore the tradition, and provide all kinds of rice plates and even wonton noodles. Original chaan sutts, bing sutts, and bing tengs, which can be regarded as the prototype of cha chaan tengs, are now scarce in Hong Kong.

In June 2009, Hong Kong retail design store G.O.D. collaborated with Starbucks and created a store with a "Bing Sutt Corner" at their store on Duddell Street. It is a concept that fuses the retro Hong Kong teahouse style with the contemporary look of a coffeehouse.

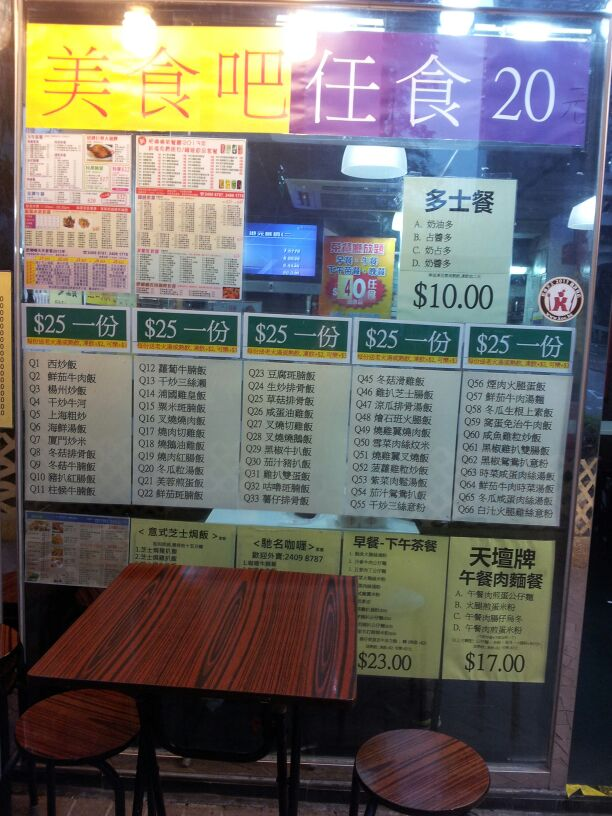
A menu posted outside a cha chaan teng in Tsuen Wan, advertising buffet service

=== Buffet ===
Some cha chaan tengs have moved to a buffet style of service. Fei Du Du Cha Chaan Teng, owned by Stephen Cheng in Tsuen Wan, was the first known cha chaan teng to move to a buffet style, on 1 March 2013. The idea originated when Cheng, facing high rent, decided to try a new method to run his business to compete with the high inflation rate. With reported success, several other restaurants also switched to buffet style.

Customer reception seemed generally positive, as prices decreased. One customer from Sham Shui Po said the meal was almost 70% cheaper than the food served in the industrial regions nearby.

== In media and popular culture ==
- The similarities between the different set meals were satirised by My life as McDull, a McDull movie.
- As an important part of Hong Kong culture, cha chaan teng is featured in many Hong Kong movies and TV dramas:
  - Featured in popular sitcom Virtues of Harmony, a TVB-made soap opera tells the story of a family who runs a cha chaan teng, usually boasting the egg tart and "silk-stocking milk tea" produced by them.
  - Stephen Chow played a cha chaan teng waiter in the 1998 comedy The Lucky Guy (行運一條龍), and a cha chaan teng meal-delivery-boy in King of Comedy (喜劇之王) in 1999.
- Some beverage companies put the term cha chaan teng on their products, such as "cha chaan teng milk tea" and "cha chaan teng lemon tea".
- MC Cheung's 'Loser' music video was filmed in a real bing teng in Yau Ma Tei in 2021. He acted as a staff in it.
- Keung To's role in the 2022 Hong Kong film Mama's Affair.

== See also ==
- Cantonese restaurant
- Carinderia
- Dai pai dong
- Dhaba Indian diner
- Greasy spoon
- Kopi tiam
- List of restaurants in China
- List of tea houses
- Macanese cuisine
- Mido Cafe
