= Yin Yong =

Yin Yong may refer to:

- Yuenyeung, a drink created by mixing coffee with tea
- Yin Yong (politician) (born 1969), mayor of Beijing, China

== See also ==
- Ying Yong, Chinese politician and lawyer
