= Duddell =

Duddell is a surname. Notable people with the surname include:

- Blanche Gladys du Bois Duddell, (born 1907, later Gladys Colston, British tennis player, sister of William
- George and Frederick Duddell, New York landowners, recognised in name of Duddell Street
- Joe Duddell (born 1972), British composer, musician and conductor
- William Duddell (1872–1927), English physicist and engineer, brother of Gladys

- Duddell medal and prize, award named for him, awarded by Institute of Physics 1923–2008
