= Yuan Yang (disambiguation) =

Yuan Yang (born 1990) is a British politician.

Yuan Yang may also refer to:

- Yuan Yang (footballer) (born 1985), retired Hong Kong football player

== See also ==
- Yuanyuan Yang, Chinese-American computer scientist
- Yuanyang (disambiguation)
