= Duddell Street =

Street in Central, Hong Kong

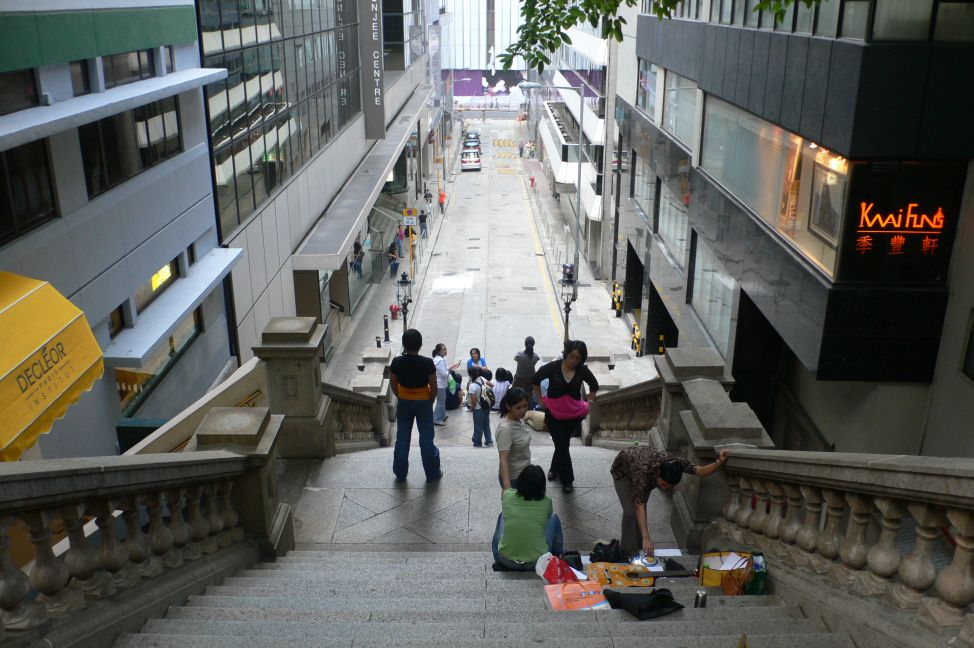
- Entrance to Duddell Street from Ice House Street
- Interactive map of Duddell Street
- Native name: 都爹利街 (Yue Chinese)
- Location: Central, Hong Kong
- Coordinates: 22.28017°N 114.15749°E
- South end: Ice House Street
- North end: Queen's Road Central

Construction
- Construction start: 1875
- Completed: 1889

Duddell Street
- Traditional Chinese: 都爹利街
Transcriptions
Standard Mandarin
- Hanyu Pinyin: Dūdiēlì Jiē
Yue: Cantonese
- Yale Romanization: Dōu dē leih gāai
- Jyutping: Dou1 de1 lei6 gaai1

Duddell Street (Chinese: 都爹利街; Jyutping: dou1 de1 lei6 gaai1) is a small street located near the Lan Kwai Fong district in Central, Hong Kong. Named after George and Frederick Duddell, it stretches from Ice House Street to Queen's Road Central. The street is noted for containing the city's last four gas lamps.

== History ==
This short street includes, at its southern end, a flight of granite steps that were built between 1875 and 1889; (Note: The exact year in which the granite steps were constructed is unknown, but a series of maps of Hong Kong from the period indicate that they came into existence between 1875 and 1889.) these lead up to Ice House Street. The street was named in honour of brothers George and Frederick Duddell, who were landowners in the early days of the colony, having emigrated from Macau after the British Empire annexed Hong Kong Island in 1841. George was an auctioneer and ultimately a significant property owner in the area around the present Duddell Street in the mid-19th century. When Frederick and his wife died, they were both buried back in Macau at the Old Protestant Cemetery.

== Gas lamps ==
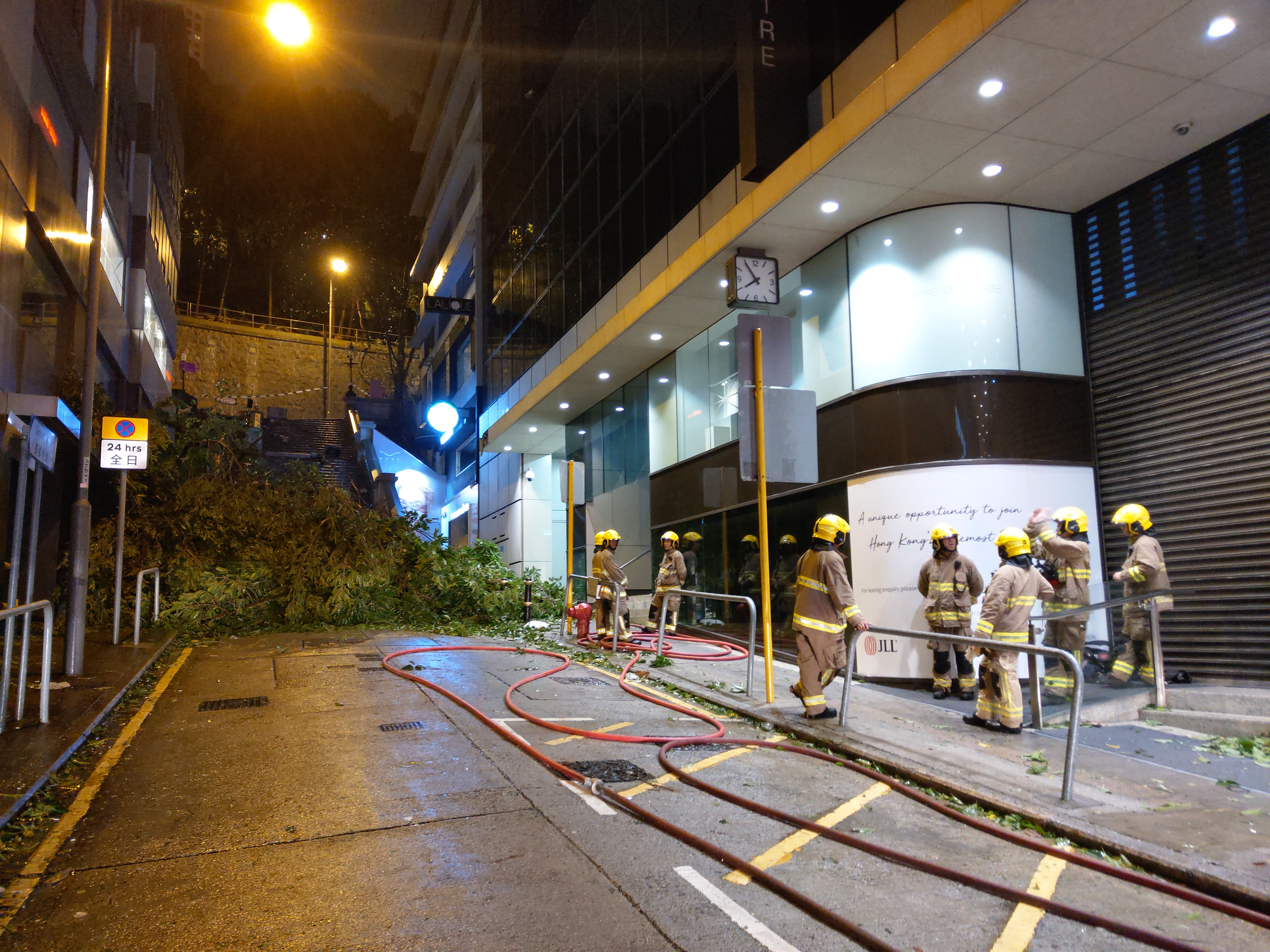
Firemen stand by to watch for any gas leaks after the gas lamps at Duddell Street, Hong Kong, were damaged by Typhoon Mangkhut

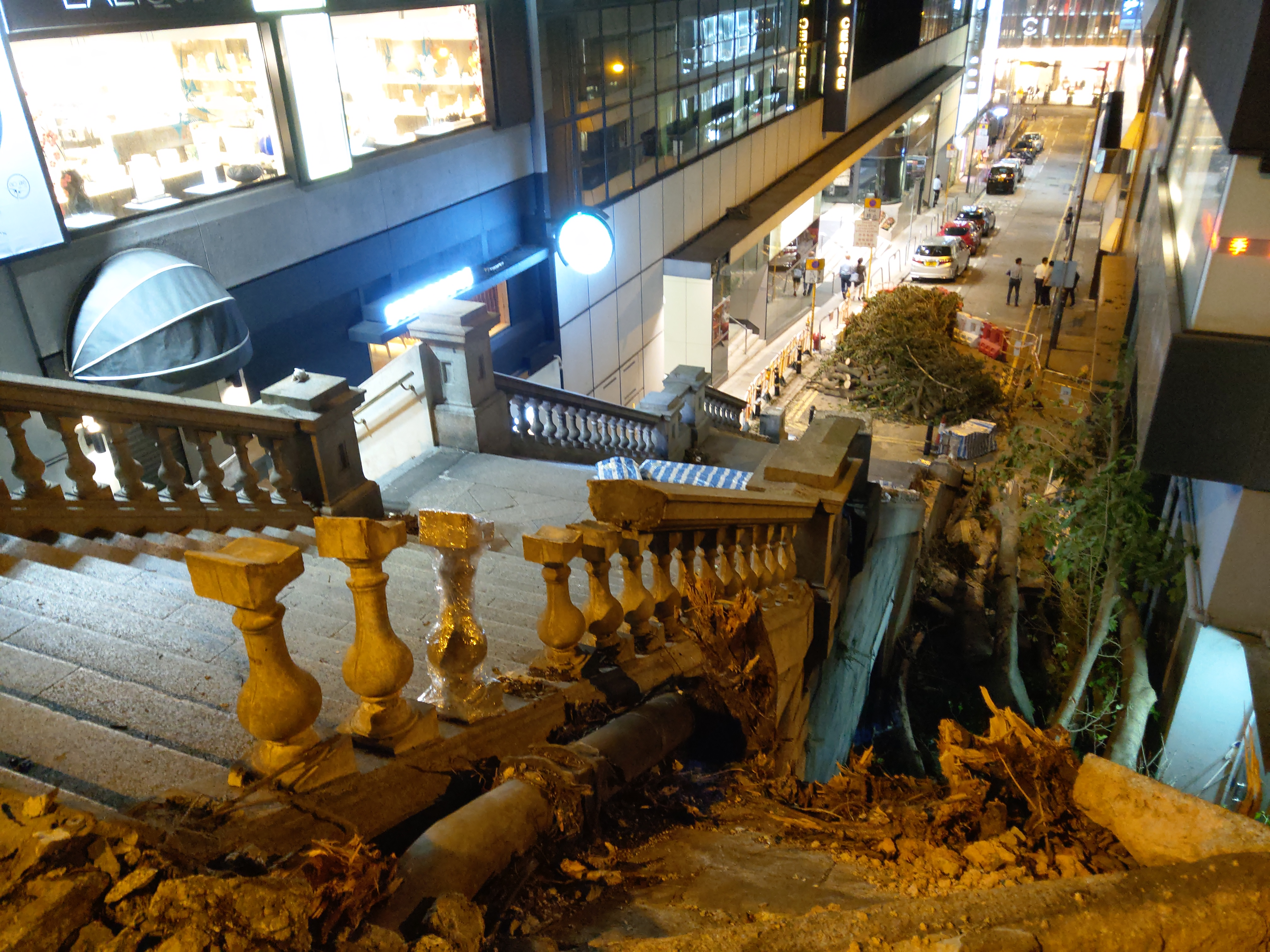
Damage to the stairs, and missing gas lamps, in September 2018

The street is famous for its four gas-powered street lamps, which are the only surviving and working examples of their kind in Hong Kong since the electrification of street lights in 1967. The four gas lamps, along with the flight of steps on the street, have been declared a monument since 1979.

The gas lamps are two-light Rochester models supplied by the London-based William Sugg and Company, and were erected in the early 20th century. They are mounted in pairs at either end of the street's steps, and were designed with shorter posts so that they could be mounted on the newels.

The gas lamps were originally lit manually, but are now operated automatically. They are lit daily from 6 pm to 6 am, and are maintained by The Hong Kong and China Gas Company and the Highways Department.

On 16 September 2018, during Typhoon Mangkhut, the four lamps suffered varying degrees of damage, with one of the lamp-posts snapping in two. The broken lamp was removed alongside two others, while one remained with a broken lampshade. Large sections of handrails and the balustrades on the steps were also damaged by falling trees. Repairs cost an estimated HK$4 million, and were completed after 15 months.

== Retail ==
In June 2009, Hong Kong retail design store G.O.D. collaborated with Starbucks to create a "Bing Sutt Corner" in their store on Duddell Street. It is a concept that fuses the retro bing sutt (a traditional Hong Kong teahouse) with the contemporary look of a coffeehouse.

In April 2012, the flagship store of clothing retailer Shanghai Tang was opened at 1 Duddell Street. Designed by Shanghai-based design firm Design MVW, it is known as the 'Shanghai Tang Mansion'. With a floorspace of almost 1,400 m^{2} (15,000 sq ft) it is the largest branch in the world.

== Photos ==
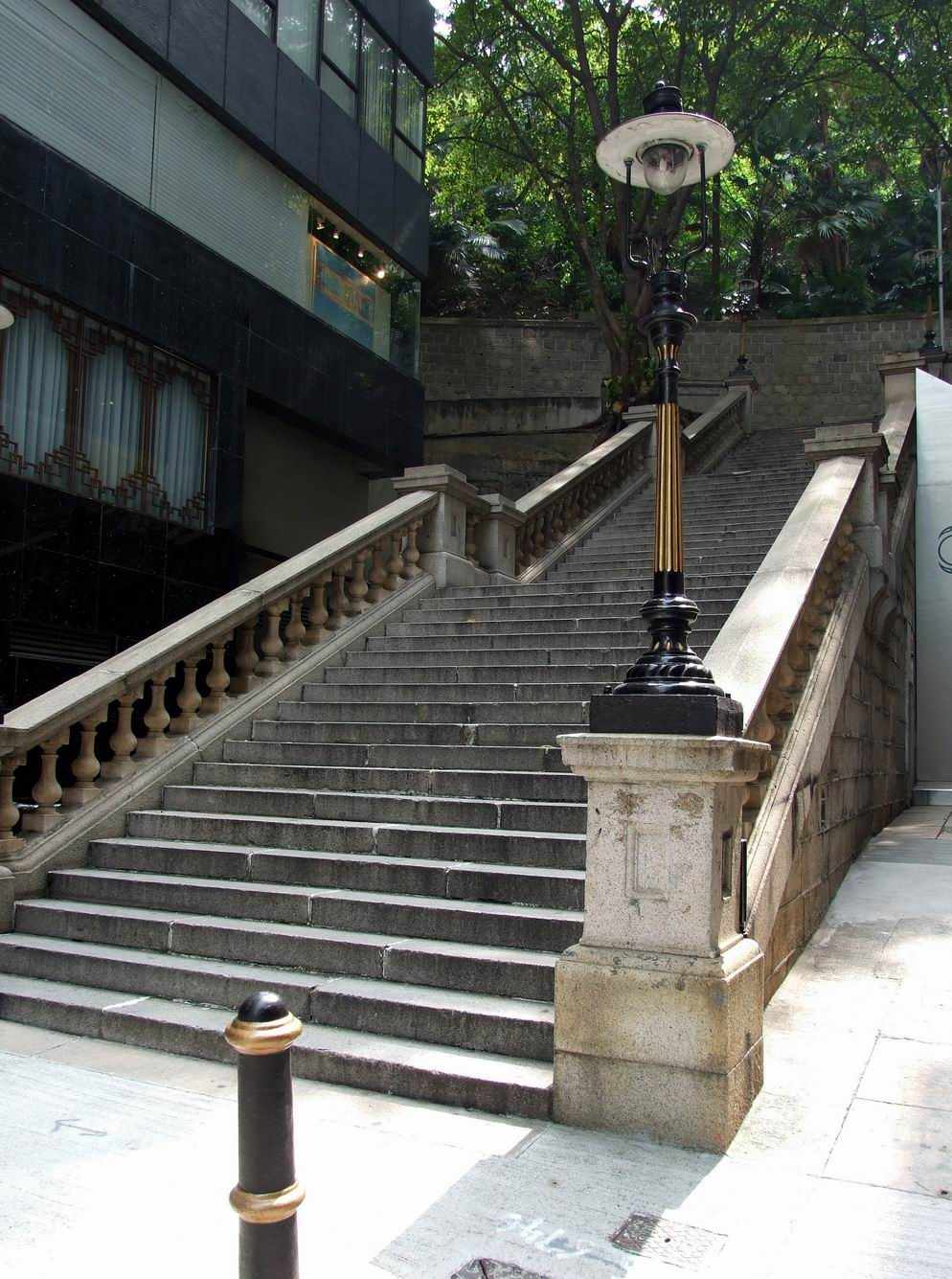
Gas lamp and stairs on Duddell Street

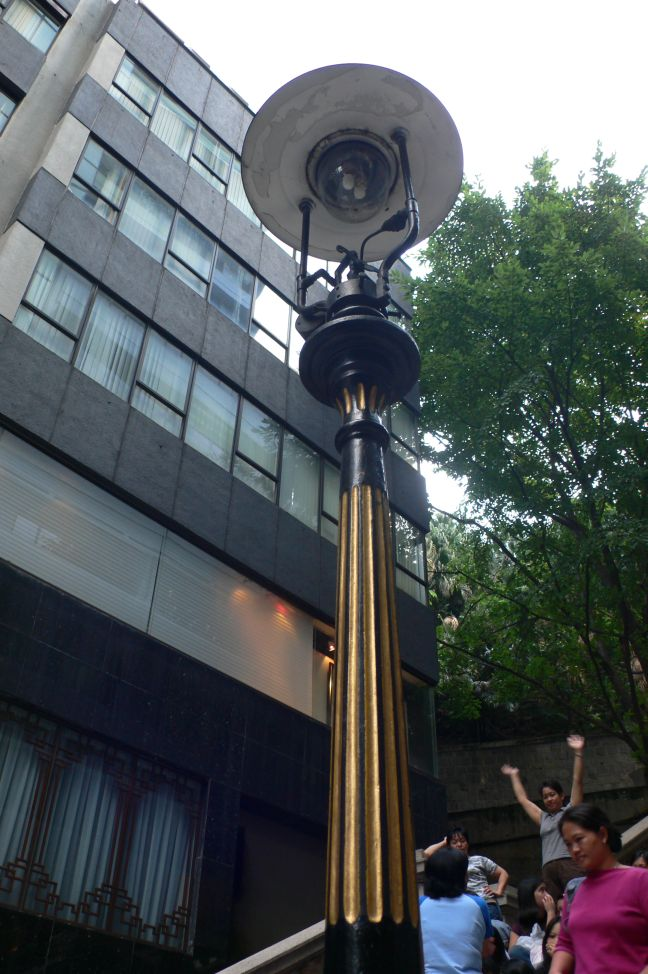
Gas lamp on Duddell Street

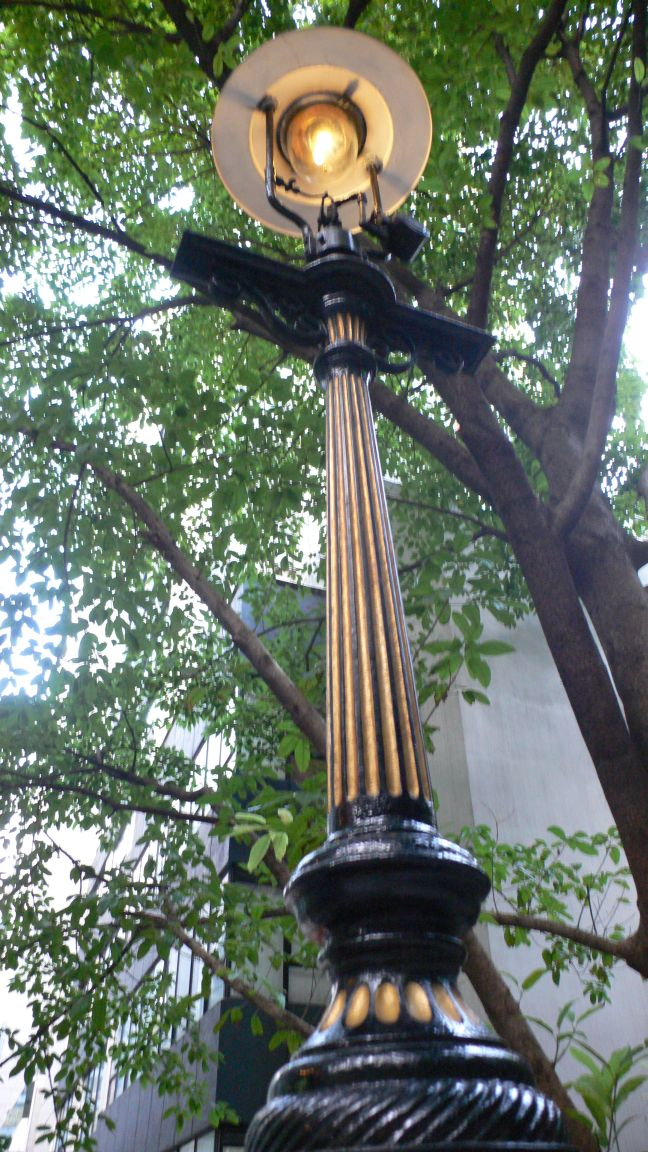
Gas lamp on Duddell Street

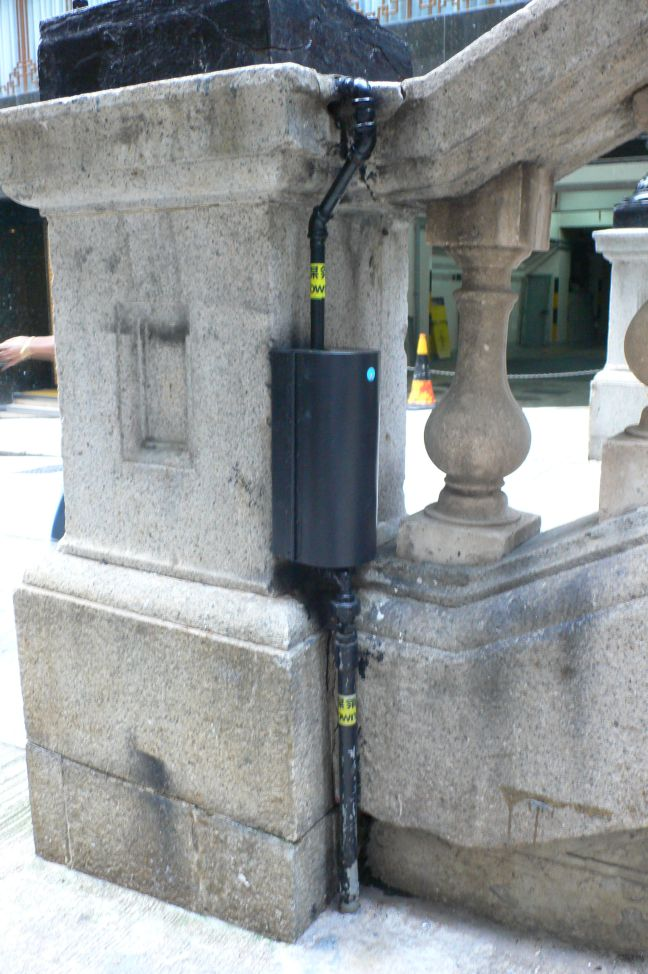
Pipeline supplying town gas to the street lamps

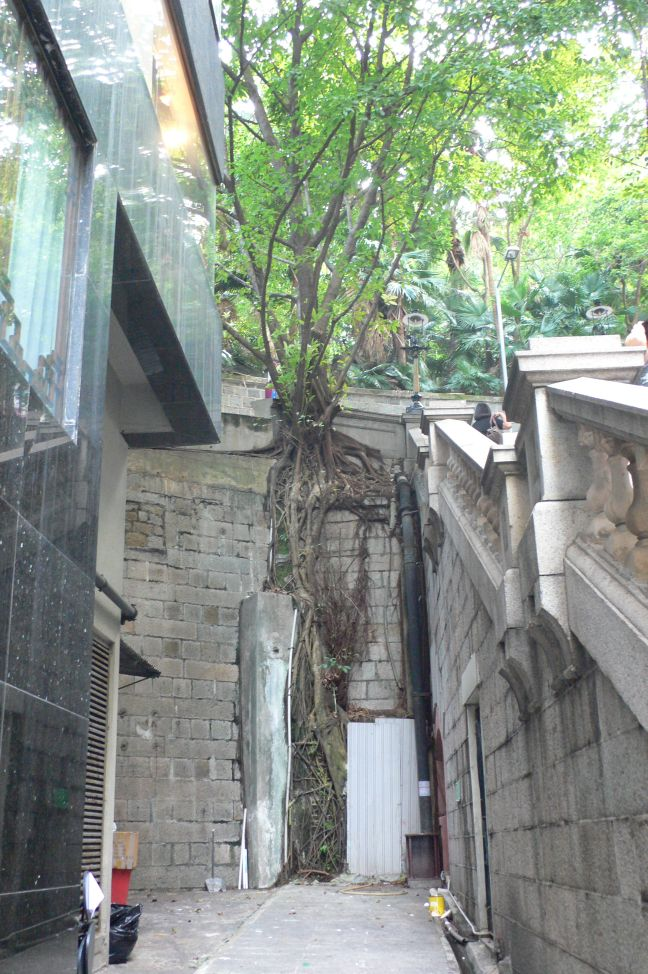
An old tree on the stone wall of the street

== See also ==
- Central and Western Heritage Trail
- List of streets and roads in Hong Kong
