= Sizzler (disambiguation) =

Sizzler may refer to:

== People ==
- George Sisler (1893 – 1973), American baseball player nicknamed "The Sizzler"
- Sizzla (born 1976), Jamaican reggae musician

== Arts, entertainment, and media ==
=== Games and toys ===
- Sizzler (Hot Lotto), the optional tripler for non-jackpot prizes in the lottery game Hot Lotto (known as "Triple Sizzler" in the North Dakota Lottery)
- Sizzler, a magnetic toy
- Sizzler, a laser gun from the game Aquanox
- Sizzler, the award given to a game rated from 90-95% in the 1980s C64 gaming magazine ZZAP!64
- Sizzlers, a 1970s Hot Wheels spin off with a built-in motor and a tiny rechargeable battery

=== Other uses in arts, entertainment, and media ===
- Sizzler (Brookside), a character on the British television series Brookside
- The Sizzler, a fast-paced celebrity gossip segment on the show Best Week Ever

== Brands and enterprises ==
- Sizzler, a restaurant chain in the United States
- Sizzler International, a restaurant chain in Asia operated by Minor International
  - Sizzler Australia, a defunct restaurant chain formerly operated by Collins Foods Limited

== Technology ==
- Sizzler (percussion), an accessory attached to a conventional cymbal to give the effect of a sizzle cymbal
- Sizzler, the supersonic 3M-54E variant of the Russian 3M-54 Klub multi-role missile system
- Heuberger Sizzler, an American homebuilt aircraft design

== Other uses ==
- Sizzler (ride) and Deluxe Sizzler, amusement rides
- Sizzler (food), a term in India used for a type of restaurant or cuisine featuring western-style grilled meats and vegetables served on a hot iron plate (similar to the plate used for fajitas)
- Sizzler, various Midwestern basketball teams in the Continental Basketball Association
- Sizzler, a micro mini dress with matching panties popular in the 1970s, usually made of polyester
- Sizzlers massacre, took place in Sea Point, Cape Town on 20 January 2003, when Adam Woest and Trevor Basil murdered nine people and injured one person
