= China Cafe =

Traditional drinking house in Hong Kong

Coordinates: 22.319671°N 114.166921°E

China Cafe'
- Interactive map of China Cafe'

Restaurant information
- Established: 1964
- Closed: 2019
- Location: Hong Kong

China Cafe (Chinese: 中國冰室) was a bing sutt located at No.1077A Canton Road in Mong Kok, Kowloon, Hong Kong.

China Cafe opened in 1964. It closed on December 31, 2019.

China Cafe was the filming location of several Hong Kong TV shows and films, including PTU, Election, Fulltime Killer, C'est la vie, mon chéri, Once Upon a Time in Triad Society, Whispers and Moans, Tales from the Dark 1 and Anthony Bourdain: Parts Unknown.
