= Goods of Desire =

Hong Kong lifestyle design and retail brand

Goods of Desire (G.O.D.)
- GOD Logo from 1996 to present
- Native name: 住好啲
- Type: Private
- Industry: Design and retail
- Predecessor: G.O.D. Ltd
- Founded: October 1996; 29 years ago
- Founder: Douglas Young
- Headquarters: Hong Kong
- Number of locations: 5 in Hong Kong
- Area served: Hong Kong and internationally through online store
- Key people: Douglas Young (CEO)
- Products: Fashion, lifestyle and home accessories inspired by past and present Hong Kong and Asian culture
- Website: www.god.com.hk

Goods of Desire (Chinese: 住好啲; Cantonese Yale: jyu hou di) commonly known as G.O.D., is a lifestyle design and retail brand based in Hong Kong. Founded in 1996 by Douglas Young, the brand is known for its tongue-in-cheek interpretation of Hong Kong design and culture. The English name 'G.O.D.' is a homophonic translation of the Cantonese "住好啲" (jyu hou di), which roughly translates as "to live better".

In 2023, there are five store locations in Hong Kong. The company also sells products wholesale or brand-licensed to boutiques or department stores in cities such as London, Amsterdam, New York, Los Angeles, Sydney, Shanghai, Taiwan and Singapore.

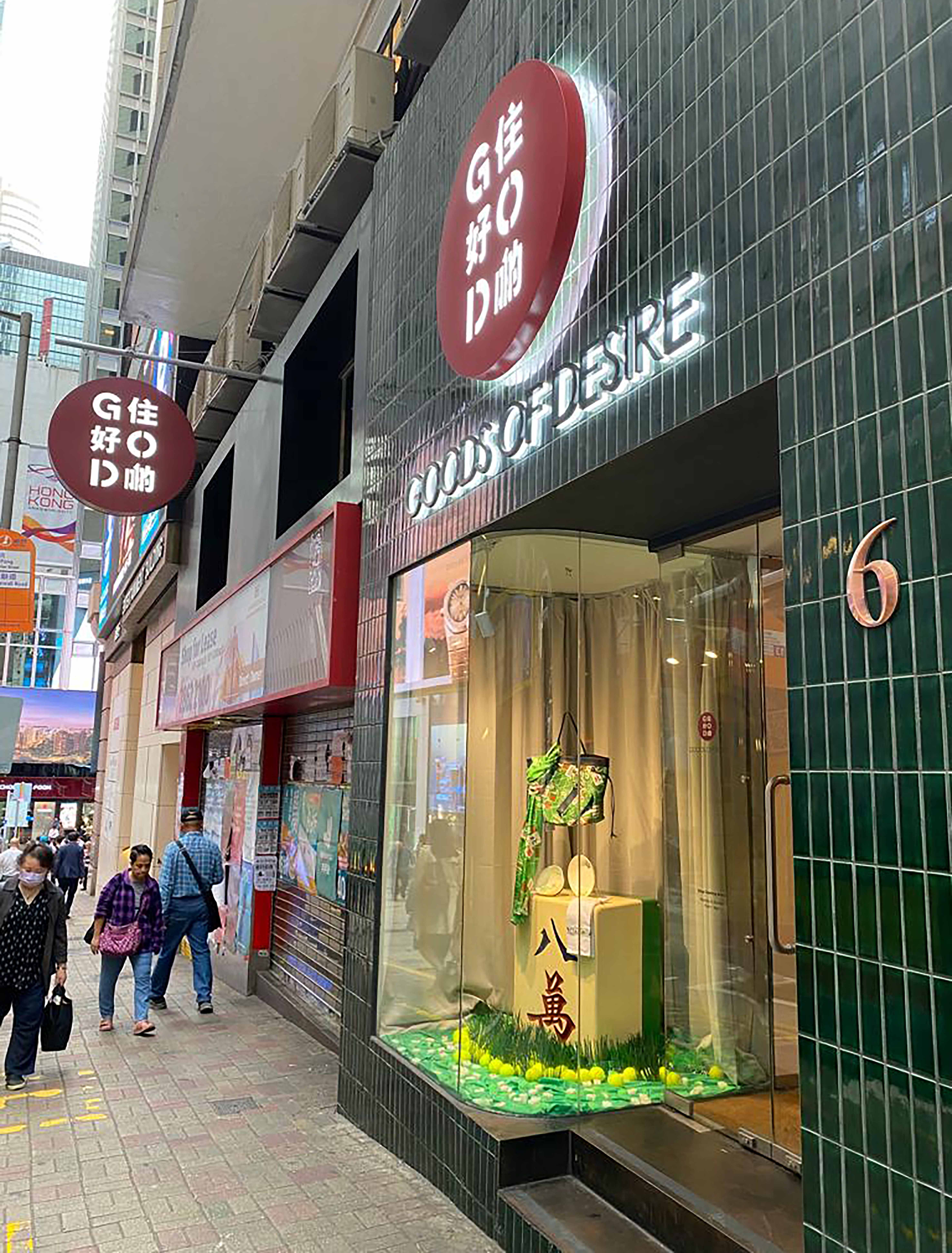
The brand new flagship store in the heart of Central near Lan Kwai Fong at 6 D'Aguilar Street, Central.

== History ==
An architect by training, founder Douglas Young wanted to do a lifestyle and home accessories store, with the aim of designing and manufacturing the products instead of shipping Chinese goods made in the West. He launched G.O.D. with the first store in an Ap Lei Chau warehouse (closed 2014) in 1996. Within two years, other locations followed, including on Hollywood Road in Central, Tsim Sha Tsui (closed 2012). The Hollywood Road store still exists today and is home to the famous Instagram mural done in collaboration with street artist, Alex Croft in 2012. In 2001, G.O.D. opened its 20,000 square foot flagship store at Leighton Centre (closed 2013) in Causeway Bay, as well as lifestyle mall 'Delay No Mall', also in Causeway Bay in 2008.

In 2008, the company introduced a 'Hong Kong Street Culture Gallery' at the Jockey Club Creative Arts Centre in Shek Kip Mei, Kowloon, also the location of their design studio and office. The studio remains at this location even though the gallery is closed. In 2009, G.O.D. opened at The Peak Galleria (closed 2015) and in Stanley Plaza and Sai Kung in 2011. In July 2012, they expanded overseas and opened a 6,000 square foot flagship store (closed 2015) in Singapore's historical riverside Clarke Quay. In 2014, G.O.D. became an anchor tenant in PMQ (closed 2020), the historic heritage building turned creative hub in Soho and in the same year, it returned to Causeway Bay (closed end of 2019).

In 2015, G.O.D. expanded in Asia once again by opening three stores in Taiwan (closed 2017) and two pop-up stores in Hong Kong - one at the Hong Kong International Airport in the Departures Hall and the other in Lab Concept (closed 2020) in Admiralty . In the beginning of 2016, G.O.D. opened a store in the MH Mall in Shenzhen, China (closed 2019). G.O.D. opened their second Hong Kong International Airport store in 2018 along with a store in the Hong Kong station (near Exit E / Tung Chung MTR line).

G.O.D. opened a flagship store in Central near Lan Kwai Fong at 6 D'Aguilar Street.

== Concept ==
Taking inspiration from both the condensed urban centres and rural environments of Asia, G.O.D. is influenced by the concept of the eastern lifestyle as an alternative to the western way of living. The idea of such a cultural contradiction is especially prevalent in a city like Hong Kong, a city that boasts a modernised way of life combined with traditional Chinese practices. Young wanted to build a brand based on traditional images of Hong Kong and believes that "the most successful brands tend to incorporate national identity. Not many Hong Kong brands actually feel very Hong Kong. I want to do something different: to give ourselves some pride and some respect. Some of our signature items have a quirky Hong Kong feel – they are unmistakable."

Young also said in an interview with Hong Kong Trade Development Council that "I'm trying to push Hong Kong traditions, to make the ordinary and mundane into something extraordinary. When I hear people saying 'wow' about my products, it's great because it shows Hong Kong's flexibility." The intention is to provide 'something desirable' that the customers 'have not even imagined before'.

== Products ==
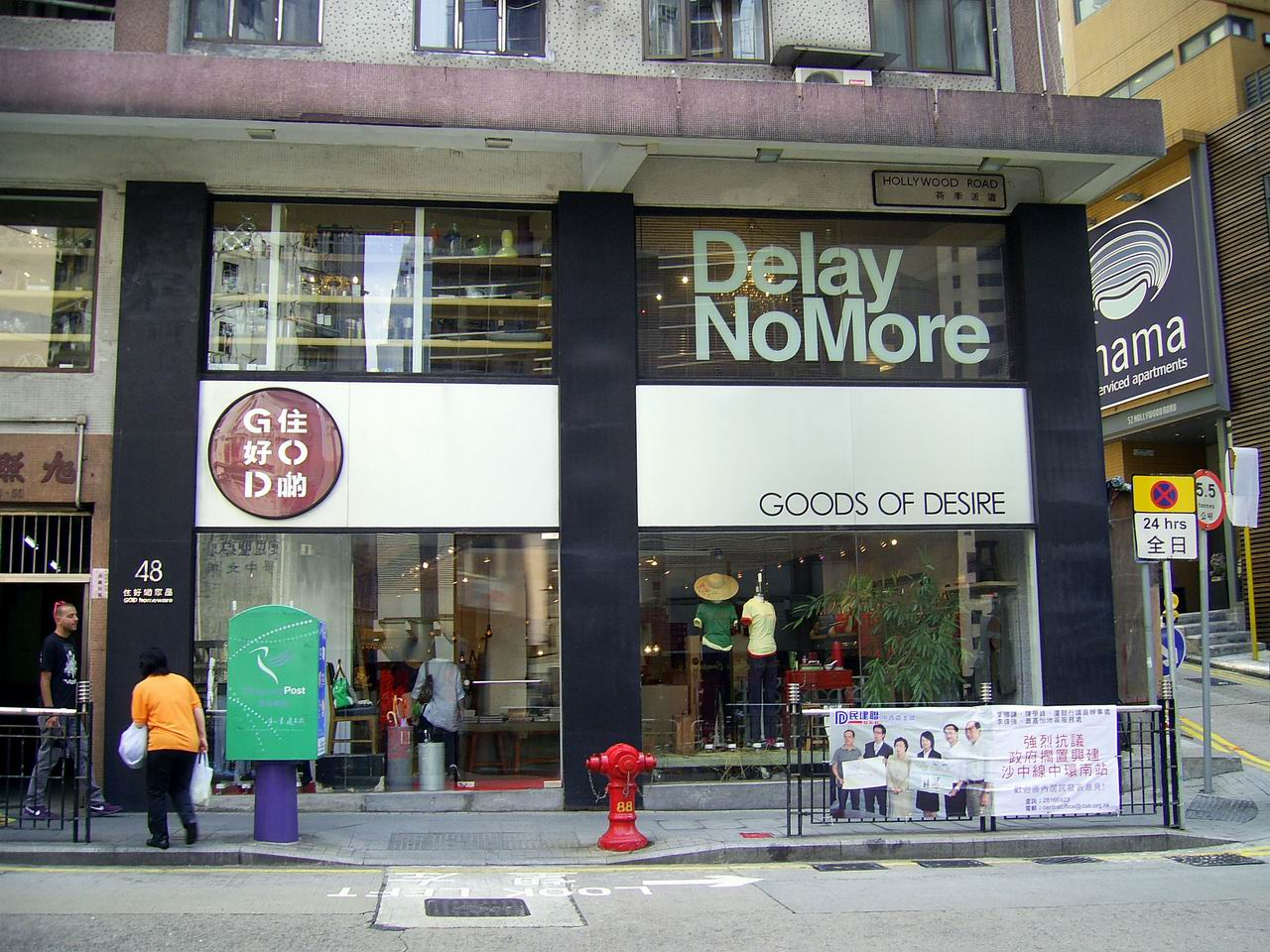
G.O.D. shop on Hollywood Road Hong Kong, with the "Delay No More" slogan, in 2008

G.O.D.'s core range of lifestyle products are designed in-house, and their product range consists mostly of fashion, home accessories and premium gifts. The designs and prints are inspired by old and new aspects of Hong Kong culture, including products themed with Chinese "Double Happiness" characters, newspaper classifieds, retro local product packaging, 1950s advertisements, old letter boxes. Such products includes "Bishop" and "Rook" bean bags, inspired by Chinese chess and pencil case in the design of old-school Chinese ballet flats.

In 2003, the company introduced its trademark slogan, "Delay No More". The phrase is a homophonic translation of the Cantonese profanity díu néih lóuh móuh (屌你老母) "fuck your mother", but in English it is a call to action; and it is emblazoned on T-shirts and other products.

== Crossover projects ==
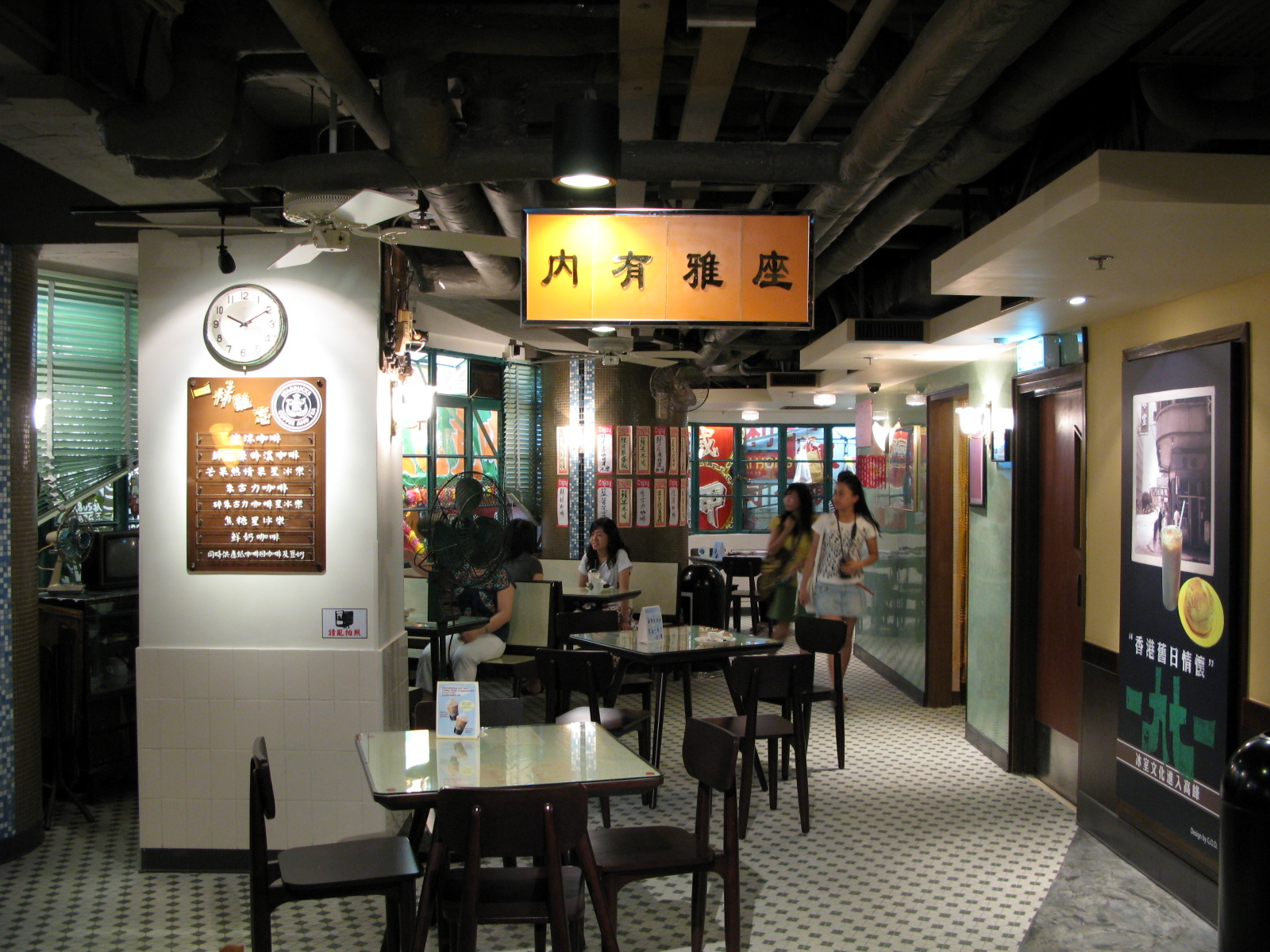
"Bing Sutt Corner" at Starbucks on Duddell Street in 2009

Starbucks

In June 2009, G.O.D. collaborated with Starbucks to create a store with a "Bing Sutt Corner" at their outlet on Duddell Street in Central. It is a concept that fuses the retro Bing Sutt, a Hong Kong teahouse, style with the contemporary look of a coffeehouse. The coffee company states that, "This very unique Starbucks store has been built as a collaborative project with the quintessential Hong Kong brand G.O.D. (Goods of Desire). It is a celebration of Hong Kong's roots and spirit".

Rugby Sevens

For the 2012 Hong Kong Sevens, G.O.D. teamed up with sportswear brand Kukri Sports to produce merchandising for the tournament. The products, carried the specially designed "Kukri x G.O.D." logo, which featured elements of the original Hong Kong flag, and ranged from polo shirts, traditional Chinese jackets, boxers, Cheongsam-inspired ladies polo, messenger and tote bags. A percentage of sales went to the Foodlink Foundation, supported by both companies.

Cathay Pacific

Starting in October 2012, Hong Kong airline Cathay Pacific introduced a new range of amenity kits for Premium economy passengers, designed by G.O.D. The kits were designed as collectible with each bag being able to hook onto each other to form a wall-hanging accessory. The first two available were 'Joy' and 'Fortune', with designs that depict Chinese gods relaxing in-flight and of auspicious clouds respectively. They include 90% recycled plastic bottles and toothbrush made mainly from biodegradable corn starch and cellulose. Since then, G.O.D. has designed two bags every six months for the Cathay Pacific.

Maxim's

From 2009 to 2014, G.O.D. collaborated with powerhouse Hong Kong bakery, Maxim's, to design mooncakes for the Chinese Mid-autumn festival. They came up with presenting the traditional treats in the shape of bottoms in eight different designs, but still filled with traditional white lotus seed paste and salted yolks.

In 2013, G.O.D. debuted the popular Mahjong Box Pineapple Cake Gift Box, which sold out within days of its release. The gift box was jointly created by Goods of Desire and Mei-Xin Fine Goods in Hong Kong.

== Exhibition ==
In September 2012, the brand in co-operation with Sino Art, held The Street Market Symphony Exhibition at Olympian City, their first solo art exhibition in a shopping mall. The exhibition used multi-media installations housed in large red lampshades, the iconic representation of Hong Kong's wet markets.

From 2010 to 2014, Young and G.O.D. designed the Club Lounge at Art HK followed by its successor, Art Basel Hong Kong, highlighting the icons of Hong Kong culture. The first year featured the Copper Towers

== Controversy ==
In 2007, Young and seventeen employees were taken in by police for selling T-shirts bearing the logo '14K', the name of one of the city's triad crime syndicates. "Police claimed the shop had broken a section of an 1845 anti-triad law called the Societies Ordinance, which allows for the arrest of any person in possession of 'any books, accounts, writing, lists of members, seals, banners or insignia of or relating to any triad society.' Triad members still often carry such insignia – usually worn on the backs of shirts – that they show to shopkeepers in exchange for protection money."

Authorities "confiscated 88 shirts and more than 500 postcards printed with a '14K' logo – with the numbers written in Chinese characters – from the store's five offices and warehouse located in Central, Causeway Bay, Tsim Sha Tsui and Yuen Long." Young states that "[It] was all a misunderstanding and the shirts were actually referring to 14 karat gold". The 18 employees, including Young, were released the next day, and "their 14K T-shirts, are now collector's items", according to CNN Travel.
