= William Thomas Sugg =

British gas lighter

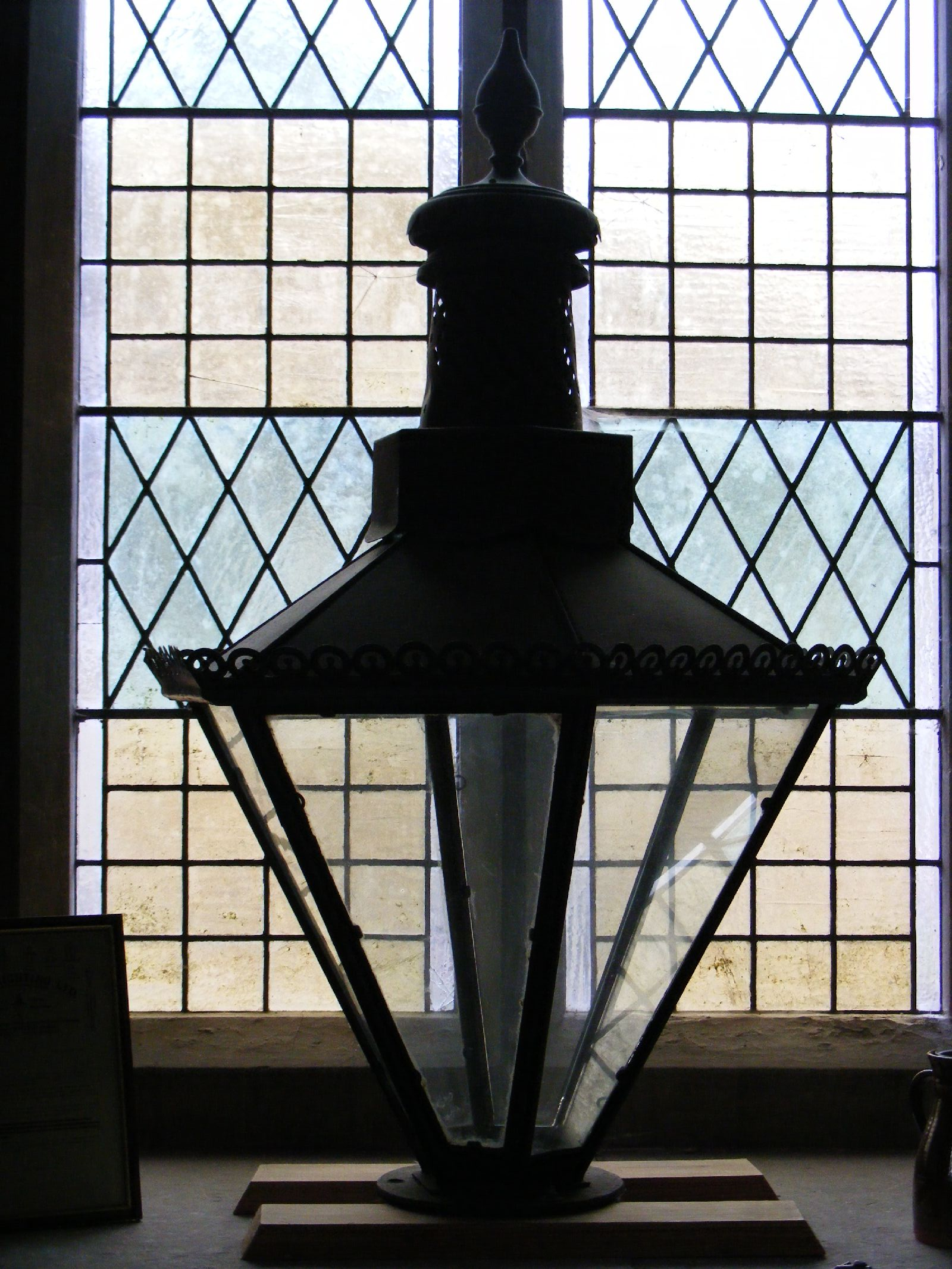
A circa 1906 Sugg gas lamp

William Thomas Sugg (1833 – 28 February 1907) was a British gas lighting engineer. He was trained from 1851 by his father, who had founded William Sugg and Company as a gas lighting firm in 1837. After his father's 1860 death Sugg took over the family firm. He had success in producing Christiana gas lights and a gas-powered version of the Argand lamp. Sugg also produced gas-powered stoves, fires and photometers. Under him William Sugg and Company became the most important manufacturer of gaslights in the world.

== Biography ==
Tower Bridge

Sugg was born in 1833. His father, also William Sugg, was a gas engineer and had, in 1837, founded William Sugg and Company. Sugg trained with his father from 1851 and took over the business upon his father's death in 1860. Under the younger Sugg the company grew to become the most important manufacturer of gaslights in the world. He developed his father's small firm into a large limited liability company. Sugg remained at the head of the firm and was actively involved in its running until his death.

Sugg had a significant influence in the field of gas lighting for 50 years. His Christiana gaslight came in for particular praise. He also produced regenerative burners, incandescent gas lights, gas cooking stoves and gas fires. Sugg developed photometers which were used to check the quality of gas supplies, in accordance with statutory law. Sugg's version of a gas-powered Argand lamp was widely used in London and was chosen as the standard burner for gas-supply testing by the London Gas Referees. It was Sugg's firm that installed the lighting, some 200 lamps, for London's Tower Bridge (completed 1894).

Sugg was a member of the British Association of Gas Managers, the Gas Institute and the Institution of Gas Engineers and contributed prolifically to their journals. He was awarded a Telford Premium by the Institution of Gas Engineers for a 1876 paper on estimating the illumination power of coal gas. He was elected an associate member of the Institution of Civil Engineers on 6 May 1862. Sugg died on 28 February 1907 at Morningside in Clapham Park.
