= Bing sutt =

Type of traditional cold drinking house

Bing sutt (Chinese: 冰室; Jyutping: bing1 sat1; lit. 'ice room') is a type of traditional cold-drink house which originated in Guangzhou, China, and spread to neighbouring Hong Kong in the 1950s and '60s. They are characterised by their colonial décor in the form of old furniture, small tiled floors, hanging fans, and folding chairs. Bing sutts provide light meals and drinks, and play the role of neighbourhood hubs. They are believed to be the predecessor of the cha chaan teng.

The initial concept of the Hong Kong bing sutt was to imitate a high-end western restaurant offering cheap western-style light meals to cater to the needs of the working class.

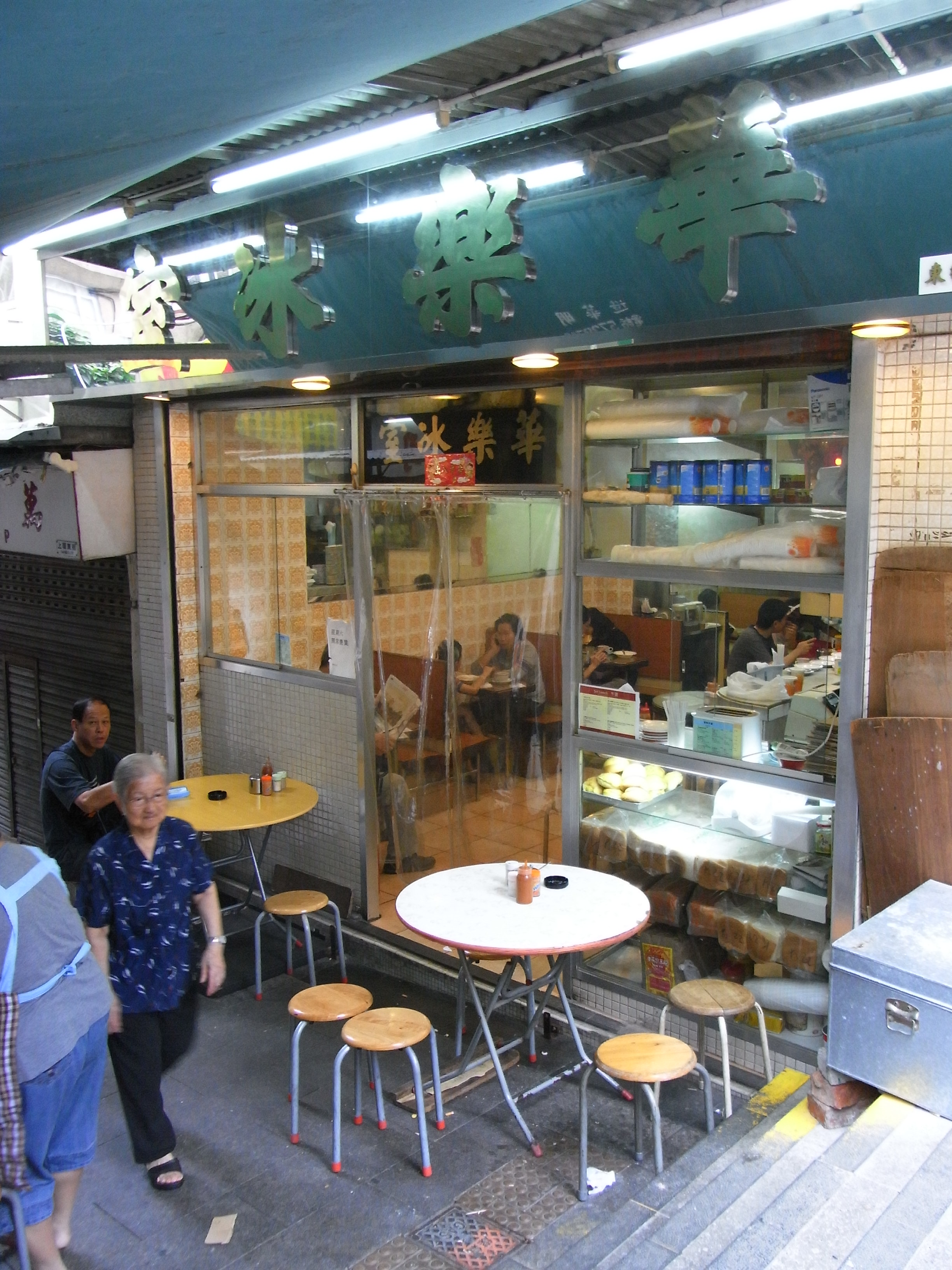
Wah Lok Cafe located in Central, Hong Kong

== History ==
Since the conclusion of World War II, the dietary culture of Hong Kong became increasingly westernised. It was during this time that bing sutts started to become popular, and created western-influenced menus to keep Hong Kong-style restaurants alive. Bing sutts hit the height of their popularity in the 1950s and '60s.

Traditional bing sutts only provided cold drinks alongside light, western-style meals. By keeping their prices low, they became popular with people from all social strata. But with the development of cha chaan tengs, fast food chains, and coffee shops, which sell a larger variety of food, bing sutts became less competitive. In the 1980s, many had no choice but to refine the traditional menus by adding the oriental staples of rice and noodles in order to increase their competitiveness.

In the 1980s, the cold drink market in Guangzhou ushered in a large number of new frozen foods. These new inventions helped bing sutts regain their popularity. In the 1990s, most bing sutts served mainly tong sui, milk, coconut milk, tortoise jelly, and other sorts of desserts. Others served dishes such as fried dumplings, soup, glutinous rice, fast food lunch boxes, and congee. In the summer, a small number of bing sutts would also serve ice cream. In Guangzhou, bing sutts became a large part of people's lives. Gradually there emerged the “Four Great Bing Sutts” in the shape of the Shun Kee Bing Sutt, Mei Lei Kyun Bing Sutt, Sunshine Bing Sutt, and Emperor Bing Sutt. As of today, only the Shun Kee Bing Sutt still exists. The Mei Lei Kyun Bing Sutt was incoporated into the Tai Ping Koon Restaurant.

With only a few dozen traditional bing sutts still operating in the 21st century, the younger generation have become fascinated with the nostalgic atmosphere of these traditional Hong Kong establishments. Aware of their desire to relive the days of colonial Hong Kong, several fast food chains have created unique concept stores in the style of the traditional bing sutt to attract this new generation of customer.

== Foods and drinks ==
=== Drinks ===
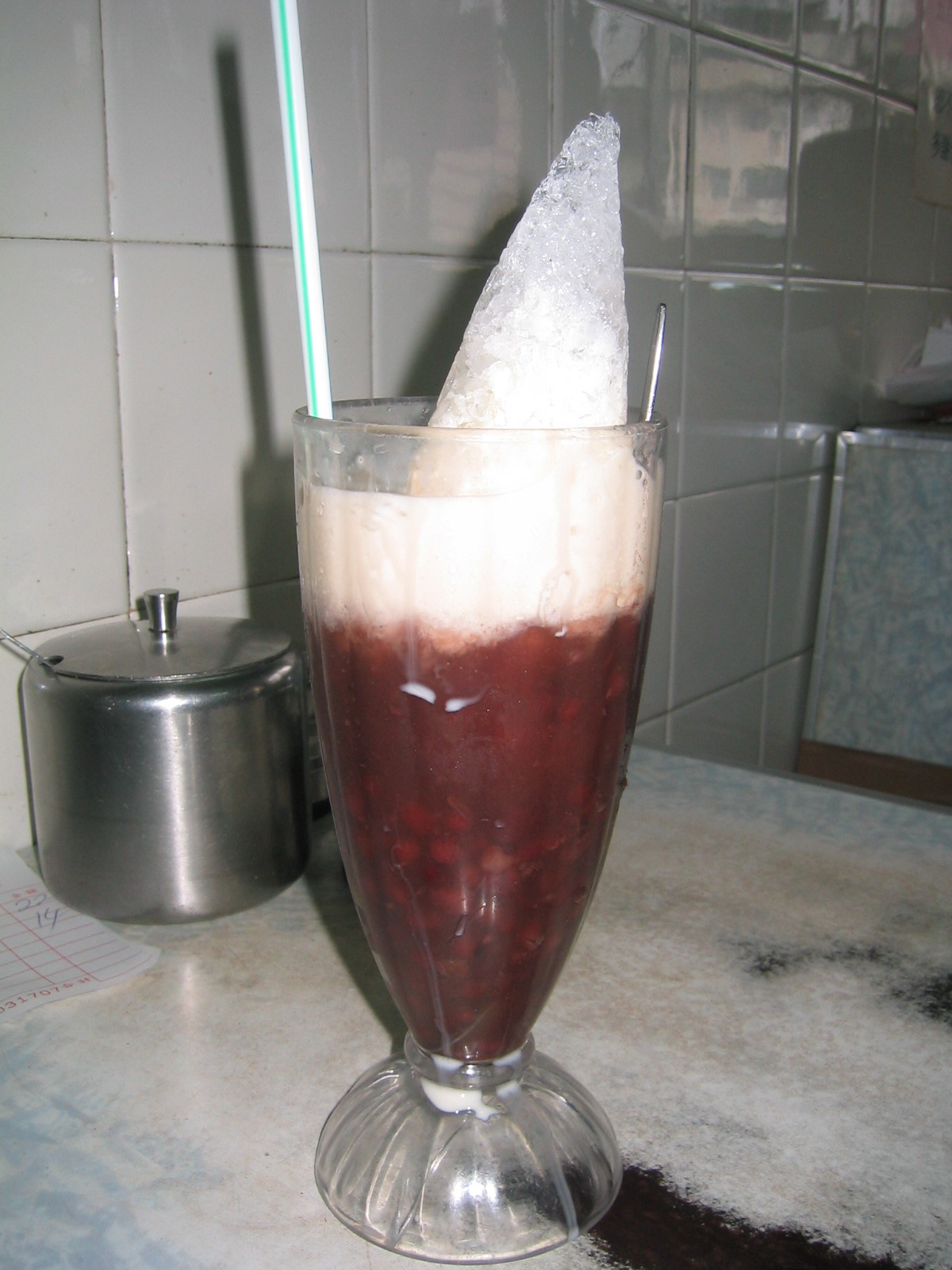
Red bean ice is traditionally served with a large shard of ice in the glass

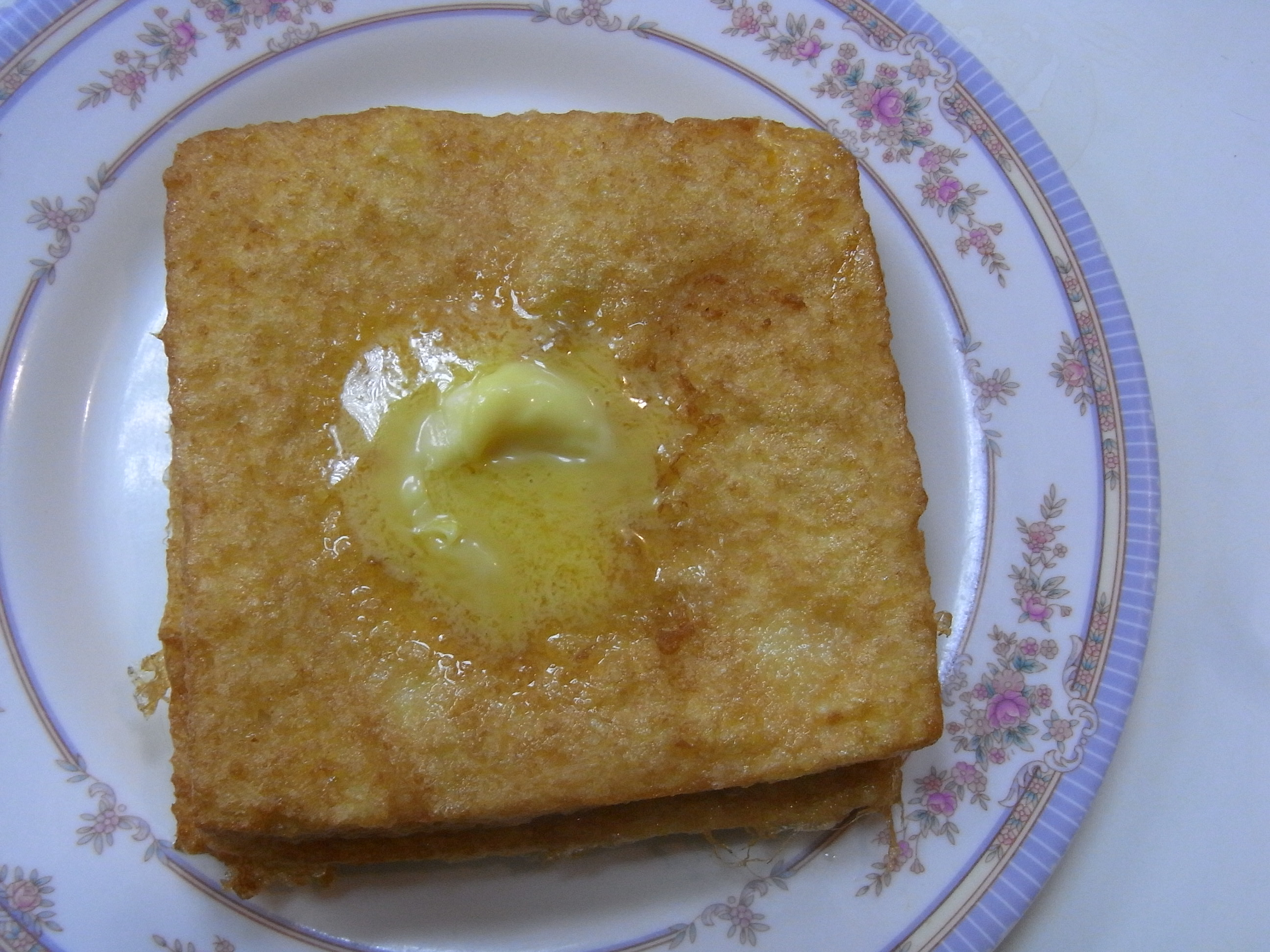
French toast is very popular in bing sutts, and is usually served with butter and syrup, as per the photograph

- Red bean ice (a drink mixed with red beans, light rock sugar syrup, and evaporated milk)
- Yuen yeung (a mixture of coffee and tea)
- Coffee (either instant or in powder form)
- Fruit punch
- Hong Kong-style milk tea (black tea mixed with evaporated milk or condensed milk)
- Ovaltine

=== Pastries ===
- Hong Kong style swiss roll (standard cake layer with whipped cream)
- Paper wrapped cake (chiffon cake baked in a paper cup)
- Croissant
- Pineapple bun with butter
- Egg tart

=== Toast and sandwiches ===
- Toast with butter
- Sandwiches
- French toast (called “Western Toast” in Chinese; a transliteration of French toast)
- French toast with shrimp

=== Other dishes ===
- Ham and macaroni served with fried egg and sausage
- Chicken wings in Swiss sauce
- Instant noodles
- Rice (served with sauce)

== See also ==
- Cantonese restaurant
- Dai pai dong
- Cha chaan teng buffet
- Hong Kong cuisine
- Capital Cafe
- China Cafe, a former bing sutt in Mong Kok
