= Sizzler (food) =

Dish to cook and keep food hot

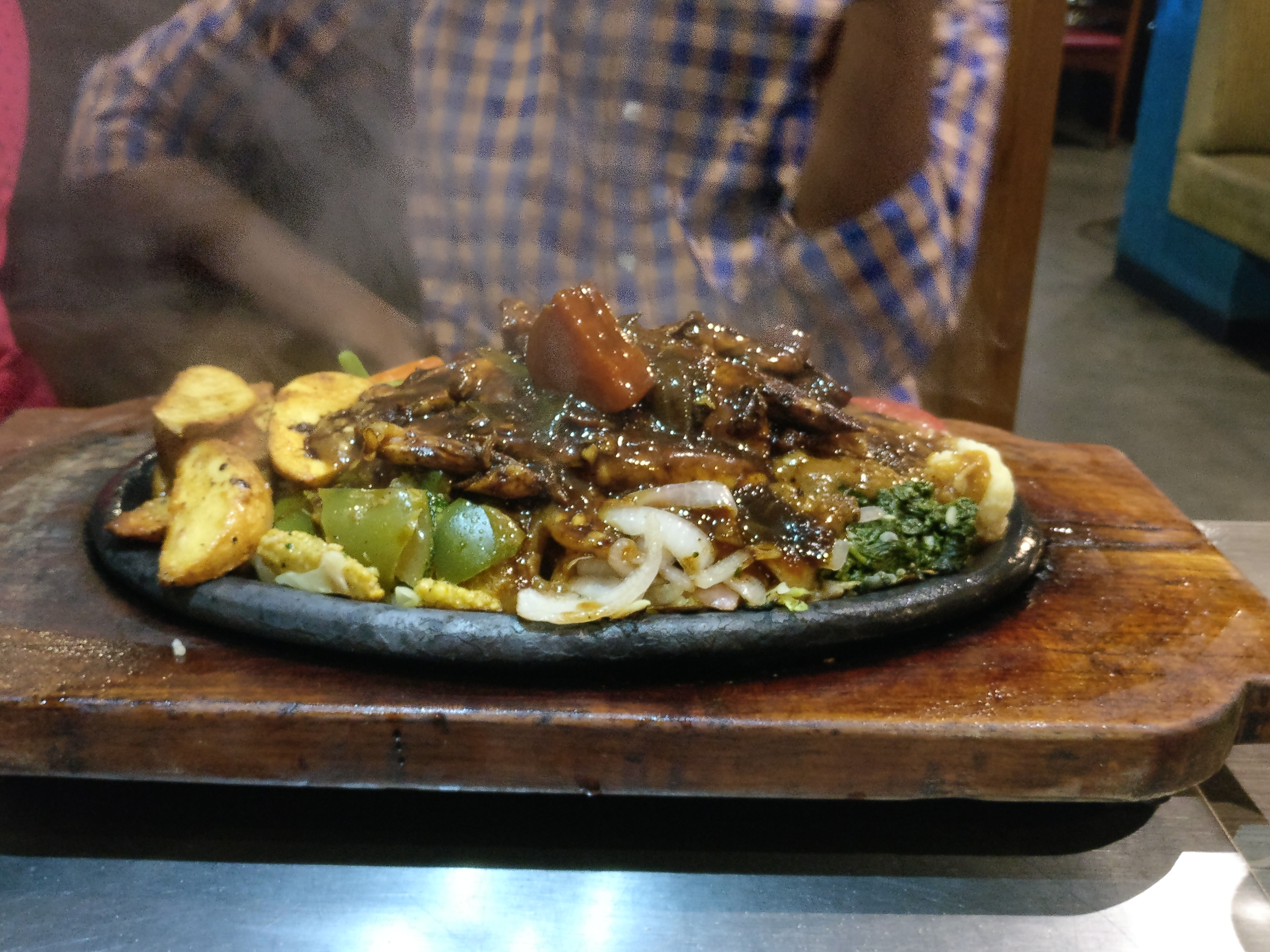

A sizzler is a medley dish invented in Mumbai. It is cooked and served on a hot metal plate that is placed on a wooden holder when taken to the customer's table. The dish is inspired by the Japanese Teppanyaki, in which vegetables and meat are cooked on a very hot metal griddle, to keep the inside soft and moist, and make the outside crunchy.

== History ==
The Indian sizzler was invented by Firoz Erani in Mumbai in 1963, and his restaurant near Excelsior cinema was called "Sizzler". He was inspired by an American version of Japanese Teppanyaki at a restaurant called Sizzler which he visited in California. Firoz's second wife Tachiko was Japanese. In 1967, they shut down their restaurant "Sizzler" and moved to the Isle of Man. Firoz's son Shahrookh Erani continued the tradition of serving sizzlers, and opened "Touche" on Warden Road in the same year. In 1971, he moved to Pune where he started a new restaurant "The Place: Touche". The restaurant is still popular today, is managed by Farida Vachha, and carries the mantle of being the original sizzler restaurant of India.

In 1975, a businessman called Vazir Rizvi started his own restaurant (and later chain) called "Kobe Sizzlers" in Mumbai. Other restaurants such as Yoko Sizzlers and Fountain Sizzlers soon followed suit in Mumbai, and Zamu's and Yana in Pune. Most large cities in India now have restaurants that specialise in sizzlers, and some of the iconic sizzler restaurant chains have branches in the UAE.

== Description ==
A sizzler is essentially a single dish meal, in which meats and vegetables are cooked in a sauce on a hot metal plate. The dish has been described as an "open-roasted, grilled or shallow fried piece of meat, chicken, fish or vegetable patty, served on an oval shaped metal or stone hot plate, kept on a wooden base. The word "sizzler" comes from the sizzle that one hears after heating the dish under a grill. The metal plate is heated to the point right before service, that when the finished steak is placed on it, it sizzles and the smoky flavour makes the dish more enticing." In terms of preparation, the equipment and method for all sizzlers is the same, despite the large variety of ingredients and sauces.
