= Yuenyeung =

Drink made with coffee and milk tea

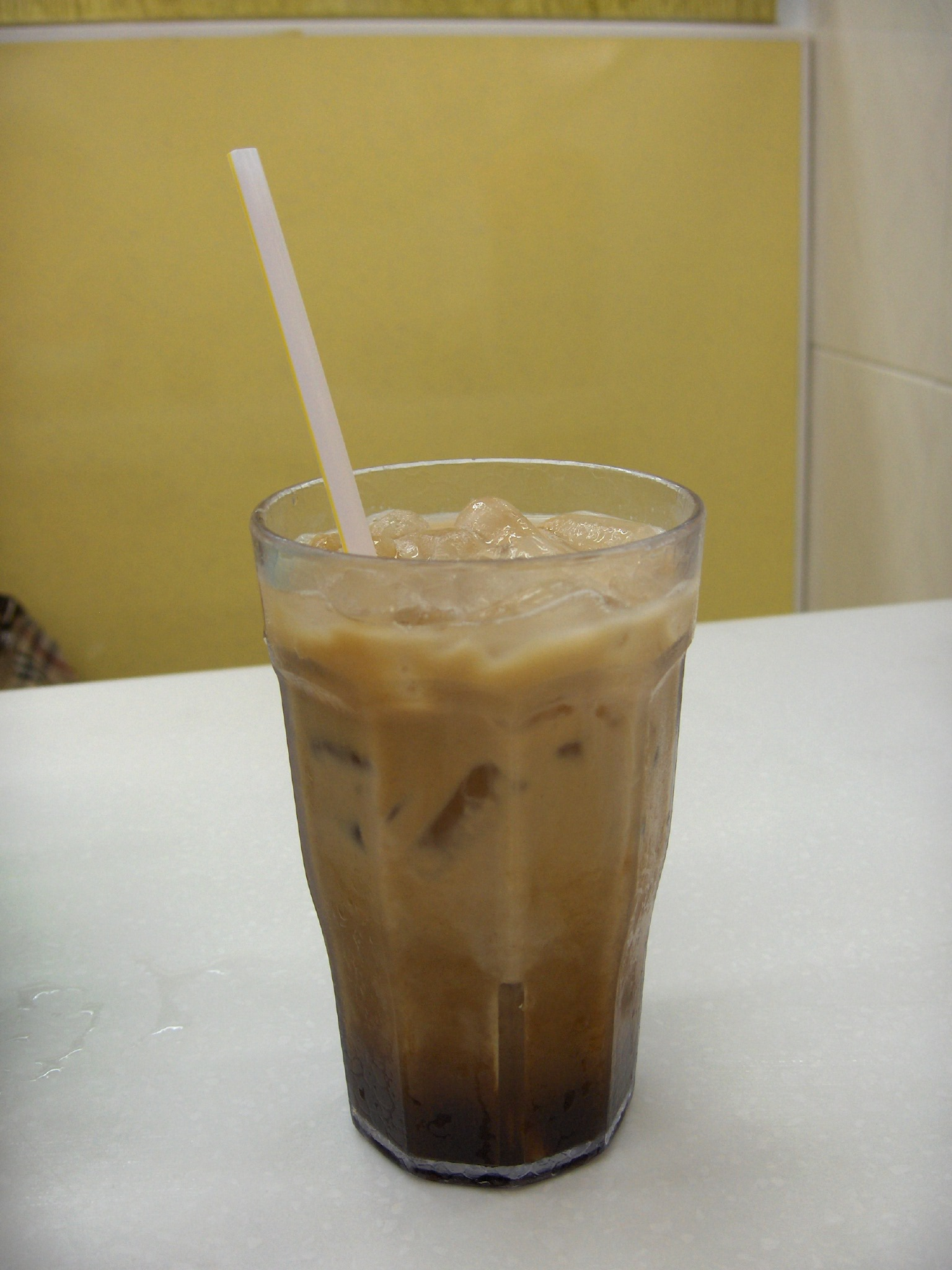
- Iced yuenyeung at a cha chaan teng in Hong Kong (2007)
- Course: Drink
- Place of origin: Hong Kong
- Serving temperature: Hot or iced
- Main ingredients: Brewed coffee, Hong Kong-style milk tea (black tea, evaporated or condensed milk), sugar

Yuenyeung
- Traditional Chinese: 鴛鴦
- Simplified Chinese: 鸳鸯
- Hanyu Pinyin: Yuānyāng
- Cantonese Yale: Yūnyēung
Transcriptions
Standard Mandarin
- Hanyu Pinyin: Yuānyāng
- Bopomofo: ㄩㄢ ㄧㄤ
- IPA: [ɥɛ́n jáŋ]
Wu
- Wugniu: ioe^{1} ian^{1}
- IPA: Shanghainese: [iø˥ iã˨˩]
Yue: Cantonese
- Yale Romanization: Yūnyēung
- Jyutping: jyun^{1} joeng^{1}
- Sidney Lau: Yuen^{1°}yeung^{1°}
- Canton Romanization: Yun1yêng1
- IPA: [jyn˥ jœŋ˥]
Southern Min
- Hokkien POJ: oan-iuⁿ

Yuenyeung (Chinese: 鴛鴦, often transliterated according to the Cantonese language pronunciation yuenyeung, yinyeung, or yinyong; yuānyāng in Mandarin) is a drink created by mixing coffee with milk tea. It originated in Hong Kong at dai pai dong (open-air food vendors) and cha chaan teng (cafés), but is now available in various types of restaurants.

The exact method of creating yuenyeung varies by vendor and region, but it generally consists of brewed coffee and black tea with sugar and milk. According to the Hong Kong Leisure and Cultural Services Department, the mixture is three parts coffee and seven parts Hong Kong–style milk tea. It can be served hot or cold.

== Etymology ==
The name yuenyeung refers to mandarin ducks (yuanyang), which is a symbol of conjugal love in Chinese culture, as the birds usually appear in pairs and the male and female look very different. This same connotation of a "pair" of two unlike items is used to name this drink.

== Origin ==
A dai pai dong–style restaurant in Hong Kong named Lan Fong Yuen (蘭芳園) claims that both yuenyeung and silk-stocking milk tea were invented in 1952 by its owner, Lum Muk-ho. Its claim for yuenyeung is unverified, but that for silk-stocking milk tea is generally supported.

== Adoption ==
In summer 2010, Starbucks stores in Hong Kong and Macau promoted a frappuccino version of the drink. It was sold as the "Yuen Yeung Frappuccino Blended Cream".

The drink is also common in Malaysia, where it is known as Kopi cham (from Malay kopi ('coffee') and Hokkien chham (攙; 'mix')).

== Children's yuenyeung ==
There is a caffeine-free variant of yuenyeung, called children's yuenyeung (兒童鴛鴦). It is made using Horlicks and Ovaltine, malted milk drink mixes that are common in Hong Kong cha chaan tengs (cafés).

== See also ==
- List of coffee beverages
- Yuenyeung fried rice
