= Hong Kong–style milk tea =

Beverage made of Ceylon tea, black tea, and milk

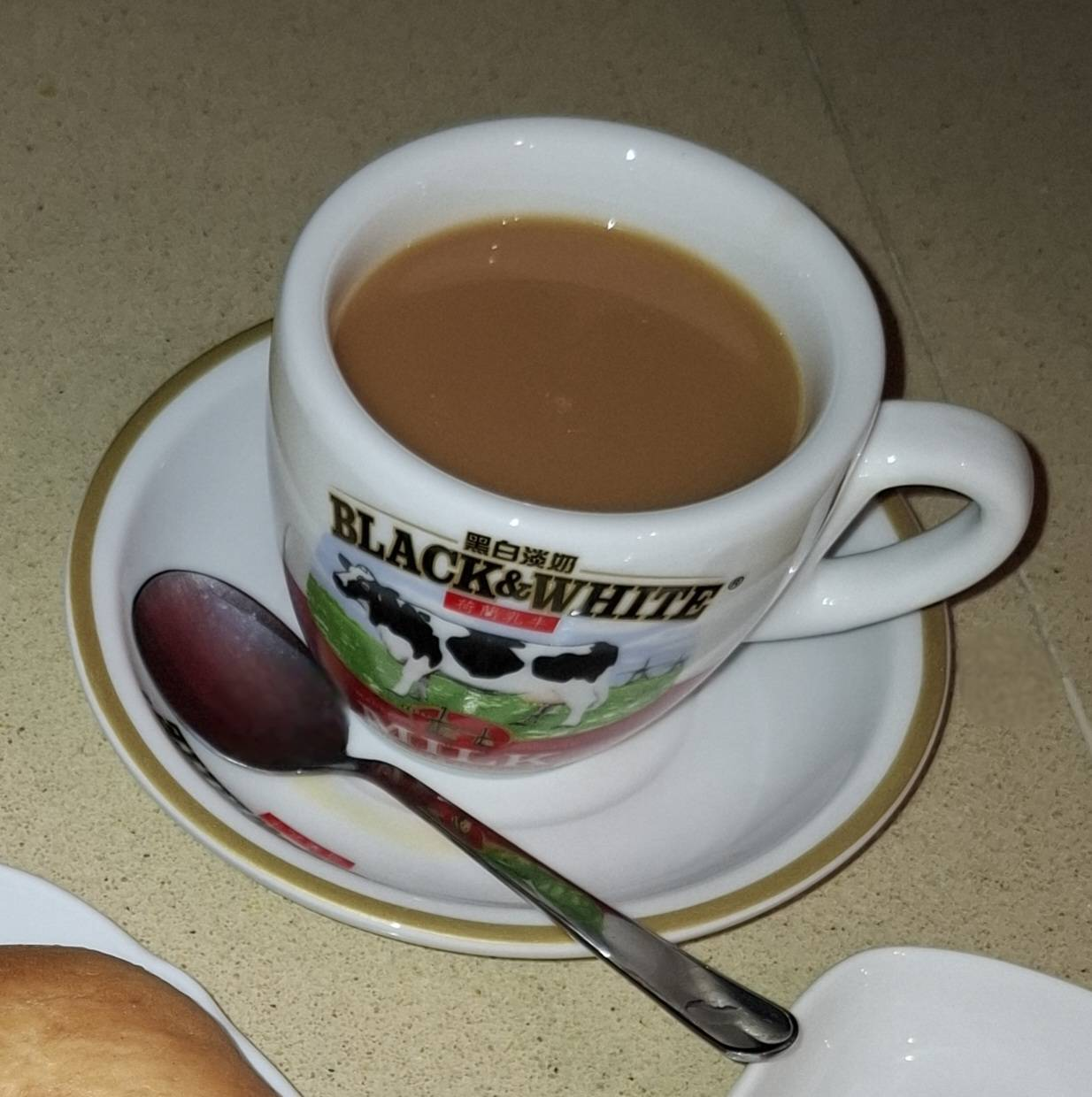
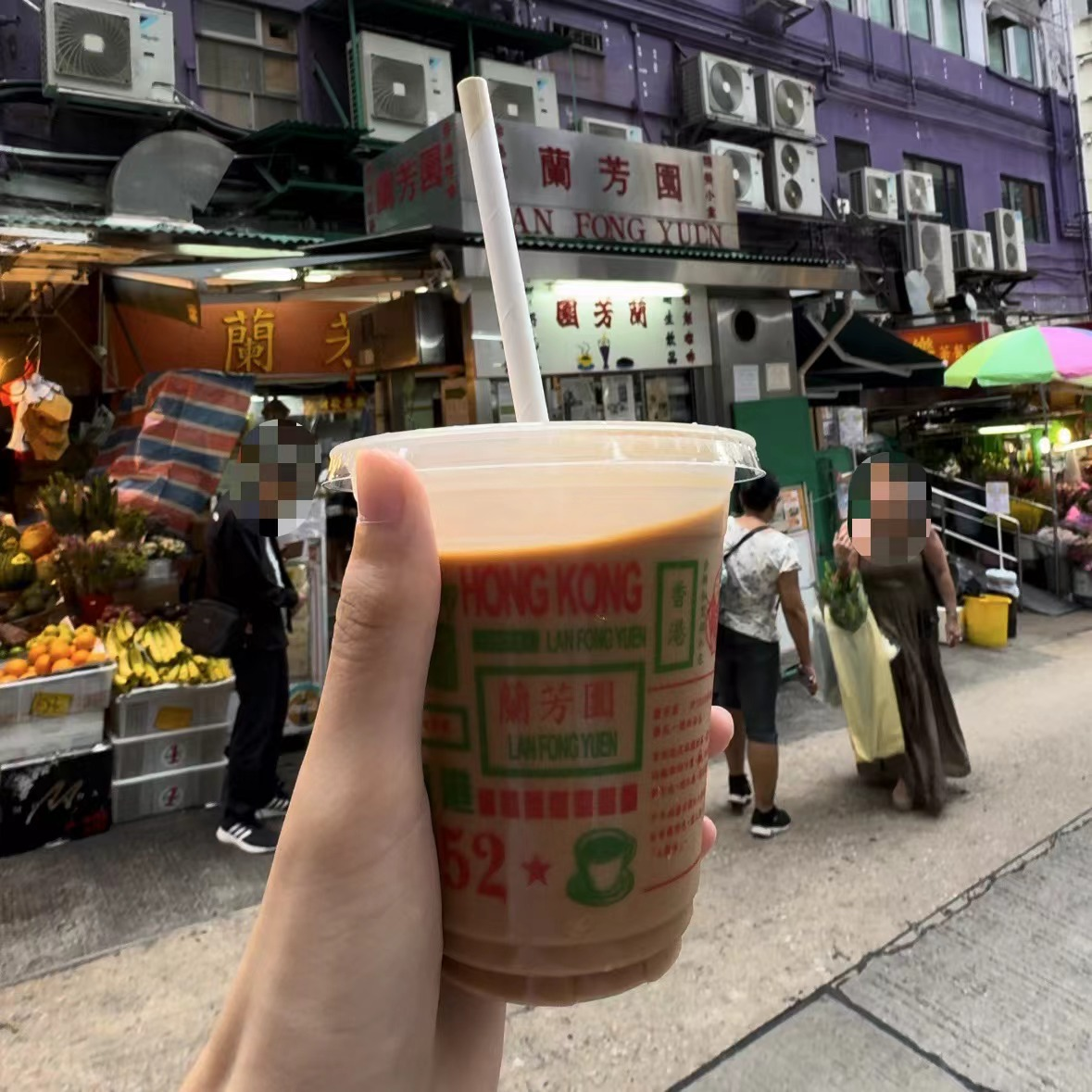
- Top: Milk Tea as served in cha chaan tengs across the city, the Black&White-branded teacup is a famous symbol of the city Bottom: Cup of Hong Kong–style milk tea by Lan Fong Yuen, a dai pai dong that invented the drink
- Course: Drink
- Place of origin: Hong Kong
- Serving temperature: Hot or cold
- Main ingredients: Ceylon tea, evaporated milk or condensed milk, sugar
- Similar dishes: Doodh pati chai; Burmese milk tea; Teh tarik

Hong Kong–style milk tea
- Chinese: 港式奶茶
- Cantonese Yale: Góngsīk náaihchà
- Literal meaning: Hong Kong–style milk tea
Transcriptions
Standard Mandarin
- Hanyu Pinyin: Gǎng shì nǎichá
Yue: Cantonese
- Yale Romanization: Góngsīk náaihchà
- Jyutping: Gong2sik1 naai5caa4

Alternative Chinese name
- Chinese: 香港奶茶
- Cantonese Yale: Hēunggóng náaihchà
- Literal meaning: Hong Kong milk tea
Transcriptions
Standard Mandarin
- Hanyu Pinyin: Xiānggǎng nǎichá
Yue: Cantonese
- Yale Romanization: Hēunggóng náaihchà
- Jyutping: Hoeng1gong2 naai5caa4

Second alternative Chinese name
- Traditional Chinese: 大排檔奶茶
- Simplified Chinese: 大排档奶茶
- Cantonese Yale: Daaihpàaidong náaihchà
- Literal meaning: dai pai dong milk tea
Transcriptions
Standard Mandarin
- Hanyu Pinyin: Dàpáidàng nǎichá
Yue: Cantonese
- Yale Romanization: Daaihpàaidong náaihchà
- Jyutping: Daai6paai4dong3 naai5caa4

Hong Kong–style milk tea (Chinese: 港式奶茶), also known as "silk-stocking" milk tea (絲襪奶茶), is a tea drink made from Ceylon black tea and evaporated milk (or condensed milk). The drink originated in the mid-20th century during the British rule of Hong Kong, and was inspired by British afternoon tea.

The Hong Kong variant uses a stronger blend of tea leaves, which traditionally is brewed using a unique technique that features a stocking-like cotton bag. These, along with the use of evaporated milk instead of fresh milk, results in a more intense and creamy flavour, differing from the light and diluted taste of British milk tea.

The unique technique used to prepare Hong Kong–style milk tea is recognised by the Hong Kong government as an intangible cultural heritage of the city. Since the 1990s, the drink has increasingly become a symbol of the Hong Kong identity and the territory's culture, with industry estimates suggesting that Hongkongers consume an average of 2.5 millions cups of the drink every day. Amid the city's mass emigration wave in the early 2020s, this variant of milk tea can now also be found overseas in Hong Kong–style restaurants.

== Naming ==
Hong Kong–style milk tea is called "milk tea" (Chinese: 奶茶; Cantonese Yale: náaihchà) to distinguish it from "Chinese tea" (Chinese: 茶; Cantonese Yale: chà), which is served plain without milk. It may also be referred to as "Hong Kong–style milk tea" (Chinese: 港式奶茶) to distinguish it from other types of milk tea popular in Hong Kong, such as Taiwanese bubble tea. The drink is also sometimes nicknamed "silk stocking" milk tea (Chinese: 絲襪奶茶; Cantonese Yale: sī maht náaihchà), as the cloth bag traditionally used during the brewing process resembles women's stockings.

== History ==
Hong Kong–style milk tea originates from the British colonial rule over Hong Kong. The British practice of afternoon tea, where black tea is served with fresh milk and sugar, grew popular in the colony. However, this was only served in hotels or high-end Western restaurants, and thus were out of locals' reach. This prompted local diners, like bing sutt and dai pai dong, to localise the British ingredients and create an affordable variant suited to Hongkongers' palates. This included substituting regular milk for evaporated milk, which was cheaper, easier to store, and more concentrated.

A dai pai dong–style restaurant called Lan Fong Yuen (蘭芳園) claims that both "silk-stocking" milk tea and yuenyeung were invented in 1952 by its owner, Lum Muk-ho. Its claim for yuenyeung is unverified, but that for silk-stocking milk tea is generally supported.

In its early days, Hong Kong–style milk tea used a much stronger blend of tea leaves and had an extremely strong flavour. This was marketed towards the city's many labourers in the 1940s, who desired a high caffeine content to "replenish their energy". A few decades later in the 1960s, the drink became more widely available at cha chaan teng and thus began to also appeal to office workers, who opted for a less intense tea. This eventually transformed the drink into its current state, which is still stronger and creamier than the lighter British milk tea.

== Preparation ==
"Silk stocking" milk tea
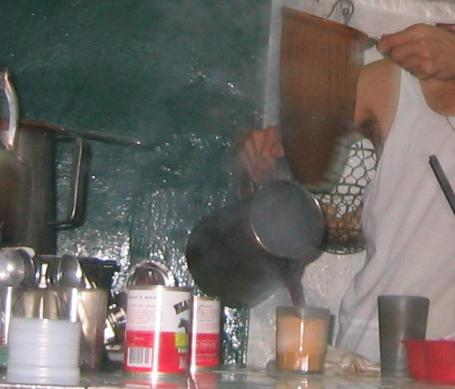
- Making milk tea with a "silk stocking"
- Traditional Chinese: 絲襪奶茶
- Cantonese Yale: sī maht náaihchà
- Literal meaning: silk-stocking milk tea
Transcriptions
Yue: Cantonese
- Yale Romanization: sī maht náaihchà
- Jyutping: si1mat6 naai5chaa4
- IPA: [síː mɐ̀t na̬ːi tsʰȁː]

=== Ingredients ===
Cha jau
- Traditional Chinese: 茶走
- Simplified Chinese: 茶走
- Literal meaning: tea without [evaporated milk]
Transcriptions
Standard Mandarin
- Hanyu Pinyin: chá zǒu
Yue: Cantonese
- Yale Romanization: chàjáu
- IPA: [tsʰȁː tsɐ̌u]

Hong Kong–style milk tea is made from a mix of several types of black tea. The exact blend varies between cha chaan teng, which treat the recipe as a commercial secret. In its standard form, the tea blend consists of:

- 30% broken orange pekoe (BOP, medium-grade tea leaves) that give the aroma
- 30% broken orange fannings (BOF, leftover smaller pieces of tea leaves) that give the deep reddish brown colour
- 30% dust (very fine particles of tea leaves) that gives the taste
- 10% Lipton (BOP and Ceylon tea) that enhances the aroma and texture

=== Process ===
Traditionally, the tea blend is put into a thin cotton bag, a signature of Hong Kong–style milk tea. The bag helps filter out the tea leaves and any astringency (bitterness), and makes the tea smoother. The tea-stained colour of the bags resemble the silk stockings that women wore, giving Hong Kong–style milk tea the nickname of "silk stocking" milk tea (Chinese: 絲襪奶茶; Cantonese Yale: sī maht náaihchà).

First, hot water at 96–98 °C (205–208 °F) is poured over the tea blend, which is allowed to steep for 12 minutes. The water is poured at a height of 60 cm (24 in) to apply sufficient pressure to the leaves, which results in an "even taste" and "fragrant aroma". Eventually, the tea leaves become half afloat, which cues the tea master to pour the tea back and forth from the sackcloth bag four times, in a process called "pulling". Pulling too many times overextracts the tea leaves, while pulling too few times causes the tea to lose its punchiness. After brewing, the tea is kept at 94 °C (201 °F) for up to an hour.

Before serving, a milk variant is added to the tea; an original-style milk tea would be 30% evaporated milk and require the customer to add their own sugar. Using evaporated milk, which is more concentrated than fresh milk, reduces the amount of liquid needed to achieve a smooth milkiness, therefore preventing overdilution of the tea's intensity. The most commonly used and best-known evaporated milk is produced by Dutch brand "Black&White", which tea makers say produces the smoothest brew.

=== Iced milk tea ===
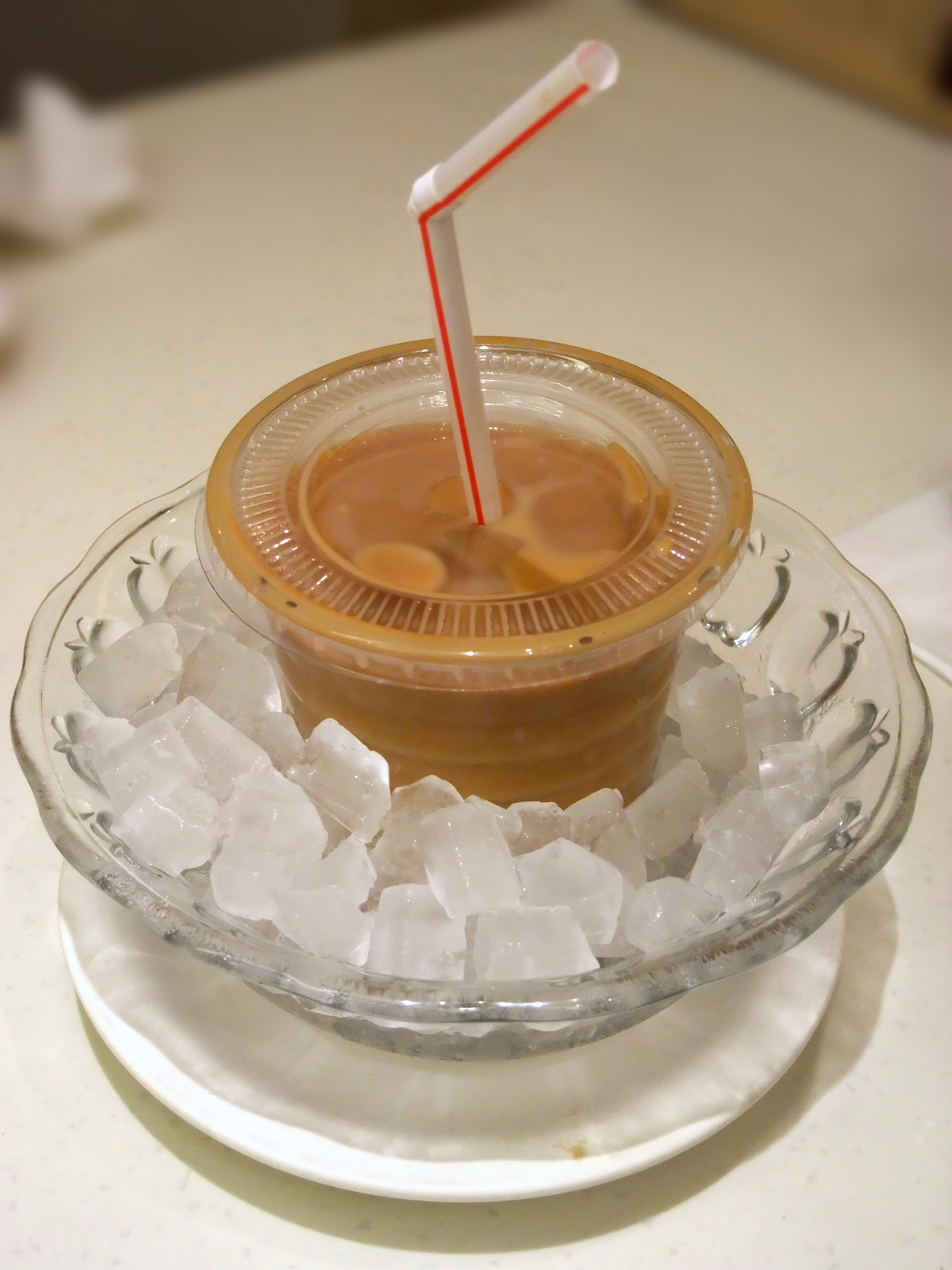
A cup of milk tea served in an ice bath, which prevents the drink from being diluted by melting ice while keeping the drink cold

In most restaurants, cold milk tea is prepared simply with ice cubes. However, this results in the drink getting gradually diluted as the ice melts, leading to some restaurants preparing their cold milk tea via ice-less methods as a selling point. For instance, the restaurant chain Tai Hing puts their cup of milk tea in a bowl of ice, known as "ice bath milk tea" (Chinese: 冰鎮奶茶; Cantonese Yale: Bīngjan náaihchà), an idea it says was inspired by the ice buckets used for beers. Others may simply use refrigerators or ice cubes made of frozen milk tea.

Before the prevalence of ice-making machines, cold milk tea was commonly prepared with the refrigerator. Hot milk tea would be poured into a Vitasoy or Coca-Cola glass bottle for cooling, and then sold directly to customers. Today, this type of glass-bottled milk tea is rare in Hong Kong, though cold milk tea served in metal cans or plastic bottles can be found in many local convenience stores, such as 7-Eleven and Circle K.

== Varieties ==
Apart from the classic evaporated milk, Hong Kong–style milk tea can also be made with naturally sweet condensed milk, which results in a variant named cha jau (茶走). Some cafes may also use filled milk, which is a combination of skimmed milk and soybean oil.

Hong Kong–style milk tea may be combined with coffee to make yuenyeung (Chinese: 鴛鴦; Cantonese Yale: Yūnyēung). The "silk-stocking" technique of making the milk tea can also be applied to coffee to give silk-stocking coffee.

== Popularity and culture ==
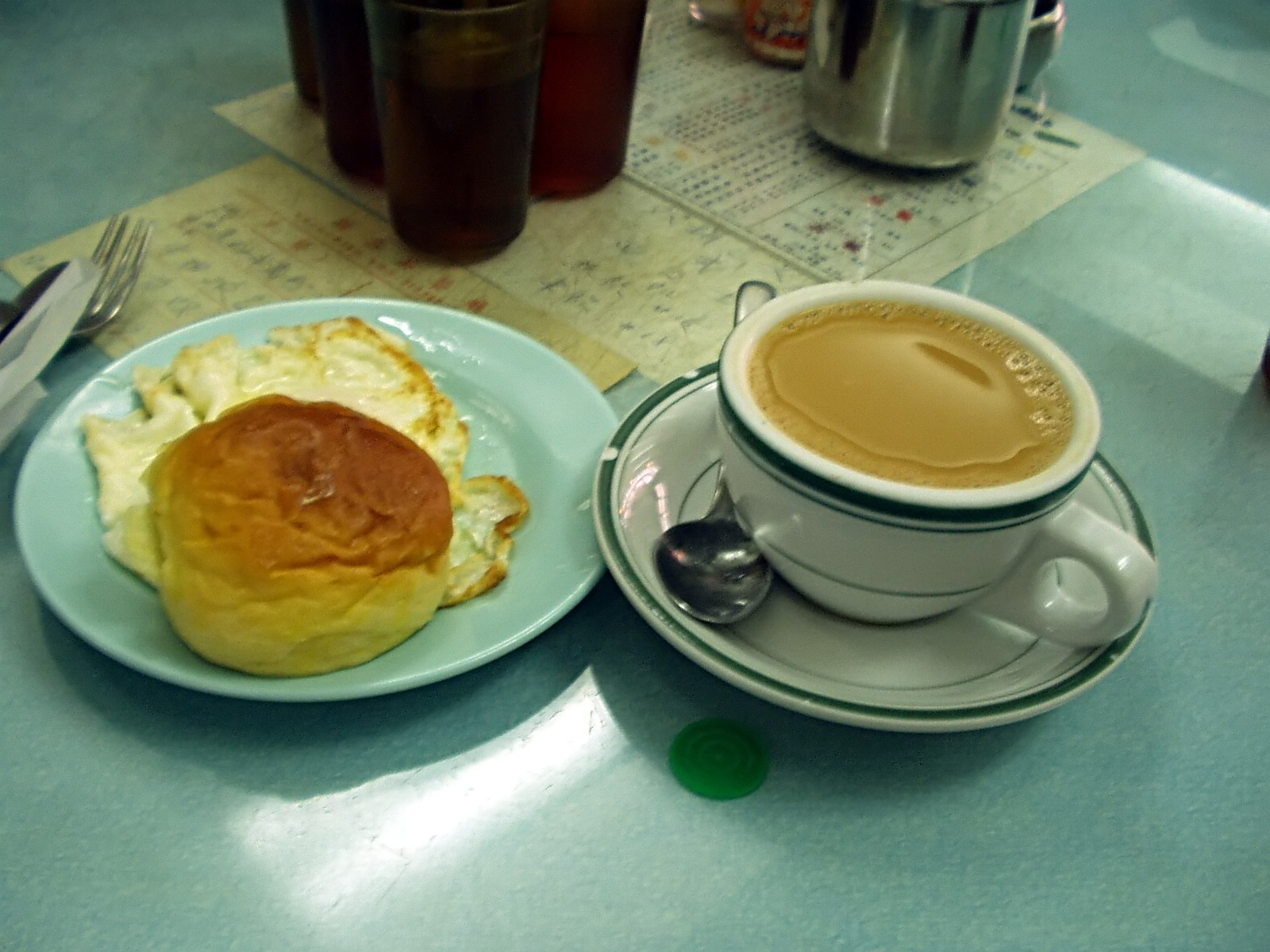
Hot milk tea in a coffee cup served alongside breakfast

Hong Kong–style milk tea is a popular part of many Hongkongers' daily lives, typically served as part of afternoon tea but also at breakfast or dinner. It enjoys nearly the same ubiquitous status that coffee holds in the West. A cup of milk tea costs roughly 20 Hong Kong dollars (US$2.66) as of August 2024, with industry estimates suggesting that Hongkongers consume an average of 2.5 million cups a day.

Hong Kong–style milk tea is also considered culturally significant in the city and is seen as a symbol of pride among locals. This first emerged in the 1990s, as Hong Kong was to be handed over from the UK to China in 1997. During this period, Hongkongers sought to identify local heritage and to construct their own identity, aiming to differentiate themselves from both the British and the mainland Chinese. This resulted in Hong Kong–style milk tea (among other cultural items, like cha chaan teng) becoming part of the Hong Kong identity. These sentiments were boosted in 2007 when the Hong Kong government removed Queen's Pier – a local landmark reminiscent of the city's colonial era – prompting many young Hongkongers to contemplate the local identity, which coupled with rising localist sentiments to further the drink's cultural significance.

With this symbolic status, Hong Kong–style milk tea may be considered by some overseas Hongkongers as comfort amid homesickness, providing a reminder of their childhood and identity. For those who have emigrated for political reasons, such as in the exodus that began in 2020, the drink may also be seen as a political statement. To them, drinking Hong Kong–style milk tea is an effort to preserve Hong Kong culture and "a form of silent resistance" amid perceived cultural erasure. In the UK, where many of these emigrants reside, this has led to an increase of Hong Kong–style milk tea brands and cafes.

In 2017, the Hong Kong government's Leisure and Cultural Services Department declared "Hong Kong–style milk tea making technique" as one of the intangible cultural heritages (ICH) of Hong Kong, under the domain "traditional craftsmanship" as specified by UNESCO Convention for the Safeguarding of the ICH.

== See also ==
- Hong Kong cuisine
- Milk tea
- Thai tea
- Teh tarik
- Milk Tea Alliance
