= Milk Tea Alliance =

Asian democracy and human rights movement

- The "Milk Tea Alliance" flag created by netizens. The colours represent (from left) Thai milk tea, Hong Kong milk tea and Taiwanese milk tea.

Chinese name
- Traditional Chinese: 奶茶聯盟
- Simplified Chinese: 奶茶联盟
Transcriptions
Standard Mandarin
- Hanyu Pinyin: Nǎichá Liánméng
- Bopomofo: ㄋㄞˇ ㄔㄚˊ ㄌㄧㄢˊ ㄇㄥˊ
- Wade–Giles: Nai-chʻa Lien-meng
Yue: Cantonese
- Yale Romanization: Náaihchàh Lyùhnmàhng
- Jyutping: Naai^{5}caa^{4} Lyun^{4}mang^{4}
Southern Min
- Hokkien POJ: Ni-tê Liân-bêng

Burmese name
- Burmese: နို့လက်ဖက်ရည်မဟာမိတ်

Thai name
- Thai: พันธมิตรชานม
- RTGS: Phanthamit Cha Nom

The Milk Tea Alliance is a democracy and human rights movement consisting of netizens from Hong Kong, Taiwan, Thailand, and Myanmar (Burma). It originally started as an internet meme, created in response to the increased presence of Chinese nationalist commentators on social media and has evolved into a dynamic multinational protest movement against authoritarianism and advocating democracy in different parts of Asia.

== Name ==
Milk tea is a popular drink in Hong Kong, Taiwan, and Thailand, the original three countries and territories included in the movement. Netizens from Myanmar and India who later joined also share their own variations of tea with milk. Taiwanese bubble tea, Hong Kong-style milk tea, Thai tea and Burmese milk tea are all local variations of milk tea with strong similarities.

== History ==
External image
- Milk Tea Alliance memes published by "奶茶通俗學 Milktealogy" Facebook

=== Origin ===
In 2020, a Thai actor Vachirawit Chivaaree, also known as Bright, inadvertently reposted an image on Twitter which listed Hong Kong as a "country" (Hong Kong is a special administrative region of China). His post led to negative reactions from Chinese netizens, who attacked him. Vachirawit later apologised for his oversight and removed the image. Thai netizens took to social media and defended Vachirawit with their criticism turning into more generalised criticism of China, launching a Twitter war. Vachirawit's girlfriend also came under spotlight for perceived support of Taiwanese independence. On June 25, 2020, GMM Grammy, the parent company of GMMTV, where he is a talent, sent lawyers to the Technology Crime Unit to file lawsuits against social media users accused of spreading malicious messages about him.

Chinese netizens launched attacks targeting various aspects of Thailand, including Thai King Vajiralongkorn and Prime Minister Prayut Chan-o-cha, though much of this failed to have the intended effect as the Thai netizens were generally already critical of their own country and government, with some even encouraging the insults. The Chinese embassy in Bangkok posted a long statement on Facebook condemning the online criticism and a fierce digital battle ensued between Thai netizens and the Chinese embassy.

Within Thailand, support for Hong Kong and Taiwan's struggle against Chinese encroachment has unified the disparate groups of pro-democracy protesters with anti-Beijing sentiment becoming a part of their anti-authoritarian platform. Twitter users in Taiwan and Hong Kong soon joined Thai users in what The Telegraph called "a rare moment of regional solidarity". Pallabi Munsi, writing in OZY, in July 2020, described the Milk Tea Alliance as "Asia's volunteer army rising against China's internet trolls."

=== Further developments ===
Map of the "Milk Tea Alliance". India is included in some appraisals.

In the following months, the Milk Tea Alliance evolved from an anti-Beijing meme into a "leaderless protest movement pushing for change across Southeast Asia."

Following the 2020 China–India skirmishes, India has also been included in some formulations of the Alliance with masala chai being their representative variety of milk tea. Politicians in both Taiwan and India have highlighted the existence of the Milk Tea Alliance including Taiwanese representative to the US Hsiao Bi-khim who used the hashtag in a tweet thanking Indians for their support. After Australia called for an investigation into the World Health Organization's handling of the COVID-19 pandemic, China threatened a consumer boycott if Australia did not back down from its demands for an inquest. Netizens then included Australia as a member of the Milk Tea Alliance, however, the relation to milk tea is tenuous with the milk product Aptamil standing in for an actual variety of milk tea in imagery.

In August 2020 renewed pro-democracy protests in Thailand, the largest since the 2014 military coup, drew support and solidarity from Taiwanese and Hong Kongers including activist Joshua Wong. The hashtag #MilkTeaAlliance was heavily used by protesters. The 2020 Belarusian protests broke out in August following opposition rejection to the results of the presidential election. Activists from the country, inspired by the Milk Tea Alliance, began to use Ryazhenka, a traditional fermented milk product drink of Belarus, Russia, and Ukraine as a symbol of resistance to the government of Alexander Lukashenko.

In February 2021, in the wake of the 2021 Myanmar coup d'état, activists in Myanmar and neighbouring Thailand began adopting the Milk Tea Alliance in show of solidarity, with pictures of Royal Myanmar Tea bags shared thousands of times. An illustration by Thai artist Sina Wittayawiroj that depicts Thai, Taiwanese, Hong Kong, Indian and Burmese milk tea under the "Milk Tea Alliance" headline went viral. The anti-coup protesters have been solidly integrated into the online protest movement. The Diplomat describes the Milk Tea Allianceas a non-institutionalised, pro-democracy alternative to ASEAN and "a central force in shaping the way Myanmar's youth understand the current battle between pro-democracy protesters and their vastly better armed opponents, a predicament faced by other youth in neighboring countries."

In April 2021, Twitter created an emoji in support of the Milk Tea Alliance following anti-Beijing protests across Hong Kong and the 2021 Myanmar coup. It marked the one year anniversary of the Milk Tea Alliance.

Aside from the countries already mentioned, the movement has also recruited members from Malaysia, Indonesia, Belarus and Iran.

== Organization ==
The movement does not have a formal leadership or hierarchy.

== See also ==
- 2013–2014 Cambodian protests
- 2020–2021 Thai protests
- 2025 Indonesian protests
- Freedom pineapples
- Straw Hat Pirates' Jolly Roger
