= ChaTraMue =

Thai tea brand

- Type: Thai tea
- Manufacturer: Cha Thai International Co.
- Distributor: Various, including Cha Thai International Co. and Tiptari Co Ltd
- Origin: Thailand
- Introduced: 1945

ChaTraMue (Thai: ชาตรามือ, lit. 'Hand Brand Tea' or 'Number One Brand Tea') is a Thailand-based tea brand. Founded in 1945, the brand's main manufacturer and distributor is the Cha Thai International Co, which holds a 70% market share of the Thai tea industry. Tiptari Co. Ltd operates a chain of tea shops across Thailand, with various franchise chains internationally. The company has helped popularize Thai tea, a form of sweetened milk tea.

== Brand history ==
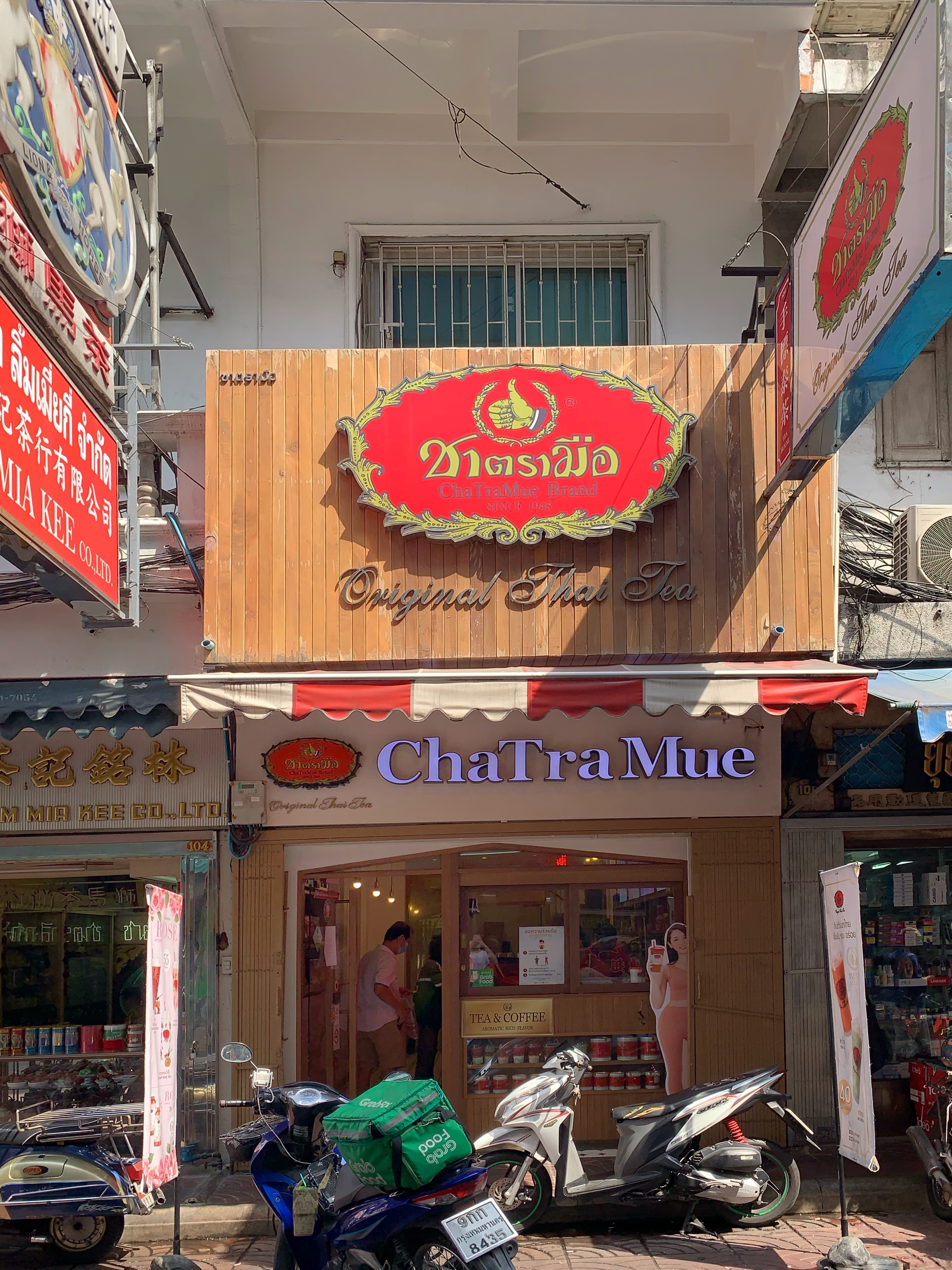
ChanTraMue outlet at Yaowarat Road

In 1920, a group of eight Teochew siblings immigrated from Chaozhou, China, to Thailand. Sa Pae, the third son of the group, founded a tea store at Chaloem Buri in the Bangkok Chinatown in 1925, which he named Lim Meng Kee. The company imported and sold tea from China, including oolong and green tea. The shop was destroyed in a bombing raid on Bangkok during World War II, and relocated to Yaowarat Road. Around this time, they began importing Chinese black tea (or 'red tea'). As hot tea was less popular in the tropical climate of Bangkok, the company moved away from traditional Chinese tea and selling iced black tea and iced milk tea.

In 1945, the company founded the ChaTraMue brand (ชาตรามือ, 'Hand Brand Tea' or 'Number One Brand Tea'). It began sourcing tea from Northern Thailand, establishing a processing facility named Cha Hom in Mae Suai district in western Chiang Rai province. During the 1960s, operations ceased at this factory due to logistical expenses. After a period of purchasing the tea independently from local planters, the company established the Siam Tea Factory at Wiang Pa Pao district. This facility was later incorporated as Cha Thai International Co. Ltd, which now serves as the manufacturer and distributor of ChaTraMue tea. The company's sweetened orange milk tea has popularized Thai tea internationally.

== Operations ==
In addition to Cha Thai International Co. Ltd, three other companies are associated with the ChaTraMue brand. Tiptari Co. Ltd. operates a chain of tea shops using the ChaTraMue branding. Siam F B Products Co. Ltd. sells the tea for foreign markets, while ChaTraMue 1945 Co. Ltd operates the online stores for the tea. As of 2025, Cha Thai International Co. holds a 70% market share of the Thai tea industry.

Tiptari Co.'s chain of ChaTraMue tea shops consist of 240 branches in 20 Thai provinces. A total of 136 franchise locations of the brand operate outside of Thailand, over fifty of which are in neighboring Malaysia. In addition to tea, these stores sell coffee, fruit tea, tea-flavored ice cream, and baked goods. In 2025, Tiptari introduced a new upscale chain of tea shops named CTM ("Captivating Tea Muse") using rare and specialty tea blends.
