= Seaside Donuts Bakery =

Newport Beach bakery

- Interactive map of Seaside Donuts Bakery

General information
- Location: 2108 W Oceanfront, Newport Beach, CA 92663
- Coordinates: 33.6088192453586°N 117.92894699712137°W

Seaside Donuts Bakery, also known as Seaside Bakery or just Seaside, is a Cambodian American-owned bakery in Newport Beach, California. It is open for 24 hours a day.

Established in 1985, the bakery garnered local popularity for its affordable selections and beachside atmosphere. Since the 2020s, it has gained explosive attention from Asian American content creators on TikTok.

== Eap family ==
The bakery was established in 1985 by Kong Eap, a Cambodian immigrant who had moved to the United States in the 1970s. It was one of the many Cambodian American-owned bakeries that were opened in the area following the success of "Donut King" Ted Ngoy's donut shops in Southern California.

A few decades later, Eap passed on ownership of the bakery to his son, Roger Eap, after which he began working in the hospitality industry. Eap also eventually acquired Simone's Donuts, a donut shop in Long Beach, California, which his daughter, Melissa Eap, now runs.

== Popularity ==
For many years of its establishment, the bakery has attracted local attention from college students, such as those at the University of California, Irvine, due to its affordable pastries and relaxing atmosphere.

=== Asian American community ===
Since the 2020s, the bakery has additionally gained newfound traction online due to its frequent attendance by younger people in the Asian American community in Southern California, sometimes known by the abbreviated term "SoCal Asians." As such, the bakery has sometimes been called "ABG heaven," referring to the term "Asian Baby Girl," and has come to be associated with 2020s stereotypes regarding the community.

Some have criticized the commotion around the bakery's popularity which has altered the bakery's calm, ambient nature. A few content creators have called out "the male college students purposefully creating obnoxious videos" on TikTok at the bakery: "These TikTok videos include yelling and interviewing customers in line. Its content discusses or satirizes stereotypical qualities or interests that many Asian Southern Californian students share." In particular, some have observed its "rambunctious nature" particularly after midnight.

== Accolades ==
The bakery has been featured in the Los Angeles Times' Daily Pilot, Female Foodie, Hoodline, and other publications. Its green Thai tea donut has drawn special attention by reviewers online.

Hoodline rated the bakery #14 in their list of America's favorite donut shops.
