= Doodh pati chai =

Tea beverage from the Indian subcontinent

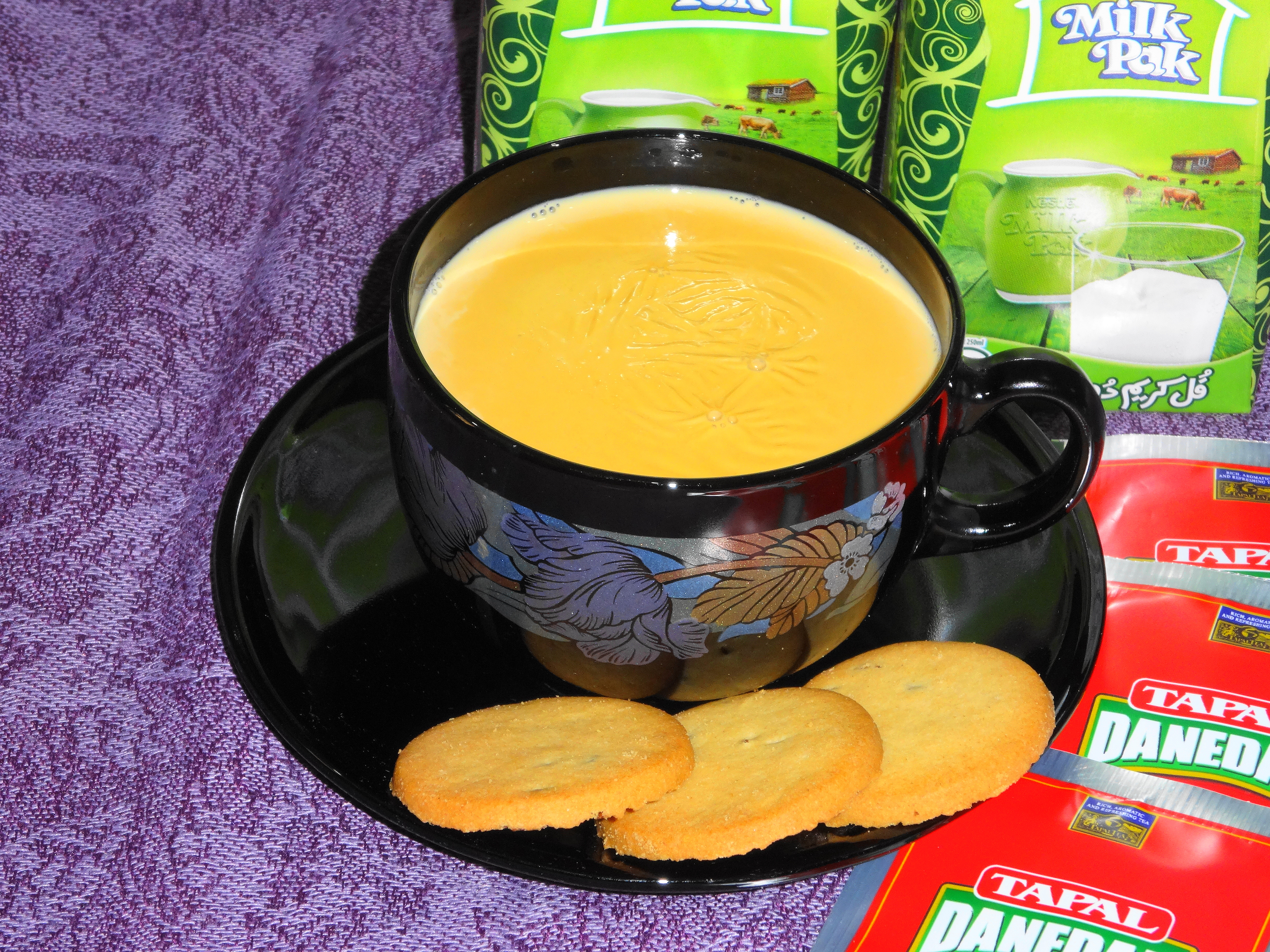
- A cup of doodh patti chai with biscuits
- Type: Flavoured tea
- Course: Drink
- Region or state: South Asia
- Main ingredients: Tea, milk, spices, sugar (optional)
- Similar dishes: Burmese milk tea; Hong Kong–style milk tea; Teh tarik

Doodh pati chai (from Hindi दूध पत्ति चाय' and Urdu دودھ پتی چائے' 'milk leaf tea') is a tea beverage, originating from the Indian subcontinent, consumed in India, Pakistan, Bangladesh, Afghanistan and Nepal in which milk, together with sugar, is boiled with tea. Doodh pati is different from saada chai, in that it only uses milk (as opposed to water) and tea. This tea is quite common in South Asia. It is marginally costlier than the regular, water-based saada chai.

== Etymology and terminology ==
In many Indo-Aryan languages, chai or cha is the word for tea. This comes from the Persian چای (chay), which originated from the Chinese word for tea (茶; chá). Doodh means milk and pati means leaf. Therefore, the term, Doodh pati chai literally means milk leaf tea.

== Preparation ==
One preparation method is to add full cream milk to a pot and leaving it to a boil along with various spices such as green cardamom, ginger, black cardamom, cinnamon, black peppercorns, black cloves, fennel seeds, nutmeg, dried ginger powder, as well as saffron in the upper to middle classes. Once the milk and spices come to a boil, tea is added to it. The mixture is then left to brew. Sugar is often added as per one's taste. After mixing thoroughly on low heat, a tea strainer is used before serving the chai. It is usually poured into cups but some prefer to drink it the old fashioned way, from the edge of a saucer.

== Consumption ==
Doodh pati is famously consumed in northern India and Pakistan, where it is boiled along with cardamom, ginger and many other whole spices listed above. Typically, it is available at roadside dhabas and chaiwalas at street corners, but is most commonly prepared at home, though less so than its water based alternative. It is mainly consumed in North India and Pakistan, though it is also consumed occasionally in Nepal and Bangladesh and has spread even to the Middle East due to its popularity.

Doodh pati is also often served at roadside Dhabas and Chaiwalas all over South Asia. It is also consumed during leisure time after a hectic day.

== See also ==
- Indian tea culture
- Pakistani tea culture
- Bangladeshi cuisine
