= Milk tea =

Beverage mainly composed of tea and milk

An Indian milk tea

Milk tea refers to several forms of beverage found in many cultures, consisting of some combination of tea and milk. The term milk tea is used for both hot and cold drinks that can be combined with various kinds of milks and a variety of spices. This is a popular way to serve tea in many countries, and is the default type of tea in many South Asian countries. Beverages vary based on the amount of each of these key ingredients, the method of preparation, and the inclusion of other ingredients (varying from sugar or honey to salt or cardamom) Milk tea is the default type of tea in India and Pakistan and referred to as chai.

Milk tea is commonly found in countries such as the United States, United Kingdom, Malaysia, India, Pakistan, China, and other Asian countries. The recipes for milk tea mainly consist of a tea base, milk, added sugar, and other added ingredients such as fruits, and creamer. The drink is popular for its flavor, affordability, aesthetics, sweetness, and diversity that appeals to many people, which is similar to coffee in the drink market.

The drink is especially popular among teenagers and young adults for its visuals and large variety. The milk tea industry is likely to continue to grow due to its rising popularity in the global market. The sugar that balances the milk and tea from the cultural beverage is leading to a larger consumption among people daily. This has caused an increase in milk tea shops all around the world in recent years. The popularity of milk tea pushes the industry to pursue more supply chains and new products.

== Variations ==
=== Chinese milk tea ===
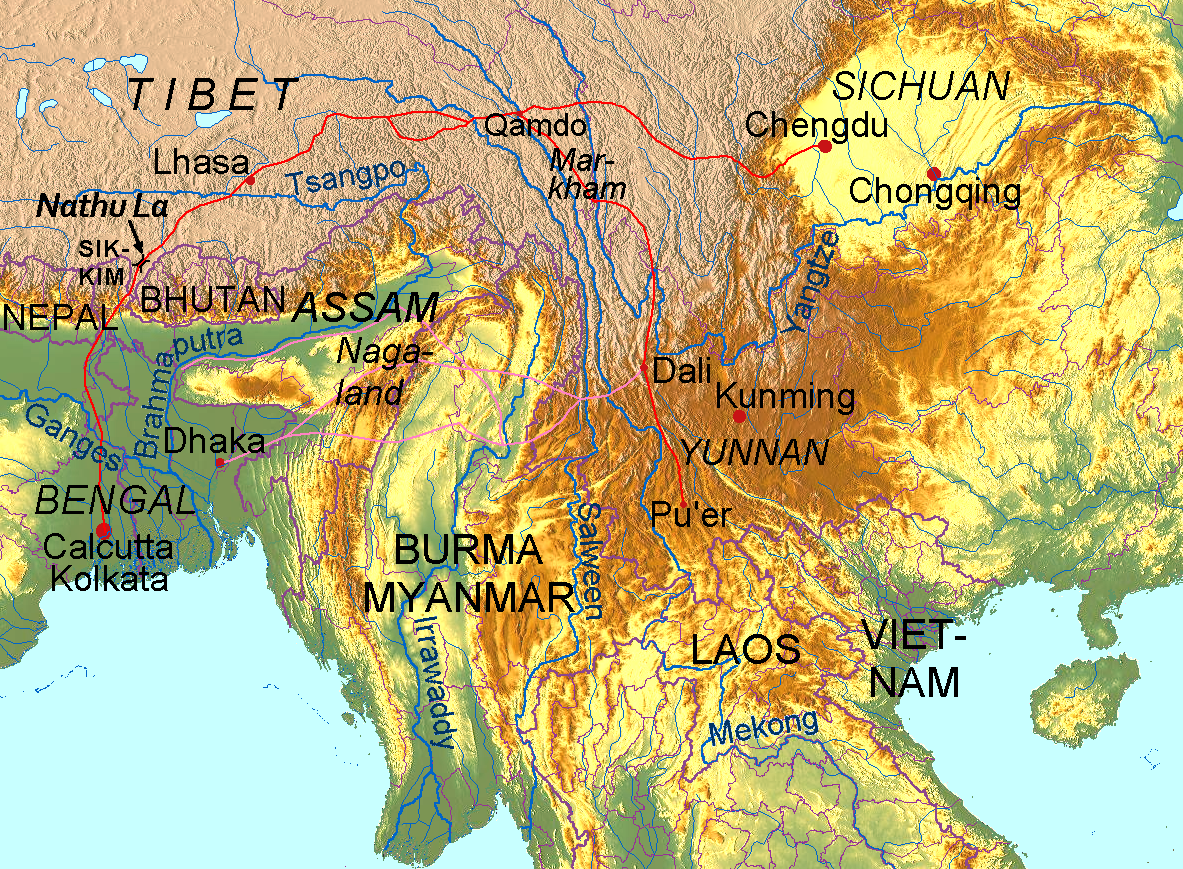
The ancient Chinese Trades of tea in exchange for horses

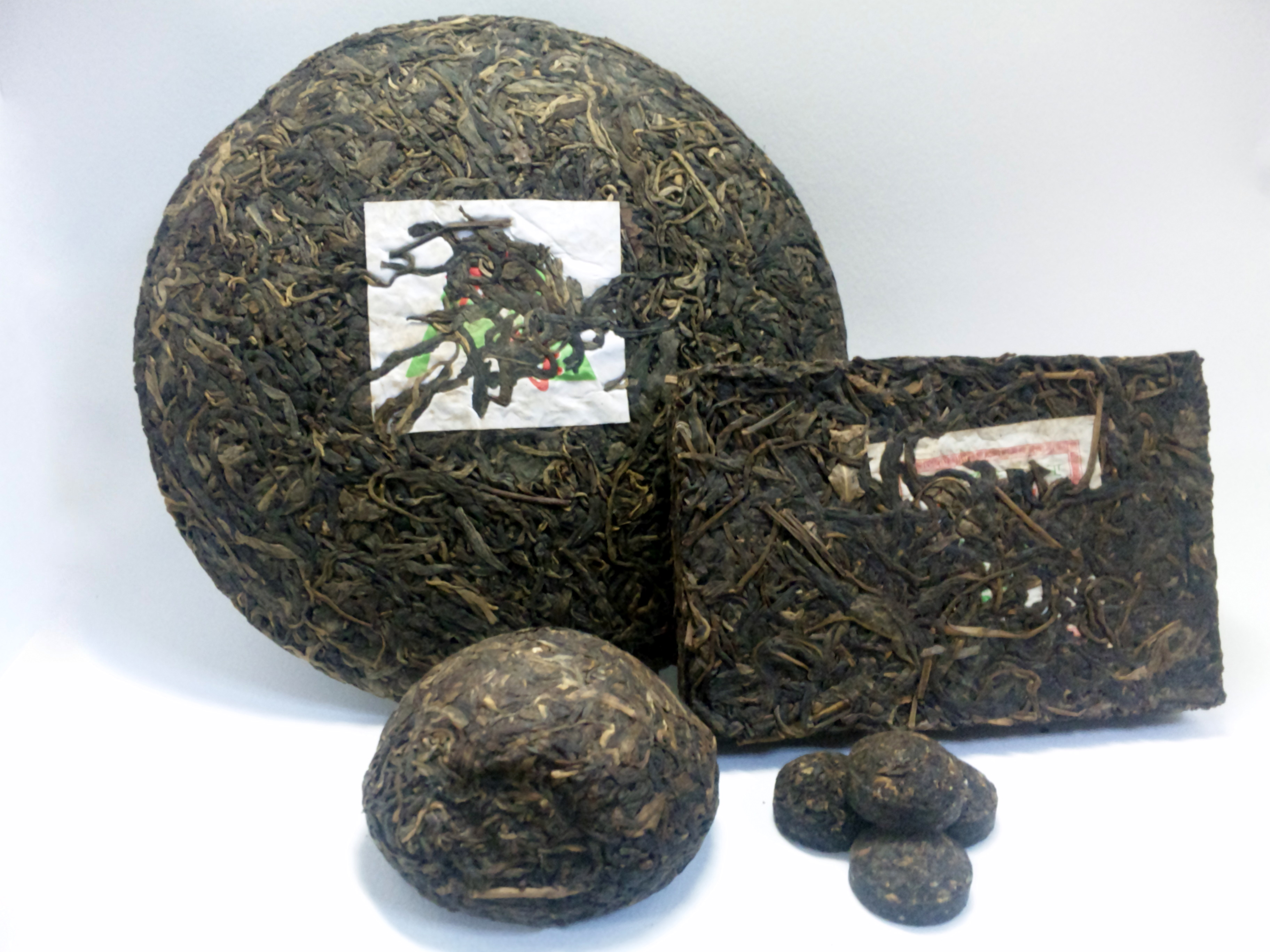
Chinese tea bricks for trading

In ancient China, tea was primarily consumed for its caffeine content. Milk has been historically regarded as a prominent beverage among nomadic communities, symbolizing their cultural identity. As nomadic populations migrated southward, the consumption of milk gradually permeated the Central Plains region, and history records that when Emperor Dezong of Tang made tea, he added "crispy", which is processed and fermented milk, and found it to be delicious. Since then, milk tea became more and more popular in the mainland market because of the opening of tea-horse trading: the emperor moves tea from farms to pastures or good horses and cows that he needs for war and production. In this case, milk tea has started to spread in different places other than mainland China. In 2019, the milk tea market sold over approximately 140.5 billion renminbi. Some of the most popular milk tea brands include Coco, Alittle, and Heytea. There is also a legend of an ancient monk named Bodhidharma whose eyelids fell into water that was then boiled, leading to the discovery of tea in China.

=== Grassland milk tea ===
Grassland milk tea is often referred to as salty milk tea because of its preparation. In the pastoral regions of China, such as the Inner Mongolia, Xinjiang, and Tibet, nomadic communities follow the process of initially crushing the tea leaves and subsequently infusing them in boiling water. The tea is then boiled, followed by the addition of milk, which is stirred into the mixture. Finally, an appropriate quantity of salt is incorporated, resulting in the completion of the milk tea preparation. Salt is also used for long term storage as the horde face long-distance travel and extreme weather conditions.

=== Hong Kong–style milk tea ===
Hong Kong milk tea comes from its ties to British milk tea during the colonial era. Since the taste of British milk tea was not very strong, people in Hong Kong changed this drink by adding crushed Ceylon black tea, which is usually called Sri Lanka black tea. Because of its similar pronunciation, Sri Lanka milk tea is then translated to Silang milk tea in Hong Kong. The process of making Silang milk tea has six steps: scraping the tea, boiling the tea, baking the tea, infusing the tea, and adding milk. The tea was put through a sieve as part of the way it was made, which also led to the name "silk hose milk tea". On top of that, evaporated milk was added to the tea to finish the drink.

=== Taiwan milk tea ===
Taiwan milk tea is well-known in the form of bubble milk tea. Milk tea originated in the 17th century, when the Dutch brought it there. Boba is a round tapioca ball that looks like a pearl. Before being added to the milk tea, this tapioca pearl is usually dipped in syrup. This is done to make sure that when the tapioca pearl is mixed with the sugary milk tea, it keeps its natural sweetness. Bubble tea has acquired such a significant role in representing Taiwanese culture that the people of Taiwan commemorate April 30 annually as the National Day of Bubble Tea.

=== Other variations ===
- British tea, served with milk
- Bubble tea, also known as pearl milk tea or boba milk tea, is a Taiwanese tea-based drink invented in Taichung in the 1980s. While the terms "bubble tea" and "boba" are often used interchangeably, bubble tea refers to the drink made by combining tea, milk, and sugar, and then adding toppings like boba, fruit jelly, or other toppings. Boba, on the other hand, is a type of topping that is commonly added to bubble tea. It is made from tapioca pearls and adds a unique flavor and texture to the drink.
- Burmese milk tea, called laphet yay (လက်ဖက်ရည်), made with strongly brewed black tea leaves, and sweetened with a customized ratio of condensed milk and evaporated milk, is popular in Myanmar. It is commonly served in tea shops, which first emerged during British rule in Burma.
- Cambric tea, a sweetened hot-milk beverage, often made with a small amount of tea
- Doodh pati chai, literally 'milk and tea leaves', a tea beverage drunk in India, Pakistan, Nepal, and Bangladesh
- Teh tarik, a kind of milk tea popular in Malaysia, Indonesia, and Singapore
- Suutei tsai, a salty Mongolian milk tea
- Shahi Adani, a Yemeni milk tea
- Masala chai, also known as masala tea, is a spiced milk tea drunk in the Indian subcontinent
- Irani chai, a type of milk tea made with pure milk mixed with mawa, prepared in Iranian-style cafes in Hyderabad, India
- Thai tea, a sweet tea-based drink popular in Southeast Asia
- Dalgona milk tea, milk tea sweetened with traditional Korean dalgona, a honeycomb-like toffee

In Britain, when hot tea and cold milk are drunk together, the drink is simply known as tea due to the vast majority of tea being consumed in such a way; the term milk tea, if used at all, would more likely refer to one of the East or Southeast Asian drinks. One may specify tea with milk or milky tea if context requires it, which may cause confusion for people from cultures that traditionally drink tea without milk.

Milk tea variations
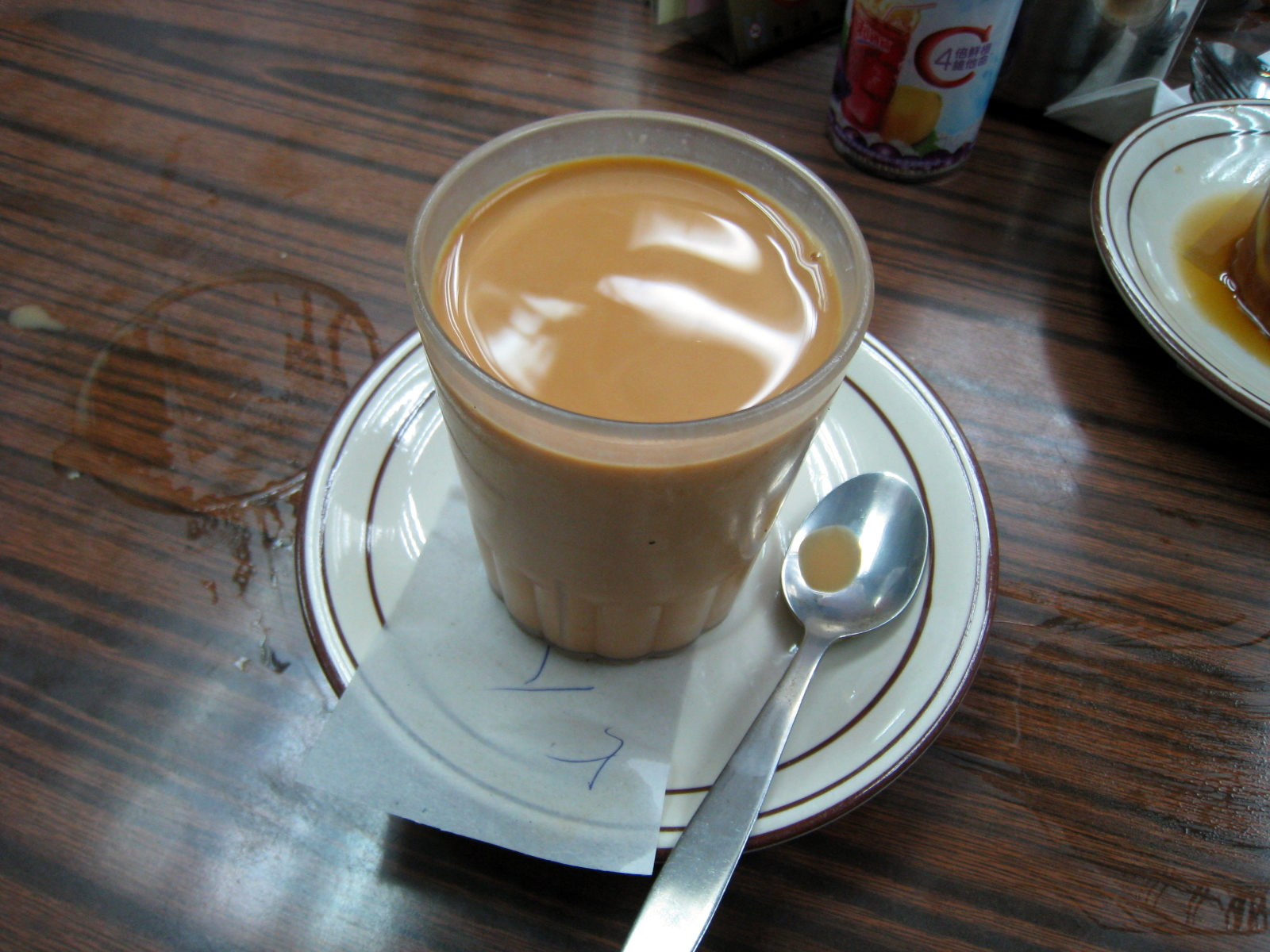
Hong Kong-style milk tea

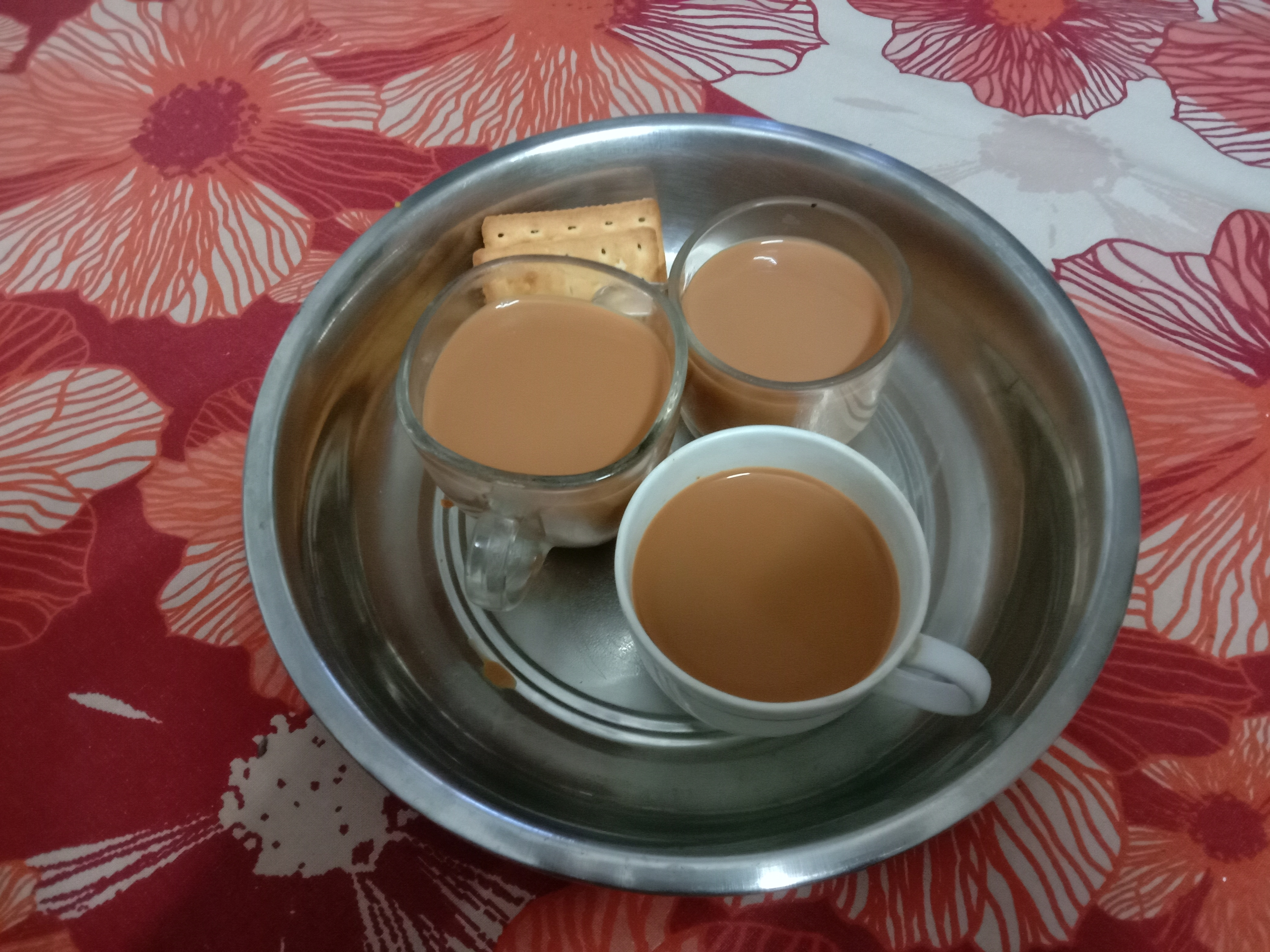
Milk tea served in India

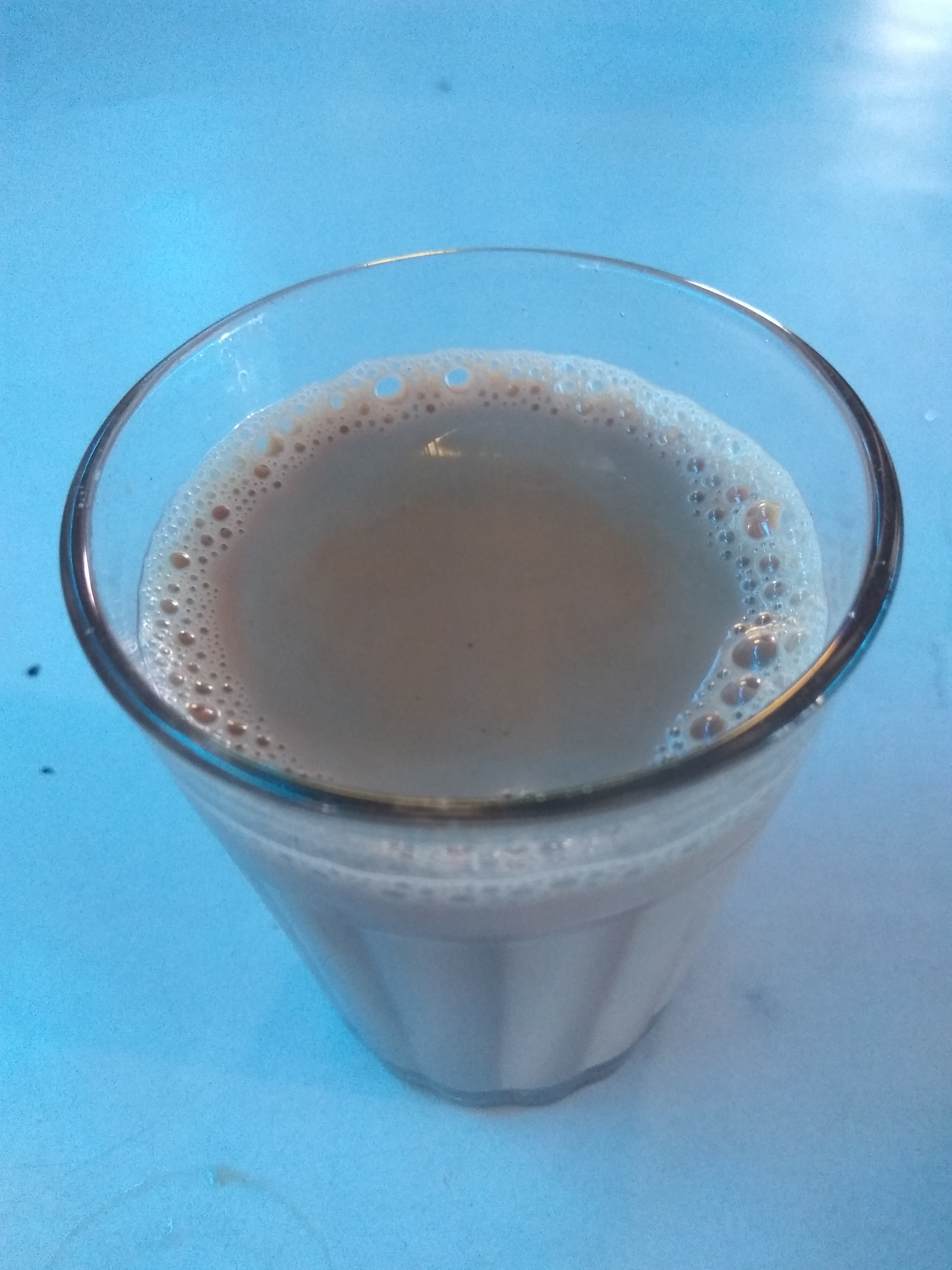
A glass of milk tea in Nepal

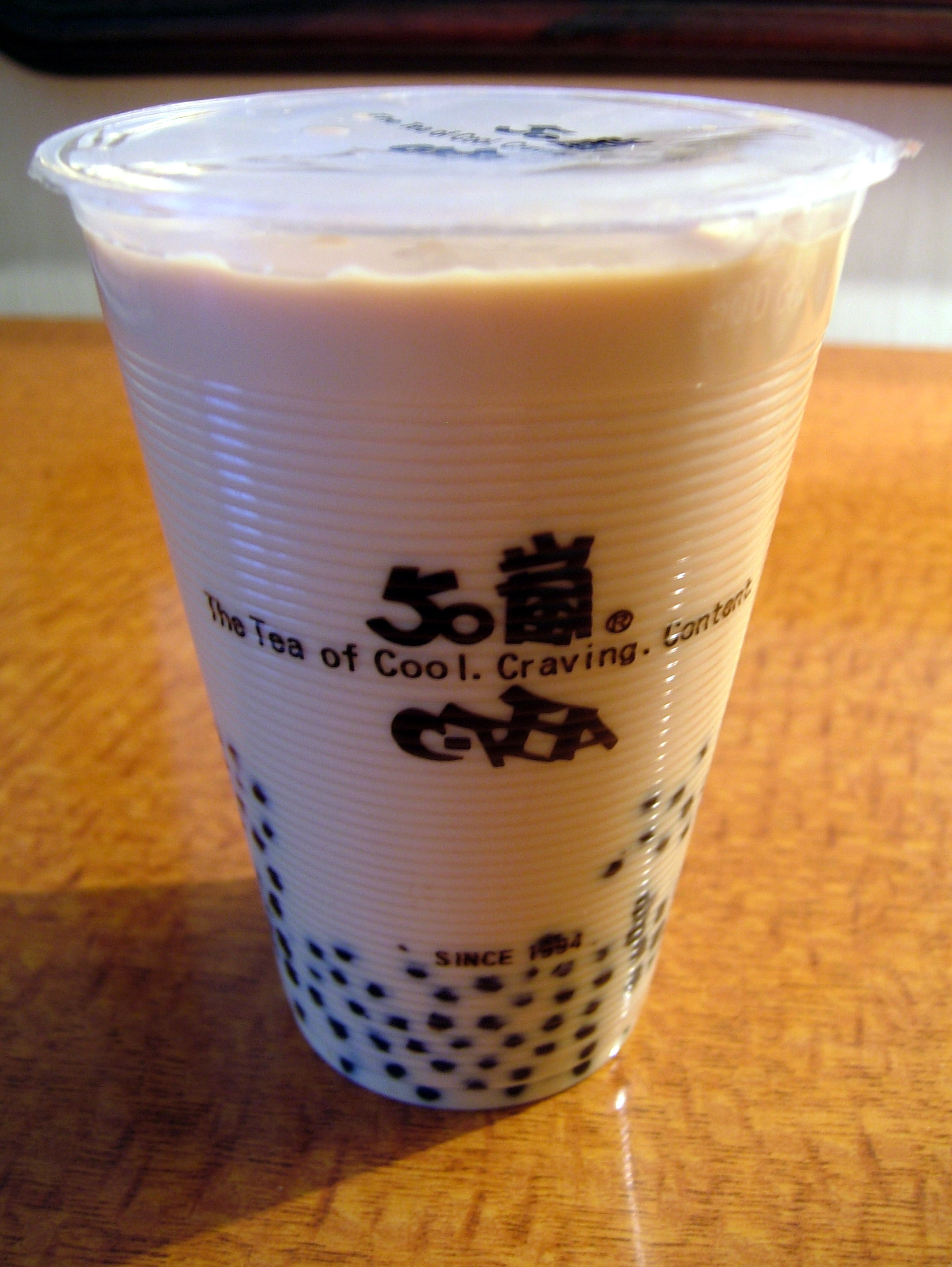
Taiwan bubble milk tea

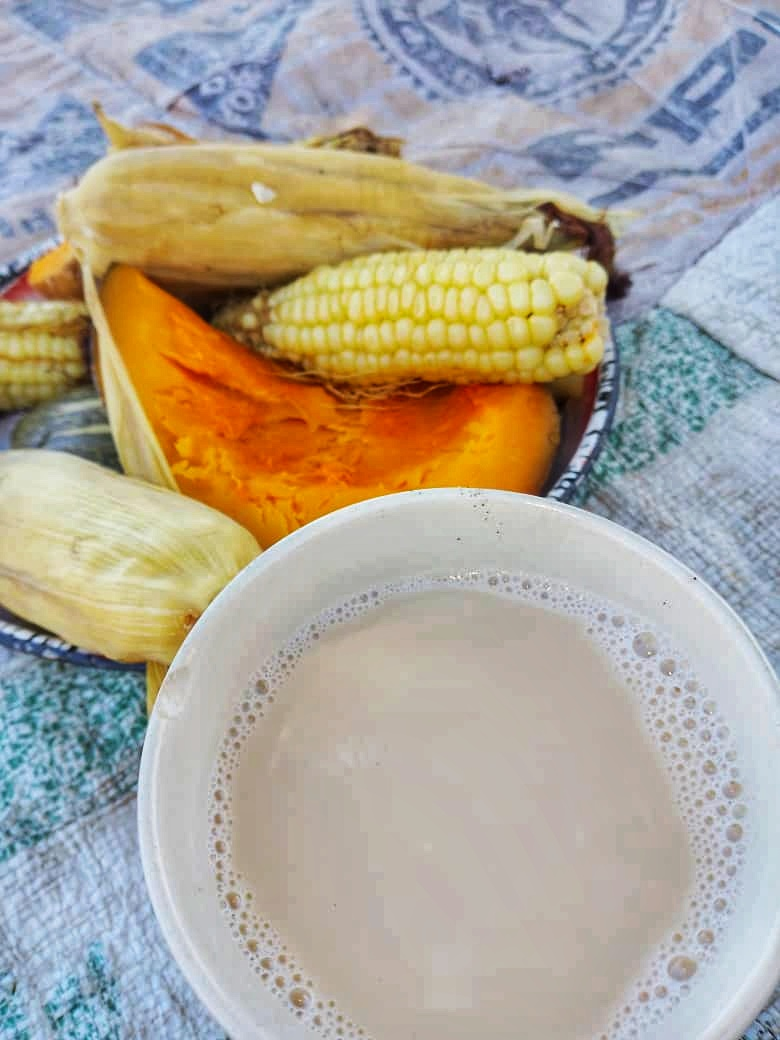
Zimbabwean milk tea

== Pharmacology ==
Milk teas are generally high in sugar, fats and carbohydrates, increasing the risk of obesity when consumed regularly. Some milk teas also contain high concentrations of caffeine. Tests have found milk teas containing generally around 150 mg of caffeine per 470 mL serving. In the EU, beverages containing more than 150 mg/L of caffeine are to be labeled 'high caffeine content' as a warning. A study has found that regular milk tea consumption may cause symptoms of addiction in adolescents.

== See also ==
- Milk Tea Alliance
