= Burmese milk tea =

Tea beverage from Myanmar (Burma)

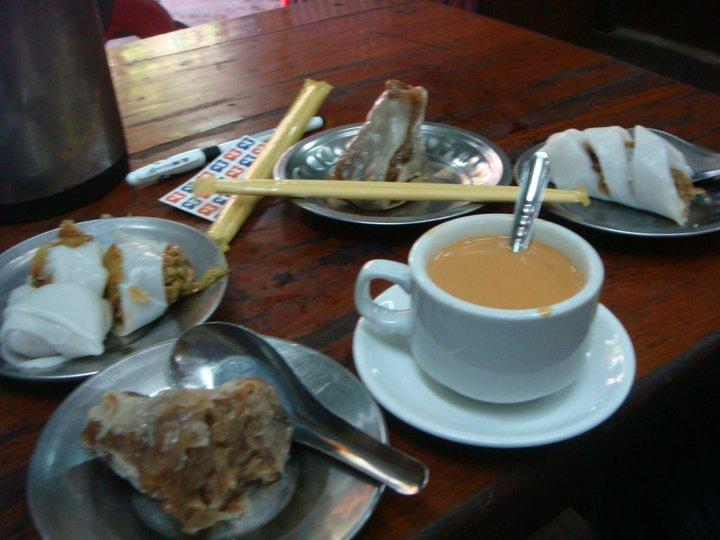
- Burmese milk tea served with Burmese fritters and sweets called mont at a teahouse
- Alternative names: Myanmar milk tea
- Course: Drink
- Place of origin: Myanmar (Burma)
- Region or state: Southeast Asia
- Associated cuisine: Burmese
- Main ingredients: black tea leaves, evaporated milk, and condensed milk
- Similar dishes: Doodh pati chai; Hong Kong-style milk tea; Teh tarik

Burmese milk tea (Burmese: လက်ဖက်ရည်, lit. 'tea liquid') is a tea beverage from Myanmar (Burma), traditionally made with strongly brewed black tea and milk (typically evaporated milk and condensed milk). Burmese milk tea is commonly consumed at tea shops, as an accompaniment to bite-sized snacks like Burmese fritters and sweets called mont.

== History ==
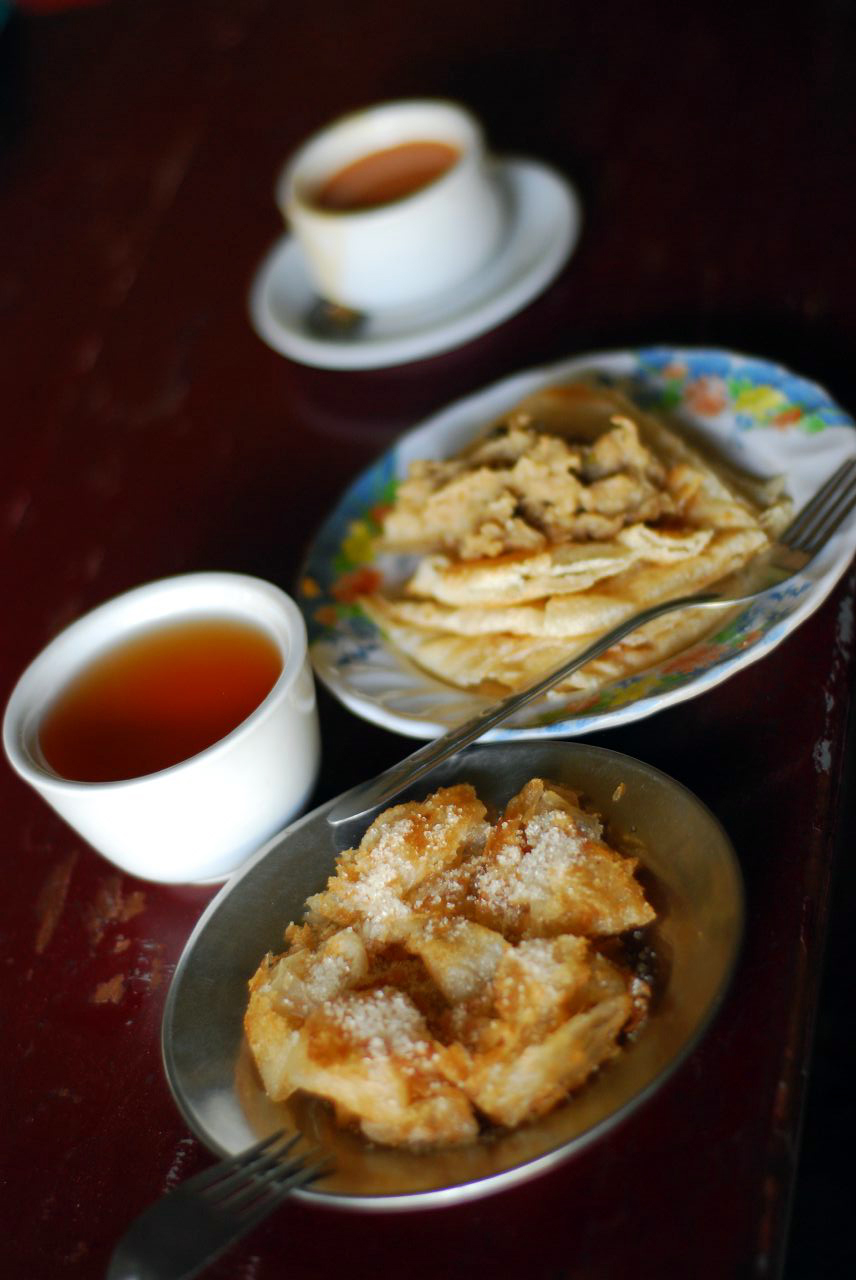
Palata served with green tea and milk tea at a Burmese teahouse

Myanmar has a longstanding tea culture, stemming from a long history of tea cultivation in what is now Upper Myanmar. In pre-colonial times, people primarily drank green tea, which continues to be a mainstay at tea shops and traditional Burmese restaurants alike.

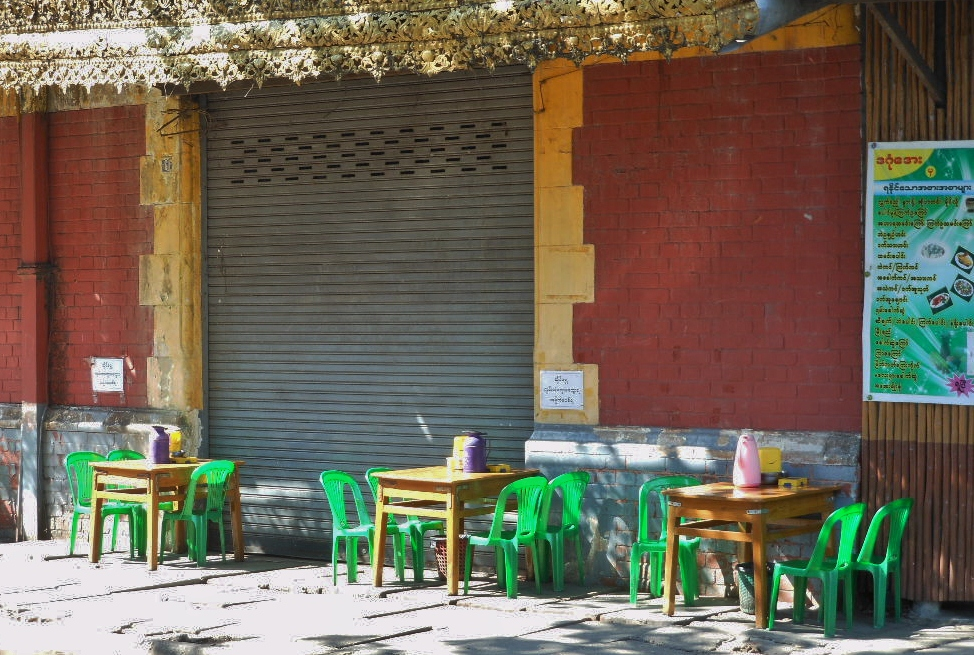
A tea shop in Downtown Yangon with low-lying tables and chairs on the sidewalk

During British rule in Burma, Burma became a part of British India. From the late 1800s onward, Indian migrants flocked to major cities where they established general stores called kaka hsaing, which also offered milk tea and eventually evolved into tea shops. Milk tea was prepared using strongly brewed tea, steamed fresh milk, and sugar, similar to Indian milk tea.

== Ingredients ==
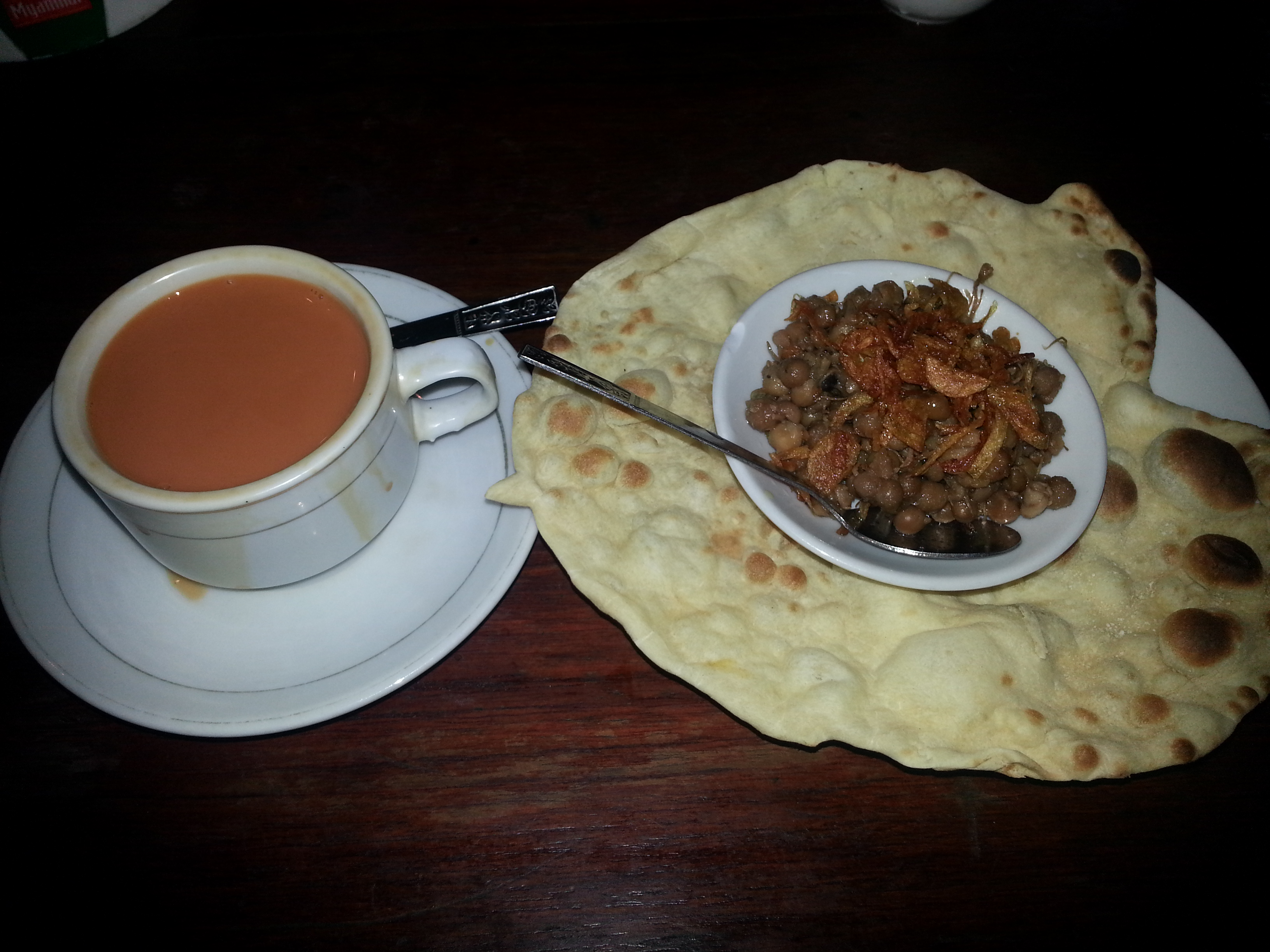
Burmese milk tea served with naan and steamed peas, a common teatime snack

Burmese milk tea is made using strongly brewed black tea, which is called akya yay (အကျရည်) or aphan yay (အဖန်ရည်), evaporated milk, and condensed milk, similar to Hong Kong–style milk tea. Fresh milk, cream (called malai in Burmese), and cane sugar are also optionally added or substituted as ingredients.

== Preparation ==
The base of Burmese milk tea is strongly brewed using black tea leaves, which are simmered in water and a bit of salt, typically between 15 and 30 minutes. The tea base is then combined with evaporated and condensed milk, and 'pulled' in a manner similar to teh tarik, in order to create a frothy layer and to cool the beverage.

== Varieties ==
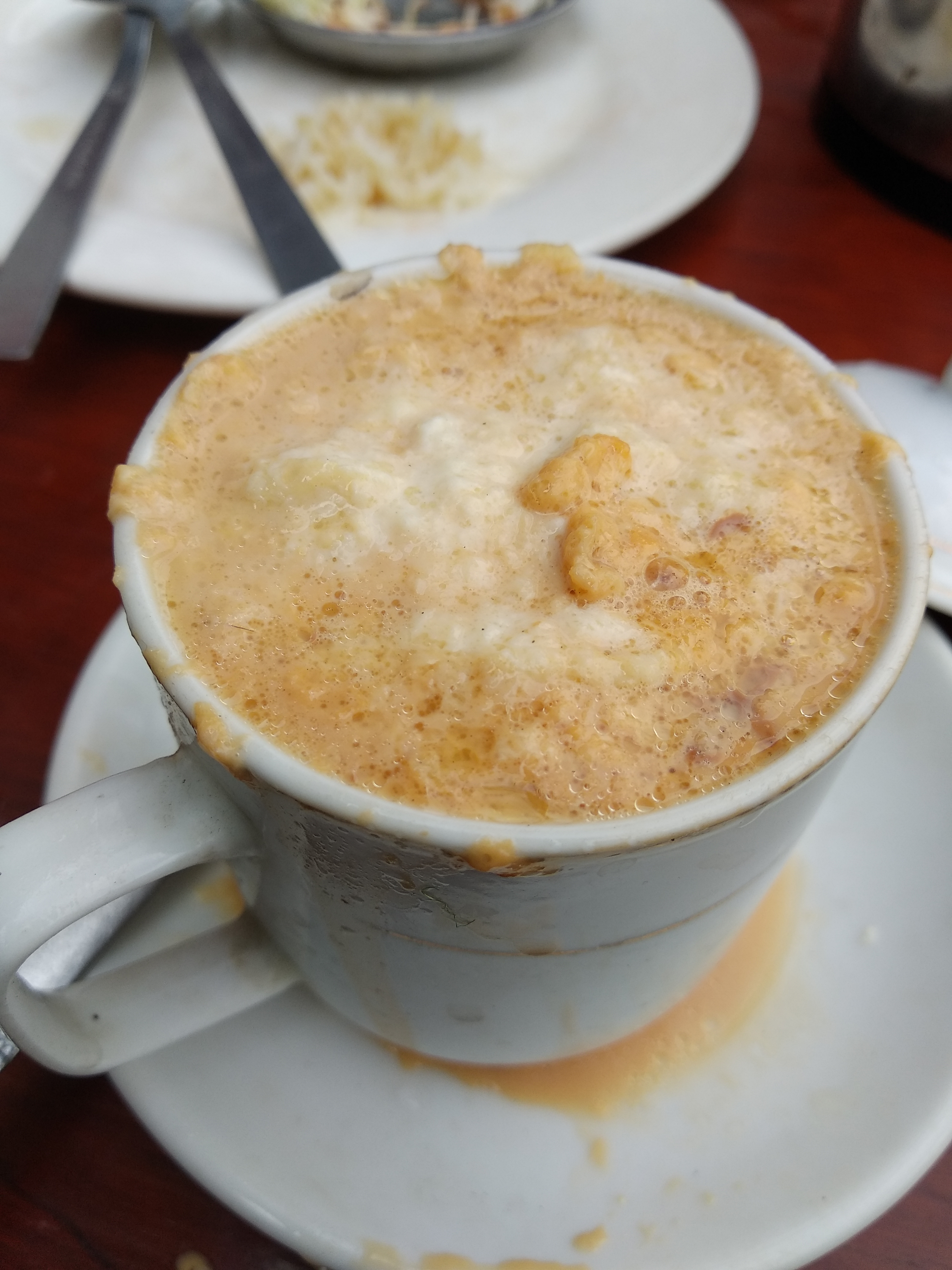
A cup of 'Ceylon tea'

Burmese milk tea is traditionally made-to-order, based on a customised ratio of tea to milk based on individual preferences. There are over two dozen varieties, and drinkers customarily use shorthand abbreviations when making their order. The varieties of milk tea can be broadly categorised based on astringency, richness, and sweetness.

=== Standard ===
Standard varieties are called pon hman (ပုံမှန်), and hover close to the ratio of 5:1:1 for brewed tea, evaporated milk and condensed milk. Some common shorthand abbreviations include 'Ceylon tea' (စီလုံတီး) and 'no zein ti' (နို့စိမ်းတီး).

=== Astringent ===
Astringent varieties are called a-phan (အဖန်) or kya kya (ကျကျ), which are typically strengthened by reducing the amount of evaporated and condensed milk and/or increasing the amount of black tea. Strongly brewed black tea without milk is called 'gate sone' (ဂိတ်ဆုံး, lit. 'final stop').

=== Rich ===
Rich varieties are called a-seint (အဆိမ့်), which are typically enriched with more evaporated milk, relative to the standard varieties. Common shorthands include 'kya seint,' 'paw seint,' and 'cho seint.'

=== Sweet ===
Sweet varieties are called a-cho (အချို), which are typically sweetened with more condensed milk, relative to standard varieties. Common shorthands include 'cho kya,' 'cho pyit,' and 'cho paw.' Another common shorthand, 'Kyaukpadaung' (ကျောက်ပန်းတောင်း), refers to a sweet but astringent brew of milk tea with reduced evaporated milk.

== See also ==
- Milk tea
- Hong Kong–style milk tea
- Teh tarik
- Milk Tea Alliance
