= Teh tarik =

Southeast Asian milk tea

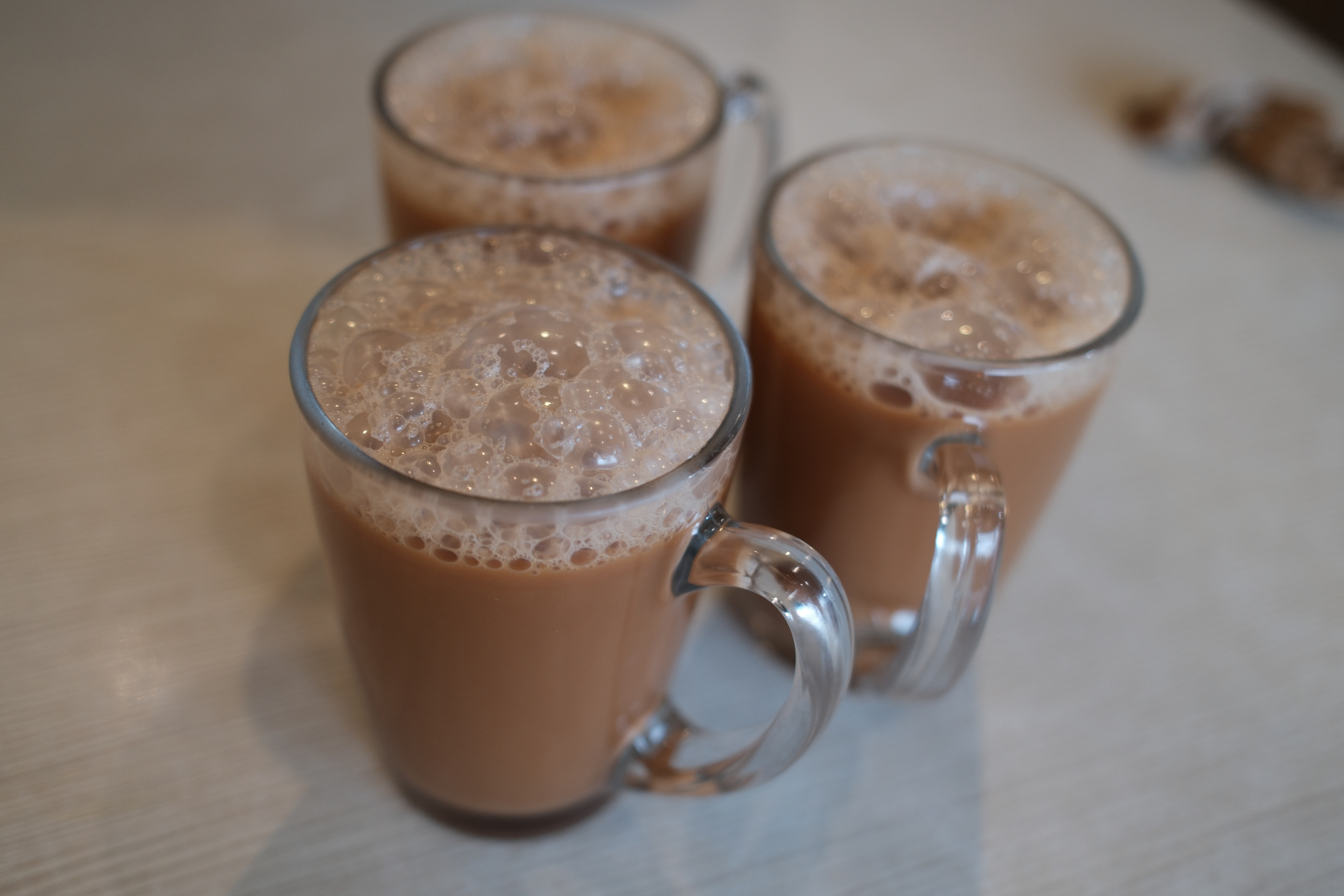
- Three glasses of teh tarik with foam on top of the drink
- Alternative names: Pulled tea
- Type: Beverage
- Region or state: Malay Peninsula
- Created by: Indian immigrants in the Malay peninsula
- Serving temperature: Hot
- Food energy (per serving): 124 kcal (520 kJ)
- Similar dishes: Milk tea, including Burmese milk tea and Hong Kong-style milk tea

Breakfast culture in Malaysia: dining experience in a multi-ethnic society
- UNESCO Intangible Cultural Heritage
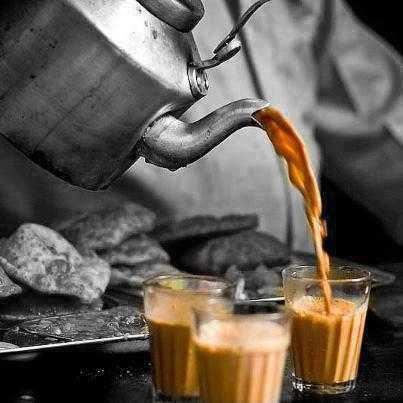
- Teh tarik poured from a kettle
- Country: Malaysia
- Reference: 02113
- Region: Asia and the Pacific

Inscription history
- Inscription: 2024 (19th session)
- List: Representative

Teh tarik (lit. 'pulled tea'; Jawi: تيه تاريق) is a hot milk tea beverage most commonly found in restaurants, outdoor stalls, mamaks and kopitiams in Malaysia, Brunei, Indonesia, Singapore, and Thailand. It is a common street drink culture in Malaysia, where it is considered the country's national drink. Its name is derived from the process of repeatedly pouring the drink back and forth from one container into another (or "pulling") with arms extended during preparation, which helps to slightly cool the tea for consumption, and gives it a frothy head. The tea is made from a strong brew of black tea blended with condensed milk. In 2024, it was designated as a Malaysian contribution to intangible cultural heritage.

== Etymology ==
The expression teh tarik is composed of the Malay words for "tea" (teh) and "pulled" (tarik), and can be translated as "pulled tea".

== History and background ==
According to an article in the BBC, black tea was first introduced by the Chinese in the 1830s; the craft of pulling was developed by South Indian street cooks after 1850, and milk and sugar were introduced nearly 100 years later during the end of British colonialism. The origins of teh tarik can be traced to Indian Muslim immigrants in the Malay Peninsula who set up drink stalls serving masala chai as early as the 1870s at the entrance of rubber plantations to serve workers there; after World War II these vendors for economic reasons switched to using tea dust, the taste of which is bitter, and added condensed milk to mask the bitterness, creating teh tarik. Singapore and Malaysia, which split in 1965, both claim it as a speciality of local cuisine. In 2024 UNESCO added Malaysian breakfast culture, including teh tarik, to the Representative List of the Intangible Cultural Heritage of Humanity alongside other Malaysian cuisine such as nasi lemak and roti canai.

== Variations ==
- Teh ais – A tea sweetened with condensed milk that is simply served in a glass with ice cubes. It may also be known as teh tarik ping, teh ping, or teh tarik ais with the "tarik" treatment.
- Teh tarik madu – Blended with honey as part of its preparation, which is usually served cold.
- Teh halia – Flavoured with ginger, it is most common within the colder regions of the Cameron Highlands of Pahang.
- Teh madras – A variant popular in Sabah and Labuan, is made with frothed milky tea layered on top of hot milk.
- Teh-C or teh si – A tea made with unsweetened evaporated milk, unlike the traditional teh tarik which is made with sweetened condensed milk. Vendors however will add sugar to Teh-C unless specifically asked not to. The Malay word for nil or zero, "kosong", is used to indicate that the drinker does not want their beverage to be sweetened. The 'C' stands for "Carnation", a popular brand of evaporated milk. A three-layered tea variation of the drink called Teh-C Peng Special is available and sold in most kopitiams especially in Sarawak, consisting of black tea, milk and palm sugar syrup from the top to bottom layer respectively. Teh-C ais is the iced drink version of it with ice cubes.
- Teh-O, also known as teh kosong – Refers to black tea without any addition of dairy products or creamers. "Kosong" means "zero" in Malay. Like teh-C, sugar is usually added, except when teh-O kosong is specified, where once again sugar is omitted. Teh O ais is the iced drink version of it, with ice cubes.
- Kopi tarik – A local coffee, dark-roasted with margarine and sugar, which is sweetened with condensed milk and pulled to froth it up. Drinks made with Milo and Nescafé may also be served with the tarik treatment by vendors who specialise in teh tarik.
- Teh hijau tarik – A variation teh tarik made of green tea, speciality drink from Aceh, Indonesia.

== Ingredients, preparation and serving ==
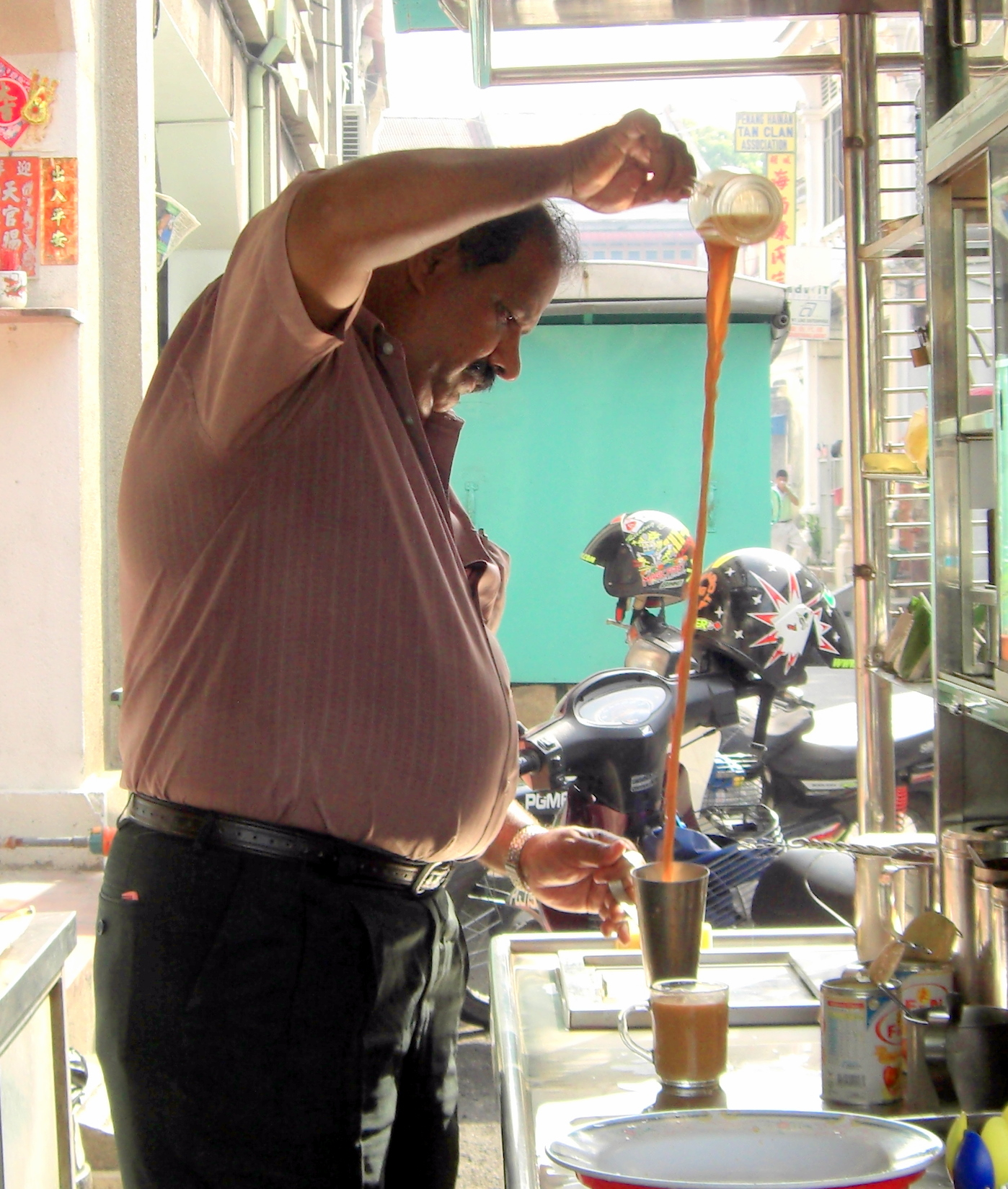
A teh tarik maker pulling the tea

Tea leaves, tea bags, or tea dust are boiled or steeped strongly and strained. Vendors may use a tea concentrate of extremely strong tea that can be combined with hot water. Evaporated and/or condensed milk are added. According to Food & Wine, lower-quality tea, such as that known as grade-B, is essential to producing traditional teh tarik. The mixture is poured back and forth repeatedly between two vessels from a height, giving it a thick frothy top. This process cools the tea to optimal drinking temperatures, thoroughly mixes the tea with the condensed milk, and is believed to improve its flavour. This is often compared to the decanting of cold brew coffee to enhance its flavour.

Since colonial times, teh tarik has been popular in Malaysian Indian cuisine for many in British Malaya and Singapore. Traditionally, teh tarik has been seen served with roti prata or roti canai as a popular breakfast among Malaysians and with prata among Singaporeans. The term kurang manis, which can be translated to "less sweet", is a common request for those who are health conscious or not fond of sugary drinks, as teh tarik is typically prepared on the sweet side to taste by most vendors. An element of showmanship exists in the serving of teh tarik. The ability to drag a long stream of tea above the heads of the patrons without giving them a shower is an amusing novelty for the locals and tourists alike. Food & Wine called it "the world's most athletic tea ritual". In Malaysia, servers who are adept at pouring the tea from further away, theatrically and seemingly in "defi[ance of] physics", become local celebrities, and pulling contests draw thousands of spectators.

== Cultural importance ==
The drink in Malaysia is seen as a symbol of navigating conflict and as a common drink popular among disparate cultural groups. It represents a symbol of harmony between different cultures of Malaysia's social demographics, especially towards the celebration of Malaysia Day. The pulled tea tradition serves as a link for social interactions across various communities in kopitiams, street vendors, markets, and urban environments, thereby strengthening cultural ties and social engagements among diverse backgrounds.

== Gallery ==
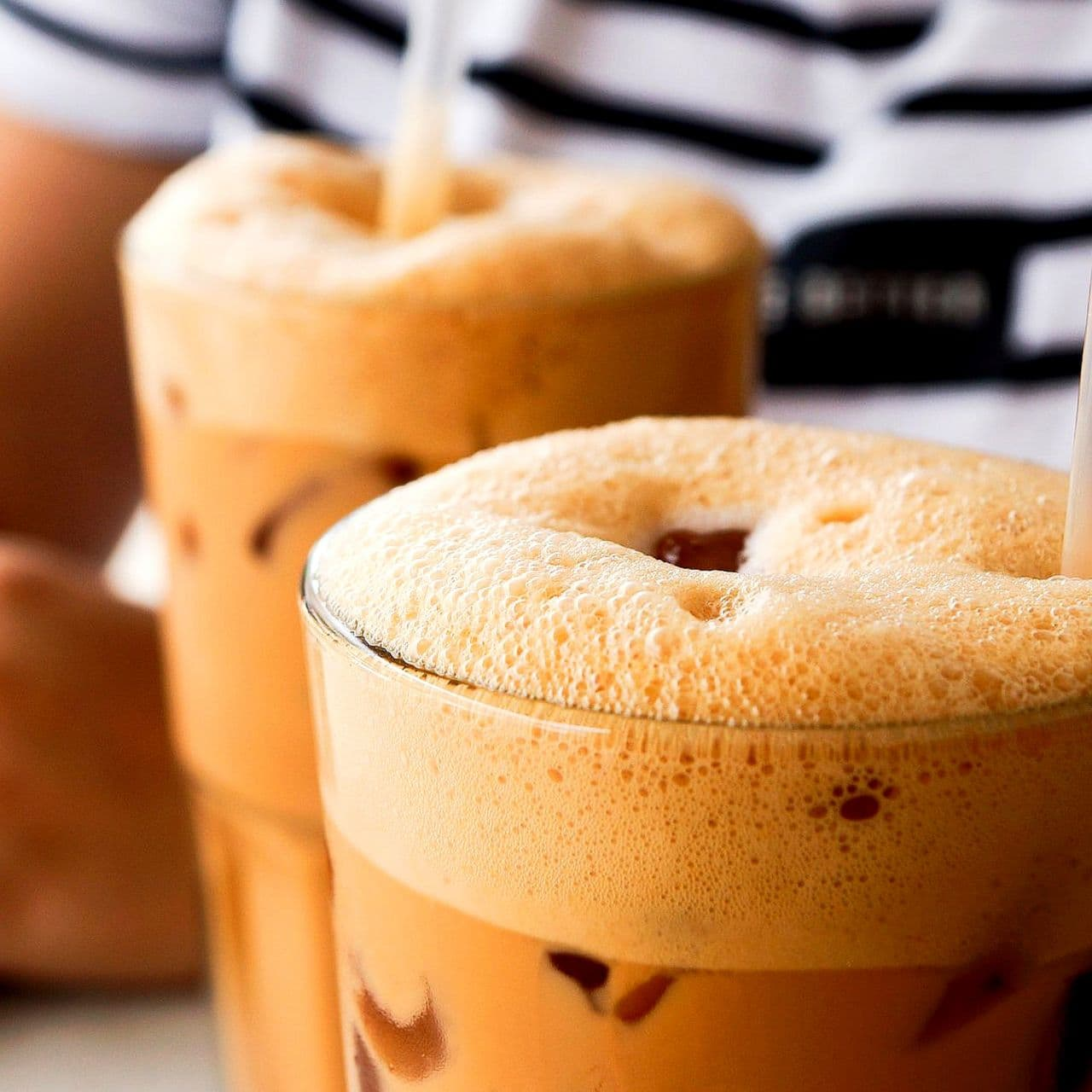
Two teh-C ais drinks

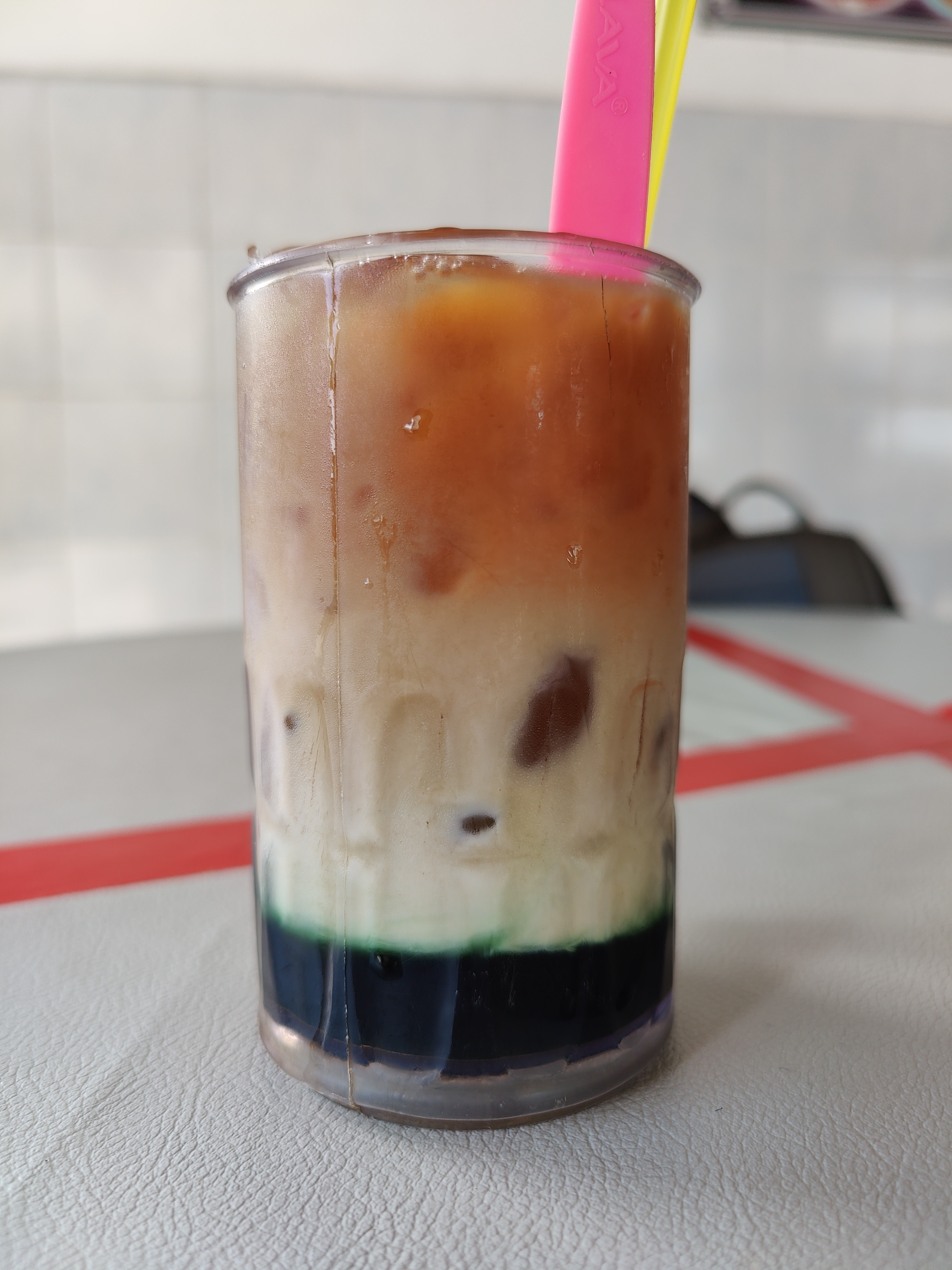
Teh-C ais special, otherwise known as teh-C peng S special; a three-layered tea drink

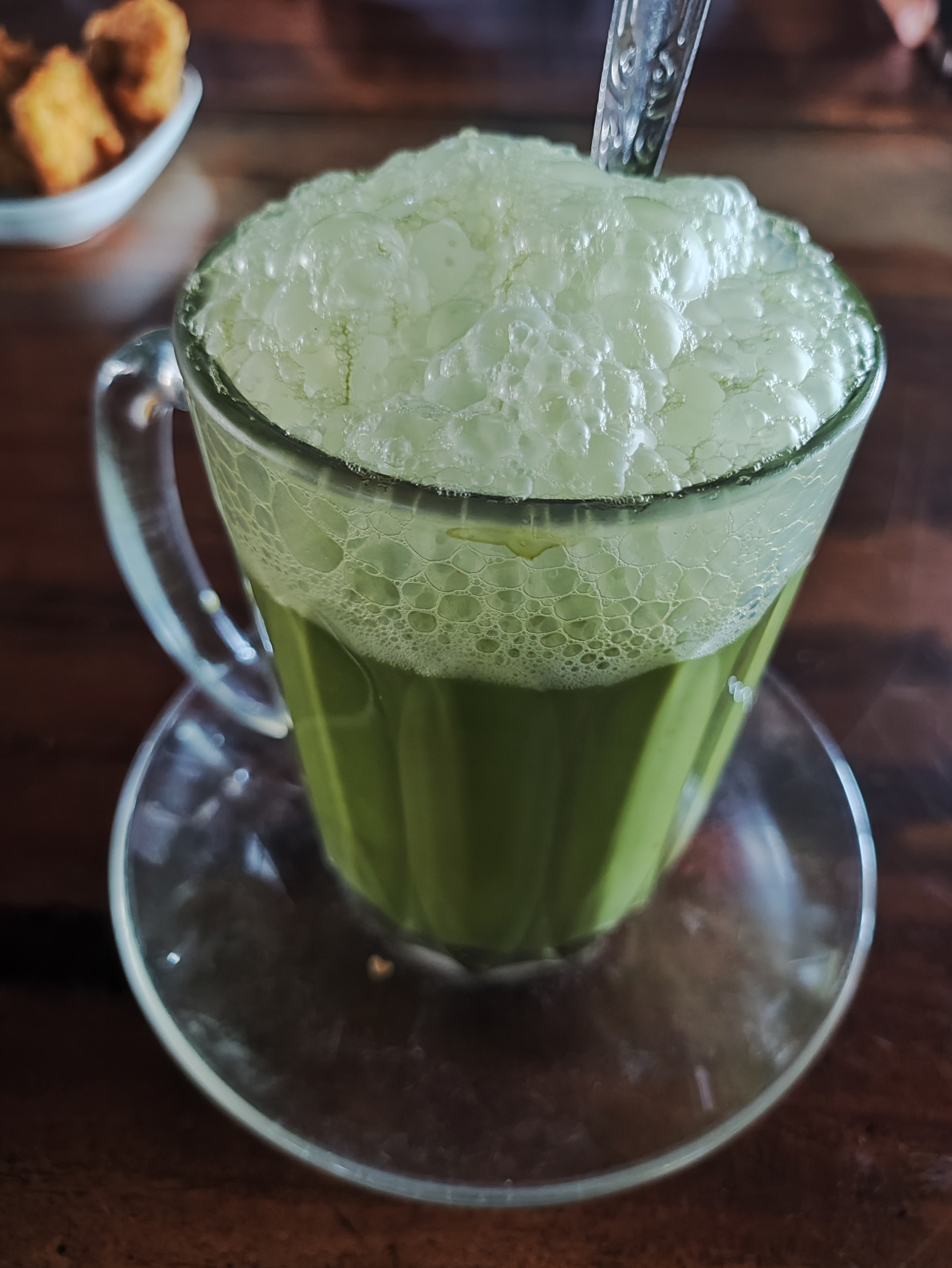
Teh hijau tarik in Banda Aceh, Indonesia

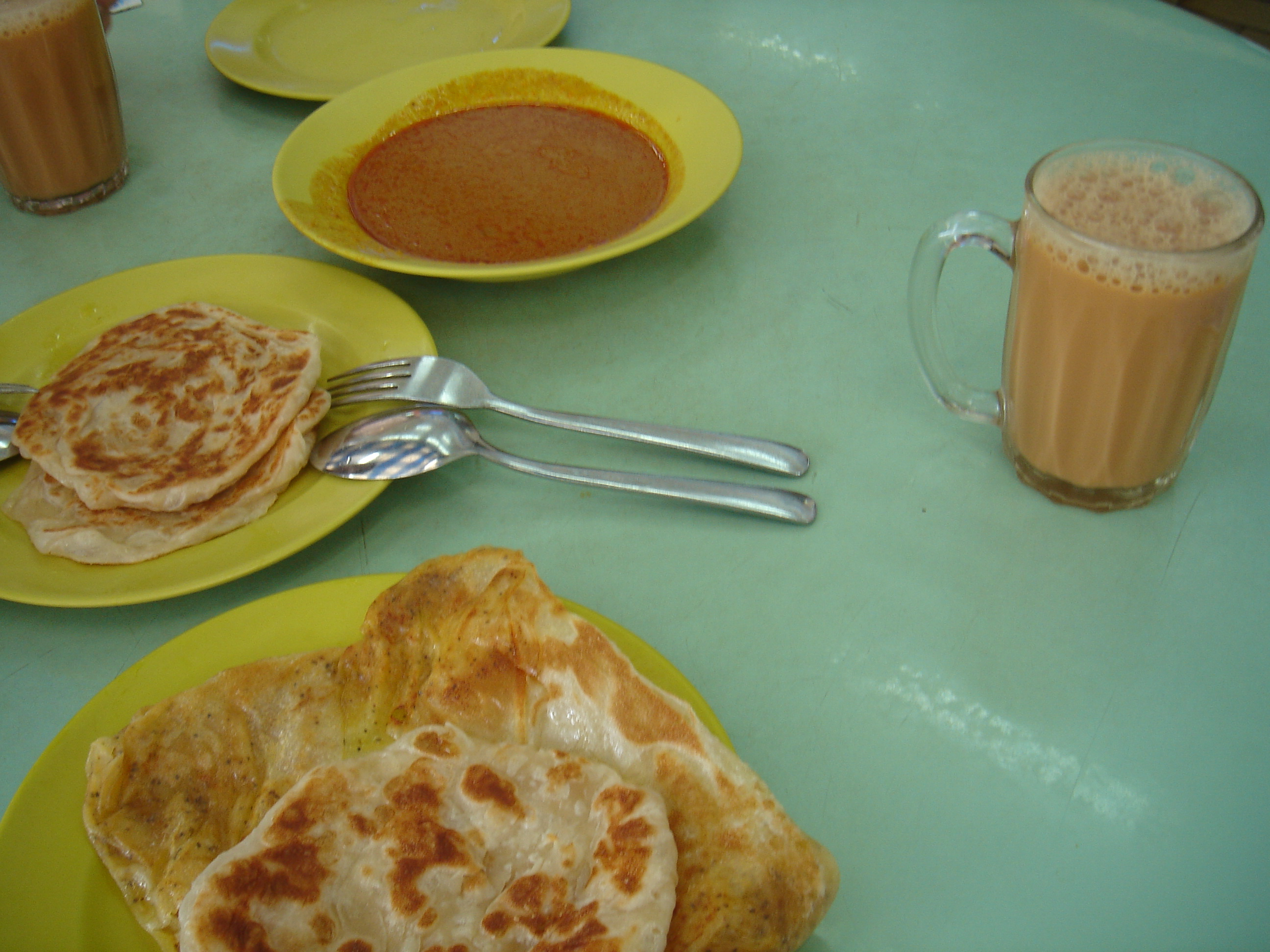
Roti prata and teh tarik at a stall in Jalan Kayu, Singapore

== See also ==
- Bubble tea
- Hong Kong-style milk tea
- Thai tea
