= Tai Hing =

Hong Kong restaurant chain

Tai Hing Group
- Company type: Public
- Traded as: SEHK: 6811
- Industry: Foodservice
- Founded: 1989
- Founder: Chan Wing-on
- Headquarters: Hong Kong
- Number of locations: 191 (2019)
- Area served: Hong Kong, Macau, Mainland China, Taiwan
- Owner: Chan Wing-on (51.2%)
- Website: www.taihing.com

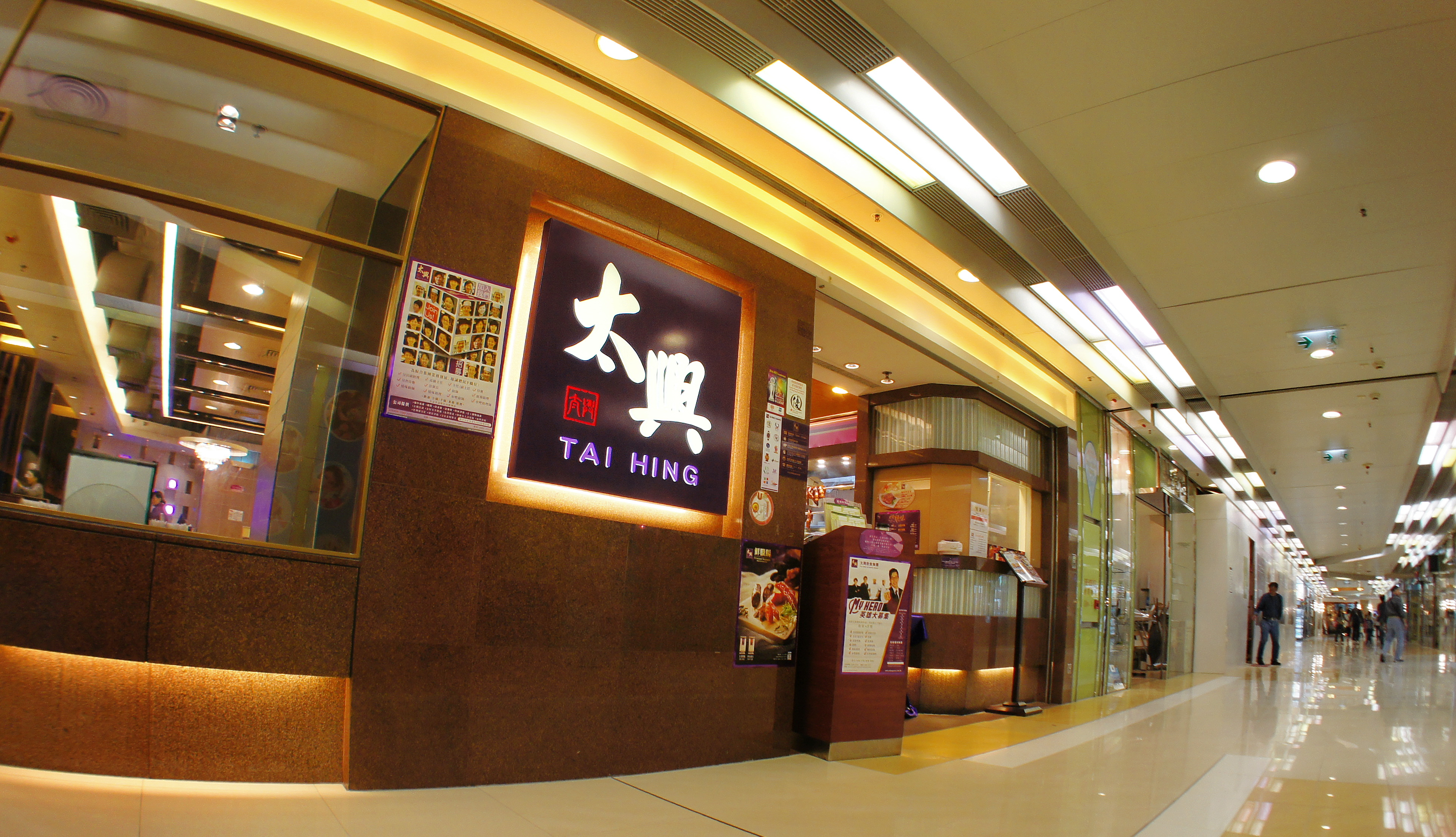
Tai Hing Restaurant in The Pacifica Mall, Cheung Sha Wan

Tai Hing Group (Chinese: 太興集團) is a restaurant chain in Hong Kong. It was listed on the Hong Kong Stock Exchange in June 2019. The company was founded in 1989. As of May 2019, it operates 9 brands, with a total of 191 branches, of which 126 are in Hong Kong and 63 are in mainland China. In 2018, the company had a net margin of 4.9%.
