= Thai tea =

Thai drink made from tea, milk and sugar

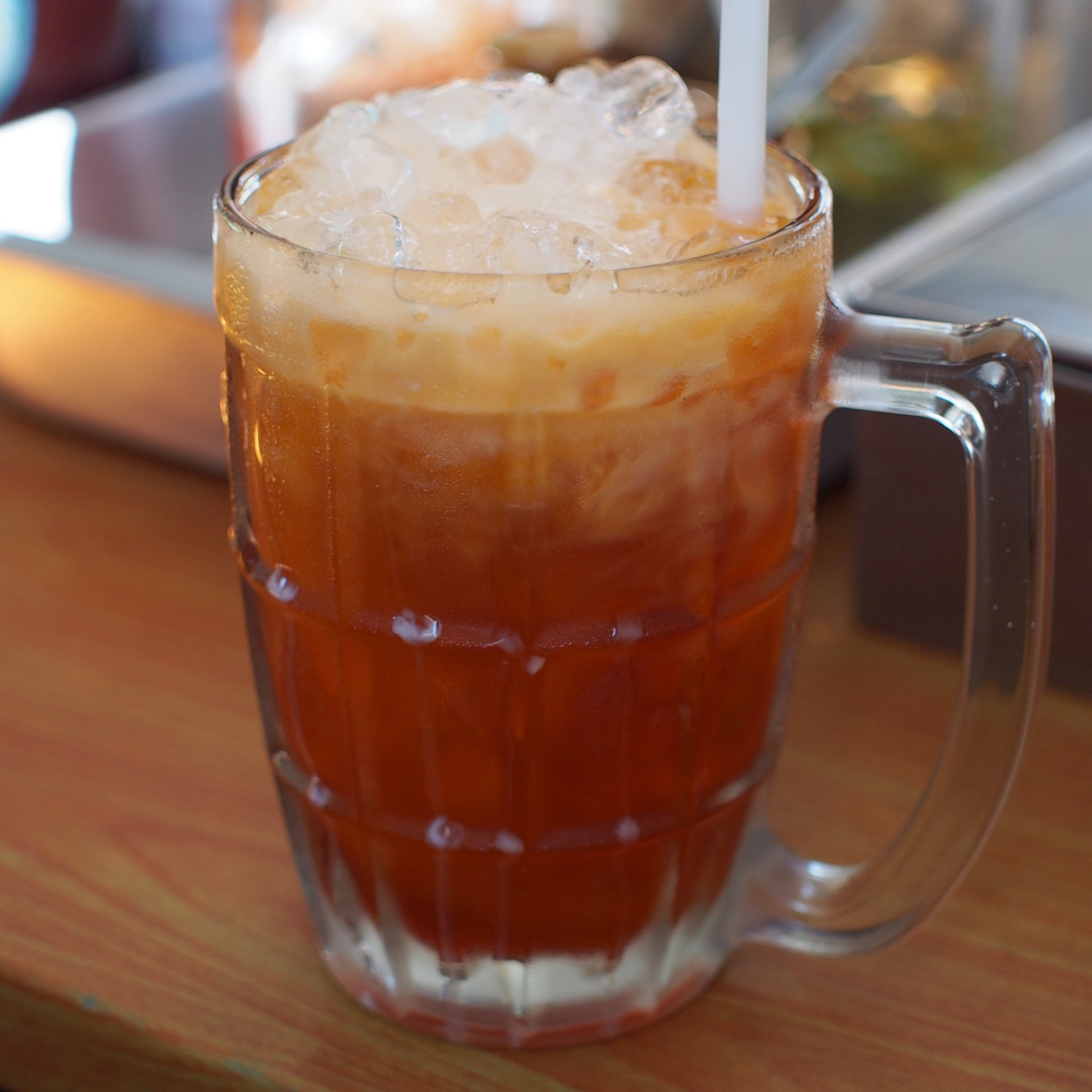
- Thai iced tea as served in an eatery in Thailand
- Alternative names: Cha yen (ชาเย็น); Thai iced tea
- Type: Tea-based beverage
- Place of origin: Thailand
- Region or state: Southeast Asia
- Associated cuisine: Thai cuisine
- Main ingredients: Black tea, sugar, milk

Thai tea (Thai: ชาไทย, RTGS: cha thai, pronounced [t͡ɕʰāː tʰāj]) is a Thai drink made from Ceylon black tea, milk, and sugar. Thai tea as consumed in Thailand is not typically brewed with spices, though many English language recipes inspired by Thai tea include ingredients such as star anise or cardamom to enhance the flavor. It is served either hot or cold. Thai tea is popular in Southeast Asia and is served in many restaurants that serve Thai food. When served cold it is known as Thai iced tea (ชาเย็น, cha yen, [t͡ɕʰāː jēn]; lit. 'cold tea'). Although Thai tea normally refers to Thai iced tea, there are also other kinds of tea which can be referred to as Thai tea. For instance, the Thai traditional herbal tea which is formulated based on Thai traditional medicine can also be called Thai tea. Thai Oolong tea, which is oolong tea steamed with ginger (Zingiber officinale), lemongrass (Cymbopogon citratus), and celery, can also be referred to as Thai tea. Its bright orange colour usually comes from added food colouring, often Sunset Yellow FCF, rather than from the tea itself. The modern Thai tea trade is closely associated with the brand ChaTraMue, which traces its roots to a shop that imported tea from China and adopted its present name in 1945.

== Etymology ==
In Thai, cha (ชา) refers to a small tropical tree whose young leaves are dried and brewed as a drink. The Thai word cha is borrowed from Mandarin Chinese chá (ฉา); some other languages, such as English with tea, follow the Teochew pronunciation instead. The iced version of the drink is commonly called cha yen (ชาเย็น), where yen (เย็น) means "cold"; the Royal Society describes cha yen as tea brewed with milk, sugar and ice, and cha dam yen (ชาดำเย็น) as tea brewed with sugar and ice. Another source likewise distinguishes tea with milk (cha yen) from tea without milk (cha dam yen).

== History ==
=== Early tea contact and tea shops in Bangkok ===
Tea was introduced to Thailand from China through long-standing trade contact. Accounts by European visitors show that tea drinking was known in the Ayutthaya kingdom: in 1685 the French priest de Choisy wrote of buying good tea in the market to brew, and in 1687 Simon de La Loubère recorded that Thais drank tea hot and unsweetened in the Chinese manner and served it to guests.

Tea leaves were also eaten as food: the northern Thai fermented tea-leaf snack miang predates the consumption of tea as an iced drink. ChaTraMue likewise says that tea leaves in Thailand were originally used mostly in local dishes.

=== Iced tea and the ChaTraMue brand ===
According to ChaTraMue, its history began with a shop called Lim Meng Kee, which imported tea from China, and the brand name ChaTraMue, meaning "Number One Brand Thai Tea", was adopted in 1945, which the company recognises as its official founding year. The company's producer, Cha Thai International, says that over time Thai people began making their own version of the imported tea, which developed into what is now known as Thai tea.

The precise origins of the drink now called Thai tea are not well documented, and one academic study found that its development appears unrelated to the consumption of oolong tea in Thailand. The same authors compare it to a tea still consumed in Burma, noting that in Thailand it is preferred cold, and speculate that the addition of milk may reflect Western influence, possibly introduced during the era of Field Marshal Plaek Phibunsongkhram, who favoured Western customs. Food writers likewise describe the origin as uncertain, mentioning speculation about British tea customs in the early 1800s and about servants flavouring leftover tea leaves, but noting that little documentation exists.

== Botany and cultivation ==
=== Assamica variety in northern Thailand ===
Two tea varieties are grown in northern Thailand: Assam tea (Camellia sinensis var. assamica) and Chinese tea, with Assam leaves being larger.

=== Growing regions ===
Thailand has grown tea for more than 60 years, mainly in the northern provinces. In 2004 the country's total tea plantation area was 75,056 rai (about 12,000 hectares) producing 43,333 tonnes, of which Chiang Rai accounted for 46,783 rai and 20,404 tonnes, Chiang Mai for 20,065 rai and 8,646 tonnes, Lampang for 4,753 rai and 8,150 tonnes, Phrae for 2,600 rai and 4,810 tonnes, and Mae Hong Son for 855 rai and 1,323 tonnes.

== Ingredients and production ==
=== Tea and flavourings ===
The drink is made from strongly brewed Ceylon tea, or a locally grown landrace (traditional or semi-wild) version of Assam known as bai miang (ใบเมี่ยง). Black tea is fully fermented (oxidised) tea. Sources differ on whether the tea is spiced: Commins and Sampanvejsobha describe it as made from a native red-leafed tea spiced with star anise seed, while a Thaiger guide says it is primarily made from Ceylon black tea, with spices such as anise, tamarind seeds, cassia bark and orange blossom water. Another source lists flavourings that may be used, including orange blossom water, tamarind, vanilla and cinnamon.

The tea is sweetened with sugar and condensed milk.

=== Brewing ===
One recipe article describes brewing Thai tea powder by placing it in a tea filter bag and pouring hot water through the bag back and forth about four to five times, then letting the tea rest for one to two minutes before adding milk. A "pulling" technique, in which the tea is poured between containers as in teh tarik, is also used in preparing the drink.

=== Serving ===
Thai iced tea is usually served cold over ice. Evaporated milk or whole milk is poured over the tea and ice before serving to add taste and a creamy appearance. In one recipe the brewed tea is mixed with sweetened condensed milk, poured over a glass of crushed ice and topped with a little more evaporated milk. The classic serving has also been described as a spiced, bright orange tea poured over ice with a generous amount of evaporated milk. In Thai restaurants, it is served in a tall glass, but when sold from street and market stalls in Thailand it may be poured over crushed ice in a plastic bag or tall plastic cups. It may also be made into a frappé at some vendors. Tapioca pearls can be added to Thai tea to make bubble tea.

=== Colour ===
Thai iced tea gets its characteristic orange colour from food colouring; the exact time and reason it was first added is unclear. One theory holds that colouring was added so that the tea, brewed from Ceylon tea and therefore beige like coffee, would be easy to tell apart from coffee drinks. The colour often comes from synthetic dyes such as FD&C Yellow No. 6, also known as Sunset Yellow FCF.

== Variations of Thai tea ==
=== Cold ===
- Dark Thai iced tea (ชาดำเย็น, cha dam yen, [t͡ɕʰāː dām jēn]) – Thai tea served chilled without milk, sweetened with sugar only. The concept is based on traditional Indian tea, which is used as a main ingredient.
- Lime Thai tea (ชามะนาว, cha manao, [t͡ɕʰāː mā.nāːw]) – Similar to dark Thai iced tea, but flavored with lime and sweetened with sugar. Mint may also be added.

=== Hot ===
In Thailand, Thai hot tea is often drunk in the morning, frequently with pathongko (ปาท่องโก๋, long strips of fried dough):

- Thai hot tea (ชาร้อน, cha ron, [t͡ɕʰāː rɔ́ːn]) – Thai tea with sugar and milk content, served hot.
- Dark Thai hot tea (ชาดำร้อน, cha dam ron, [t͡ɕʰāː dām rɔ́ːn]) – Thai tea served hot without milk, sweetened with sugar only.

== Culture and popularity ==
=== Popularity and preferences ===
Thai iced tea is typically made with strong black tea and evaporated milk, and in Thailand it is preferred cold. A 2025 survey found that most respondents had already tried Thai tea and that a majority preferred it less sweet when drinking it in the afternoon. Respondents also considered Thai tea well known abroad and said they would support making it Thailand's official national beverage.

=== Cha chak (pulled tea) ===
In the pulled-tea style, the tea is poured repeatedly between two cups, which cools and aerates it and is said to improve its flavour; the method is described as derived from Malaysia, where it is known as teh tarik.

Cha chak is also a popular drink among Muslims in southern Thailand, especially in Pattani, where it is presented as part of the region's Malay-Muslim culture. In one Pattani account, strongly brewed tea is strained, mixed in a cup with milk and condensed milk, and poured back and forth between two cups two or three times to form a foam; it is often served warm with roti.

== Economy and industry ==
=== Market structure and trade ===
ChaTraMue is the dominant brand of Thai tea, and has popularized the tea internationally. Entry-level mass-market tea in Thailand starts at around 50 baht per cup, and competition has intensified as more Thai and Chinese brands enter the market. According to ChaTraMue's managing director, Thai consumers' tea preferences have broadened over the past five years toward a wider variety of flavours, such as matcha.

=== International expansion of Thai tea brands ===
ChaTraMue has said it plans to expand into new international markets, including Canada, Laos, Mexico and Indonesia, and to launch a "colourless" Thai tea and a naturally coloured Thai tea. Thai iced tea has also spread from Thai street food to restaurants and homes abroad, where some venues add ingredients such as rooibos and cocoa husks.

== See also ==
- ChaTraMue
- Hong Kong–style milk tea
- Teh tarik
- Bubble tea
