= List of coffeehouse chains =

This list of notable coffeehouse chains catalogues the spread and markets share of coffeehouses world-wide. This list excludes the many companies which operate coffeeshops within retail establishments, notably bookstores and department stores, or restaurants or convenience stores which also serve coffee.

These chains frequently engage in coffee wars to gain brand and consumer market share. Starbucks, Luckin Coffee and Dunkin' are the three largest coffee companies in the world, respectively.

The largest coffee houses typically have substantial supply-chain relations with the world's major coffee-producing countries. They collectively wield prominent influence in global coffee economics by setting commodity prices, maintaining value chains, and supporting developing economics.

== List ==
Name	Country founded in	Number of locations	Notes
% Arabica	Hong Kong	236	
321 Coffee	United States	5	Based in the Research Triangle area of North Carolina, U.S.
5 to go	Romania	650+	Based in Bucharest, Romania, with branches throughout Romania and Hungary.
7 Brew	United States	500	Found throughout the U.S. but not internationally, drive-thru only
85C Bakery Cafe	Taiwan	994	Based in Taichung, Taiwan; international branches in Hong Kong, Australia, U.S. and China.
Aida	Austria	28	
AMT Coffee	United Kingdom	14	Mostly at railway stations
ANGELINUS	South Korea	600+	China, Indonesia, South Korea, and Vietnam
Arcaffe	Israel	55	Israel and France
Aroma Café	United Kingdom	15+	UK, Argentina, Brazil
Aroma Espresso Bar	Israel	140+	Israel, Canada, U.S., Romania, Ukraine, Kazakhstan
Aroma Joe's	United States	100+	Headquartered in Portland, Maine
Au Bon Pain	United States	171	Headquartered in Boston, Massachusetts, U.S.
Barista	India	221	India, Sri Lanka, Maldives
Barista Coffee	Taiwan	15	
Bewley's	Ireland	1+	Based in Dublin, operates Rebecca's Cafe and Java City in the U.S.
Biggby Coffee	United States	300+	Based in East Lansing, Michigan, U.S.
Black Sheep Coffee	United Kingdom	130+	UK, France, Philippines, U.S.
Blank Street Coffee	United States		
Blenz Coffee	Canada	65	
Blue Bottle Coffee	United States	100+	U.S., Japan, South Korea, Hong Kong
Bootlegger	South Africa	80+	South Africa
Bo's Coffee	Philippines	103	Philippines, Qatar, United Arab Emirates
Boston Tea Party	United Kingdom	22	Mainly South West England
Bourbon Coffee	Rwanda	4	
Bridgehead Coffee	Canada	20	Fair trade chain in Ottawa, Ontario
Brown Coffee	Cambodia	39	
Café Amazon	Thailand	5000+	A subsidiary of PTT, based in Bangkok, Thailand. Area served: Thailand, Cambodia, Laos, Philippines, Myanmar, Oman, Singapore, Japan, Malaysia, China, and Vietnam.
Cafe Barbera	Italy	53	
Café Café	Israel	151	
Café Coffee Day	India	550	India, Czech Republic, Malaysia, Nepal, and Egypt
Café Hillel	Israel	25+	
Cafe!n	Taiwan	24	Based in Taipei, Taiwan
Caffe Bene	South Korea	1,378	Cambodia, China, Indonesia, Malaysia, Mongolia, Philippines, Saudi Arabia, South Korea, Taiwan, U.S., and Vietnam
Caffè-Pasticceria Cova	Italy	35	Milan, Italy; Hong Kong, Japan; Celebrity Cruises
Caffè Nero	United Kingdom	1,026	UK, Cyprus, Ireland, Poland, Sweden, Turkey, UAE, US
Caffè Pascucci	Italy		Founded in Italy, has locations in over 25 countries
Caffè Ritazza	United Kingdom	119	40 countries, mostly at railway stations
Caffe Trieste	United States	6	In the San Francisco Bay Area, California, U.S.
Caffeine	Lithuania	140	Lithuania, Latvia, Estonia, Norway, Denmark
Caffé Vita Coffee Roasting Company	United States	12	Seattle, Washington, U.S.
Cama Café	Taiwan	160	Based in Taipei, Taiwan
Caribou Coffee	United States	725	Global, headquartered in Brooklyn Center, Minnesota, U.S.
Cibo Espresso	Australia	30	
The Coffee Bean & Tea Leaf	United States	1,000+	U.S., India, Malaysia, Pakistan, Philippines, Bangladesh, South Korea, Singapore, Israel, Sri Lanka
Coffee Beanery	United States	120+	Based in Flushing, Michigan, U.S.
The Coffee Club	Australia	410+	Australia, Maldives, Malaysia, New Zealand, Thailand, New Caledonia, China, Egypt
Coffee Fellows	Germany	140+	Germany, Austria, Benelux, Texas
The Coffee House	Vietnam	152	
Coffee Island	Greece	459	Greece, Cyprus, United Kingdom, Canada, UAE, Switzerland, Romania, Egypt, Spain, India, Iraq, France
Coffee Like	Russia	497	
Coffee Republic	United Kingdom	129	UK, Southeast Europe, Middle East
Coffee Time	Canada	100+	
Coffee World	Thailand	100+	Founded in Bangkok, Thailand; has locations in nine countries
Coffee#1	United Kingdom	57	
Coffine Gurunaru	South Korea	120+	
Cofix	Israel	430	
Colectivo Coffee Roasters	United States	20	Headquartered in Milwaukee, Wisconsin, United States. Formerly known as Alterra Coffee Roasters.
Compass Coffee	United States	19	Headquartered in Washington, D.C.
Compose Coffee	South Korea	2,612	
Cộng Cà Phê	Vietnam	100+	
Costa Coffee	United Kingdom	3,401	Global headquartered in Loudwater, High Wycombe, Buckinghamshire with locations in 50 countries including the UK, Pakistan, Ireland, Germany, Hungary, France, Spain, Portugal, Poland, Bulgaria, Cyprus, China, India, UAE, Qatar and more
Cotti Coffee	China	10,000	China
Country Style	Canada	400	Headquartered in Richmond Hill, Ontario, Canada
Crazy Mocha Coffee Company	United States	29	Based in Pittsburgh, Pennsylvania
Dante Coffee	Taiwan	20	
Dôme	Australia	65+	Based in Perth, Australia
Double Coffee	Latvia	40	Based in Latvia; 40 locations in the Baltic states, Ukraine, and Belarus
Doutor Coffee	Japan	1,300+	Japan, Taiwan and Malaysia
Dunkin'	United States	11,000+	Global, based in Quincy, Massachusetts, U.S.
Dunn Brothers Coffee	United States	79	Founded in St. Paul, Minnesota, U.S.
Dutch Bros. Coffee	United States	912	Based in Grants Pass, Oregon, U.S.
Ecoffee	Taiwan	100+	based in Taiwan, locations in China and Singapore
Ediya Coffee	South Korea	3,900+ as of 2024	
Espresso House	Sweden	510	based in Sweden, locations in Norway, Finland, Denmark and Germany
Espresso Vivace	United States	3	Seattle, Washington, U.S.
Espressolab	Turkey	150	Turkey, Germany, Portugal, Egypt, Qatar, Jordan, Morocco, South Africa, the UAE, Cyprus, and Iraq
Esquires	Canada	130+	Canada, Britain and Ireland, New Zealand, Australia, Pakistan and Middle East
Figaro Coffee	Philippines	55	Philippines-based chain of coffee shops and restaurants, with outlets in Fiji, Papua New Guinea, Saudi Arabia, and Vietnam
Filli Cafe	United Arab Emirates	100+	Dubai-based café chain best known for its signature Zafran Tea
Flocafé	Greece	45	Greece, Bulgaria, Egypt, United Kingdom, Hungary, Qatar, Netherlands
Fore Coffee	Indonesia	217	Indonesia, Singapore.
Gimme! Coffee	United States	5	
Gloria Jean's Coffees	United States	1,000+	Australia, Azerbaijan, Cyprus, India, Bangladesh, Malaysia, New Zealand, Pakistan, Philippines, Vietnam, Cambodia, Sri Lanka, Thailand, Taiwan, Ukraine, and United States. Its headquarters are now in Australia. Keurig Dr Pepper owns the North American non-coffeehouse retail rights for this brand.
Greggs	United Kingdom	2,000+	
Gregory's	Greece	339	Greece, Cyprus, Romania, Germany
Grounds for Coffee	United States	7	
Havanna	Argentina	230	
Heart Coffee Roasters	United States	3	
Highlands Coffee	Vietnam	819 (Number in Oct 2024)	Vietnam, Philippines
Hollys	South Korea	538 as of 2018	
Hudsons Coffee	Australia	70	
The Human Bean	United States	200+	Founded in Oregon, U.S.
Illy Caffè	Italy	160	
Indian Coffee House	India	400	
Insomnia Coffee Company	Ireland	175	Locations in Ireland and the UK, with over 500 self service docks
Intelligentsia Coffee & Tea	United States	15	U.S. and South Korea
J.CO Donuts	Indonesia	236	Indonesia, Singapore, Malaysia, Philippines, Saudi Arabia, and Hong Kong
Jamaica Blue	Australia	134	A franchise business of Foodco which operates small coffee shops throughout the Australia, New Zealand, UK, China, Malaysia, Singapore and United Arab Emirates
Java House	Kenya	103	Headquartered in Nairobi, chain selling export quality Kenyan coffee
Jittery Joe's	United States	14	
Joe & The Juice	Denmark	382	
Juan Valdez Café	Colombia	300	Headquarters in Colombia; coffee shops in South America, North America, Middle East, East Asia, and the Caribbean
Kaffebrenneriet	Norway	41	
Kaladi Brothers Coffee	United States	15	Based in Alaska, U.S.
Killiney	Singapore	48	Singapore, Malaysia, Indonesia, Australia, and U.S.
Komeda Coffee	Japan	1000+	Japan, China, Taiwan, Hong Kong and Indonesia
Kopi Janji Jiwa	Indonesia	900+ (as of 2025)	Indonesia
Kopi Kenangan	Indonesia	1,351 (as of 2026)	Singapore, Malaysia, Indonesia, and the Philippines
Krispy Kreme	United States	1,005	Global, based in Winston-Salem, North Carolina
La Colombe	United States	32	U.S. only
Leonidas Cafe	United States	4	Chicago and the northern suburbs, Illinois, U.S.
Lollicup Coffee & Tea	United States	38	U.S. and China
Louisa Coffee	Taiwan	489	
Luckin Coffee	China	30,000 (as of February 6, 2026)	China, Singapore, and the United States
Maan Coffee	China		
Maman (Café)	United States	37 (as of June 2024)	U.S. and Canada
McCafé	Australia		Owned by McDonald's
Mega MGC Coffee	South Korea	3,000+	
Michel's Patisserie	Australia	360	
Mikel Coffee Company	Greece	403	Greece, Cyprus, United Arab Emirates, United Kingdom, Bulgaria, Saudi Arabia, Canada, Turkey, North Macedonia, Kuwait, Oman, Jordan, Germany, Iraq, Serbia, Georgia, Kosovo, Egypt and Albania
mmmuffins	Canada	5	
Mr. Brown Coffee	Taiwan	55	
Mugg & Bean	South Africa	322+	South Africa, Botswana, Kenya, and the United Arab Emirates
Muzz Buzz	Australia	100+	
My Kopi-O!	Indonesia	31	
Nedelya	Bulgaria	57	Locations in Bulgaria and Romania
North End	Bangladesh	14	Based in Bangladesh
O' Coffee Club	Singapore	33	Singapore, Malaysia, and Indonesia
OldTown White Coffee	Malaysia	245	Malaysia, Singapore, Indonesia, Cambodia, Hong Kong, China, and Myanmar
Onyx Coffee Lab	United States	8	Locations in Northwest Arkansas, United States
Pacific Coffee	Hong Kong	120	Based in Hong Kong, with branches in Singapore, Cyprus, China, and Malaysia
Paris Baguette	South Korea	3,558	Based in Seoul, South Korea, with branches in the U.S., Singapore, China, and Vietnam
Paul Bassett	South Korea	93	
Peet's Coffee	United States	200+	Founded in Berkeley, California, U.S.
Philz Coffee	United States	71	
Pickup Coffee	Philippines	700+	Philippines and Mexico
PJ's Coffee	United States	170	Based in New Orleans, Louisiana, U.S.
Platō Coffee	South Africa	130+	Southern Africa
Port City Java	United States	25+	
Pret a Manger	United Kingdom	450+	UK, U.S., Hong Kong, France, Dubai, Kuwait, Germany, Switzerland, Belgium, Ireland, Canada, and Singapore.
Raees Coffee	Iran	7	
Revelator Coffee	United States	22	Southern United States
Ritual Coffee Roasters	United States	6	San Francisco, California, U.S.
Robin's Donuts	Canada	160+	
Seattle	South Africa	297	South Africa and Namibia
Seattle's Best Coffee	United States		Nestlé owns this brand. US locations have failed or have been converted to Starbucks when Starbucks owned this brand. This brand's franchising rights for coffeehouses in non-United States markets and in United States military bases are owned by Focus Brands, and is still active in those markets.
Second Cup	Canada	300+	Canada, Cyprus and Pakistan
Secret Recipe	Malaysia	440+	Malaysia, Singapore, Indonesia, Thailand, China, Bangladesh, Brunei, Cambodia and Myanmar
Simit Sarayı	Turkey	426	
Scooter's Coffee	United States	651+	
SPoT Coffee	United States	10	Locations in Canada and U.S.
SPR Coffee	China	545	China, Taiwan
Starbucks	United States	33,833	Global, headquartered in Seattle, Washington, U.S.
Stumptown Coffee Roasters	United States	14	U.S., headquartered in Portland, Oregon
Tchibo	Germany	1,000+	
Tim Hortons	Canada	4,613	Based in Toronto; owned by Restaurant Brands International, which does have a headquarters in Canada — but is a Brazilian investment company called 3G Capital. Also owns Bess Eaton. Locations in Canada, U.S., U.K., Pakistan, Ireland, the Philippines and several Gulf countries.
Timothy's World Coffee	Canada	40	
Tom N Toms	South Korea	410+	
Tomoro Coffee	Indonesia	600+	Indonesia, China, Singapore, and the Philippines.
Tomoca Coffee	Ethiopia	22	Based in Addis Ababa, it is known for Italian-style coffee made with Ethiopian arabica beans.
Tully's Coffee	United States		This brand was purchased by Keurig Dr Pepper, and its United States coffeehouse business licensed the brand back. The USA coffeehouse business eventually liquidated. A separate company has purchased this brand in Japan, and that coffeehouse chain continues to operate.
A Twosome Place	South Korea	1,069 as of 2018	
Vida e Caffè	South Africa	320+	South Africa, Botswana, Mauritius, Ghana, Angola, Zambia, and Eswatini
Výtopna	Czech Republic	5	
Wayne's Coffee	Sweden	140+	Locations throughout Europe and scattered in Asia, mostly in Vietnam
WCafe	South Africa	220+	Southern Africa
Woods Coffee	United States	18	Washington, U.S.
Ya Kun Kaya Toast	Singapore	50+	Chain of kopitiams based in Singapore
Zarraffa's Coffee	Australia	88+	
Ziferblat	Russia	16+	First "pay-as-you-go cafe"
Zus Coffee	Malaysia	360	Malaysia, Philippines

== See also ==
- Coffee wars
- List of bakery cafés
- List of coffee companies
- List of doughnut shops
- Lists of restaurants
