= Ecoffee =

Taiwanese coffeehouse chain

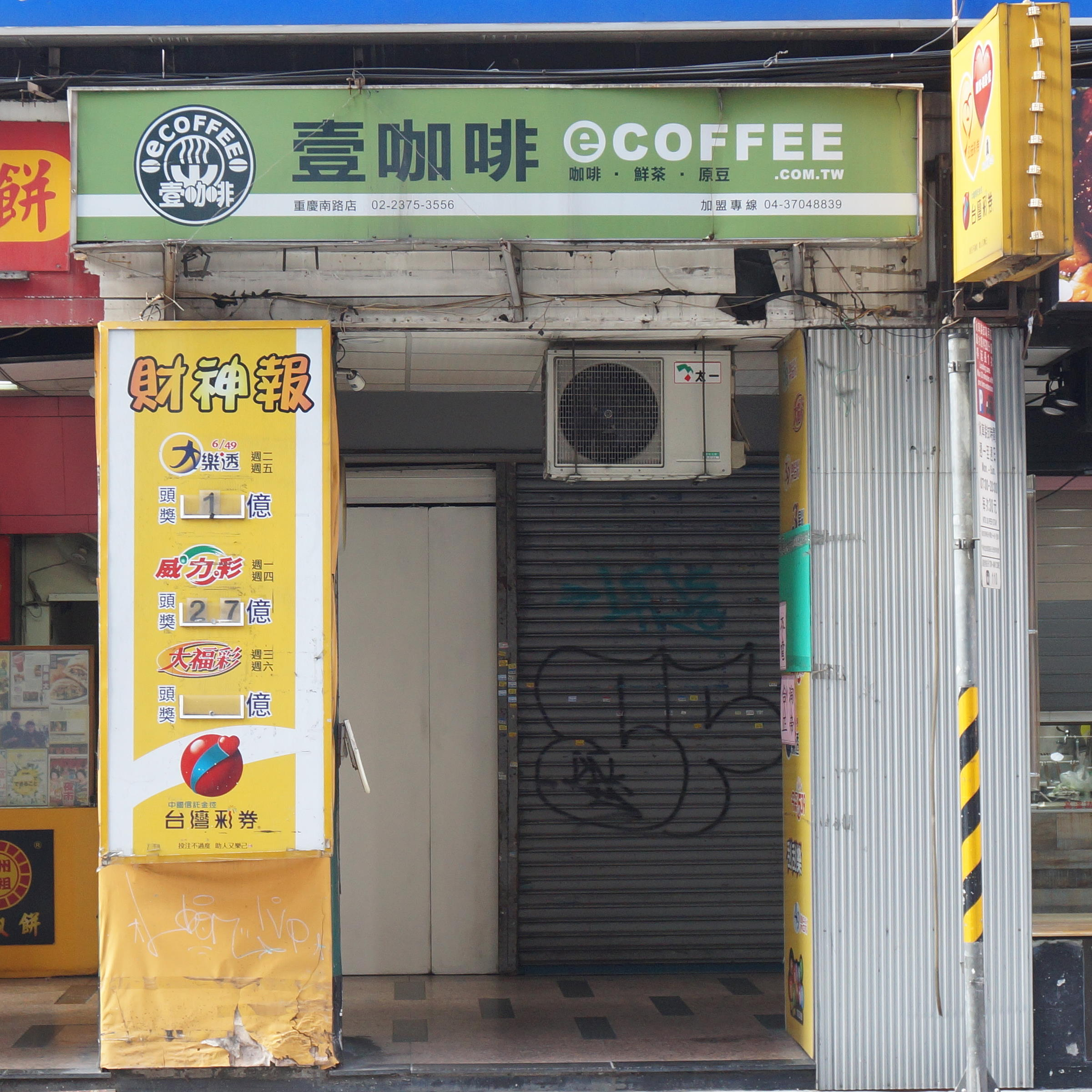
- Ecoffee Chongqing South Road Store
- Native name: 壹咖啡
- Industry: Coffee shop
- Founded: June 2002
- Founders: Yen Wen-shan
- Headquarters: Taipei, Taiwan
- Number of locations: 100+ (2025)
- Area served: Taiwan
- Products: Coffee beverages
- Website: www.ecoffee.com.tw

Ecoffee (Chinese: 壹咖啡) is a Taiwanese coffeehouse chain established in June 2002 in Taichung, Taiwan. It was founded by a husband-and-wife team. The brand's slogan is "Who says NT$35 can't buy good coffee?".

== See also ==
- List of coffeehouse chains
- List of companies of Taiwan
- Louisa Coffee
- Cafe!n
