= Maan Coffee =

Korean coffee chain

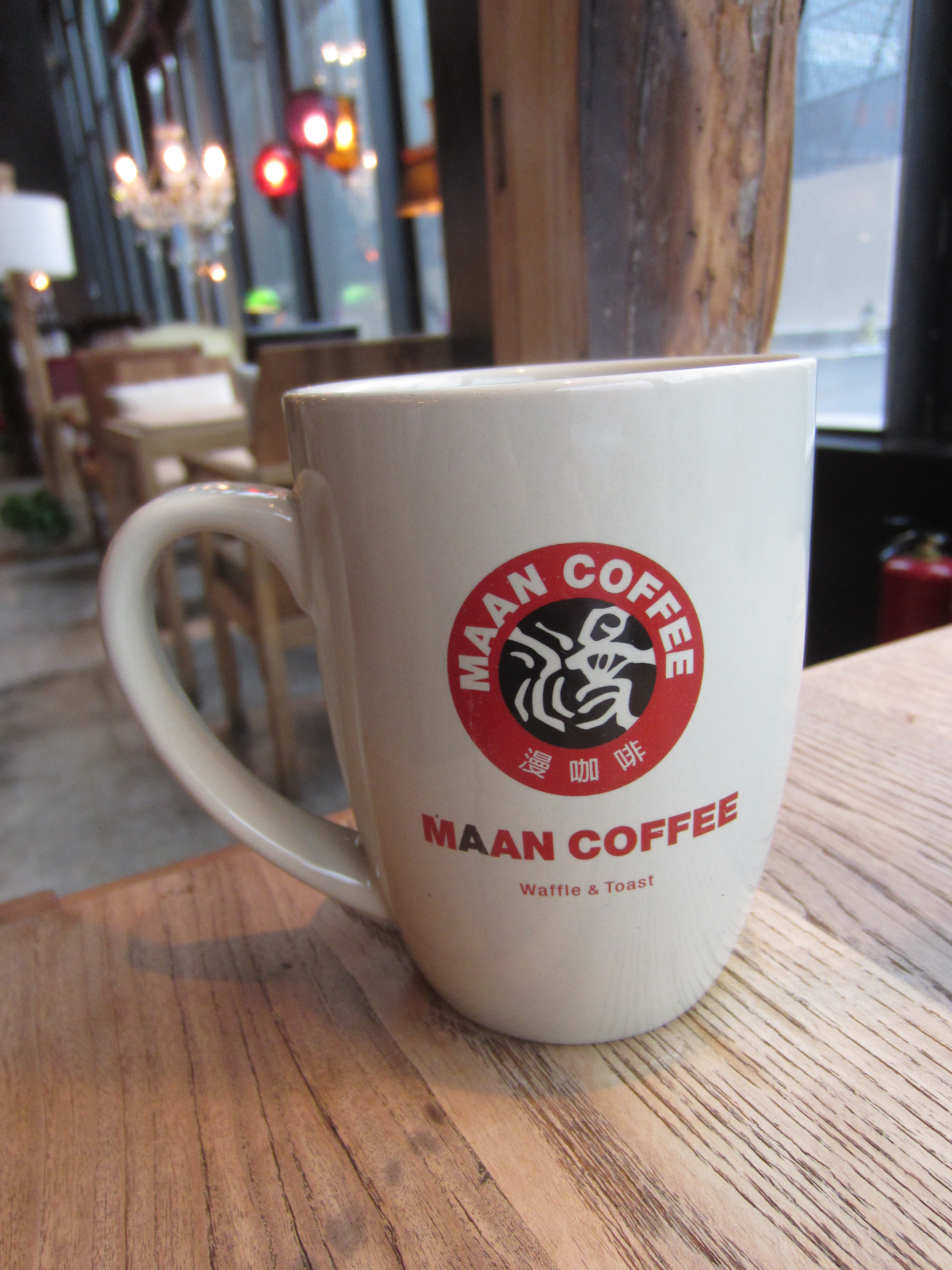
- Company type: Chain
- Industry: Coffee
- Website: Official website

Maan Coffee is a Chinese coffee chain. Their first store opened on 25 December 2010. By 2015, they have expanded to more than 150 stores.

== See also ==
- List of coffee companies
- List of coffeehouse chains
