= My Kopi-O! =

Indonesian coffee company

Coordinates: 7.294426°S 112.730427°E

- Type: Private
- Industry: Coffee shop and Bistro
- Founded: 16 August 2010; 16 years ago
- Founder: Darma Santoso
- Headquarters: Surabaya, Indonesia
- Number of locations: 31 (2019)
- Area served: Indonesia
- Products: Coffees, foods, and other beverages
- Subsidiaries: QUA-LI; My Kopi-O! Indonesian Bistro; Kulturhaus; Dendeng O!; Kampong Melayu; MauLo
- Website: mykopio.com

My Kopi-O! is an Indonesian coffee company and coffeehouse chain based in Surabaya, East Java. My Kopi-O! was founded by Darma Santoso on 16 August 2010 and the first coffeeshop outlet was opened in Townsquare Surabaya.

== Products ==
The coffee used by My Kopi-O! are Sapan Toraja variants of Arabica coffee, Pangalengan Arabica Malabar, Arabian Cloud and Flores Robusta Manggarai.

My Kopi-O! food consists of mainstream European cuisine, East Asian cuisine, Malaysian cuisine and Indonesian cuisine. My Kopi-O beverages include Kopitiam, European-style Coffee, desserts, smoothies, and others.

== Outlets ==
Numbers of My Kopi-O! outlets and its subsidiaries as 30 March 2019.

Number of My Kopi-O! outlets
Place	Numbers of outlets
Surabaya	8
Makassar	5
Yogyakarta	4
Palu	1
Malang	1
Bali	2
Lombok	3
Jakarta	1
Semarang	1
Palembang	1
Surakarta	1
Bandung	2
Serang	1
Total	31

== See also ==
- List of coffeehouse chains
