= PJ's Coffee =

American retail coffeehouse chain

- Type: Subsidiary
- Industry: Coffee shop
- Founded: 1978; 48 years ago
- Founder: Phyllis Jordan
- Headquarters: New Orleans, Louisiana, US
- Number of locations: 190 (2025)
- Key people: David Mesa, Jr., CFE (president); Felton Jones, III (Roastmaster)
- Products: Coffee beverages, teas, and food
- Parent: Raving Brands (2002 - 2008); New Orleans Brew (2008 - present)
- Website: PJ's Coffee

PJ's Coffee of New Orleans is an American chain of retail coffeehouses. PJ's was founded with a single shop in the Carrollton neighborhood of New Orleans in September 1978 by Phyllis Jordan (thus the initials "PJ"). It was formerly billed as "PJ's Coffee & Tea Co.". PJ's spread throughout the Greater New Orleans Area with company-owned outlets. Its first franchise, in Mandeville, Louisiana, in 1989, was successively followed by franchises in Hammond, Louisiana, and Picayune, Mississippi. PJ's then expanded across the Southeast and to other parts of the United States including California.

Jordan sold the company in 2002 to Raving Brands, an Atlanta-based firm. However, in 2008, ownership of PJ's returned to New Orleans when it was acquired from Raving Brands by New Orleans Brew, LLC. In its aggressive courting of potential franchisees, the closely held company offers a training program for potential and current restaurateurs. PJ's brand of coffee is also available in selected supermarkets.

PJ's has been cited for its customer loyalty and mentioned as a challenger to Starbucks, with which PJ's has a comparable menu. In 2004 PJ's announced an ambition to compete head-to-head with Starbucks on a national basis.

In 2009, PJ's was named the "preferred coffee" of the New Orleans Saints.

PJ's announced on July 14, 2020, a minimum of 11 franchise deals that have or would result in 15 different franchise locations. Nine of the 11 latest franchise deals are coming from franchisees in the brand's regions. Those areas include Addison, Dallas, McKinney, Monahans and Palmview, Texas; Platte City, Missouri; Columbus, Georgia; Orlando and Pensacola, Florida; and Columbia, South Carolina.

== See also ==
- List of coffeehouse chains
