= Cama Café =

Taiwanese coffeehouse chain

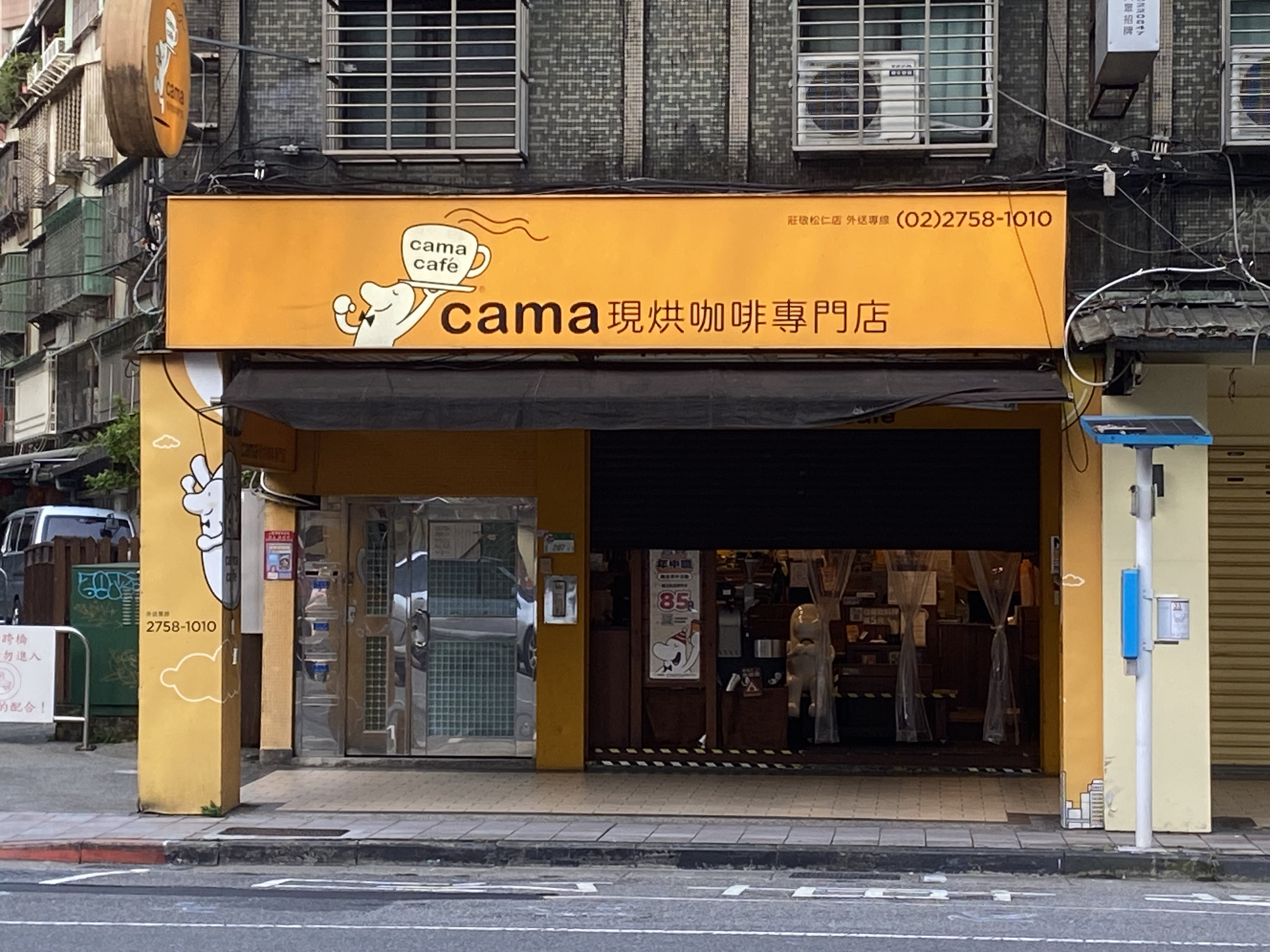
- Cama Café Zhuangjing Songren Store
- Native name: 咖碼
- Company type: Public
- Traded as: TPEx: 2759
- Industry: Coffee shop
- Founded: 2006
- Founders: Ho Ping-lin (何炳霖)
- Headquarters: Taipei, Taiwan
- Number of locations: 160 (2019)
- Area served: Taiwan
- Products: Coffee beverages
- Revenue: NTD$700m (2019)
- Website: www.camacafe.com

Cama Café (Chinese: 咖碼) is a Taiwanese coffeehouse chain.

== History ==
Cama Café was founded by Ho Ping-lin (Chinese: 何炳霖) in 2006. In 2019, it was reported that the chain was looking to expand into Southeast Asia.

== See also ==
- List of coffeehouse chains
- List of companies of Taiwan
