= Cafe Barbera =

Italian coffeehouse and fast casual dining franchise

Café Barbera
- Company type: Privately held
- Industry: Coffee house and fast casual restaurant
- Founded: 1870; 156 years ago, franchise founded in 2004; 22 years ago
- Founders: Domenico Barbera (1870), Enrico Barbera (franchise founder)
- Headquarters: Naples, Italy
- Key people: Enrico Barbera (CEO), Elio Barbera (MD)
- Products: Coffee, panini (sandwich), pizza, pasta, salads, appetizers, pastries
- Website: www.cafebarbera.com

Café Barbera is an Italian coffeehouse and fast casual dining franchise registered with the International Franchise Association (IFA) since 2015. It operates franchises in Europe, the UK, the Middle East, Africa, Asia and South America. The first Cafè Barbera opened in 2004 in Dubai and is named after the first Café Barbera founded by Domenico Barbera in 1870 in Southern Italy. It is considered one of the oldest companies in Europe and is still managed by the Barbera family.

== Business concept ==
Domenico Barbera established his coffee roasting business, named Caffé Barbera, in 1870 in Southern Italy. Being one of the five oldest coffee companies in Europe, the franchise company Café Barbera opened its first corporate coffeehouse in Dubai in 2004. The first franchisee location opened in Dubai in 2009.

== Franchise operations ==
Café Barbera became a member of the International Franchise Association in 2015. It has locations in Europe, South America, UAE, UK, Greece, Egypt, Ghana, Iraq, Kuwait, Qatar, Saudi Arabia, Romania, Morocco, Jordan, Georgia, Indonesia, Mauritius, Djibouti & Philippines. The company opened its first UAE coffee house location in Dubai in 2004 and had ten stores by 2020. In 2013, the first Brazilian franchised Café Barbera opened. There were multiple locations in Brazil by the end of 2015. The company also opened its first coffee shops in Africa in 2013. Several Café Barbera opened in 2014 in the Middle east and by the end of 2025 there were around 30 coffee houses in the region. Café Barbera entered also Pakistan in 2018 with four locations in the country. Between 2016 and 2019 stores were opened in Middle East, UK and Somaliland, Jordan, UAE and the United Kingdom. In 2019, Forbes Middle East featured the Cafe Barbera concept in the March issue as one of the fastest growing Italian coffee brand in the Middle East. Café Barbera has extensive growth plans in 2020 onward, with new stores opening in the UK, Romania, Greece, Georgia, Saudi Arabia, UAE, Egypt, Qatar, Mauritius, Maldives,Kenya Palestine, Djibouti, Indonesia, Malaysia and the Philippines.

== See also ==
- List of coffeehouse chains
