= Ediya Coffee =

South Korean coffeehouse chain

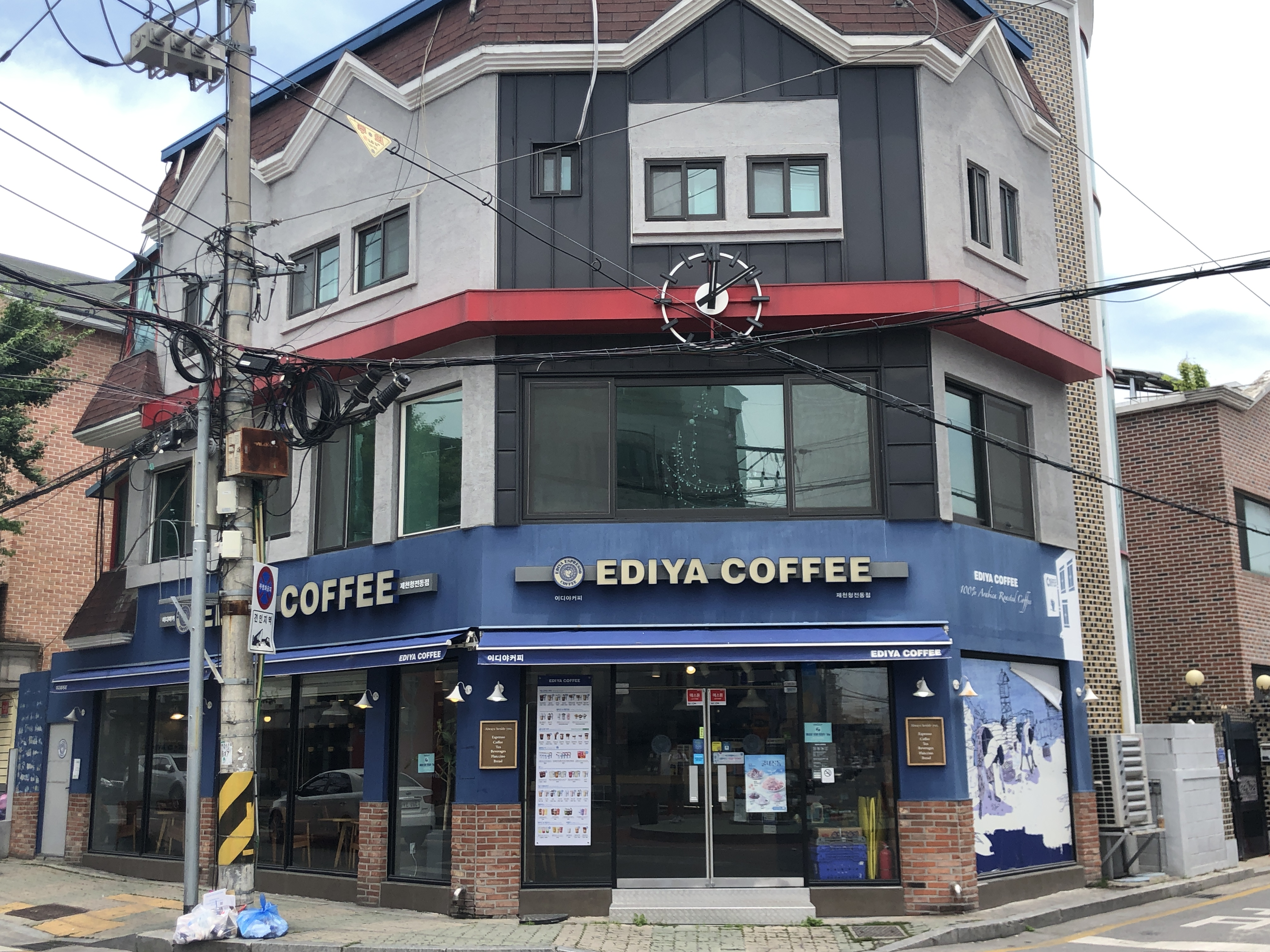
- Ediya Coffee branch in Jecheon, South Korea
- Industry: Coffee shop
- Founded: South Korea (2001)
- Headquarters: 636, Nonhyeon-ro, Gangnam-gu, Seoul, South Korea
- Number of locations: 4,000 (2024)
- Website: ediya.com

Ediya Coffee (Korean: 이디야 커피) is a South Korean coffeehouse chain. As of 2024, it had over 4,000 stores.

== History ==
Ediya launched its first store in 2001. In September 2005, it opened a branch in Beijing, China, but closed it in 2008 due to a lack of success. In November 2019, it inaugurated its 3,000th store, in Seo District, Daejeon. In 2018, Ediya Coffee launched a delivery service through Yogiyo. As of 2026, Ediya Coffee operates a store in Guam, part of its international expansion that also includes Malaysia, with further stores planned in Canada and Laos.

== See also ==
- List of coffeehouse chains
