= Raees Coffee =

Iranian coffeehouse chain

Raees Coffee is an Iranian coffeehouse chain based in Tehran. The company was founded in 2000, and currently has ten branches, and a roastery in Iran.

== See also ==
- List of coffeehouse chains
