= Coffee Like =

Russian coffee bar chain

- Founded: November 13, 2013; 12 years ago in Izhevsk, Russia
- Founder: Ayaz Shabutdinov, Zufar Garipov
- Key people: Alexey Gusakov (CEO)
- Products: coffee to go
- Website: https://coffee-like.com/

Coffee Like is the largest chain of coffee bars in "coffee to go" segment in Russia. It is one of the first projects of the Like companies group of Ayaz Shabutdinov.

== History ==
The company was founded in 2013 by Ayaz Shabutdinov and Zufar Garipov. The first coffee bar was opened on November 13, 2013, in Izhevsk on Universitetskaya Street (later it was given the status of a museum). According to Shabutdinov, it cost about 100 thousand rubles, and the equipment was provided free of charge by the coffee supplier. In November 2017, its revenue amounted to 367,820 rubles.

Right after the first coffee bar was opened, the company began selling franchises. The first partner-franchisee appeared on December 1, 2013, in the city of Yekaterinburg. By the end of 2013, there were already 9 Coffee Like coffee bars, and the company Coffee Like Logistics was established to provide partners with the necessary consumables (cups, straws, etc.). The first partners of Coffee Like were, basically, subscribers of the blog in VK.com, which Shabutdinov started in January 2013. They were young people from 19 to 25 old without experience in business management. Due to this lack of experience and knowledge, not all partners were able to keep their franchises open. 164 coffee bars were opened during the first year of operation; 44 of them were forced to close. According to the CEO of the company Alexey Gusakov: out of two thousand applications, ten are selected, after which the future partners are taught in Coffee Like academy using ERP-system and a "Knowledge Base". The last one was created by the company and includes various cases, coffee-bar technologies and partners' life hacks. According to RBС, by 2016 the cost of the Coffee Like franchise grew to 300 thousand rubles, which began to work as an additional filter when selecting partners of the company.

In 2015, a quality control system was adopted by Coffee Like, and a program for checking coffee bars with the help of "secret buyers" was launched.

In March 2017, the first full scale Coffee Like coffee house was opened with seats in Izhevsk on Krasnoheroyskaya Street.

In July 2017, Zufar Garipov left the board of the Coffee Like's founders. Shabutdinov became the main owner of Coffee Like. His share of capital exceeded 50%. On August 27, 2018, Shabutdinov sold Coffee Like company for 200 million rubles. The buyer is still unknown.

== Performance indicators ==
The revenue of the management company is divided into three parts: the operation of its own chain of coffee bars (ten places in Izhevsk), the sale of franchises and royalties and the supply of coffee beans and consumables to the partners' coffee bars.

According to "SPARK-Interfax", in 2015 the revenue of "Coffee Like" LLC amounted to 11.2 million rubles, net profit — 5.4 million rubles, the revenue of "Logistics Coffee" LLC — 34.6 million rubles, net loss — 678 thousand rubles. At the same time, the aggregate revenue of the group of companies amounted to 346 million rubles. According to RBC, in 2016 the average revenue of one Coffee Like bar, was 250 thousand rubles per month, and the revenue of the entire chain exceeded 50 million rubles per month.

By 2016, the number of Coffee Like coffee bars in the territory of Russia and the CIS countries had reached 238. 100 bars had been closed since the company was founded. According to the founders, some of the closed coffee bars were reopened in new locations. In the interview with RBС, Alexey Gusakov, Coffee Like CEO, noted that by the end of 2018 it was planned to increase the network to 400 coffee bars (at the beginning of the year, over 300 bars were opened) and enter the international market.

In 2017, the revenue of the Coffee Like chain was 800 million rubles. The number of operating coffee bars reached 297 in 73 cities of Russia and the CIS countries, the average revenue of one coffee bar is 280 thousand rubles per month, the average check is 160 rubles.

By October 2018, the revenue of the Coffee Like chain amounted to 987 million rubles. The number of operating coffee bars reached 431 in 105 cities of Russia and the CIS countries, the average revenue of one coffee bar is 287 thousand rubles per month, the average check is 167 rubles.

By July 2021, Coffee Like indicates in their website they have 825 coffee bars in Russia.

== Competitors in the market ==
According to RBC: in the middle of 2016, Coffee Like was the leader in Russia in terms of the number of coffee bars (238), followed by Bodryi Den (143), Coffee Way (126), Red Cup (55), Coffee and the city (44) and Take & Wake (22).

By early 2018, the company's position in the market of "coffee to go" has been preserved.

According to Forbes, in October 2023 the quantity of Coffee bars opened by Coffee Like reached 1021, 1014 of which are opened by franchisees.

== See also ==
- List of coffeehouse chains
