= Angel-in-us =

South Korean coffeehouse chain

ANGELINUS

- Angel-in-us Coffee Café & Dining in Songpa District, Seoul
- Industry: Coffee shop
- Founded: South Korea (2006; 20 years ago)
- Headquarters: Seoul, South Korea
- Number of locations: 600+ stores (2012)
- Area served: Asia
- Website: Official website

ANGELINUS, formerly known as Angel-in-us Coffee, is a coffeehouse chain based in South Korea and owned by the Lotte group.

== Expansion ==
ANGELINUS coffee, which is operated by Lotte, is steadily expanding its market share in Asia. It expanded to China in 2008 and to Indonesia in November 2011, and currently runs nine shops in China, four in Vietnam, three in Indonesia, and two in Kazakhstan.

As of 2017, the chain has over 800 retail stores in South Korea.

In 2018, Angel-in-us released a specialty menu for the spring season, offering beverages made from chocolate blossom.

== See also ==
- List of coffeehouse chains
