= Kaffebrenneriet =

Norwegian coffee shop chain

Kaffebrenneriet AS is a chain of coffeeshops in Norway.

Established in 1994, the company modeled its coffeeshops after those found on the West Coast of the United States. In 1999, Kaffebrenneriet grew further with NorgesGruppen buying a third of the company’s shares and, the following year Kaffebrenneriet started its own bakery “lab”.

It has 44 retail locations, with 36 coffeeshops in Oslo, 6 in Viken and 2 in Trøndelag.

Kaffebrenneriet employs more than 200 full and part-time workers.

== See also ==
- List of coffeehouse chains
