= O' Coffee Club =

Singaporean café chain

- Company type: Private company
- Industry: Food and Beverage
- Founded: 1991
- Headquarters: Singapore
- Area served: Singapore; Malaysia; Indonesia
- Products: Coffee beverages; tea; baked goods; western cuisine
- Website: www.ocoffeeclub.com

O' Coffee Club (commonly known as Coffee Club) is a Singaporean coffee house and restaurant chain. The chain was founded in Holland Village in 1991 as a 2-storey establishment and has since expanded to 23 outlets in Singapore, 6 in Malaysia and 4 in Indonesia.

O' Coffee Club serves hot and cold drinks, including coffees, teas, iced teas, juices, smoothies and milkshakes. The chain also offers full-course meals at its outlets, as well as desserts and other baked goods.

== History ==
The first O' Coffee Club outlet opened in Holland Village, Singapore in 1991. During its founding, it was Singapore's first gourmet coffee house and the company had their own roasting facilities located in the first outlet. The chain has expanded locally and regionally since then and currently has outlets in Malaysia and Indonesia. Central production facilities were established since its expansion to ensure product quality.
