= Komeda Coffee =

Japanese coffee shop brand

Komeda Holdings
- Native name: 株式会社コメダ
- Romanized name: Komeda Holdings
- Type: Public company
- Traded as: TYO: 3543
- Industry: Restaurants; Retail coffee and tea Retail beverages
- Founded: 1971; 55 years ago
- Founder: Taro Kato (加藤太郎)
- Headquarters: Nagoya, Japan
- Area served: mainly Japan and Taiwan
- Key people: Yuichi Amari, Hiroki Shimizu
- Products: Whole bean coffee Made-to-order beverages
- Services: Coffee
- Website: www.komeda-holdings.co.jp

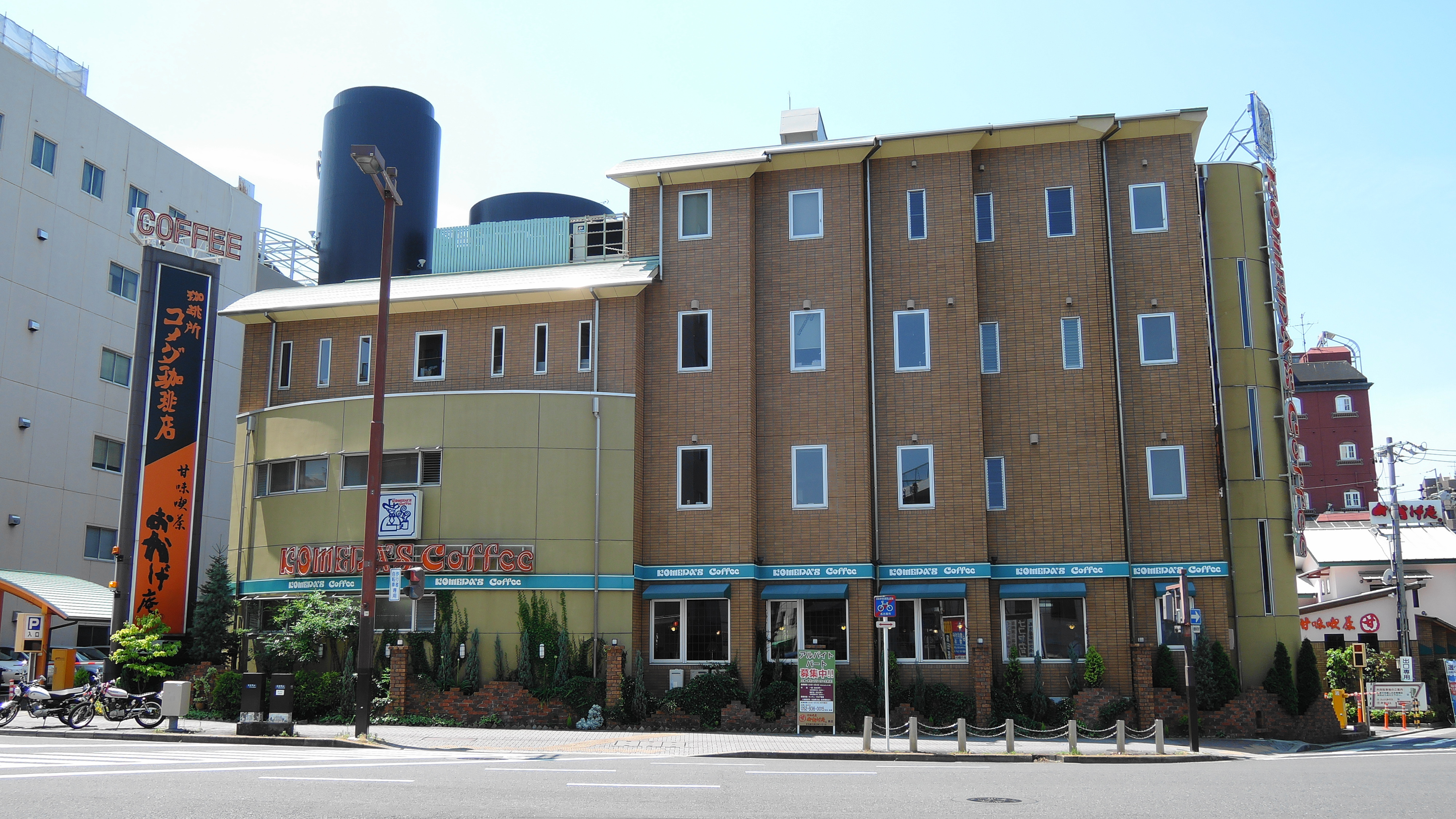

Komeda Holdings (株式会社コメダ), doing business as Komeda Coffee, is a Japanese multinational coffeehouse chain. It operates 940 coffee shops, 12 restaurants, and 3 bakeries in Japan, and has over 30 branches internationally in Taiwan, Hong Kong, Indonesia and Shanghai.

According to Japan Eater, Komeda Coffee is known for its homy ambiance and spacious seating. Its "morning service" is considered especially popular. In 2021, Komeda won first place in the "café" category in a customer satisfaction survey conducted by the Japan Productivity Center's Service Industry Productivity Council.

Komeda Holdings is a publicly listed Japanese corporation. In 2022, it annual sales volume exceeded 1.13 billion yen.

== History ==
In January 1968 Taro Kato opened the first Komeda Coffee shop in Nagoya. The name "Komeda" was derived from his family business, a rice shop; the word kome in Japanese means "rice". In 1970 this business expanded as a franchise and in 1993 a training program for chain managers was developed.

After a change in financial structure in 2014, Komeda was listed on the first section of the Tokyo Stock Exchange in 2016. By May 2021, it had expanded to 911 coffee shops and 11 sweets shops. Komeda opened a bakery-type store in Haebaru, Okinawa, and an overseas store in Shanghai in 2016.

== Product ==
Komeda is a full-service coffee shop where customers can relax with a variety of beverages in a homy atmosphere. One of their signature menu items is their shiro noir, which resembles a pancake with soft vanilla ice cream on top. Breakfast services, inspired by Nagoya's "morning service" culture, operate open until 11:00 a.m. and include toast with a boiled egg along with a drink order. Ogura toast also features on the menu. During the rest of the day, a range of drinks are offered with additional sweets such as bean pastries, and light meals such as curry and salads. Seasonal foods, such as kakigōri in the summer, are also available.

== See also ==
- List of coffeehouse chains
