= The Human Bean =

American coffee shop chain

- Type: Private
- Industry: Restaurants
- Founded: 1998
- Headquarters: Medford, Oregon, U.S.
- Number of locations: Over 180
- Key people: Daniel Hawkins, CEO, Scott M. Anderson, COO, Tom Casey, Co-Founder
- Products: Coffee; Tea and Herbal Teas; Specialty beverages Assorted food Smoothies; Merchandise

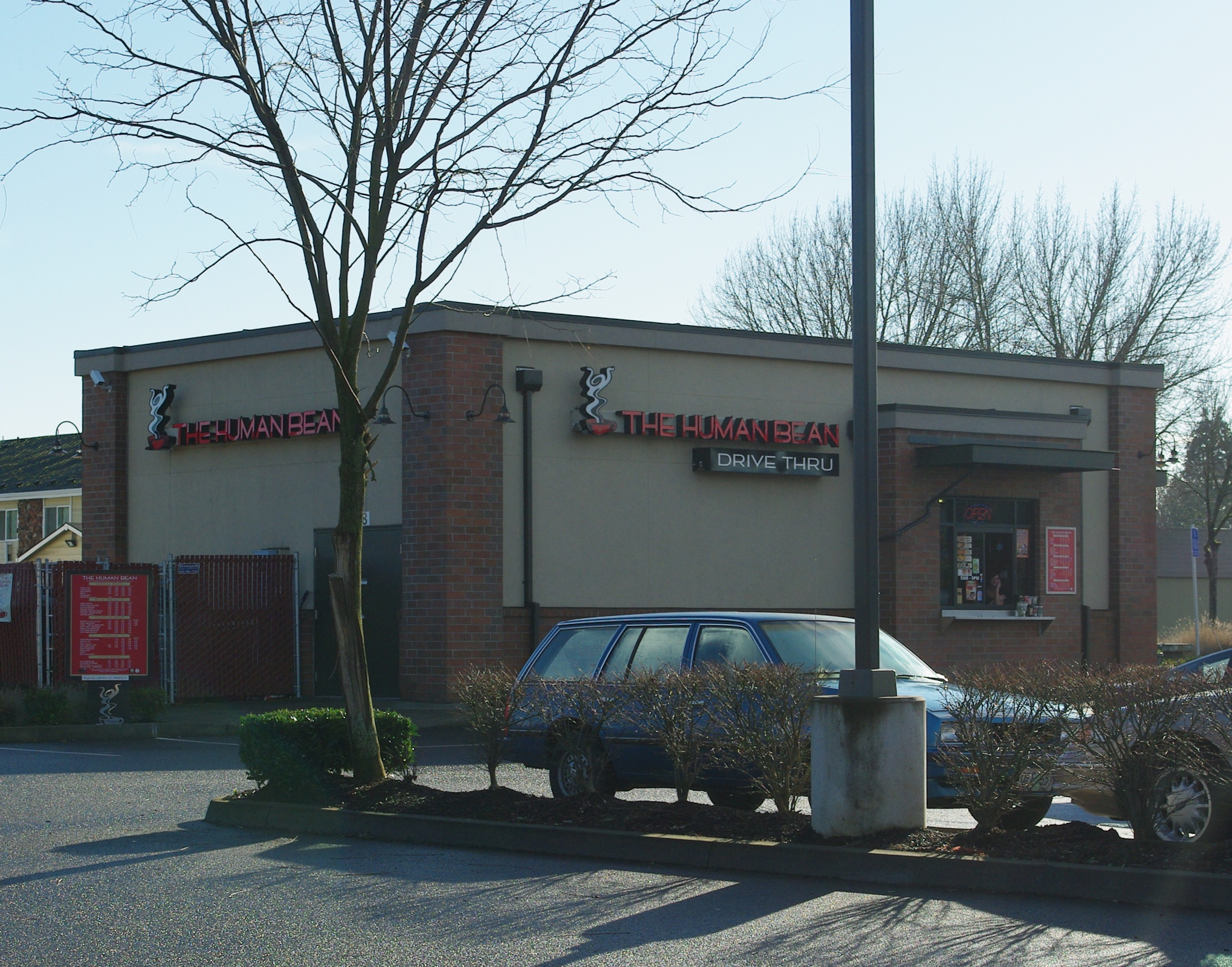
A location in Hillsboro, Oregon

The Human Bean is an American national coffee company and coffeehouse chain based in Medford, Oregon. The Human Bean has 180+ drive-thru coffee locations open or in development in 25 U.S. states. The drive thru espresso brand started franchising in 2002.

== History ==
In 1998, The Human Bean opened its first store in Ashland, Oregon.

A duo of husband and wife teams decided to open a stand-alone, drive-thru coffee shop.

In early-2002, the company began franchising their brand throughout southern Oregon and nationwide.

The Human Bean has 177 locations. The franchise is located in 25 U.S. states including Arizona, California, Colorado, Florida, Georgia, Idaho, Illinois, Indiana, Kentucky, Maryland, Missouri, Nevada, New Jersey, New Mexico, Ohio, Oregon, South Dakota, Tennessee, Texas, Virginia, Washington, Wyoming, and West Virginia.

While most locations are drive-thru only, there are a few locations that offer indoor seating in addition to the drive thru.

== Menu and Products ==
While coffee remains a core part of the business, The Human Bean also offers a range of beverages, including smoothies, Italian sodas, and tea.

In January 2024, they introduced their new Bright® Energy drink using caffeine extracted from green coffee beans, as well as B6 and B12 vitamins, Ginseng Root, and L-Carnitine.

== App ==
The Human Bean changed its punch cards to provide easier access for customer to earn rewards and be updated with the latest offers and news.

In November 2023, The Human Bean updated its mobile application and loyalty program in response to evolving consumer trends, with the aim of streamlining the process for customers to earn rewards such as complimentary drinks.

The updated app offers ordering, reward tracking, and balance reloading, enhancing the overall coffee experience. Their loyalty program now features tiered status levels—Silver, Gold, and Platinum—where customers earn beans (points) at varying rates, rewarding their most dedicated fans more quickly. Each tier unlocks exclusive offers and special access to menu items. The app also keeps users connected with personalized deals, location services, and the latest updates.

== Givebacks ==
Committed to making a difference, The Human Bean holds four annual giveback events: Earth Day, St. Jude, Food Drive, and Coffee for a Cure.

=== Earth Day ===
Every Earth Day, The Human Bean donates one tree for every drink purchased to Trees for the Future. All locations participate, making this a nationwide day of giving back to their global community. To date, they have planted 328,782 trees.

=== St. Jude ===
The Human Bean starts a new partnership with St. Jude Children's Research Hospital® in 2024. During this giveback, all locations will donate $1 for every drink purchased on a special day each August to St. Jude.

=== Food Drive ===
Each year The Human Bean chooses a Friday in June to give $1 for each drink sold to local food pantries and programs that work to end hunger. On average, it takes $1 to provide three meals for those in need. In 2024, The Human Bean was able to donate the equivalent of 202,998 meals to local food-focused organizations.

=== Coffee for a Cure ===
Once a year during Breast Cancer Awareness Month in October, all sales from The Human Bean locations all around the country donate 100% of food and drink sales on one special Friday to support patients with mammograms, post-diagnosis care and support, and breast cancer education.

== Awards and recognition ==
In January 2021, The Human Bean was named one of the Top 100 of Entrepreneur ’s Franchise 500.

In February 2021, Scott Anderson, COO of Nation's Restaurant News Most Influential Restaurant Executives in the Country.

In July 2021, The Human Bean was named one of Nation's Restaurant News Top 25 Fastest Growing Restaurant Chains in America by Nation's Restaurant News.

In September 2023, The Human Bean was ranked in the Franchise Times Top 400 List.
