= SPoT Coffee =

Coffeehouse chain

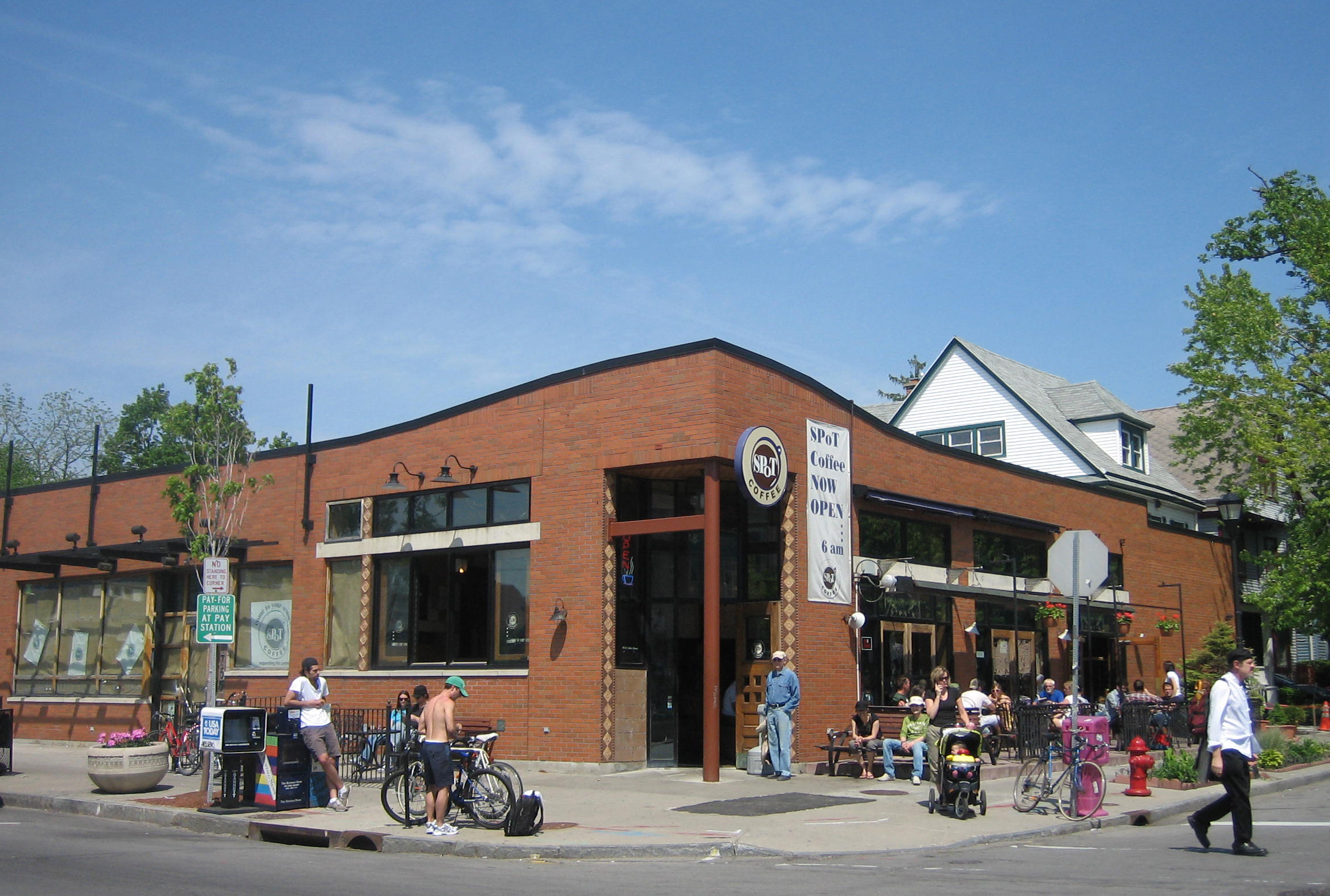
- SPoT Coffee on Elmwood Ave. in Buffalo
- Company type: Public (TSX-V: SPP)
- Industry: Coffeehouse; Restaurants
- Founded: 1 January 1996
- Headquarters: Buffalo, New York
- Area served: United States, Canada
- Products: Coffee, tea, soups, Pizzas, sandwiches, wraps
- Website: www.spotcoffee.com

SPoT Coffee & Spot Coffee (Canada) Ltd. (abbreviated SPP) is an international coffee company and coffeehouse chain which is headquartered in Buffalo, New York.

SPoT designs, builds and operates community- oriented cafés.

== Locations and expansions ==
SPoT Coffee first opened in Buffalo in 1996. As of 2019, SPoT operates 17 coffee houses and Express cafés. 13 are located in and around Buffalo, one in Rochester, one each in Saratoga Springs and Glens Falls, NY, as well as one in Connecticut. In 2009, SPoT opened their fifth location called Williamsville SPoT, in the town of Amherst, New York. In 2010, the company added a Delray Beach, Florida location which received a 2011 historic preservation board award. SPoT also has locations in Clarence, New York and Saratoga Springs, NY. SPoT opened an Express café inside Roswell Park Comprehensive Cancer Center in June 2018, and the company opened a location in Snyder, NY and in West Hartford, Connecticut later that year.

== Unionzation efforts ==
Three longtime employees who were fired by Spot Coffee said they were illegally terminated for their involvement in unionization efforts. Union meetings were held over poor working conditions and low pay. SPoT fired two workers for attending a union meeting and then also fired a manager after the manager refused to give up names of employees who attended the meeting.

On August 21, 2019, Spot Coffee employees voted, 43–6, to form a union, making them some of the only barista workers in the country with union representation. This vote will affect 90 workers at Spot Coffee locations in Buffalo at the Hertel, Delaware and Elmwood avenues, along with one on Main Street in Williamsville.

== Gallery ==
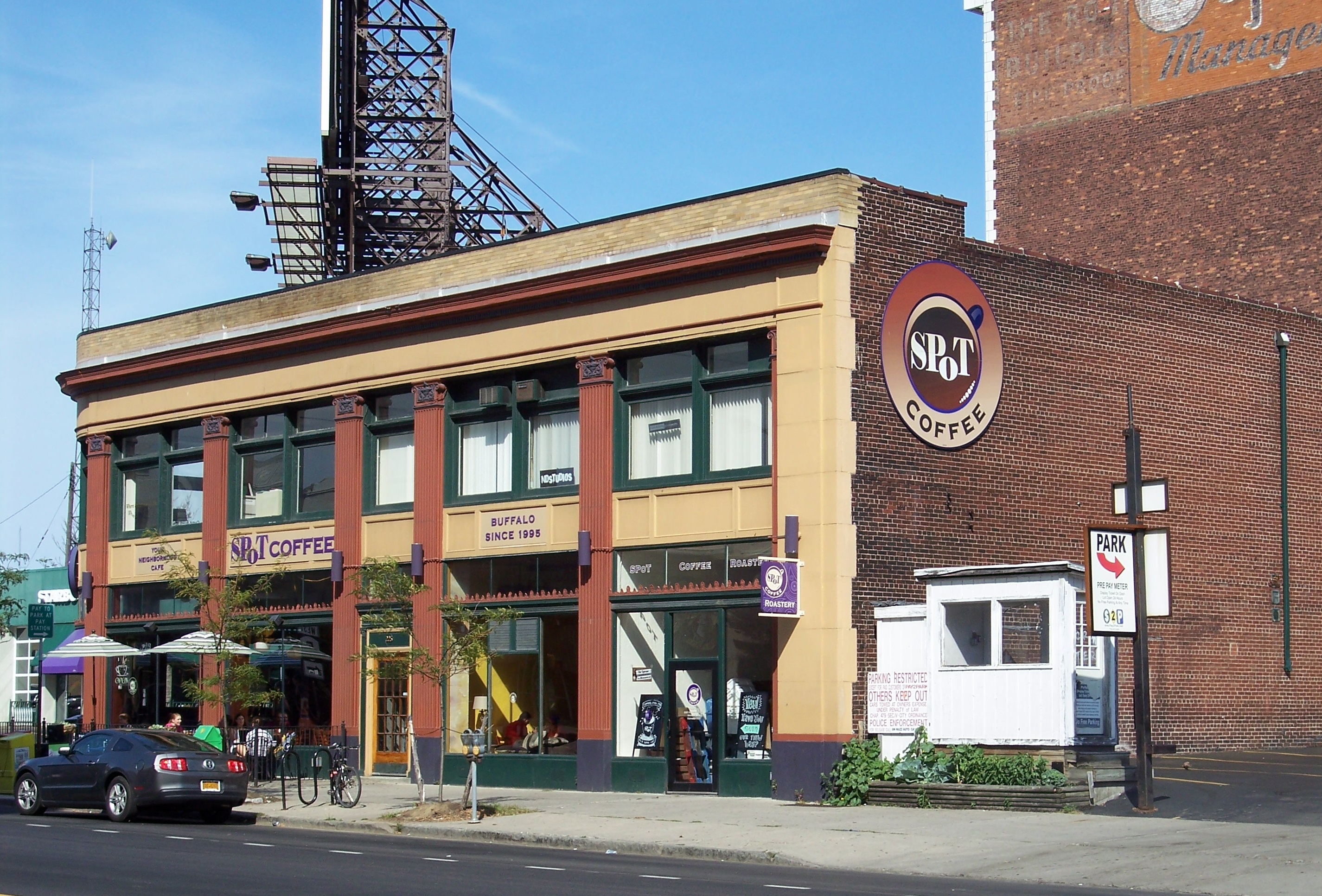
The first spot location in downtown Buffalo

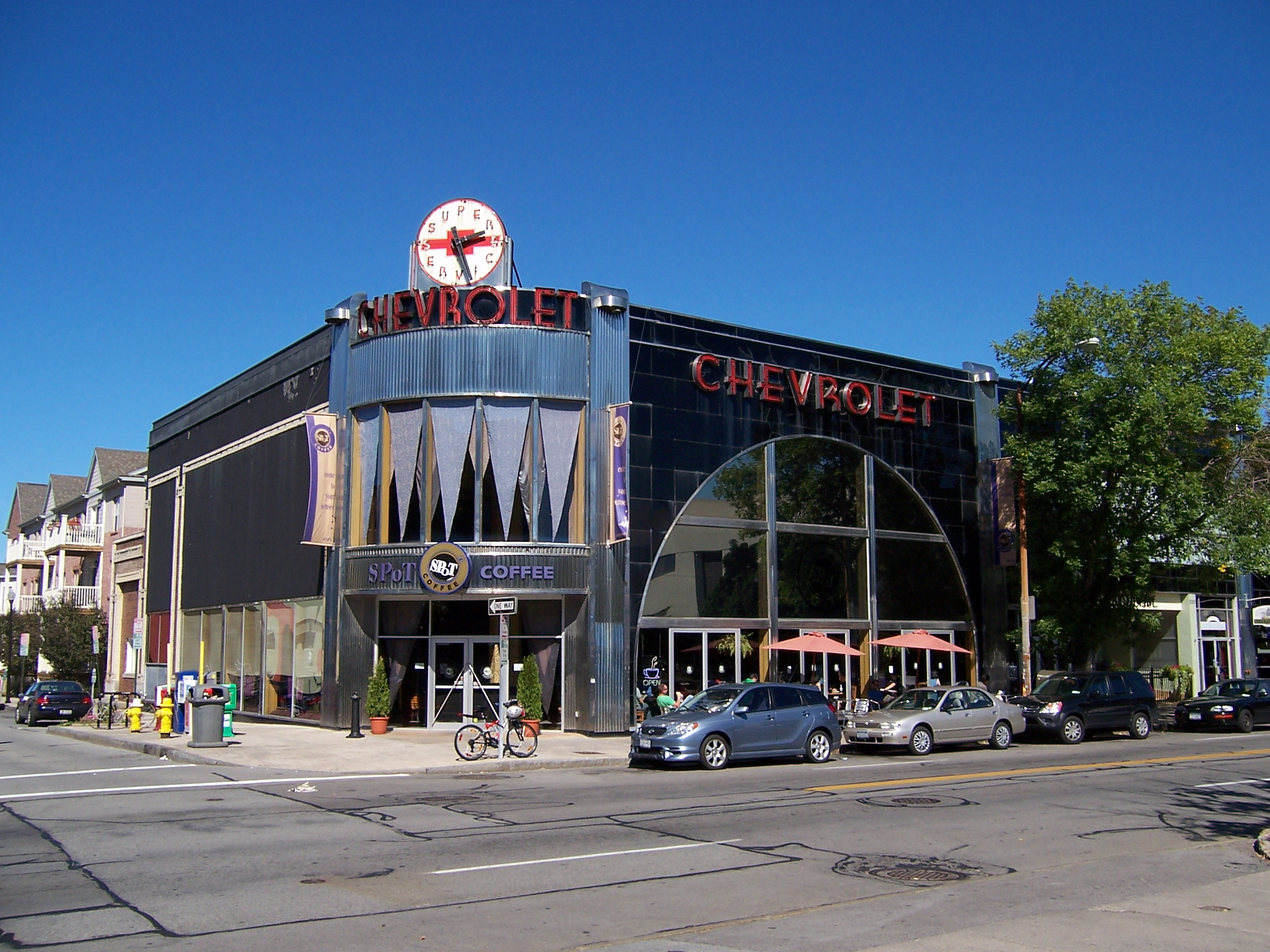
The Rochester location

== See also ==
- List of coffeehouse chains
