= Blenz Coffee =

Canadian coffee house chain

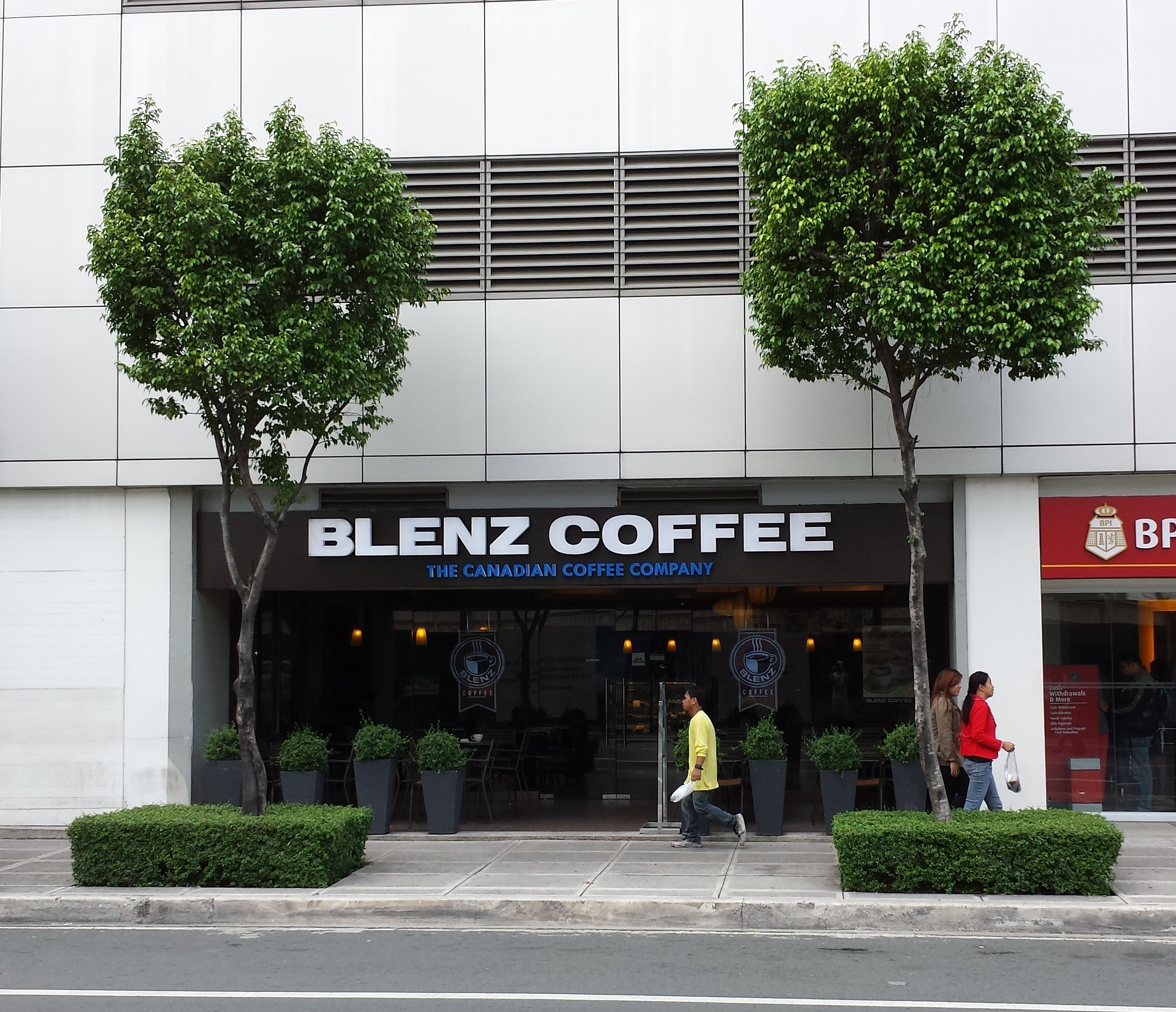
- Storefront at 31st Street in Bonifacio Global City, Metro Manila, Philippines.
- Company type: Private
- Industry: Coffee
- Founded: 1992; 34 years ago
- Headquarters: Vancouver, British Columbia, Canada
- Number of locations: 64 (2020)
- Area served: Worldwide
- Products: Whole Bean Coffee; Loose Leaf Tea; Matcha Tea Beverages; Speciality Desserts; Coffee, Tea Lattes; Mocha Beverages
- Website: blenz.com

Blenz Coffee (officially Blenz The Canadian Coffee Company) is a Canadian franchise chain of coffee shops. The first location opened in Vancouver in 1992. The chain currently has approximately 50 locations, most of which are in the Lower Mainland region of British Columbia. In 2024, the chain announced plans to open locations in the Greater Toronto Area in 2025.

== See also ==
- Coffee house
- List of coffeehouse chains
