= Cafe!n =

Taiwanese coffeehouse chain

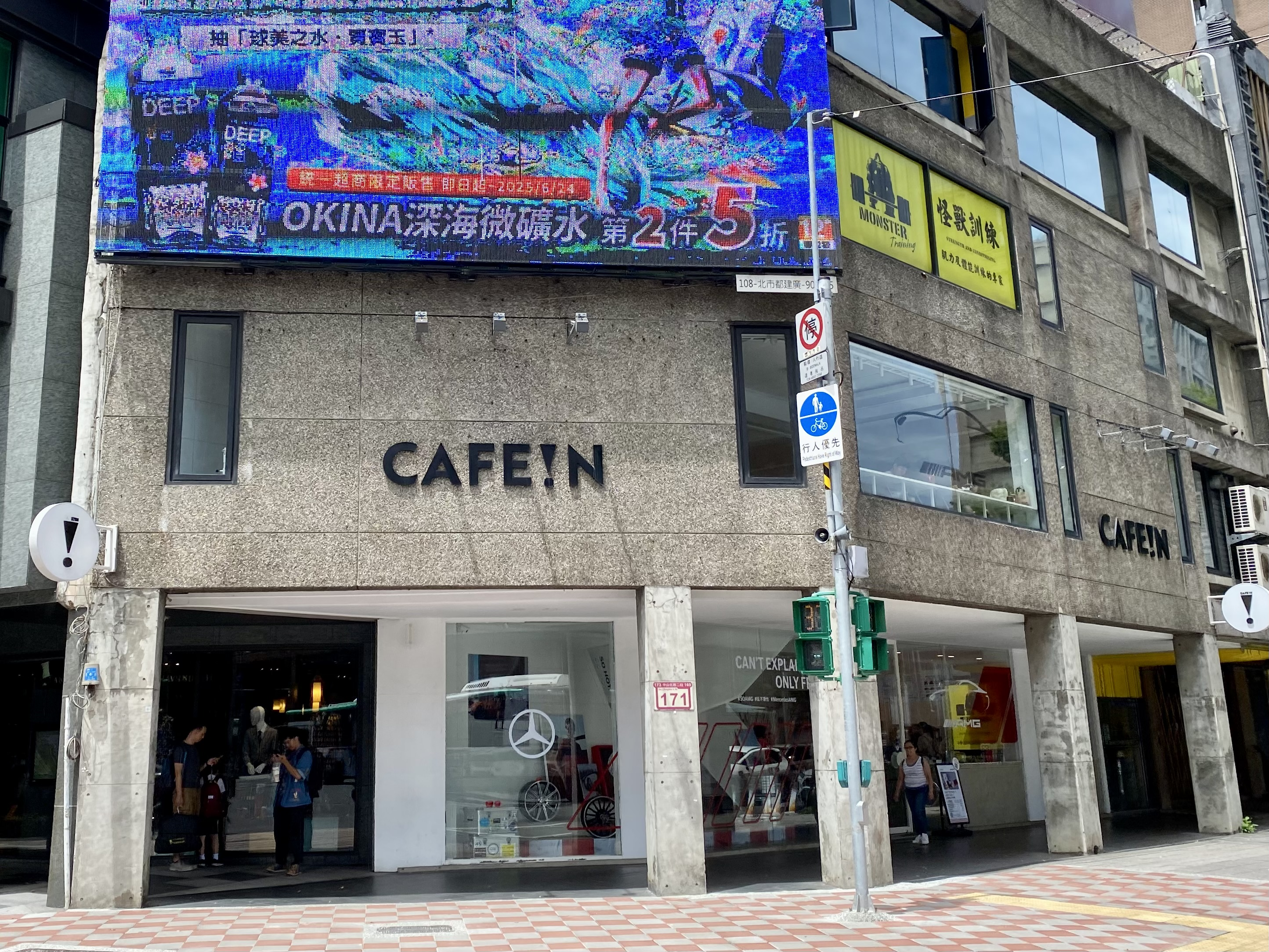
- CAFE!N Minquan Shop in Taipei
- Native name: 硬咖啡
- Industry: Coffee shop
- Founded: 2018
- Founders: Chris Huang
- Headquarters: Taipei, Taiwan
- Number of locations: 24 (2025)
- Area served: Taiwan
- Products: Coffee beverages
- Website: www.cafein.com.tw

Cafe!n, (Chinese: 硬咖啡) stylized in all capital letters, is a Taiwanese specialty coffeehouse chain. It was founded in 2018.

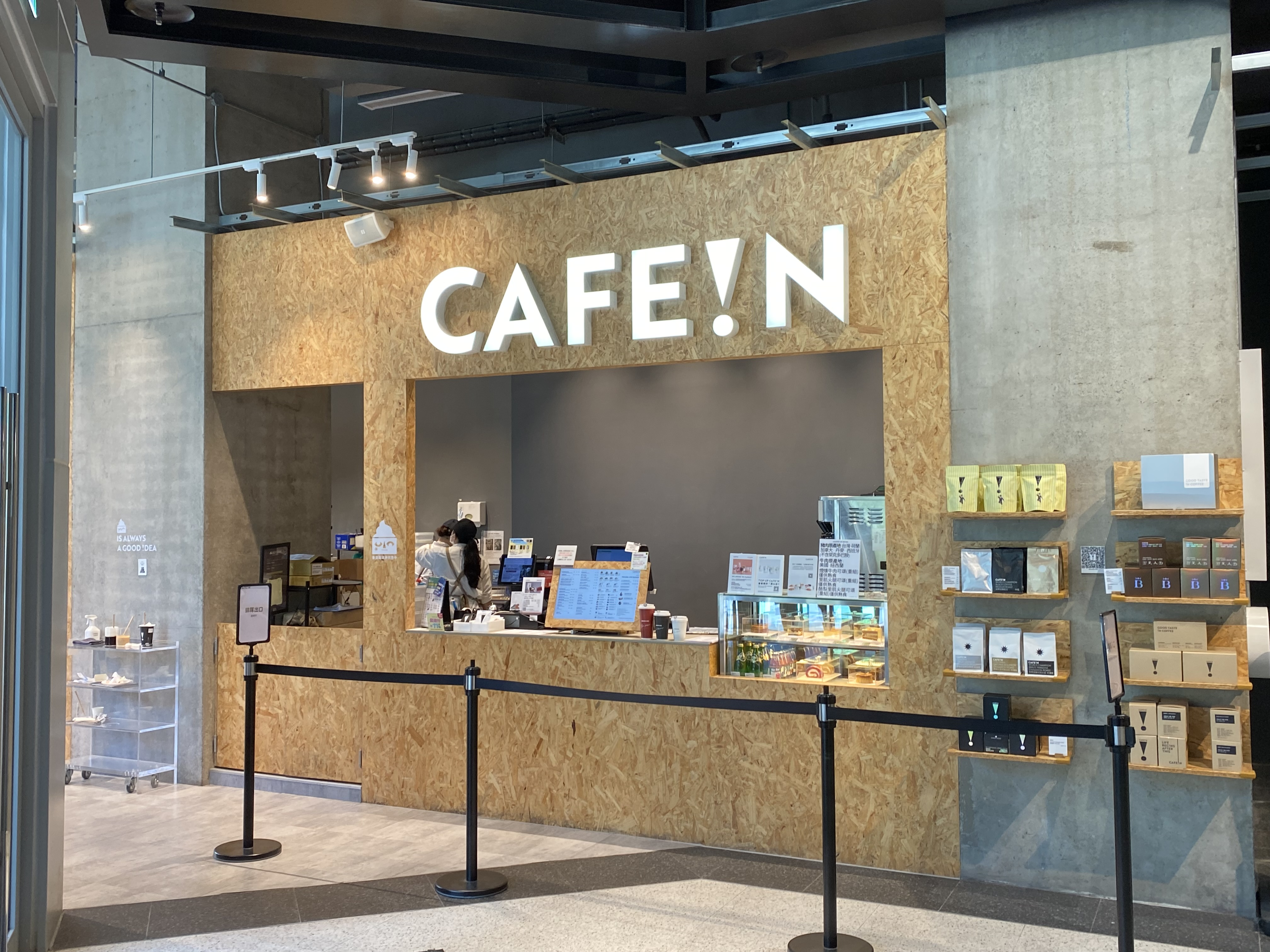
Yes!Life Mall location

== See also ==
- List of coffeehouse chains
- List of companies of Taiwan
- Louisa Coffee
