= Arcaffe =

Cafe chain in İsrael

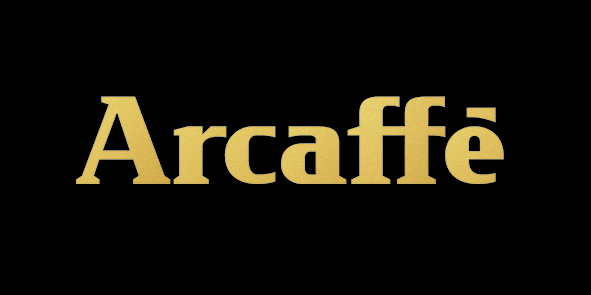
- Founded: 1995
- Number of locations: 57 (2022)
- Area served: Israel

Arcaffe (Hebrew: ארקפה) is a chain of cafes in Israel with 69 outlets across the country. The chain was established in 1995 with the aim of bringing Italian espresso bars to Israel. Arcaffe launched its international activity by signing a cooperation agreement with Galeries Lafayette, a French department store. Arcaffe now operates two branches in France. Arcaffe, which has upscale pretensions, chooses its locations carefully, preferring affluent neighborhoods and high-tech centers.

== See also ==
- List of coffeehouse chains
