= Barista Coffee (Taiwan) =

Taiwanese coffeehouse chain

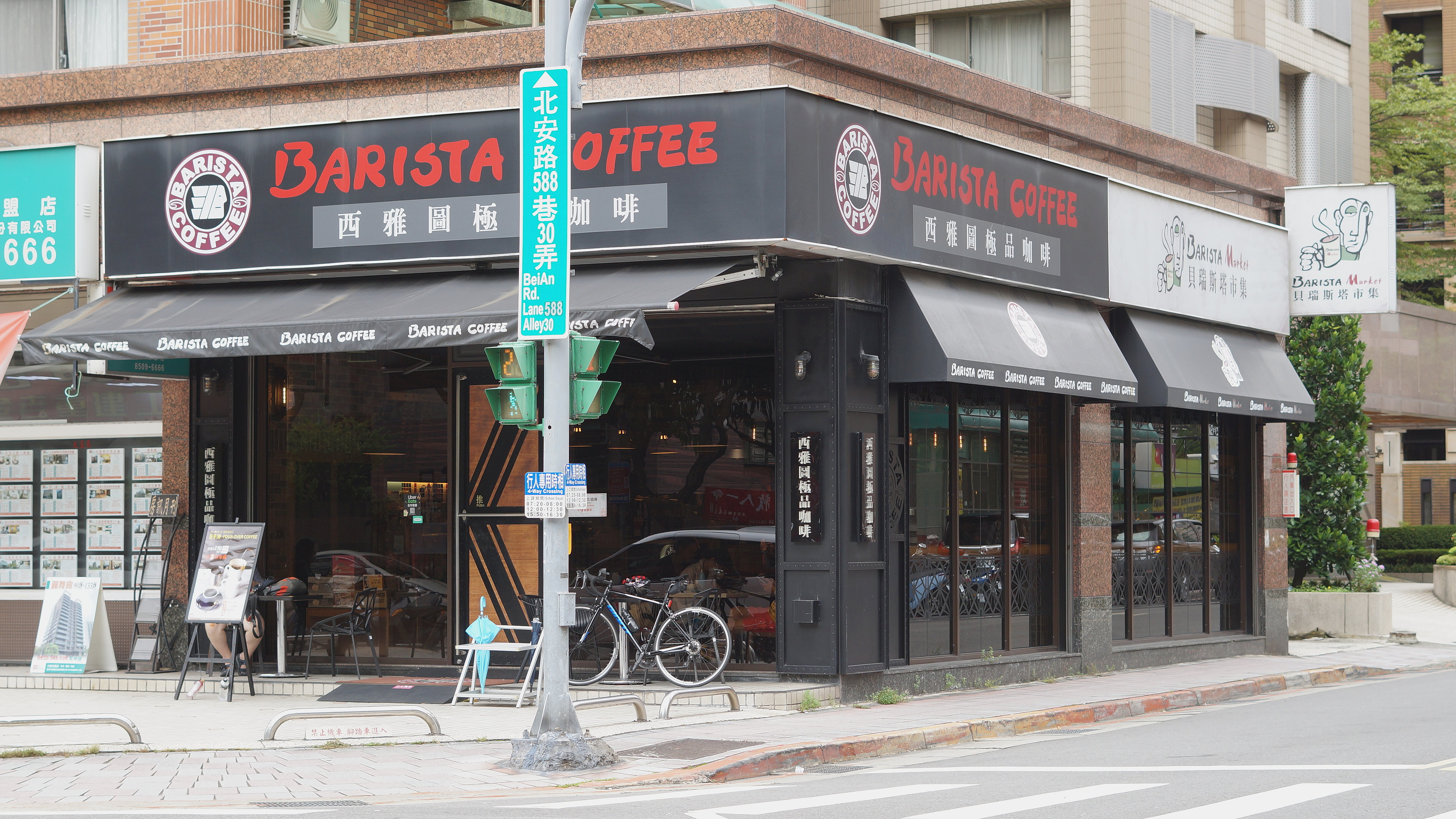
- Barista Coffee Dazhi Store
- Native name: 西雅圖極品咖啡
- Type: Joint-stock company
- Industry: Coffee shop
- Founded: March 1997
- Headquarters: Taipei, Taiwan
- Number of locations: 27 (2026)
- Area served: Taiwan
- Products: Coffee beverages
- Website: www.barista.com.tw

Barista Coffee (Chinese: 西雅圖極品咖啡) is a Taiwanese coffeehouse chain. Founded in March 1997, it is known for its dark-roast coffee. Originally focused on café operations, the company later expanded into coffee-bean roasting, instant and drip-coffee product development, and retail distribution. Its stores are mainly located in Taiwan, however, the brand also operates in Beijing.

== History ==
In 1997, Barista Coffee became Taiwan’s first coffeehouse chain devoted to dark-roast coffee. After initially importing roasted beans from overseas, the founders noticed that long-distance transport compromised freshness—prompting them to establish their own roasting facility.

In 1998, the Barista Coffee Roasting Company was founded, where skilled roasters crafted espresso beans to ensure consistent quality and freshness—one of the earliest self-operated roasteries among Taiwan’s coffee chains.

In 2002, the brand launched Barista 3-in-1 instant latte, which marked its entry into the instant-coffee market.

In 2003, the brand released its first drip-coffee line, promoting home-brewing culture across Taiwan.

In 2008, Barista Coffee expanded into the Chinese market and opened its first overseas café in Beijing.

In 2009, the brand Introduced hand-drip coffee preparation, providing customers with more refined brewing options.

In 2011, the brand began using estate-grade beans and German Probat roasters, and opened a second factory to enhance capacity and quality stability.

In 2014, the brand established Barista Premium (極品嚴焙), a specialty café brand positioned in the premium coffee segment.

In 2015, Barista Market, an online retail platform integrating e-commerce and physical channels, was launched.

In 2017, the brand introduced the Diamond Series Specialty Drip Coffee, bringing specialty beans into the home-brewing market.

In 2018, Barista Coffee released a bulletproof coffee line and bottled Barista coffee drinks, entering the ready-to-drink market.

In 2019, the brand debuted the Drip Brew Coffee series, highlighting the pure essence of coffee.

In 2020, the brand cooperated with Japanese partners to develop Espresso Shot Capsules, offering portable and versatile brewing solutions.

In 2021, Barista Coffee launched Cuppers’ Immersed Coffee, featuring a patented immersion bag design for a new extraction experience.

In 2022, Barista Coffee introduced the Herbal Series beverages, marking its expansion into the health and wellness category.

In 2023, the brand released the Geisha Blend Specialty Drip Coffee line, popularizing high-grade beans through affordable packaging.

In 2024, the brand has been actively expanding internationally, exporting products to the United States, mainland China, Russia, South Korea, Australia, the Middle East, and the Philippines.

== Products and operations ==
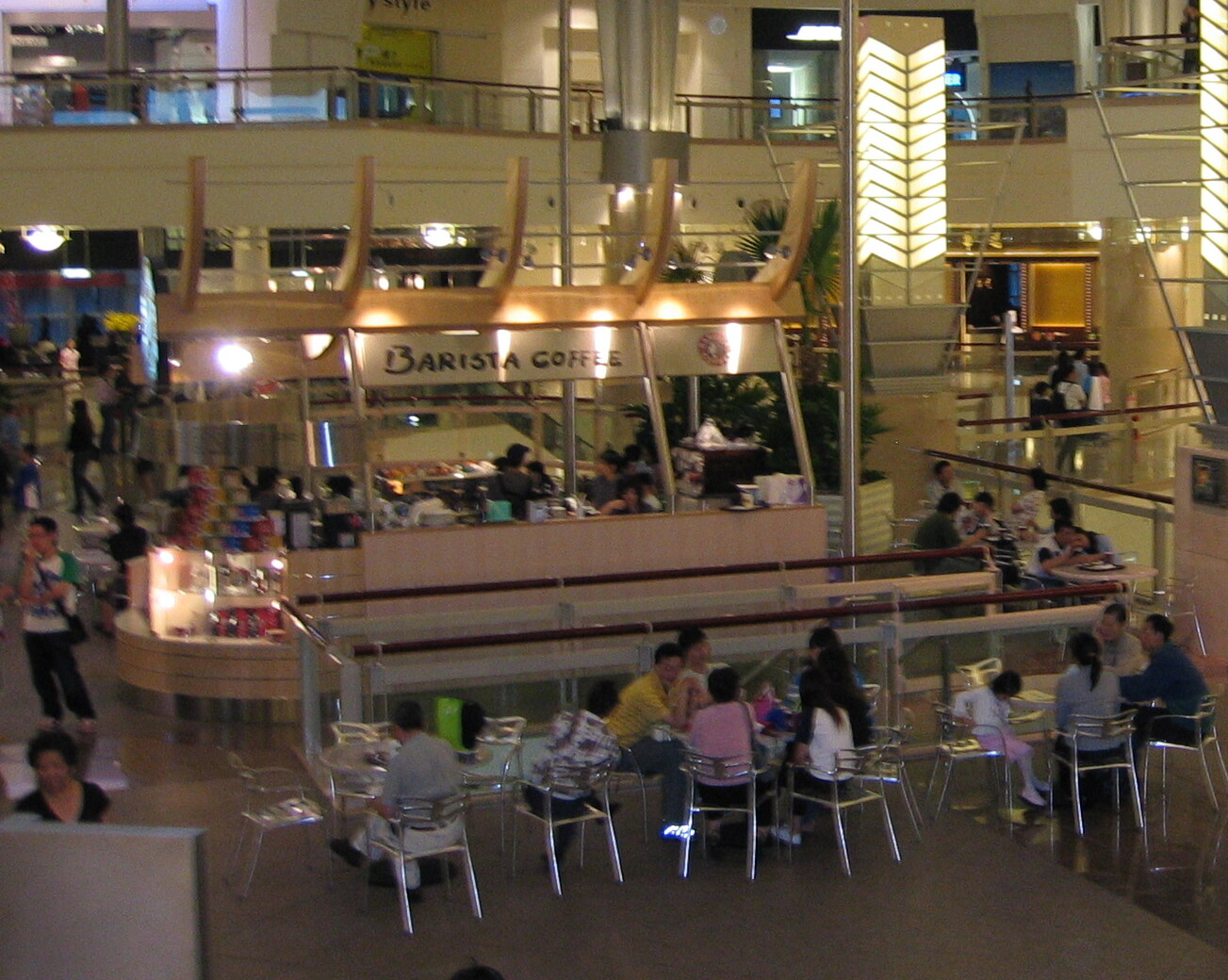
Taipei 101 kiosk

Barista Coffee’s main product is its signature dark-roasted beans, which is roasted at the Barista Coffee Roasting Company's factories. In addition, Barista Coffee also sells freshly brewed beverages, such as espresso, latte, or cappuccino; packaged products, such as drip coffee, instant coffee, or roasted beans; and seasonal drinks and coffee-inspired snacks, such as coffee egg rolls.

Barista Coffee distributes its coffee through its cafés, convenience stores, hypermarkets, and e-commerce platforms. It has expanded globally.

== Controversy ==
In 2019, Barista Coffee was accused of mixing low-priced coffee beans with high-priced Arabica coffee beans. Thirteen products were labelled as 100% Arabica. The Shilin District Court concluded the case, finding that the general manager, Liu Zengxiang, and factory manager, Li, had violated the "false labelling of products" provision under the Food Safety and Sanitation Act. Liu was sentenced to six months in prison and Li to four months, both with two years probation. Additionally, they were fined a total of NT$3.3 million and the illegal profits of NT$18.29 million were confiscated. He, the roasting team leader, was acquitted as he was not involved in the marketing strategy or labelling decisions.

== See also ==
- List of coffeehouse chains
- List of companies of Taiwan
