= Port City Java =

Coffeehouse franchisor based in Wilmington, North Carolina

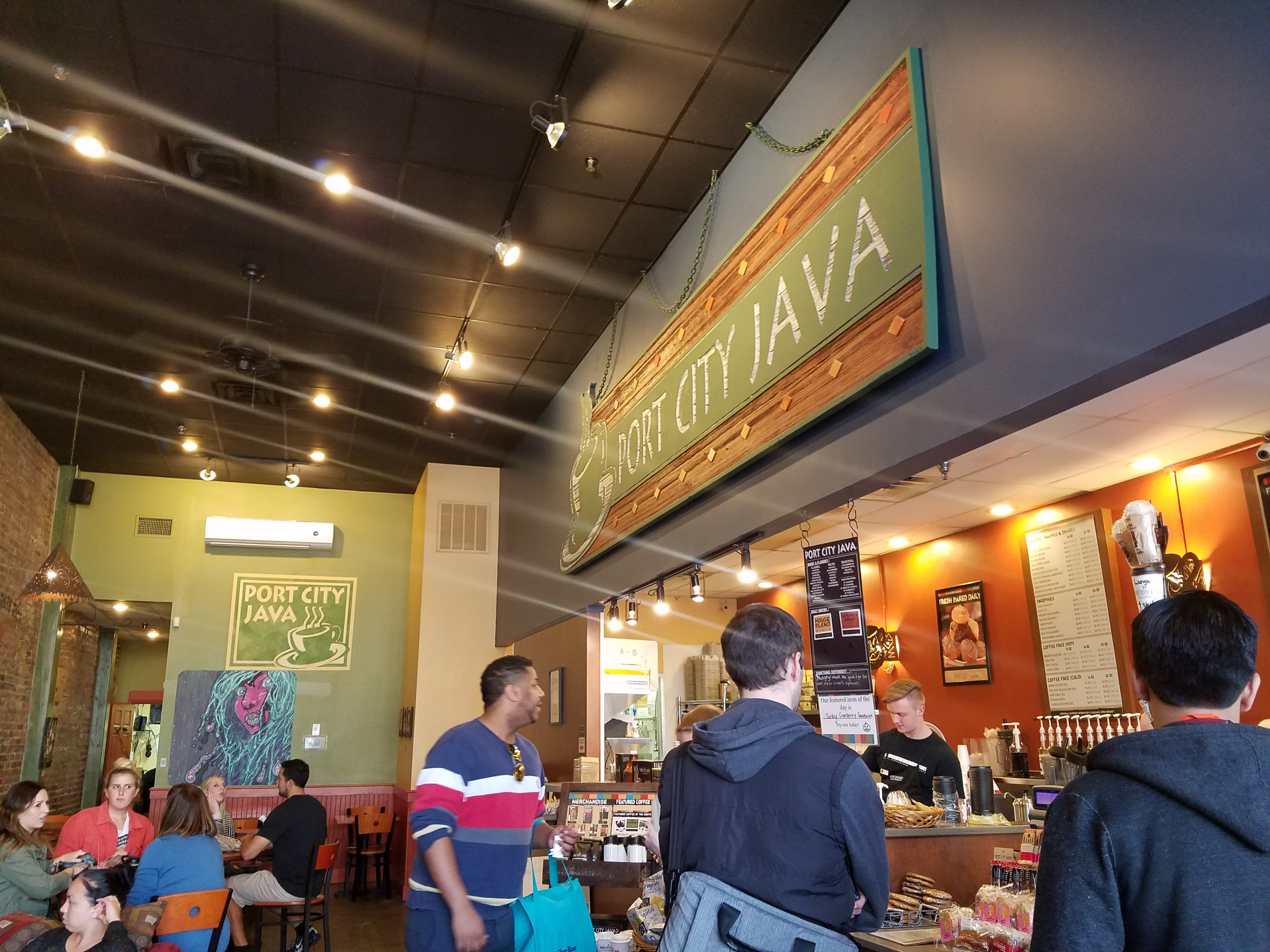
- The interior of the Port City Java on Front St in downtown Wilmington, North Carolina
- Company type: privately held
- Industry: Restaurants; Retail Coffee and Tea; Retail Beverages
- Founded: 1995, franchising since 2003
- Headquarters: Wilmington, North Carolina, United States
- Number of locations: 25+
- Area served: Southeastern US
- Products: Whole Bean Coffee; Boxed Tea; Made-to-order beverages
- Owner: W. Cecil Worsley III
- Number of employees: 125+
- Website: http://www.portcityjava.com

Port City Java is a specialty coffee roaster and coffeehouse franchisor based in Wilmington, North Carolina. Founded in 1995, it has over 25 cafes in the United States. The company was named #31 in Entrepreneur Magazines Top 50 New Franchises. Port City Java serves specialty coffee beverages in addition to smoothies, shakes, teas, breakfast all day, and a selection of lunch sandwiches.

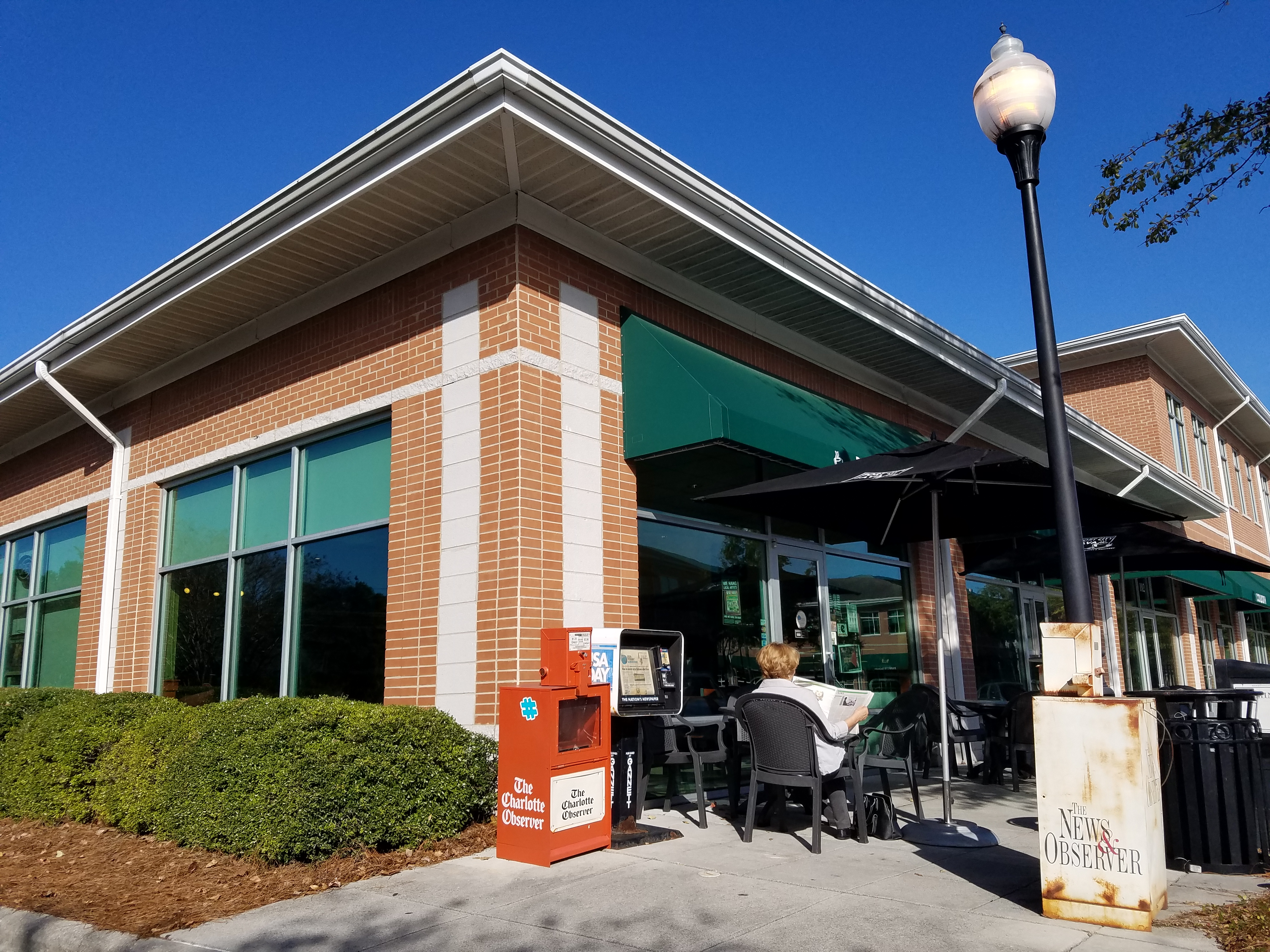
The exterior of the Port City Java in Barclay Commons in Wilmington, North Carolina.

== See also ==
- List of coffeehouse chains
