= Woods Coffee =

Coffee chain on the United States West Coast

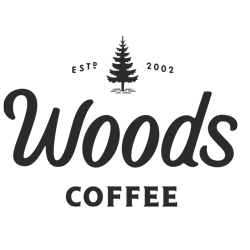

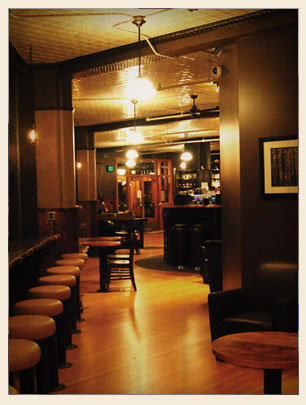
- Woods Coffee's location in the Flatiron Building in Bellingham, Washington
- Industry: Restaurants; Retail coffee and tea
- Founded: Lynden, Washington (2002)
- Headquarters: Lynden, Washington
- Number of locations: 20 (as of 2024)
- Area served: Western Washington
- Products: Whole Bean Coffee; Made-to-order beverages Baked goods Merchandise; Frappe beverages Smoothies
- Number of employees: 200 (as of 2011)
- Website: WoodsCoffee.com

Woods Coffee is a regional coffeehouse chain based in the Pacific Northwest, with 20 coffeehouse locations. It is based in Bellingham, Washington, and primarily serves northwestern Washington. The chain was founded in Lynden, Washington, in 2002.

== History ==
Woods Coffee was established in 2002 by the Herman family of Lynden, Washington. With a dream of starting a chain of coffee shops, the Hermans pooled their talents and resources to create the first Woods Coffee shop in Lynden.

In early 2005, Woods Coffee updated their earlier customer loyalty program, one involving paper cards that were punched at the time of purchase. The new system used radio-frequency identification (RFID) embedded in plastic cards suitable for carrying in a wallet or on a keychain. The RFID system was named SpeedBean, and by 2007 when Woods Coffee operated six coffee shops, about 7,500 SpeedBean cards were in use, carried by about 40% of customers. The cards were replenished automatically with funds drawn from the customer's bank account or credit card. The system accounted for 26% of all transactions in 2007, and it was determined that customers using the RFID system spent 22% more than customers paying cash.

In October 2008, the Bellingham/Whatcom Chamber of Commerce & Industry chose Woods Coffee as the Green Business of the Year. Two months later, The Bellingham Herald in its annual awards issue announced Woods Coffee as the best local coffee. The next year, the newspaper announced that the company ran the best coffee shop.

In January 2011, Woods Coffee opened their own bakery and introduced a line of in-house baked goods after realizing that outsourcing the baking to other companies did not maintain the quality of non-Fair Trade goods the company regularly sold, including sandwiches and bakery products.

In January 2014, Woods Coffee began serving its own in-house roasted coffee. and in April 2016, Woods Coffee opened Woods Coffee Roastery, a public roasting and tasting room, which includes a brew bar and a 300-gallon twin tank cold brew system.

In 2019, Kelly Spiker, Woods Coffee's chief operating officer at the time, expressed a plan in growing the company by two to five locations per year.

== Locations ==
Woods Coffee's first coffee shop was opened in February 2002 near Bender Fields in Lynden, Washington. The chain has since opened other locations in the Lynden area.

A Bellevue store opened in 2016 was the chain's first King County location.

The company opened its first Canadian location in Tsawwassen, British Columbia, in July 2016. It remained the sole international location of Woods Coffee until it closed in 2019 and was replaced with a new coffeeshop that retained the same staff.

== Coffee Cup Sculpture Controversy ==
In 2011, founder Wes Herman announced plans to create a sculpture that was to be built in front of their Flatiron location in Bellingham, Washington. The sculpture design was chosen in a community contest, and was to depict a "coffee cup pouring coffee onto the sidewalk". The plan was opposed by some residents of the city primarily over environmental concerns about depicting a disposable cup and opposition to the logo on the cup. Initially, City representatives informally went along with the idea. However, a more formal investigation showed that the private property location was smaller than originally thought, and would have some difficulty being approved by the City Planning Department. " 'We had responses that were both positive and not positive, and the not positive group was very vocal,' said Herman, noting that's not what they intended when they created the design contest." Herman said that he still wants to do something to support the Arts District.
