= Bourbon Coffee =

Coffeehouse chain based in Kigali, Rwanda

- Founded: 2007; 18 years ago
- Headquarters: Kigali, Rwanda
- Website: bourboncoffeeusa.com

Bourbon Coffee is a coffeehouse chain based in Kigali, Rwanda. It has currently 8 coffeehouses in Kigali, the first one at Union Trade Centre (UTC) in Kiyovu, the second one at the MTN centre in Nyarutarama, and others at Kigali International Airport.

It has also expanded to the United States market, opening locations simultaneously in Boston and in Washington, D.C. at 2101 L St NW.

It did also have a branch in the United Kingdom, but this has since closed.

== See also ==
- List of coffeehouse chains
