= 5 to go =

Romanian coffee shop chain

- Company type: Private
- Industry: Coffee
- Founded: 2015; 11 years ago
- Founders: Radu Savopol; Lucian Bădilă
- Headquarters: Bucharest, Romania
- Number of locations: 650+ (2024)
- Area served: Romania, Hungary, Bulgaria, Republic of Moldova, Ireland
- Products: Coffee; Tea and herbal teas; Made-to-order beverages; Assorted food; Bottled beverages; Smoothies
- Website: fivetogo.ro

5 to go is a Romanian coffee chain founded in Bucharest in 2015 by Radu Savopol and Lucian Bădilă. The brand quickly gained popularity due to its unique pricing strategy, initially offering all items for a fixed price of 5 RON (Romanian leu), which translates to approximately €1 or $1.20. This approach made specialty coffee and a variety of other products accessible to a wider audience.

== History ==
The first 5 to go café opened in February 2015 in Bucharest. The concept was developed to cater to the fast-paced lifestyle of urban residents, providing high-quality coffee and snacks at an affordable price. The chain expanded rapidly due to its successful business model and strong customer demand.

== Expansion ==
By 2020, 5 to go had grown to over 150 locations, not only in Bucharest but also in other major Romanian cities, making it one of the largest coffee chains in the country. The expansion included both company-owned and franchise-operated stores. The brand's growth strategy focused on maintaining low prices while ensuring quality and consistency across all outlets.

As of 2024, 5 to go operated over 650 branches, extending its reach beyond Romania with several new locations in Hungary. The company planned to enter the Slovakian and Bulgarian markets in 2024. This international growth marks a significant milestone for the brand, showcasing its appeal and adaptability in new markets.

== Products ==
5 to go offers a range of coffee-based beverages, including espresso, cappuccino, and latte, as well as a variety of teas, fresh juices, and smoothies. The menu also includes pastries, sandwiches, and other snacks.

== Awards and recognition ==
The chain has received several awards and recognitions for its innovative business model and rapid growth. In 2018, 5 to go won the "Best Romanian Brand" award at the Forbes Brands for the Future Gala. Radu Savopol, co-founder of 5 to go, received the Outstanding Contribution to the European Coffee Industry award at the 2023 European Coffee Awards gala in Barcelona.

== See also ==
- Coffee house
- List of coffeehouse chains
