= Double Coffee =

Company based in Riga

Double Coffee logo

A Double Coffee Restaurant in Riga

Double Coffee was a coffee house company founded in 2002 mainly based in Latvia. The majority of the company's locations were in Riga, Latvia. It also had cafes in Cairo, Egypt, Kazakhstan, Estonia, Lithuania, Belarus, China, Russia, Ukraine and Azerbaijan.

== History ==
The first Double Coffee cafe opened on 26 September 2002, in the city of Riga, on Stabu Street. The year it was founded it won the best trader in Riga 2002, and also the best Latvian trader 2002. Five new Double Coffee houses opened in 2003 and at the end of 2005 there were 16 in Latvia with branches subsequently opening in Estonia, Lithuania, Belarus and Ukraine. The chain opened its first non-European branch in June 2009 in Beijing, China In 2009, the Estonian section of the chain went bankrupt, followed in 2011 by bankruptcy in Lithuania and a withdrawal from both those countries' markets. The company suffered significant financial losses during the COVID-19 pandemic due to enforced closures of its cafes as a result of restrictions to reduce the spread of the disease. This led to permanent closures and in 2023 the chain ceased to exist due to mounting tax debts.

== See also ==
- List of coffeehouse chains
