= Tomoca Coffee =

Ethiopian coffee company

- Type: Private
- Industry: Coffeehouse chain, coffee production
- Founded: 8 February 1953; 73 years ago
- Number of locations: 22 (2015)
- Area served: Worldwide
- Key people: Wondwossen Meshesha (Operation manager)
- Products: Roasted coffee Italian-style coffee made with Ethiopian arabica beans
- Brands: Dark Roasted Harar ground coffee
- Revenue: no accurate figure
- Divisions: Tomoca Coffee Africa
- Website: www.tomocacoffeeafrica.com

Tomoca Coffee (also written TO.MO.CA) is a family-owned coffee company based in Addis Ababa, Ethiopia. It was established in February 1953. The company is known for its Italian-style coffee made with Ethiopian arabica beans.

The name derives from the Italian Torrefazione Moderna Café or "Modern coffee roasting".

== Overview ==
Tomoca is a member of the Ethiopia Commodity Exchange, and it exports its coffee to Sweden, Germany, the United States, Japan, and other countries. The company is led by Wondwossen Meshesha, the operations manager.

Tomoca has 22 branches in Addis Ababa and opened its first international branch in Tokyo in 2015. In September 2020, Tomoca opened its first coffee shop in Africa at the Two Rivers Mall in Nairobi, Kenya.

Tomoca is closely associated with macchiato, which is typically prepared using different roast profiles. The company uses dark, medium, and light roasts, with the dark roast traditionally serving as the default option. Depending on the location, customers may request alternative roast combinations when ordering beverages.

Beyond in-house beverage service, Tomoca produces and sells packaged coffee products, including whole roasted beans and ground coffee in multiple roast profiles.
