= Coffine Gurunaru =

South Korean coffeehouse chain

- Industry: Coffee shop
- Founded: South Korea (2007)
- Headquarters: Seoul, South Korea
- Number of locations: 120+ stores (2012)
- Website: Official website

Coffine Gurunaru is a South Korean coffee shop. It opened its first store near Seokchon Lake in December 2007. Unlike other brands, it sells wine in addition to coffee. Its most popular menu items include Jeju Love Hallabong Juice, Honey Butter Bread Origin, and Iced Americano. Jeju Love Hallabong Juice proved its popularity, surpassing 3 billion won in sales alone within a year and a half of its launch. "Coffine" is an abbreviation of "coffee" and "wine". "Gurunaru" means a tree, a shelter under a canopy, a comfortable space for leisure. The interior emphasises luxury by using purple, a colour favoured by the upper class and aristocracy.

== History ==
- August 2007: Coffine Grunaru established.
- December 2007: Coffine Grunaru's first Seokchon Lake branch opened.
- October 2009: Headquarters building completed and relocated to Bangi-dong.
- November 2009: Coffine Grunaru franchise business launched.
- July 2010: Awarded the Quality Satisfaction Award by Women Business Owners.
- August 2010: Coffine Grunaru Education Academy established.
- November 2010: Industry-Academic Collaboration Agreement signed with Baekseok Culture University and others.
- December 2010: Venture and Innobiz Company certifications obtained.
- December 2012: Awarded the Korea Knowledge Management Award.
- October 2013: Opened the first store in Mexico.
- April 2014: Malaysia opening confirmed.

== Store Locations ==
- Olympic Hall Branch: 424 Olympic-ro, Songpa-gu, Seoul
- Eungam Branch: 2nd and 3rd floors, 29-1 Eungam-ro 22-gil, Eunpyeong-gu, Seoul
- Seongdong Cultural Center Branch: 275-1 Wangsimni-ro, Seongdong-gu, Seoul
- Bukcheonan DT Branch: 20 Sindangsateo 2-gil, Seobuk-gu, Cheonan-si, Chungcheongnam-do

== Overseas Expansion ==
Coffine Grunaru has become the first Korean coffee company to enter the Mexican market. It opened its first store in Zona Rosa, Mexico's equivalent of Myeong-dong. Coffine Grunaru plans to target the Malaysian market by developing both domestic and local menus, starting with its signature dish, "Honey Butter Bread." Beyond Mexico, the company will also expand into the Malaysian market. The company plans to open three directly managed stores, including one in a major shopping mall in Kuala Lumpur, Malaysia, through a master franchise model.
