= Nedelya (pastry shop) =

Bulgarian pastry shop chain

- Company type: Private
- Industry: Pastry shop Coffeehouse
- Founded: 1993 (33 years ago)
- Founders: Georgi Minchev; Radoslava Mincheva
- Headquarters: Sofia, Bulgaria
- Number of locations: 57 (2024)
- Area served: Bulgaria, Romania
- Products: Cakes, pastries, and coffee
- Website: nedelya.com

Nedelya (Bulgarian: Неделя, Sunday) is a Bulgarian pastry shop and coffeehouse chain headquartered in Sofia, Bulgaria. Founded in 1993 in Sofia by married couple Georgi and Radoslava Minchevi, it is the biggest pastry shop chain in the country. With a large focus on cakes, the chain also offers other pastries and coffee at its locations. In 2015, the chain expanded into neighboring Romania, with plans to expand into Hungary and Austria in the future. As of October 2024, the chain has 57 locations across Bulgaria and Romania, including both corporate-owned and franchised shops.

== See also ==
- Pastries
- Pastry shop
