= Filli Cafe =

Teahouse chain

- Type: Private
- Industry: Teahouse
- Founded: 2004; 22 years ago
- Founder: Rafih Filli
- Headquarters: Business Tower, Office 1404 Burjuman, Dubai, United Arab Emirates
- Website: fillicafe.com

Filli Cafe is a Dubai-based international café chain specializing in tea, best known for its signature Zafran Tea. The brand operates multiple outlets across 15 countries, including the UAE, India, UK and the United States.

== History ==
=== Founder ===
The company was established in 2004 by Rafih Filli who took over a small, existing cafeteria. He rebranded the establishment as Filli Cafe. In the early years, he introduced Zafran Tea, a saffron-based milk tea, which became the company's most recognisable product. Later, during the company’s growth phase, Rafih Filli served as its chief executive officer, overseeing efforts related to diversification and international expansion.

=== Expansion ===
By the mid-2010s, Filli Cafe had expanded into a multi-outlet chain across Dubai and other emirates. After establishing a presence in the UAE, Filli Cafe expanded into other GCC markets. In 2016, Filli Cafe opened its first outlet outside of the UAE in Qatar. From the late 2010s onwards, the company announced entry to additional international markets, including India, Pakistan, Sri Lanka, the UK, Australia and the USA.

The company operates through a hybrid model of company-owned stores (primarily in the UAE) and franchise partnerships for international markets. The company's business expansion has been the subject of a teaching case study designed for use in graduate-level business courses. The study examines the company's challenges in scaling an ethnic culinary concept and maintaining brand equity during global franchising.

== Products ==
The brand's flagship product is Zafran Tea, a strong tea blend prepared with milk, sugar and saffron. The tea is mentioned in the international travel guide Lonely Planet, where Filli Cafe is listed under the guide's "Best Karak Spots" section in the UAE. Some international franchise outlets of the brand also have food and beverage items tailored to local preferences on their menu.
