= Kopi Janji Jiwa =

Indonesian coffeehouse chain

- Company's logo since August 2023
- Type: Privately held company
- Industry: Coffeehouse
- Founded: 15 May 2018; 8 years ago
- Founder: Billy Kurniawan
- Headquarters: Jakarta, Indonesia
- Number of locations: 900+ (2022)
- Area served: All of Indonesia
- Key people: Billy Kurniawan (founder and CEO)); Michael Tarjoto (COO); Gerry Narayan (CTO)
- Products: Coffee, milk, toast, tea, hamburger
- Number of employees: 3000 (2023)
- Parent: Jiwa Group
- Website: jiwagroup.com

Kopi Janji Jiwa (Janji Jiwa Coffee) is an Indonesian coffee shop chain known for serving local coffee beverages with a Grab-and-Go concept. This coffee shop chain is owned by Jiwa Group (PT Luna Boga Narayan), which also owns several other brands for tea, toast, and hamburgers. As of 2022, Kopi Janji Jiwa has over 900 coffee shops across Indonesia.

== History ==
Kopi Janji Jiwa was founded by Billy Kurniawan on 15 May 2018 in Jakarta. Before establishing this company, Billy owned a bubble tea shop called Calais. In its early days, Kopi Janji Jiwa had only one outlet at ITC Kuningan, South Jakarta, selling coffee-based beverages with a sales volume of 10 cups per day. However, the coffee shop chain now sells millions of cups of coffee each month.

In 2019, Jiwa Group launched its second brand, Jiwa Toast. This chain offers a menu of toast with a variety of toppings and flavors. Later, they introduced Jiwa Tea, a brand for tea products, in 2020, and Burger Geber, a brand for hamburgers, in 2023. These three additional brands have been included in several Kopi Janji Jiwa outlets; older outlets typically feature only one, two, or three brands, while newer outlets accommodate all four brands.

In 2020, Jiwa Group launched a digital-based online ordering application called JIWA+ that supports the Grab & Go concept.

In 2021, Jiwa Group received funding from two investors, Openspace and Capsquare Asia Partners. Both venture capital investors have best practices in the local and regional value-chain market.

In 2023, Jiwa Group launched a program called Kopi Sejuta Jiwa (KSJ). This program involves selling coffee on the go using electric bicycles. As of September 2023, Jiwa Group had operated 50 KSJ electric bicycles.

As of February 2025, Kopi Janji Jiwa has more than 600 outlets, 50 products that are spread across over 100 cities.

== Awards ==
- MURI Record for the Fastest Growing Coffee Shop in One Year.
- Top Brand Award in the coffee shop category.
- Brand of the Year from the World Branding Awards (2022–2023) in the Retailer Coffee category.

== Gallery ==
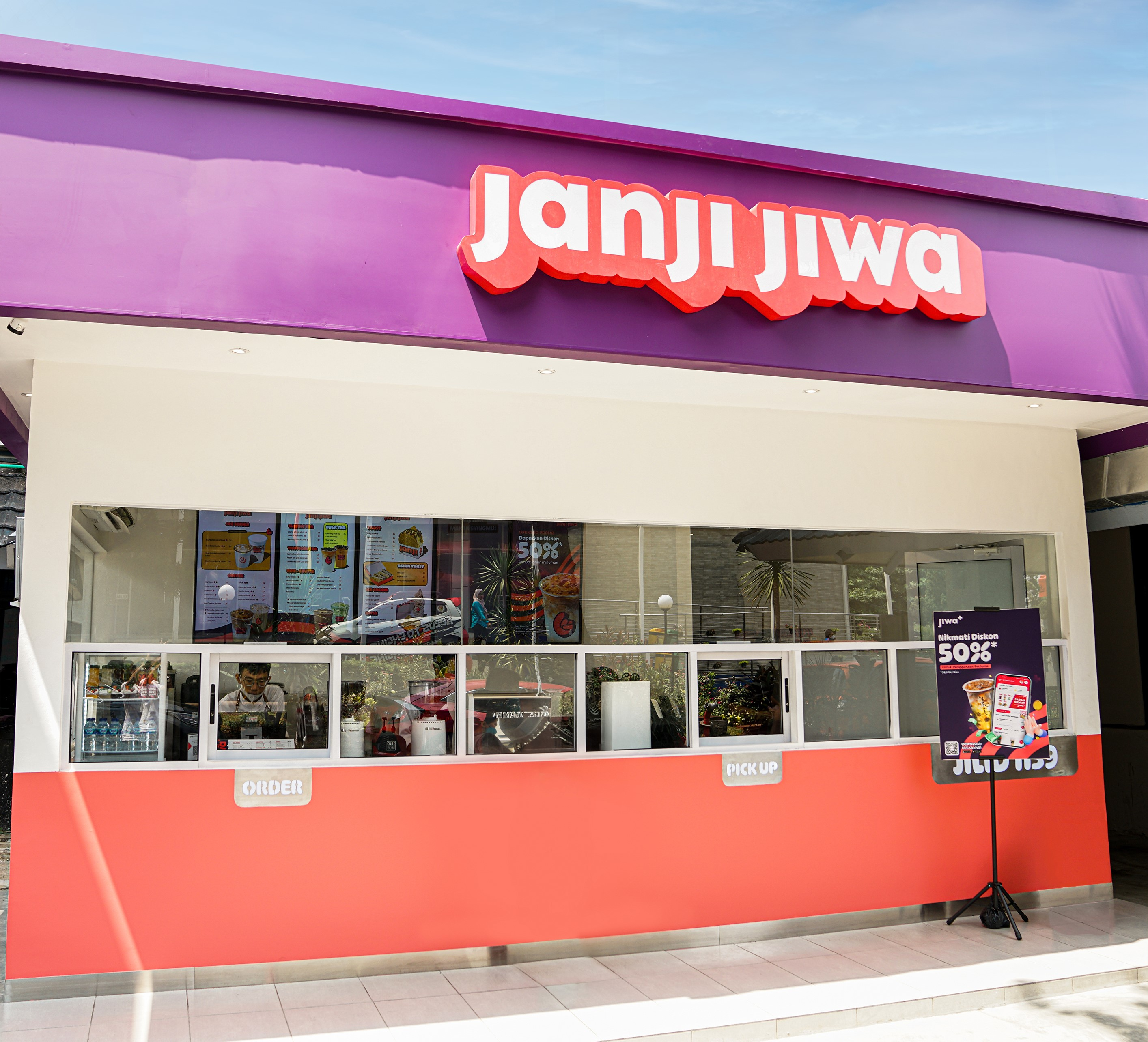
Kopi Janji Jiwa outlet in Fatmawati General Hospital, Jakarta.

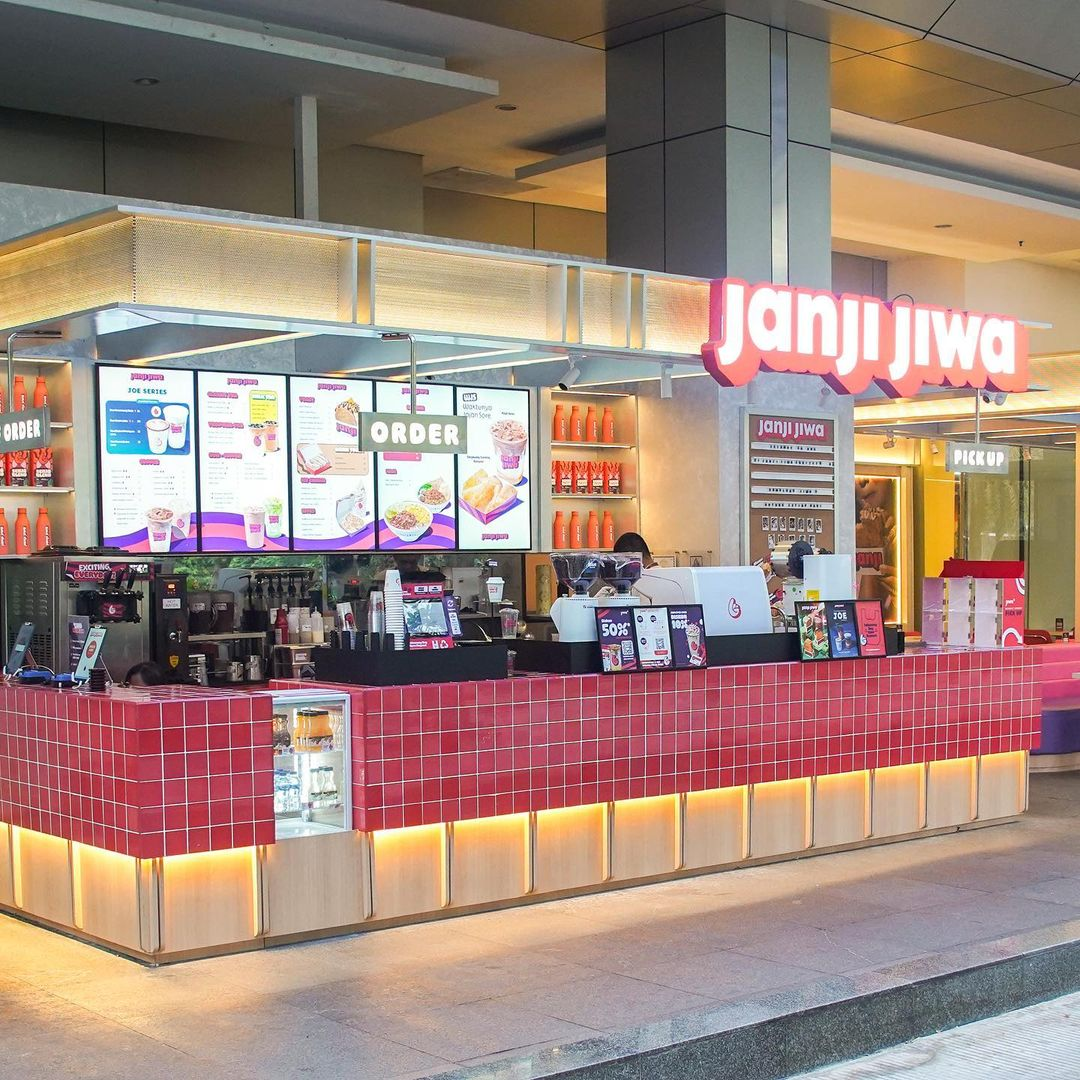
Kopi Janji Jiwa outlet in Equity Tower, South Jakarta.
