= Maman (café) =

Washington D.C.-based coffee roaster

- Company type: Private
- Founded: October 2014; 11 years ago SoHo, New York City, United States
- Founder: Elisa Marshall; Benjamin Sormonte
- Headquarters: New York City, United States
- Website: Official website

Maman is an American French-inspired chain of bakery-cafes, headquartered in New York City. It was founded in October 2014, and as of June 2024, the company has 37+ stores across the United States and Canada. The cafe currently serves coffee, pastries, and French cuisine.

== History ==
French for "mother", Maman was founded by Canadian Elisa Marshall and French Benjamin Sormonte in October 2014, with the first location opening up in the SoHo neighborhood of Manhattan, New York City. Following this, the company opened their second location in Toronto.

Maman's Holiday Trio 12-Cookie Gift Box (which includes the Nutty Chocolate Chip, White Chocolate Candy Cane Pretzel, and Gingerbread Oatmeal Raisin cookies) was named on Oprah's Favorite Things list of 2017.

In 2020, TriSpan, a London and New York-based private equity firm, came aboard, acquiring 50%, with the remainder owned by Marshall and Soromonte.

== Locations ==
=== United States ===
==== New York ====
- SoHo, Manhattan

==== New Jersey ====
- Jersey City

==== Maryland ====
- Bethesda

==== Virginia ====
- Fairfax
- Old Town Alexandria

==== Washington, D.C. ====
- Georgetown
- Union Market
- Penn Quarter
- DuPont

==== Florida ====
- Miami Beach

==== Connecticut ====
- Greenwich

==== Pennsylvania ====
- Ardmore

=== Canada ===
- Toronto
- Montreal

== Lifestyle brand ==
Maman has expanded to selling a cookbook and apparel, including children's clothing and a partnership with baby apparel brand, Lalo.
