= SPR Coffee =

Coffee shop chain in China and Taiwan

Logo

SPR Coffee is a coffee chain operating in China and Taiwan. It entered mainland China in 2001 and in 2010 claimed 545 franchises worldwide. In March 2011 Asia Times Online counted SPR Coffee, with another originally Taiwanese competitor UBC Coffee, as one of the major competitors with Starbucks and Costa Coffee "competing for a slice of China's coffee pie."
