= Java House =

Kenyan coffee house chain

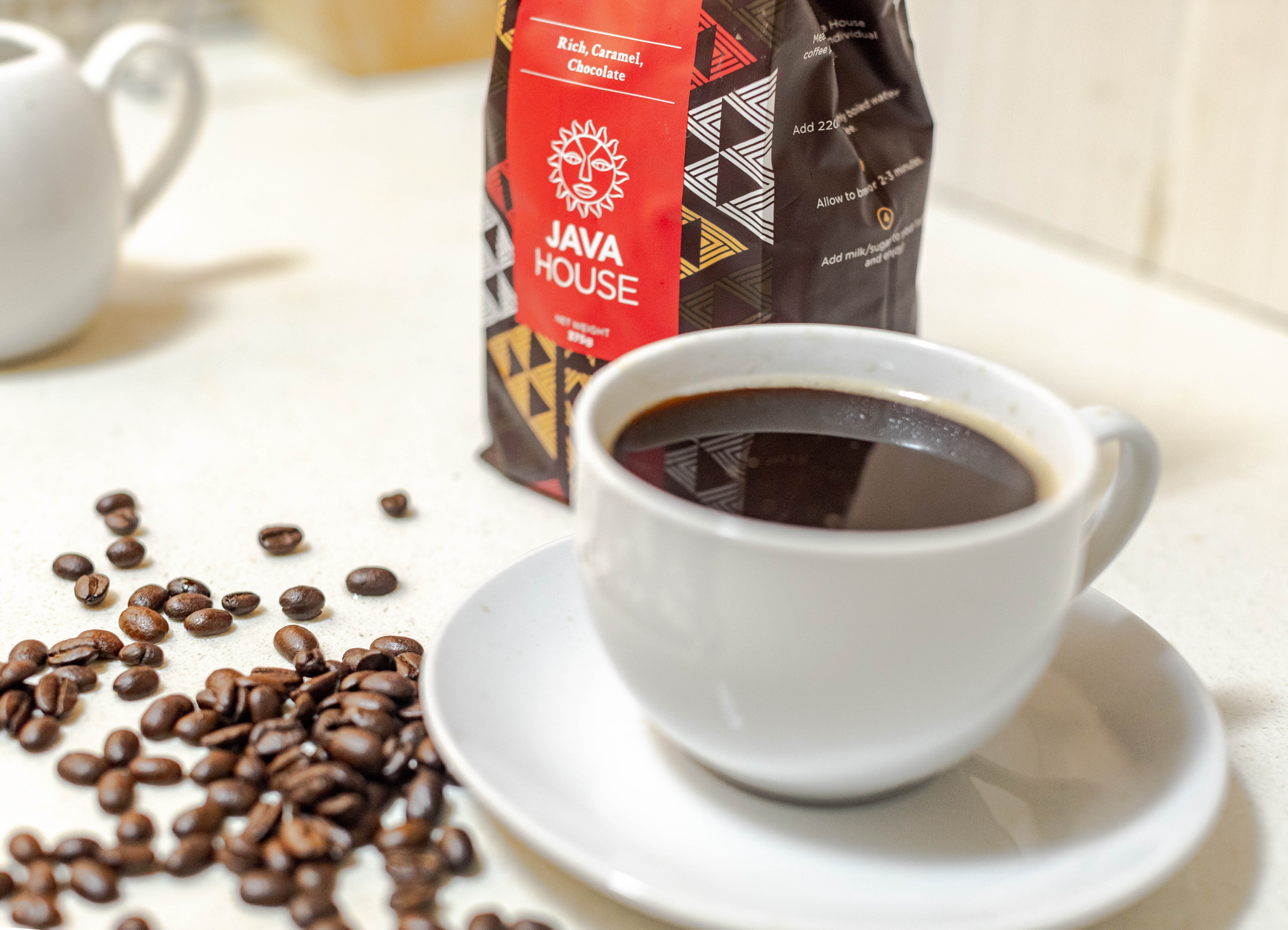

Restaurant information
- Established: 1999
- Location: Nairobi, Kenya
- Other information: Coffee house

Java House (formerly Nairobi Java House) is a chain of coffee houses with its head office at ABC Place in Nairobi, Kenya, founded in 1999 by Kevin Ashley and Jon Wagner. When founded, it was one of the few places to find "export-quality" Kenyan coffee brewed and served in the region, although specialty coffee culture has seen a significant increase in Kenya in recent years.

Starting from the first cafe at Adam's Arcade along Ngong Road which opened in 1999. Java House has grown to 73 locations across East Africa as of June 2024. The Java brand is also the owner of Italian pizza chain 360 Degrees Pizza and the first ever East African self-service frozen yoghurt store, Planet Yogurt.

== Corporate governance ==
=== Past Chief Executive Officers ===
Kevin Ashley (2010–2016)

- Co-founded Nairobi Java House in 1999.
- Oversaw the company's growth from a single brand, Nairobi Java House, in Kenya to multiple brands in Kenya and Uganda.
- Completed the sale of Java House to Emerging Capital Partners in 2012.

Ken Kuguru (2016–2018)

- Grew Java House to 60+ stores across 10 cities in Kenya, Uganda and Rwanda.
- In 2017, led the company to one of the most successful private equity F&B deals in East Africa to date.

Paul Smith (2018 - 2021)

- Paul's principal role is the development and implementation of the Group's growth and development strategies.

Derrick Van Houten 2021 - 2022

Priscilla Gathungu 2022 - Present Group CEO Priscilla is the Group Chief Executive Officer at Java House Group. 2022 - Present

Priscilla was appointed as Group CEO in November 2022.
