= Aroma Joe's =

Drive-thru centered coffee company

- Industry: Coffee
- Founded: 2000
- Headquarters: Scarborough, Maine,
- Number of locations: 100+
- Website: https://aromajoes.com/

Aroma Joe's is an American chain of coffee shops. A drive-thru-centered coffee company, Aroma Joe's was founded in 2000 in East Rochester, New Hampshire, and is now headquartered in Scarborough, Maine, United States. There are over 100 locations across Maine, New Hampshire, Massachusetts, Pennsylvania, Florida, Connecticut, and New York.

The company uses Rainforest Alliance-certified beans to ensure sustainable farming practice.

== History ==
The first location was opened by four cousins (Marty McKenna, Tim McKenna, Mike Sillon, and Brian Sillon) in 2000.

In 2012, the company began franchising and also began selling a proprietary energy drink called AJ's Rush.
