= Pickup Coffee =

Philippine coffee shop chain

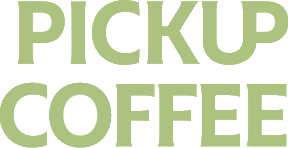

- Pickup Coffee in Recto station, Santa Cruz, Manila
- Industry: Coffee shop
- Founded: February 2022; 4 years ago Philippines
- Founders: Jaime Gonzalez; Bien Lee; Diego Lorenzo; Miguel Macaalay
- Area served: Philippines, Mexico
- Products: Coffee beverages; Tea beverages; baked goods
- Website: www.pickup-coffee.com

Pickup Coffee (stylized as PICKUP COFFEE) is a Philippine coffee shop chain established in 2022 in Taguig.

== History ==
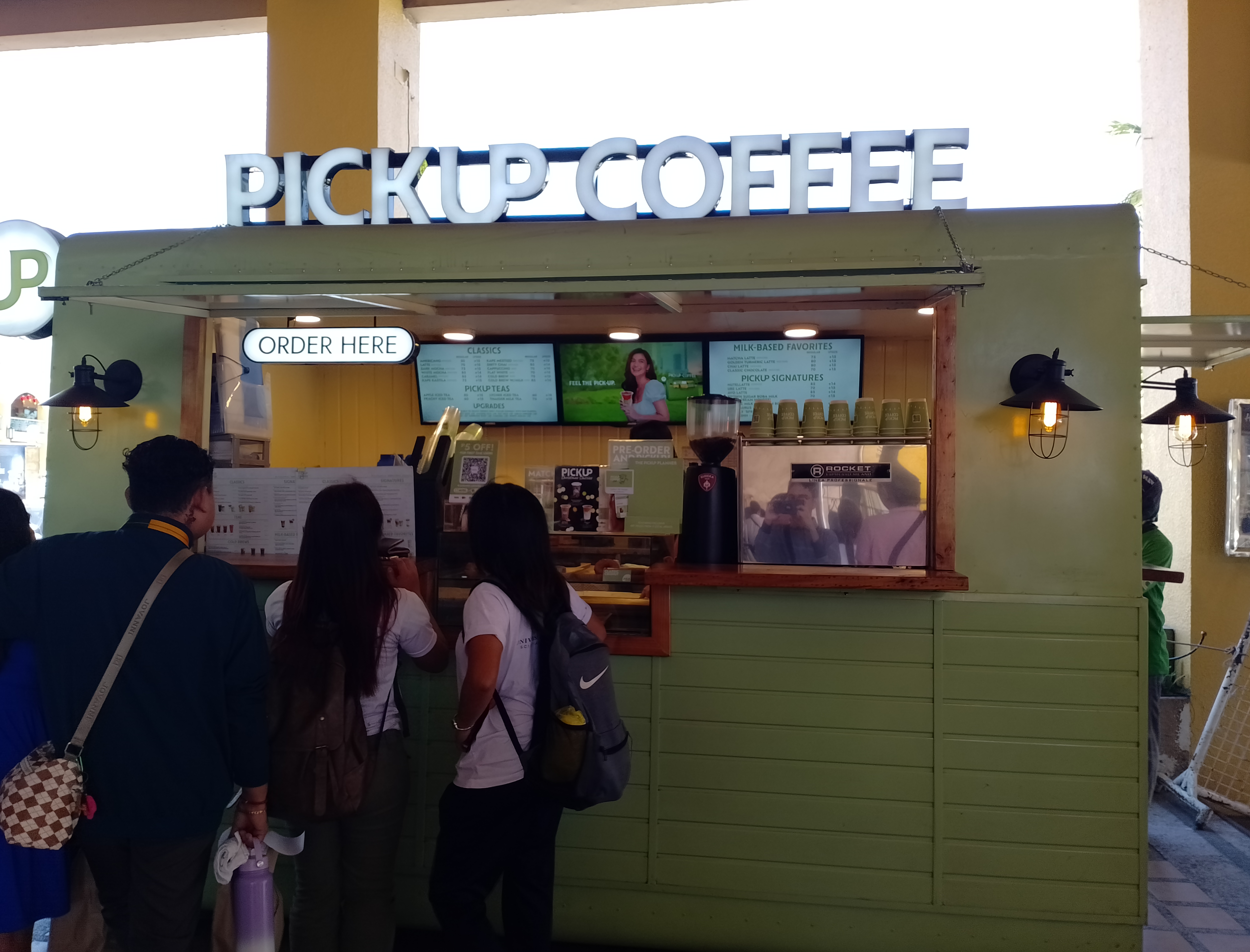
A Pickup Coffee outlet at Gaisano Country Mall, Cebu City

Pickup Coffee began as a delivery-centric coffee venture, founded by Jaime Gonzales, Bien Lee, Diego Lorenzo, and Miguel Macaalay in February 2022. It opened its first outlet in June 2022 at Uptown Mall in Bonifacio Global City, Taguig. Pickup Coffee would receive Series A1 funding from various Southeast Asian investors. By April 2023, the brand's valuation would be worth US$130 million (₱7.18 billion).

Initially limited to Metro Manila, Pickup Coffee expanded to Cebu in March 2023 and eventually to other provinces in the Philippines. In December 2023, Pickup Coffee expanded to Mexico and opened their first branch in the country. In mid-2024, Pickup Coffee launched their own dedicated mobile application for order and delivery. In 2026, Pickup Coffee opened the business for franchising. It has also began introducing traditional coffee shops where patrons can stay for longer periods of time as opposed to their prior grab-and-go outlets.

== Products ==
Pickup Coffee offers various beverages at standard prices not exceeding ₱100 as of October 2022. It has coffee (including cold brew), milk, and tea-based drinks in its menu, as well as baked goods and pastries.
