= Fore Coffee =

Indonesian coffee house chain

PT Fore Kopi Indonesia
- Industry: Coffeehouse
- Founded: August 2018; 8 years ago
- Headquarters: Jl. Hayam Wuruk No.28, Kebon Kelapa, Gambir, Central Jakarta, Jakarta 10120
- Number of locations: 210+ (2025)
- Area served: Indonesia
- Key people: Robin Boe (Founder); Willson Cuaca (Founder); Vico Lomar (Founder and CEO)
- Products: Coffee, Sandwich
- Website: fore.coffee

PT Fore Kopi Indonesia, operating under the business name Fore Coffee, is an Indonesian coffee house company. Founded in 2018, the company is an expansion of Otten Coffee, a coffee bean and machine retail business established by Robin Boe and Jhoni Kusno. Starting from a small booth on the second floor of the Otten Coffee store on Jalan Senopati, Jakarta, Fore Coffee now has more than 210 outlets across Indonesia.

== History ==
The history of Fore Coffee is closely tied to Otten Coffee, a company specializing in selling coffee beans and machines, founded by Robin Boe in 2012, with its first store located in Robin's hometown, Medan. Otten Coffee was funded by East Ventures, a venture capital firm established by Willson Cuaca. In August 2018, they opened their second store on Jalan Senopati, Kebayoran Baru, South Jakarta. As part of business expansion, Robin and Willson launched a coffee shop venture through a business incubator on the second floor of Otten Coffee's office in Jakarta. In addition to the two of them, a key figure in the establishment of Fore Coffee was Vico Lomar, who currently serves as the company's CEO. The name "Fore" is derived from the abbreviation of "forest"; Fore Coffee's vision is for their business to grow like a tree that supports the surrounding environment.

In February 2019, Fore Coffee raised US$8.5 million in a funding round from East Ventures, SMDV, Pavilion Capital, Agaeti Venture Capital, Insignia Ventures Partners, and undisclosed angel investors.

In the following years, Fore Coffee continued to expand its business by opening hundreds of outlets across Indonesia. By the end of 2024, it was reported that they operated 217 outlets. They have also expanded internationally by opening their first store overseas at Bugis Junction, Singapore, on 9 November 2023.

== Product ==
Fore Coffee uses Arabica beans curated from Gayo, Toraja, and West Java for all its coffee. One of the company's best-selling products is the Butterscotch Sea Salt Latte, a type of latte that combines butterscotch (a mixture of palm sugar and butter) with sea salt foam. Moreover, Fore Coffee offers non-coffee beverages such as tea and chocolate, as well as food like sandwiches. In its operations, the company relies on Orchestrale and Kees Van Der Westen espresso machines and Mazzer coffee grinders. The coffee-making equipment and beans used by Fore Coffee are also commercially sold by Otten Coffee. To promote its brand, Fore Coffee has collaborated with several renowned artists and creators, such as Olivia Lazuardy in the creation of the Rose Latte (a coffee with a rose flavor) and Vidi Aldiano for the launch of The Classic Treasure Series.
