= Louisa Coffee =

Taiwanese coffeehouse chain

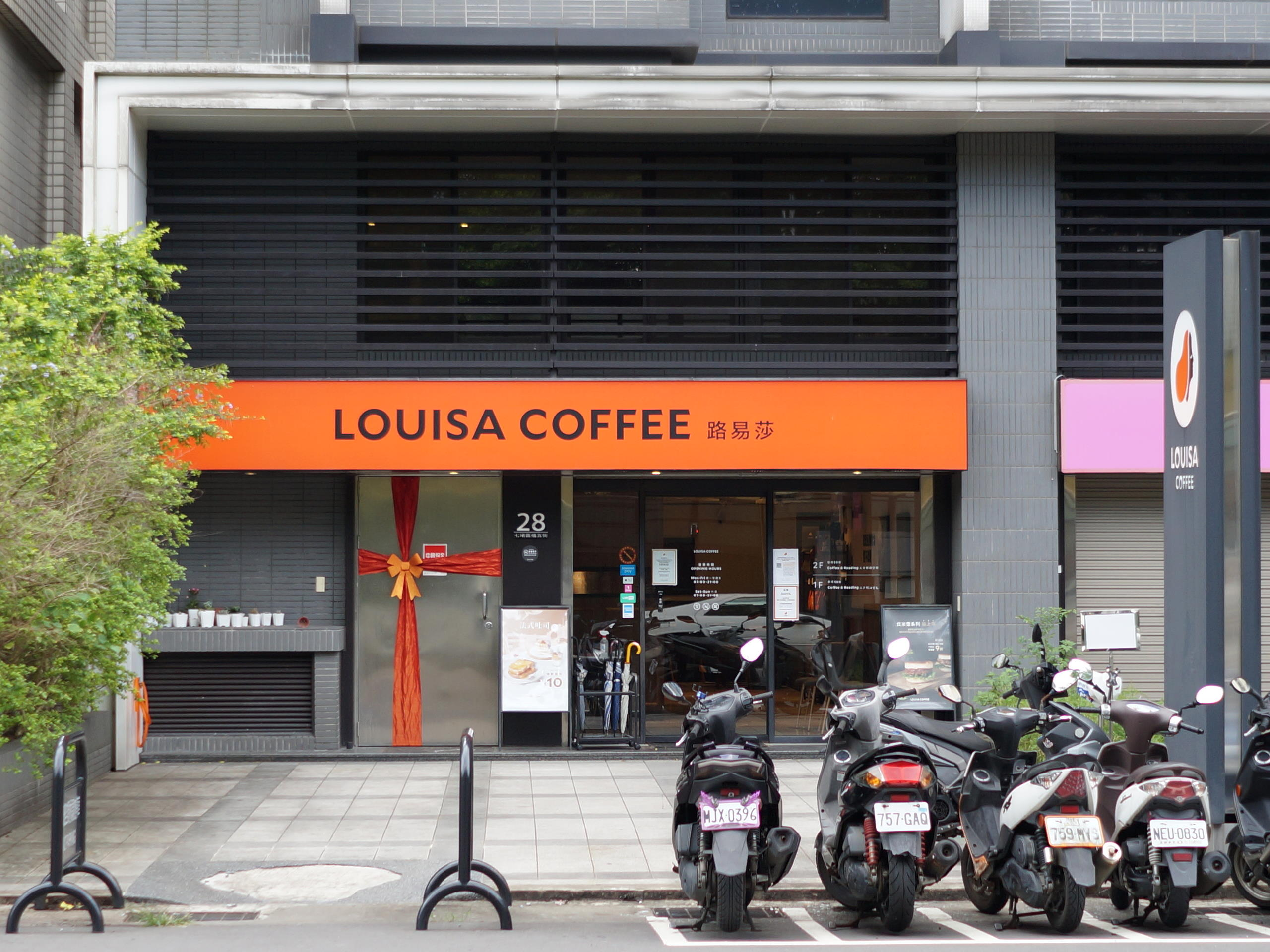
- Louisa Coffee store in Keelung, Taiwan
- Native name: 路易莎咖啡
- Type: Public
- Traded as: TPEx: 2758
- Industry: Coffee shop
- Founded: 2006
- Founders: Chris Huang
- Headquarters: Taipei, Taiwan
- Number of locations: 558 (2023)
- Area served: Worldwide
- Products: Coffee beverages
- Website: www.louisacoffee.co

Louisa Coffee (Chinese: 路易莎咖啡; pinyin: Lùyìshā Kāfēi) is a Taiwanese coffeehouse chain. The company began as a small coffee to-go shop in Taipei. In December 2019, it surpassed Starbucks as the chain with the most locations in Taiwan. Their first overseas location was opened in Bangkok, Thailand in March, 2019.

== History ==
In 2022, Lypid partnered with Louisa Coffee to bring plant-based burger patties to over 500 of their branches.

== See also ==
- List of coffeehouse chains
- List of companies of Taiwan
