= Coffee in Japan =

Japan has a coffee culture that has changed with societal needs over time. Today, coffee shops serve as a niche within their urban cultures. While it was introduced earlier in history during the sixteenth and seventeenth centuries by Dutch and Portuguese traders, it rapidly gained popularity at the turn of the twentieth century. It supports the social aspects of Japan, serving both as a space to connect but also to alleviate oneself from social pressures. Coffee is also defined by class interactions and classicist behaviors and has economic influence through the mass amount of import of coffee and the mass consumption of coffee in Japan in its many different forms.

== History ==
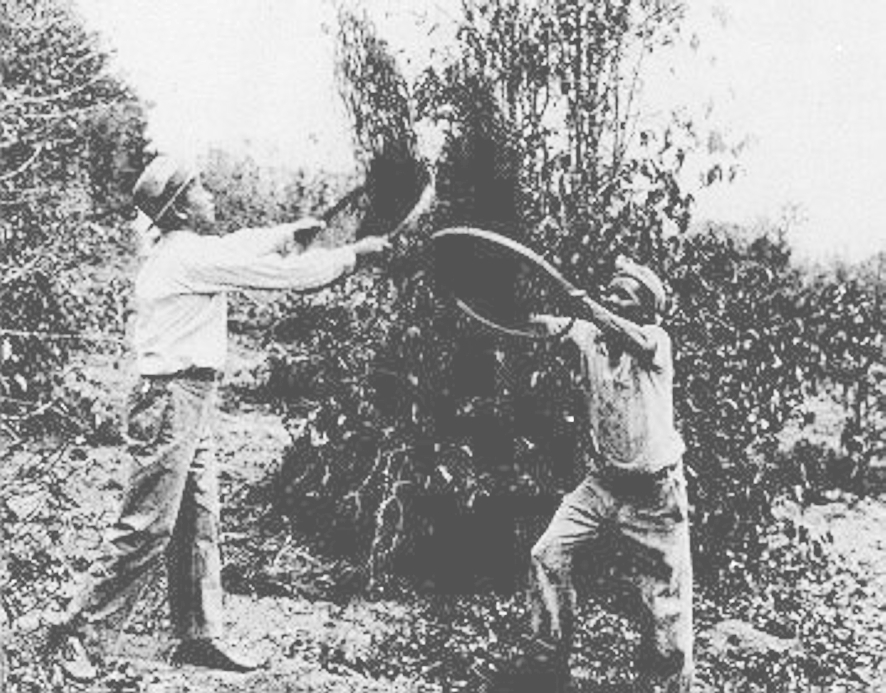
Japanese farm workers in Brazil working on coffee plantations

Coffee first arrived in Japan via Dutch traders in 1700. The first shop opened in 1888 and was called Kahiichakan. It lasted five years before going bankrupt. In 1933, Tadao Ueshima founded Ueshima Tadao Shoten in Kobe. Ueshima has since been dubbed the "Father of Coffee in Japan". During World War II, the Japanese established a ban on coffee imports until 1950. In 1969, Ueshima redeveloped and mass-produced the canned coffee making it a commodity to be consumed anywhere. Some canned coffee brands include "Boss (produced by Suntory), Georgia (produced by Coca-Cola), Nescafe (produced by Nestlé), and Roots (coffee product) (produced by Japan Tobacco)".

Following its brief stint in the Meiji period, coffee wove its way back into the Japanese markets in the 1960s. During World War II coffee import was banned in Japan as they were in conflict with the influential west. To measure its growth in consumption, Japan imported 15,000 tonnes back in 1960. Today, the numbers total over 440,000 tonnes. Japan's spike in coffee consumption can be linked to its fascination with western cultures leading to large investments. Mr. Ueshima also played a large role in the establishment of the All Japanese Coffee Association in 1980. In the same year, Doutor Coffee opened the country's first chain furthering the consumption and turning coffee into a valuable economic resource. Part of Doutor's success was its on-the-go environment. This facilitated and encouraged people to take their coffee with them to work and to school.

=== Types of coffee shops ===
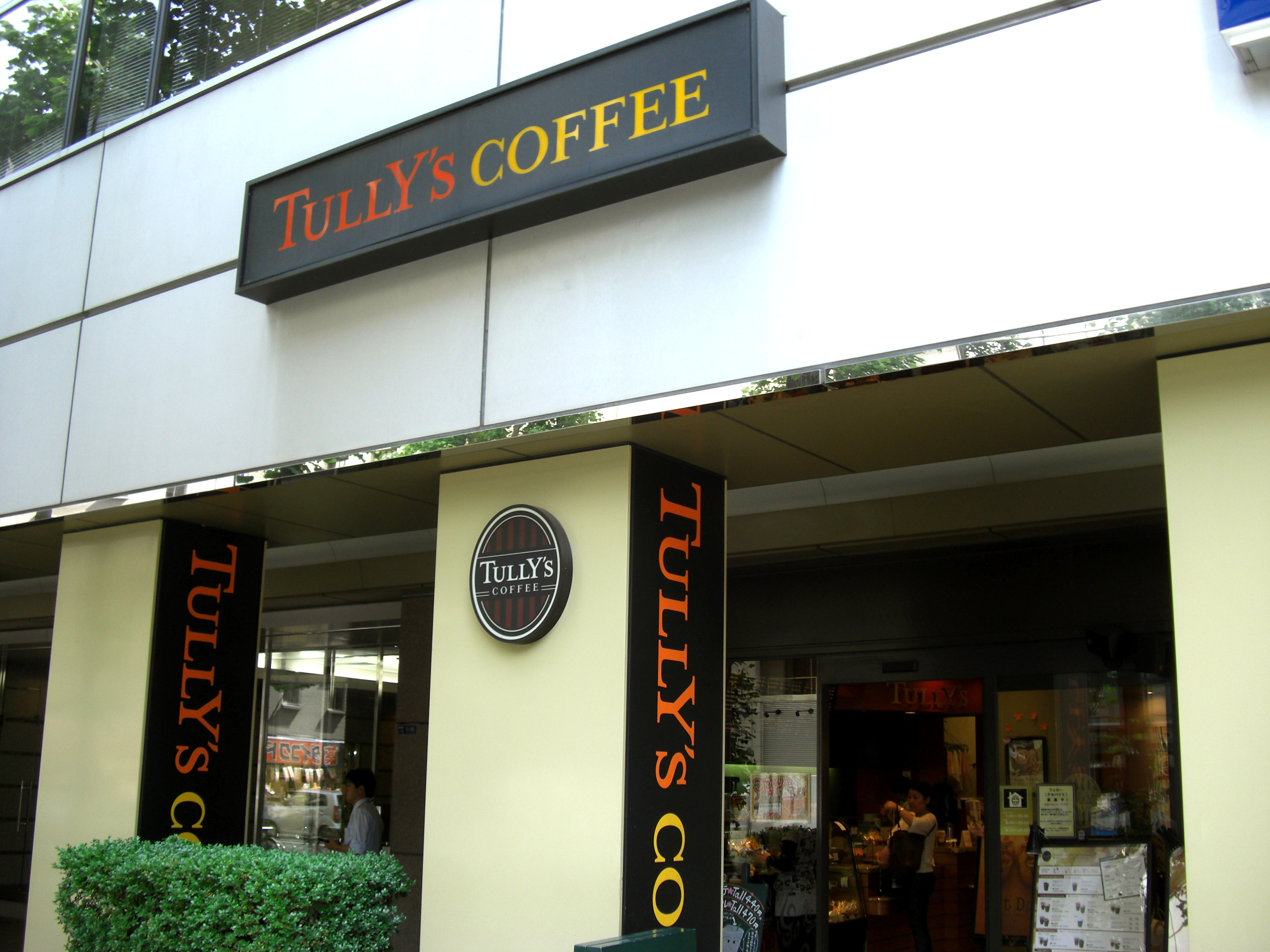
Tully's Coffee

Smaller chains battle to stay afloat by being known for their individual traits. For example, cafe Renoir is recognized by its plug-in and wireless access for customers. Another factor is smoking and as some customers appreciate a smoke and coffee, others despise the thought of smoking altogether. Smaller shops can better cater to the locals in terms of allowing smoking while larger chains like Starbucks, must follow company rules and ban it. Bigger chains like McDonald's and Starbucks are rooted in the west and have pushed themselves upon the growing coffee market in Japan through storefronts and stands.

Big or small, they both have been heavily influenced by the west. Smaller chains like Boss and Roots enlisted the help of prominent Americans Tommy Lee Jones (Boss) and Brad Pitt (Roots) to be their spokespeople and advertise for them. Bigger Chains like Starbucks emerged to capitalize on the new booming coffee industry in Japan. The first Starbucks opened in Ginza, Tokyo, in 1996. In 2005, they partnered with Suntory to sell their own canned coffee. Over time, Starbucks has grown to over 1,000 Japanese shops clustered around the cities. In response, McDonald's McCafe has sprouted up where instead of having a whole McDonald's store there is simply a stand selling McDonald's coffee. These standalone shops were officially established in 2007 and target coffee and small on-the-go treats. Tully's is a third foreign enterprise stemming out of Seattle, Washington. Its first shop opened in 1997, and grew to 513 by 2014.

Nowadays, convenience stores are taking up an increasing chunk of the Japanese coffee market. Popular convenience store, Seven-Eleven, for example, currently sells 1.1 billion take-out coffees annually.

== Culture ==
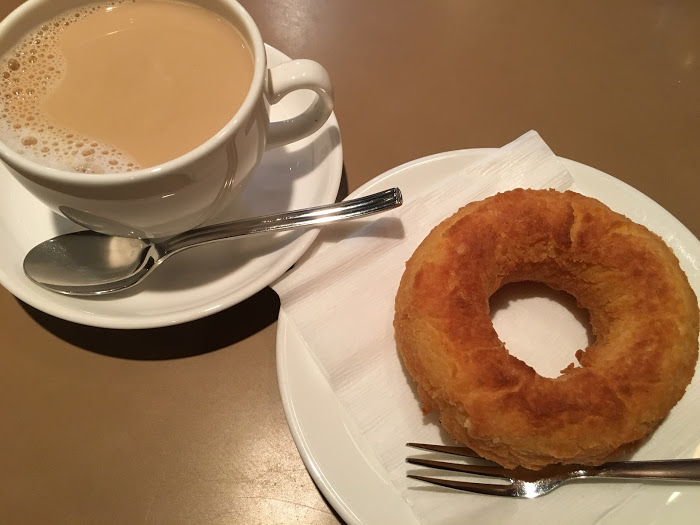
Donuts and milk coffee from Rokuyosha of Kyoto

Coffee culture in Japan is one of the most unique observed globally. One serving custom is that the cup handle is traditionally placed to the left of the drinker, while the spoon handle faces the right. Due to the product's foreign origins, Japanese coffee culture is heavily connected to the identity of being foreign or western. Coffee franchises such as Starbucks (whose first non-US location was in Japan) are viewed and enjoyed in the same way as the Disneyland franchise in Japan.

The perceived westernness of coffee culture resulted in the beverage being banned during World War II. In postwar Japan, Western products and goods were indicators of the new Japanese middle class. High-grade coffee equipment, as well as ground coffee, fell into this category. In the world of post-war Japan, jazz cafés and coffee they served were examples of Japan's efforts to modernize its culture and society in the vein of Western countries. Coffee shops were also cultural spots for progressive youths during the 1960s and 1970s, serving as meeting places for feminist movements and anti-government protests.

Coffee culture differs greatly from traditional Japanese tea culture. Coffee is primarily viewed as a solitary drink in the West, and Japan has a similar view of the beverage. In the 1960s and 1970s, coffee became popular with Japanese businessmen working alone in public. The social element of Japanese coffee itself is radically different from that of Japanese tea culture. In Japan, tea culture is a social, unifying event, expressed through the traditional Japanese tea ceremony, which is an expression of hospitality and respect towards friends and guests. Coffee shops and coffee produced there, on the other hand, serve a more disruptive social function. Coffee shops in Japan served as meeting places for social movements aimed at transforming and disrupting Japanese society during the 1970s and 1980s. These social movements include Japanese feminist groups and various anti-government movements.

While serving as a symbol for Japanese businessmen as well as youthful activists, types of coffee products also serve to illustrate a divide between age groups. Instant coffee is viewed as common, while ground and fresh coffee beans are viewed as luxury goods. Instant coffee is preferred by Japanese youth while ground coffee is enjoyed by successful middle-class Japanese adults.

== International connections ==
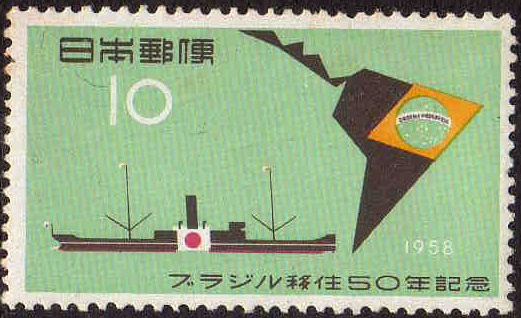
A Japanese-Brazilian stamp

Japanese coffee production is an international affair. Coffee beans sold and roasted in Japan are primarily grown in countries such as Brazil, Indonesia and other countries with warm climates. Between 1908 and 1924, roughly 35,000 Japanese citizens emigrated to Brazil to work on coffee farms. These Japanese Brazilians would then bring coffee back to Japan. Japan’s coffee culture has also adopted the language and terminology used in English speaking Western countries such as roast and drip rather than create Japanese terms.

Coffee brands in Japan are often marketed by Western actors such as Brad Pitt and Tom Selleck, further indicating the product's foreign identity.

== Economy ==
Historically, the economy of coffee shops boomed during the “bubble economy”, in which there was great economic growth, particularly commercially, despite the unstable nature of this expansion. Revenue as of 2019 was around 4 trillion yen, which translates to around US$37 billion. The major type of coffee that is the most popular is instant coffee, which accrued a revenue of around 3 trillion yen, or around US$28 billion, in 2019. The price of instant coffee per unit has gone up over the past couple of years, but roast coffee per unit has remained relatively stable. The large majority of coffee is consumed outside of the home, in bars and restaurants, proportional to in-home consumption. The largest company in the retail coffee segment is Nestlé, and the biggest company in the in-home and out-of-home coffee is JAB Holdings, which is Luxembourg-based. There has been a steady increase in coffee revenue in Japan over the past decade. Globally, they are the third country from the most revenue generated from coffee.

== See also ==
- Coffee in World Cultures: Japan
- History of Coffee: Japan
- Kissaten - Japanese coffeehouse usually caters coffee and tea
- Coffee in Taiwan
