= Taiwanese whisky =

Type of distilled liquor produced in Taiwan

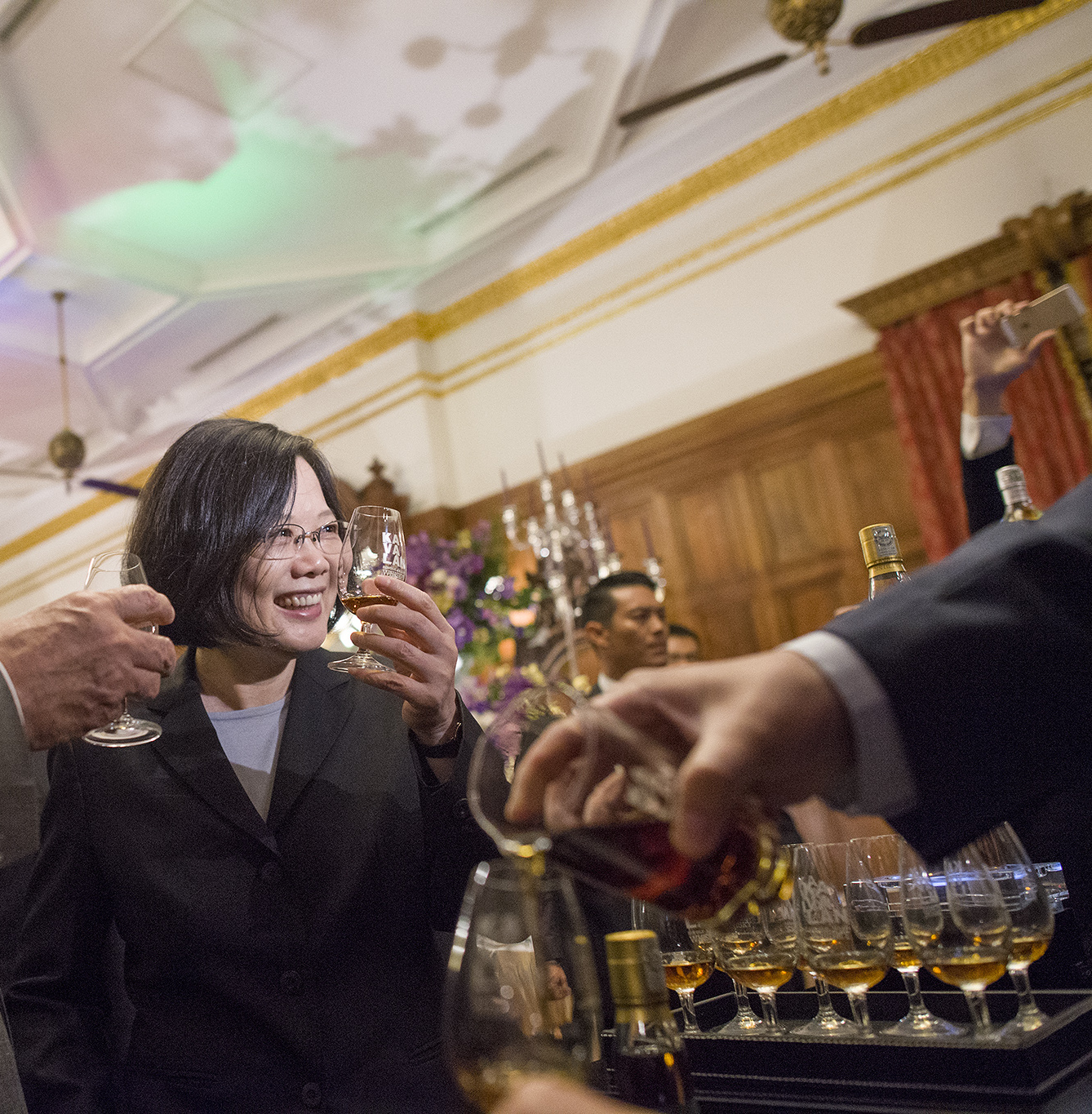
Tsai Ing-wen drinking Taiwanese whisky at a National Day drinks reception, 2016

Taiwanese whisky is whisky made in Taiwan. The most prominent Taiwanese whisky producer is the Kavalan Distillery. In 2015, the Kavalan Solist Vinho Barrique was named the best single malt whisky in the world at the World Whiskies Awards. In 2025, the Kavalan Solist Fino Sherry Single Cask won the Whisky of the Year award at the International Whisky Competition. A significant whisky market, Taiwan is the fourth largest Scotch whisky market by value ($16 USD per capita), according to the Scotch Whisky Association. Additionally, unlike most international markets where blended whisky dominates, Taiwan's whisky landscape sees single malts as the leading category.

== History ==
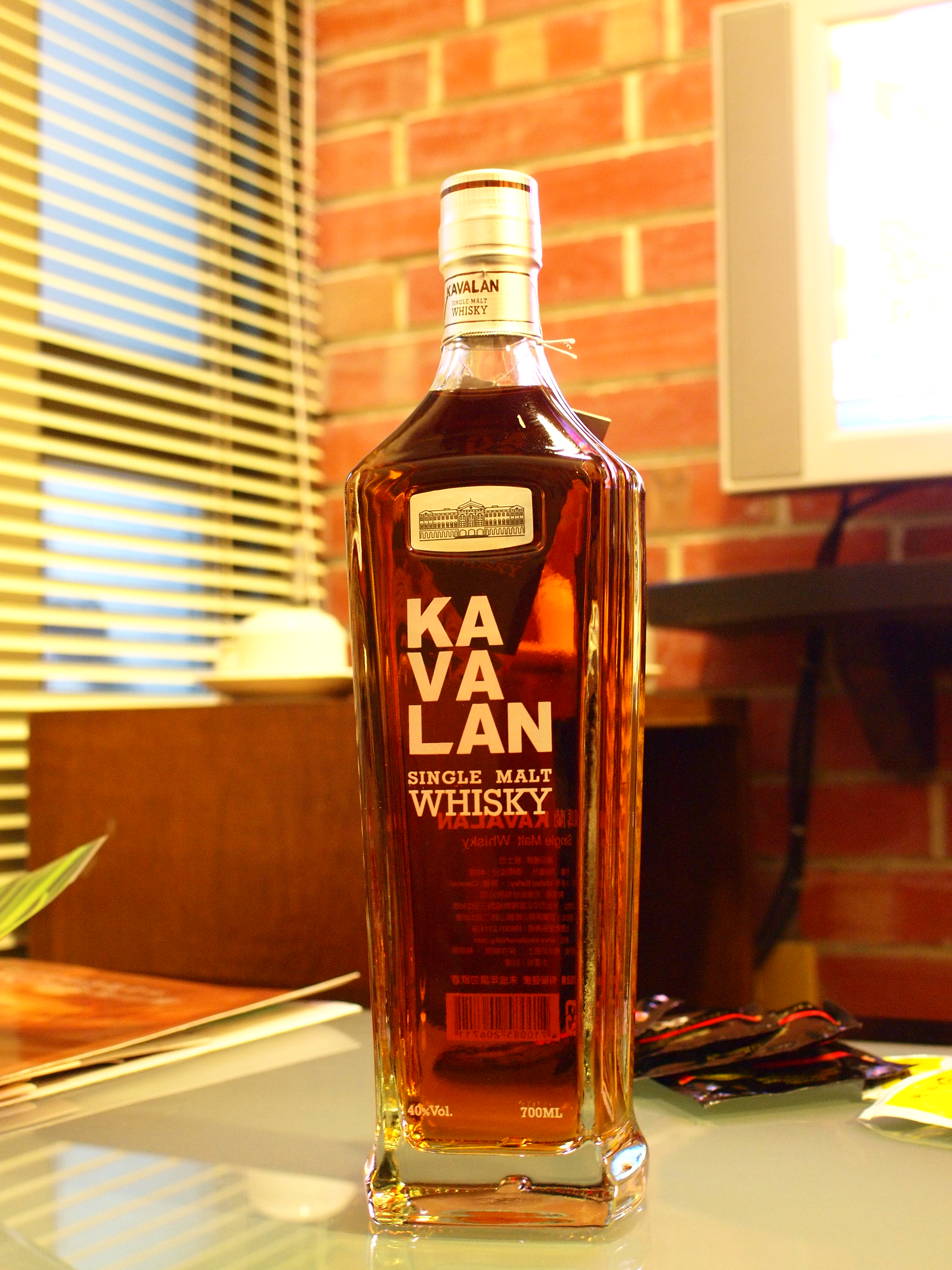
Kavalan single malt whiskey

From the Japanese colonial period until 2002 the right to produce alcohol was a government monopoly held by the Taiwan Tobacco and Liquor Corporation (TTL). Following Taiwan's membership to the World Trade Organization in 2002, private companies other than TTL were allowed to produce alcoholic beverages. In 2005, FMCG conglomerate King Car Group founded Taiwan's first dedicated whisky distillery, Kavalan Distillery. In 2008, TTL established its own whisky brand, Omar, and released their first single malt whisky in 2013. In 2010, TTL also began producing single grain whisky at its Taichung Distillery facilities.

Taiwanese whisky first gained prominence in 2010 when a Taiwanese whisky beat three Scotches and an English whisky at Scotland's Burns Night. In 2015, the Kavalan Solist Vinho Barrique was named the best single malt whisky in the world at the World Whiskies Awards.

Smaller craft whisky distilleries began emerging in the 2010s. In 2014, a Taiwanese contract manufacturer for distilled spirits established its own spirits brand, Bunnyville. In 2016, the multi-functional Holy Distillery was built in New Taipei City. In 2022, Maoweiki Distillery was established in Taoyuang. In 2024, ChiShang Distillery, located in Taitung, began constructions.

== Style & Characteristics ==
The Taiwanese government regulates alcoholic beverages broadly under the "Enforcement Rules of the Tobacco and Alcohol Administration Act", which defines Taiwanese whisky as "a distilled spirit produced from grain through malting, fermentation, and distillation, aged in wooden casks for a minimum of two years, with an alcohol content of no less than 40 percent."

In practice, the most prominent Taiwanese single malt whisky producers voluntarily hold themselves to the Scotch Whisky Association's whisky production regulations, adhering strictly to principles such as distilling entirely on-site and excluding the use of imported bulk spirits. In recent years, some distilleries have begun experimenting with specialty casks, such as lychee barrels, plum barrels, jasmine tea barrels, and honey barrels.

Due to Taiwan's subtropical climate, whisky matures two to three times as fast as it would in Scotland or Ireland. As a result, Taiwanese whisky that are produced in four to six years can potentially have a flavor profile comparable to a 12- to 18-year-old Scotch. Taiwanese whisky often has notes of subtropical fruit and in general has a creamy character, however, there is quite a bit of variation.

== Distilleries & Brands ==
=== Kavalan Distillery (噶瑪蘭威士忌) ===
Kavalan Distillery is operated by the King Car Group, located in Yuanshan Township, Yilan County, Taiwan. Established in 2005, it is Taiwan's first whisky distillery, producing single malts exclusively, meaning all liquid in its products is derived exclusively from malted barley and produced entirely within Kavalan Distillery. The distillery takes its name from "Kavalan," the historical designation of the Yilan basin. In March 2006, the distillery produced its first new-make spirit, and in 2008, the distillery launched its first product, the Kavalan Classic.

Kavalan sources its water from the Snow Mountain Range and matures its whisky in warehouses without any air-conditioning. As a result, the natural, subtropical conditions of Yilan, characterized by high temperatures and humidity, produces a distinctly rich, fruit-forward flavor profile. The distillery is also known for pioneering the STR (shaving, toasting, and recharring) technique as part of its barrel preparation process, developed in collaboration with the late Scotch whisky expert Dr. Jim Swan.

Since its founding, Kavalan has accumulated over 950 gold medals at international spirits competitions and currently exports to more than 50 markets worldwide. The distillery produces 9 million litres of liquids annually, and its maturation warehouses are estimated to hold more than 300,000 casks.

=== Nantou Distillery/Omar Whisky (南投酒廠) ===
Omar is a Taiwanese single malt whisky brand produced by the Nantou Distillery, a facility operated by the state-owned Taiwan Tobacco and Liquor Corporation (TTL). Founded in 1977, the Nantou Distillery initially focused on the production of wine, brandy, rum, and other fruit-based spirits. In 2008, a malt whisky distillation facility was established on the same premises, with the first new-make spirit produced in 2009. In 2013, Omar debuted its inaugural products: a cask strength bourbon cask single malt and a sherry cask single malt.

The brand's name is derived from the Gaelic word for amber. Omar employs a Scottish-style double distillation process using 100% imported two-row English malted barley. Given Taiwan's subtropical maturation conditions, the brand emphasizes flavor development over extended aging. A notable distinction is the Nantou Distillery's dual capacity as both a whisky distillery and a fruit winery, a combination unique among distilleries worldwide. This allows the facility to transfer freshly emptied fruit wine casks, including lychee and plum casks, directly to whisky maturation, lending Omar expressions a distinctly Taiwanese flavor character.

OMAR has received over 100 international awards and currently exports to markets including France, the United States, Japan, the United Kingdom, and Singapore, among others.

=== Taichung Distillery/Gu Yun Whisky (臺中酒廠/穀蘊威士忌) ===
Gu Yun (榖蘊) is a single grain whisky brand produced by Taichung Distillery, a facility operated by the state-owned Taiwan Tobacco and Liquor Corporation (TTL). The distillery traces its origins to 1916, when it was established during the Japanese colonial period to produce sake and rice wine. Following a relocation in 1998 to the foothills of Dadu Mountain in Taichung's industrial district, the distillery began releasing blended whisky products under the "Jade Supremacy (玉尊)" brand in 2004, using imported Scotch whisky as a base.

Grain whisky production commenced at the distillery in 2010, initially to supply Jade Supremacy's blended whisky products. Following years of experimentation and maturation at the foot of Dadu Mountain, the distillery's tasting panel selected from over one hundred casks to produce the inaugural Gu Yun Single Grain Whisky releases. Distilled from wheat using a continuous still and bottled at cask strength without chill filtration, the Gu Yun range includes expressions matured in bourbon casks, sherry casks, and new oak casks.

=== Bunnyville Distillery (龐尼維爾) ===
Bunnyville is a Taiwanese spirits brand established in 2014 by a contract distilling company that had been operating since 2005. The distillery is located in Guishan District, Taoyuan, in an area historically known as "Rabbit Hole Village." The region's name dates back to the Japanese colonial period, when the area was notable for its large wild rabbit population. The brand's identity, built around the figure of a gentleman rabbit, draws directly from this local history.

Though initially a contract manufacturer producing a variety of spirits for other labels, Bunnyville holds the distinction of being among the first generation of private distilleries licensed following Taiwan's liberalization of its liquor production regulations. The facility houses Taiwan's tallest continuous column still, standing at seven meters, alongside traditional whisky pot stills. The distillery uses spring water sourced from Guishan as its primary water source.

Bunnyville's subtropical location near the Taiwan Strait is considered conducive to accelerated oak barrel maturation, a characteristic shared by several Taiwanese whisky producers. Since its founding, the brand has accumulated over 45 medals at international spirits competitions and has developed a following particularly among local younger consumers. A dedicated whisky tasting space operates out of the brand's flagship store, located in Taipei's popular Yong Kan District.

=== Holy Distillery (合力酒廠) ===
Holy Distillery is a Taiwanese craft spirits producer founded on Christmas 2016 by Alex Chang. The distillery is located in New Taipei City's Yingge District, a area historically associated with ceramics production. The distillery's English name reflects Chang's Christian faith; its Chinese transliteration, "合力" (hé lì) means "working together." Chang, who studied civil engineering in the United States before entering the spirits industry, established the distillery with whisky as its primary focus.

Holy Distillery operates a 1,000-liter American-made hybrid copper still, and produces whisky from a range of grain bases including malted barley, Taiwanese rice, and American corn, matured across multiple oak cask types. The distillery's "Amazing Grace Single Cask Rice Whisky" was named Best Taiwanese Grain Whisky at the 2020 World Whiskies Awards. An earlier expression also received a bronze medal at the 2018 International Wine and Spirit Competition. The distillery is open to visitors and operates an on-site tasting workshop. The distillery also offers a private cask program, providing clients with single-barrel bottlings aged a minimum of five years.

=== Maoweiki Distillery (貓尾崎蒸溜所) ===
Maoweiki Distillery is a Taiwanese craft whisky producer established in 2022, located in Taoyuan, at an elevation of approximately 160 to 180 meters above sea level. The distillery's name derives from the area's historical name from the Japanese colonial period, given to the area on account of its terrain resembling the curled tail of a resting cat.

The distillery was founded by Hotel Kuva Chateau in Taoyuan, which has housed one of Taiwan's most prominent whisky retail venues since 2017. Drawing on extensive experience as a whisky advocate and retailer, Howard, the hotel and the distillery's director, established Maoweiki with the aim of producing craft single malt whisky that reflects Taiwan's distinct terroir. The distillery is situated adjacent to a tributary of the Nankan River and benefits from a temperate, humid climate well suited to whisky maturation.

Maoweiki has accumulated several international accolades within a short period of operation. Its 2023 expressions received three gold medals at the World Whiskies Awards, and its New Make 2 expression was named Best Taiwanese New Make and Young Spirit at the 2024 World Whiskies Awards. With innovation and localization as its operating objectives, the distillery is actively collaborating with Taiwanese farmers to explore the use of domestically grown barley in future productions.

=== ChiShang Distillery (池上蒸餾所) ===
ChiShang Distillery is currently under development in Chishang Township, Taitung County, a region located on Taiwan's eastern coast. A groundbreaking ceremony for the first phase of construction was held in July 2024, with first distillation projected for late 2026. At full capacity, the facility is expected to produce up to 600,000 liters of pure alcohol annually.

The distillery was co-founded by Julie Lee and Pan Jie-Chang. Lee is a prominent figure in the global whisky industry and has served as a judge at international spirits competitions across multiple countries. Pan brings over 30 years of production experience, having previously led the development of Omar Whisky and Gu Yun Whisky.

The founders selected Chishang for its clean water sources, low pollution levels, and a coastal climate influenced by Pacific Ocean winds, which they consider analogous in character to Scotland's Islay region. Pan has also expressed intent to experiment with indigenous Taiwanese oak species for cask production. The distillery has outlined an ESG-oriented operational framework, including solar energy installation, heat recovery systems, and the use of spent grain as agricultural feed.

== As a market ==
Taiwan has a developed and sophisticated whisky market. Taiwan is the third largest market for single malt whisky after the US and France. Pernod Ricard has described the Taiwanese whisky market as “discerning and advanced” and has produced special edition whiskies for the Taiwanese market.

Taiwan is the only whisky market which drinks more single malt whisky than blended whisky. The Taiwanese scotch market is so large that it has historically shaped Taiwan and the UK's relationship.

In Taiwan whisky is largely served at banquets and is often brought from home. Up until the 1990s cognac was the drink of choice at banquets but it has been replaced by whisky and to a lesser extent grape wine as tastes expand. Whisky collecting has also become popular.

== See also ==
- Outline of whisky
- Japanese whisky
- Australian whisky
- New world whisky
- Indian whisky
- Agriculture in Taiwan
- Beer in Taiwan
- Taiwanese wine
- HeySong Corporation
