= Neat Glass =

Glass for spirit tasting and judging

The Neat Glass (an acronym for Naturally Engineered Aroma Technology) is a purpose-engineered nosing vessel to expand the sensory evaluation of distilled spirits, with a specific focus on enhancing odorant detection and aroma discrimination. First introduced in 2012, it was developed following research into the relationship between glassware geometry and the release of ethanol vapors and aromatic compounds during spirit tasting. The glass was designed by George Manska to position the nose closer to the spirit while moderating ethanol vapors, making it suitable for tasting higher-strength whiskies.

== History ==
Peer-reviewed research on ethanol’s pharmacodynamic effects on olfactory perception contributed to its development, with particular attention to managing ethanol vapor concentration and airflow dynamics. Comparative analyses with traditional tasting vessels, such as Glencairn glasses or snifters, have documented differences in aroma compound dispersion and ethanol evaporation rates, though outcomes vary by spirit type and taster expertise.

== Significance ==
The glass is used primarily in professional environments, including spirits competitions, distillery quality control, and sommelier training, where standardized sensory evaluation protocols are prioritized. Independent studies note its design’s potential to reduce olfactory fatigue during prolonged nosing sessions, a common challenge in spirit assessment. Its squat shape and wide, stable base allow tasters to hold it by the bowl, using hand warmth to influence the spirit, or by the neck to avoid this effect. Patents and publications detail its focus on orthonasal delivery mechanisms and controlled vapor release, with no claims of universal superiority over other glassware.
