= Coffee in Taiwan =

Taiwan is both a coffee producing and coffee consuming country, however imports far outweigh domestic production.

== Production ==
The first coffee plants on Taiwan were imported by the British to Tainan in 1884 with the first significant small scale cultivation taking place in New Taipei City's Sanxia District. Tainan remains the heart of Taiwanese coffee culture.

Commercial coffee production in Taiwan began during the Japanese colonial period. The Japanese developed the industry to feed the export market. Production reached a peak in 1941 following the introduction of arabica coffee plants. Production declined shortly thereafter as a result of World War II. Domestic production is small—at 856 tons in 2023—but of high quality. Imported beans account for the vast majority of coffee sold in Taiwan.

The coffee borer beetle is a significant pest in Taiwan.

Tainung No. 1 is the first popular domestically bred coffee cultivar. It can be grown at lower altitudes than most coffee varieties and produces excellent quality beans. Tainung No. 1 was released in 2025.

== Consumption ==
During the Japanese colonial period between 1895 and 1945, Coffee, like other colonial introductions, was regarded as a sign of modernity. It was often made using a siphon, and tended to be strong and bitter. Production reached a peak in 1941 following the introduction of arabica coffee plants by the Japanese colonial authorities.

More recently, Starbucks' outlets in Taiwan have introduced local drinkers to espresso-based milk beverages, which are often milder than the brews traditionally served there. Domestic production is still small, but of high quality; imported beans account for the vast majority of coffee sold in Taiwan. In 2016, domestic production was 900 tons while 30,000 tons were imported. That year, a Taiwanese, Berg Wu, won the World Barista Championship; the victory helped bring to attention Taiwan's substantial involvement in coffee culture.

By 2020, there were more than 15,000 coffee shops in Taiwan, including Starbucks, Taiwanese coffee shop chains, convenience stores, and independent outlets. During that year, average coffee consumption surpassed average tea consumption for the first time. By 2024, a significant percentage of specialty coffee shops were roasting their own beans, and tourists had started visiting Taiwan specifically to go "cafe hopping". Taiwan had become the third-largest coffee consumer per capita in Asia, and the average Taiwanese person was drinking 177 cups of coffee per year.

== Roasters ==
The growth of coffee consumption in Taiwan has been accompanied by a rapid increase in cafés, chain stores, and specialty roasters. Traditional tea houses and beverage shops remain common, though coffee chains have become a significant part of urban commercial districts and transport hubs. International brands and domestic companies both play a major role in the market, with convenience stores also becoming important sellers of coffee beverages.

=== Starbucks ===
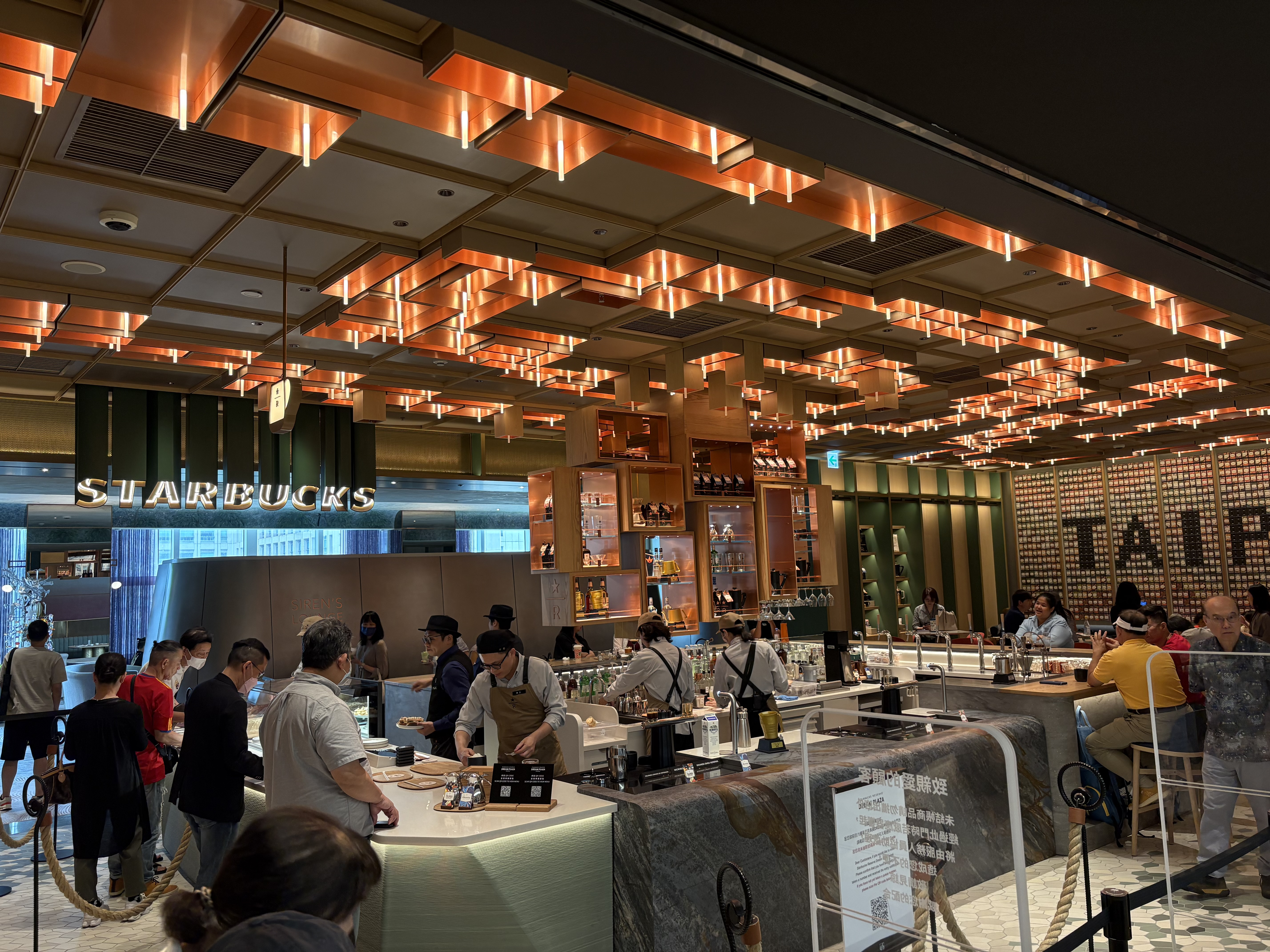
A Starbucks outlet in Taipei

Starbucks entered the Taiwanese market in 1998 through a joint venture with Uni-President Enterprises Corporation. The first store opened in Taipei, and the chain later expanded across Taiwan, including outlets in railway stations, department stores, universities, and tourist areas. Starbucks Taiwan has introduced localized products and seasonal beverages, including drinks using Taiwanese tea and fruit ingredients.

Some branches have been designed with regional themes or located in historic buildings. The chain has also promoted reusable cup campaigns and mobile ordering services in Taiwan. In addition to coffee beverages, Starbucks stores in Taiwan commonly sell pastries, desserts, and locally themed merchandise.

=== Louisa Coffee ===
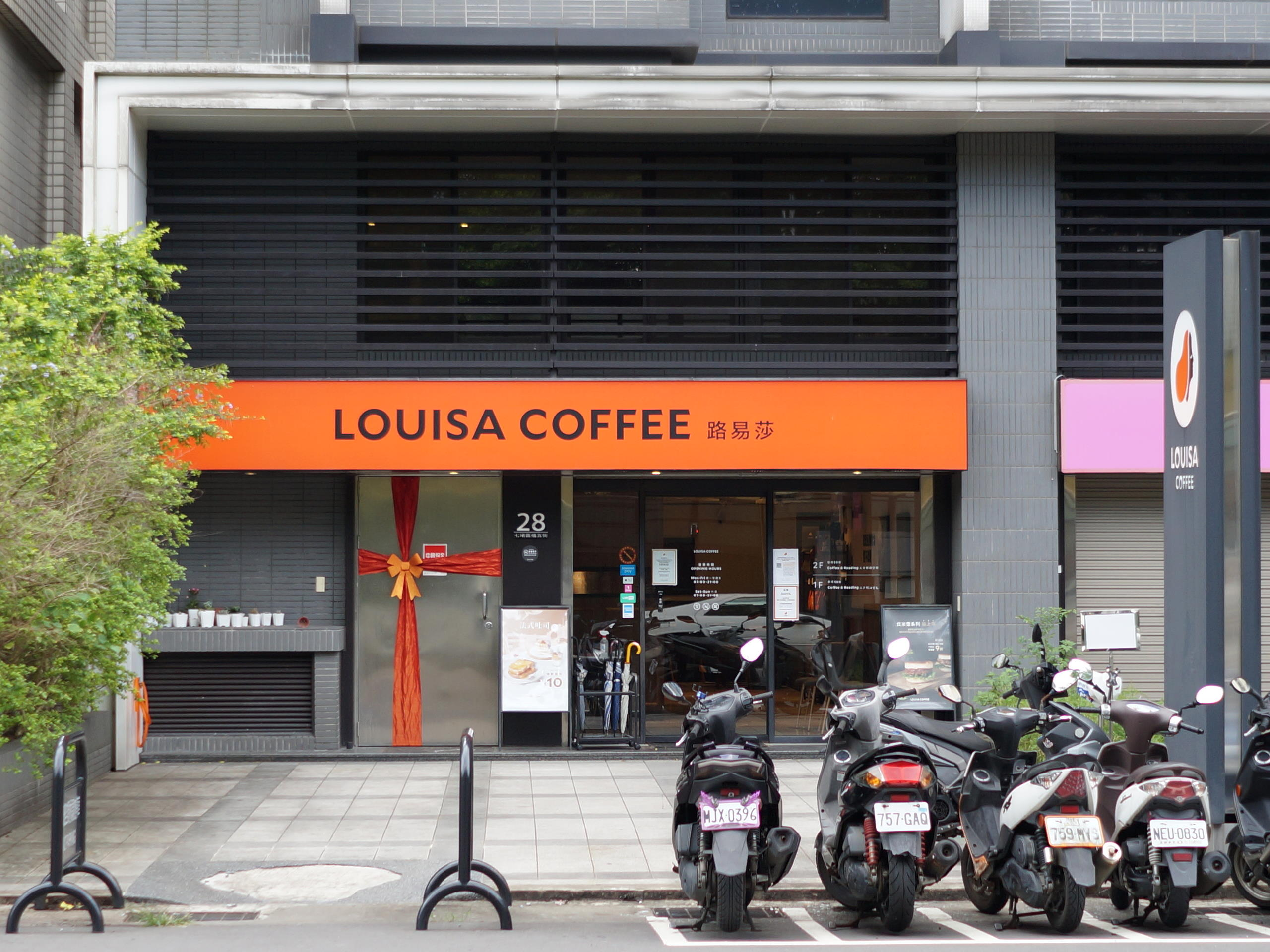
Louisa Coffee Keelung Qidu Store

Louisa Coffee is a Taiwanese coffeehouse chain founded in 2006. It expanded rapidly during the 2010s and became one of the largest domestic café chains in Taiwan by number of stores. Louisa outlets are commonly located near schools, office districts, and residential neighborhoods.

The company operates both café-style stores and smaller takeaway-oriented branches. In addition to espresso drinks, the menu includes tea beverages, light meals, and desserts. Some locations also serve alcoholic beverages and operate as hybrid café-bars.

=== CAFE!N ===
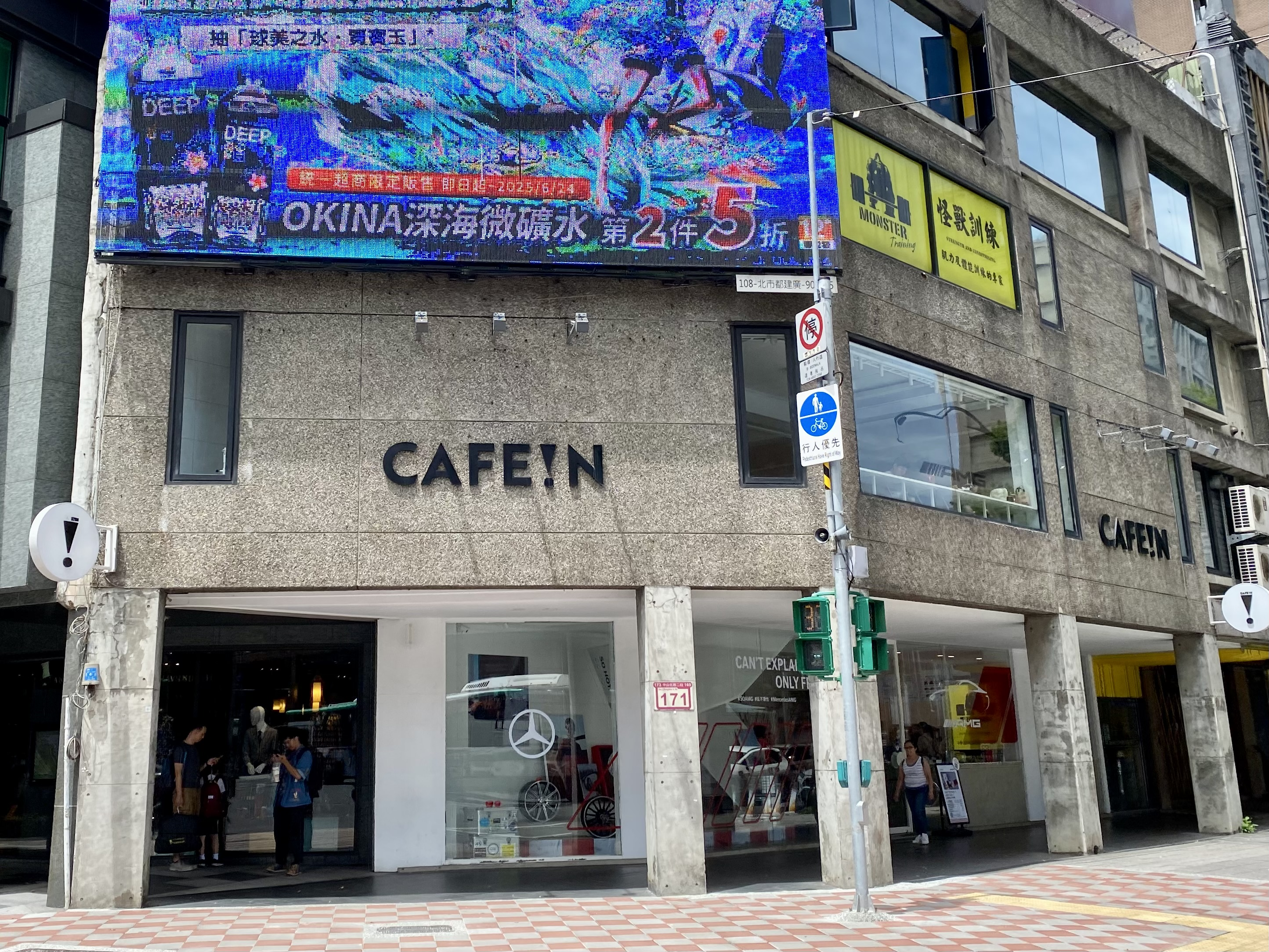
CAFE!N Taipei Minquan Store

CAFE!N is a Taiwanese coffee chain established in Taipei in 2018. The company is known for collaborations with fashion brands, artists, and entertainment franchises. Its stores are characterized by minimalist interior designs and a focus on takeaway coffee.

The chain has introduced seasonal drinks and limited-edition merchandise through partnerships with domestic and international brands. CAFE!N outlets are concentrated mainly in northern Taiwan, though the company has expanded into other cities.

=== Dante Coffee ===
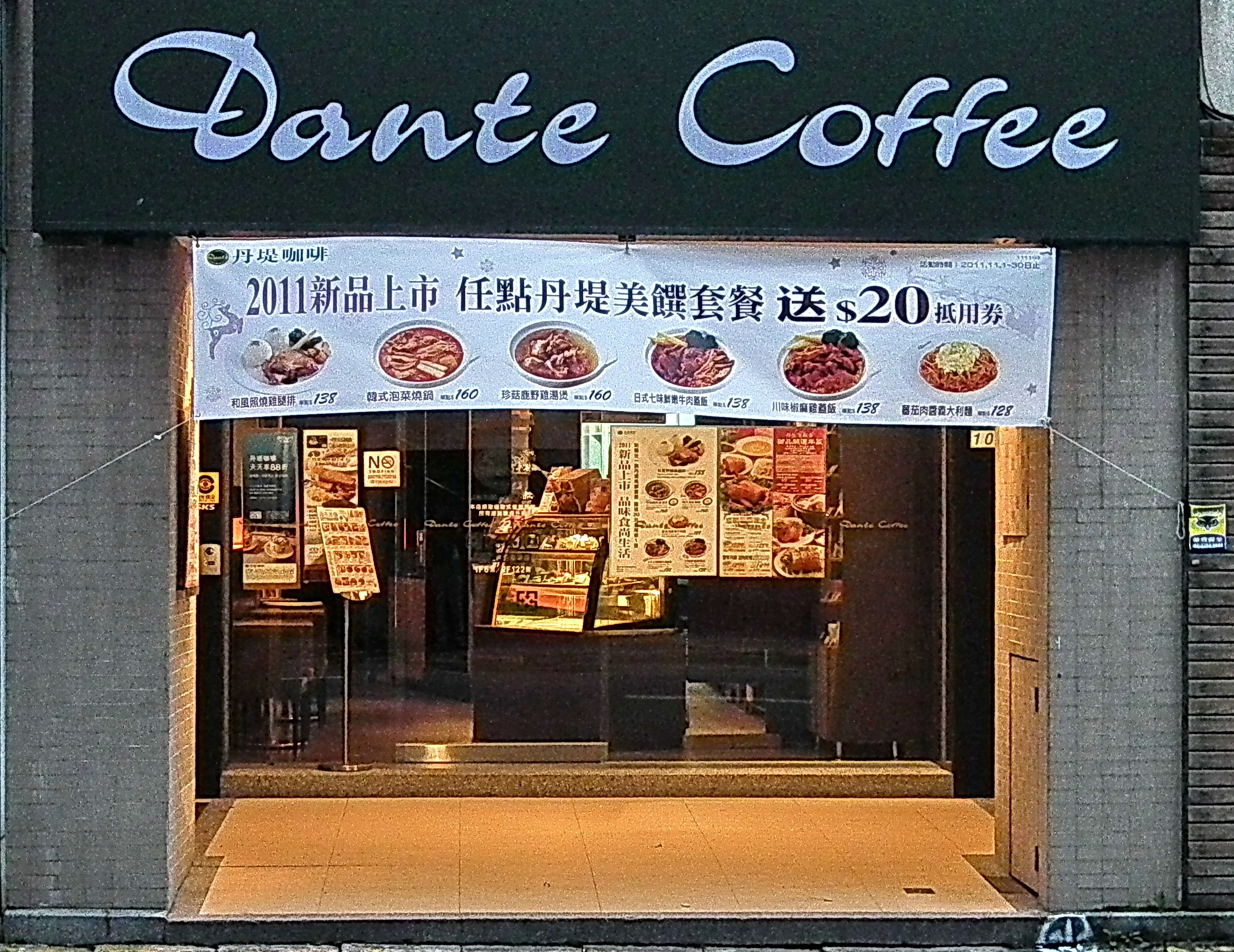
Dante Coffee Taipei Baoqing Store

Dante Coffee (丹堤咖啡) is a Taiwanese coffeehouse chain founded in 1993. It was among the earlier domestic café chains established during the expansion of coffee culture in Taiwan in the 1990s. The chain operates branches in commercial districts, hospitals, and transportation centers.

Dante Coffee offers espresso-based beverages, sandwiches, cakes, and set meals. Some branches also function as study or meeting spaces due to their extended operating hours.

=== Cama Café ===
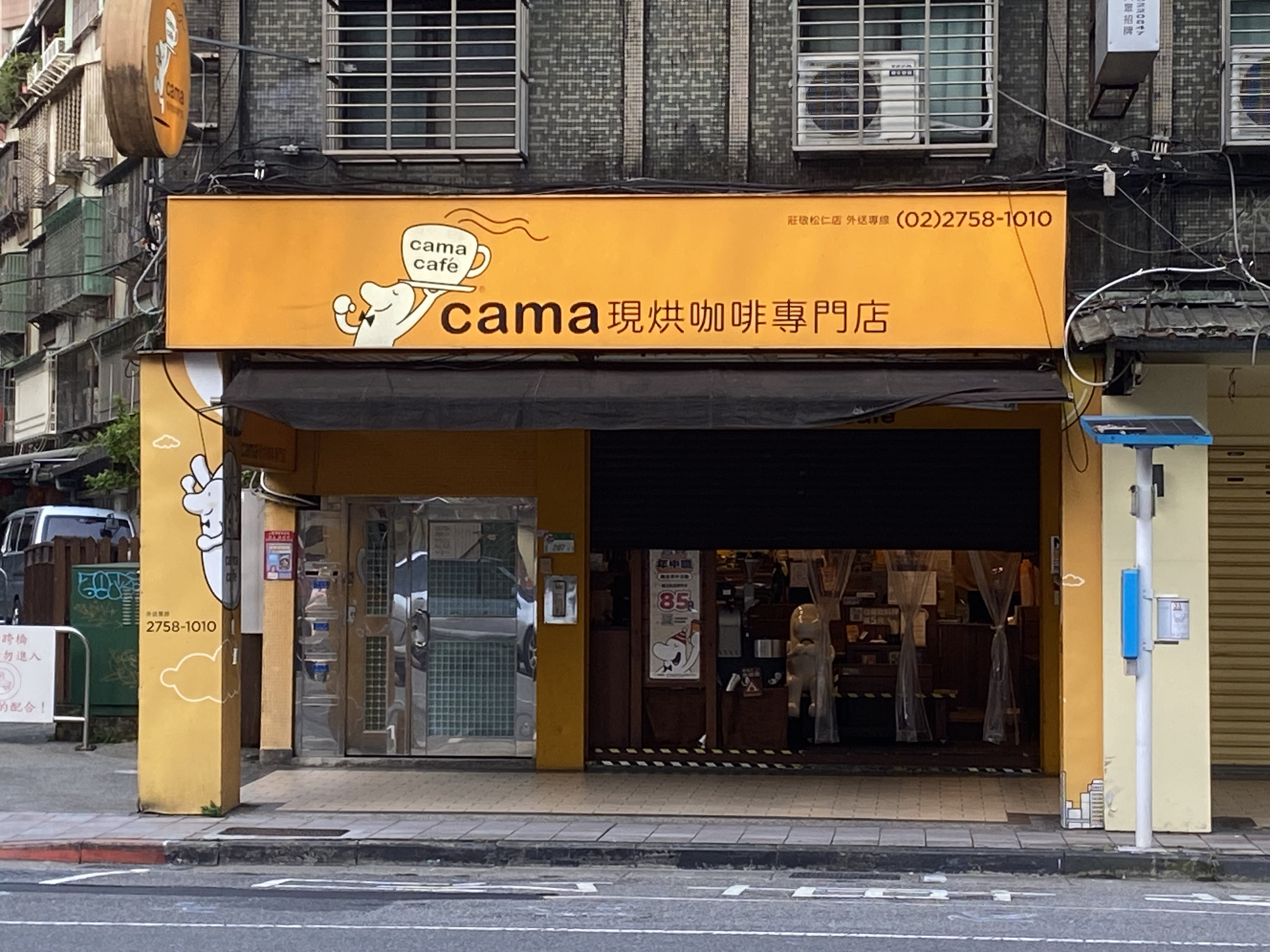
Cama Café Taipei Zhuangjing Songren Store

Cama Café is a Taiwanese coffee chain founded in 2006. The company expanded through small storefronts emphasizing freshly roasted coffee and takeaway beverages. Many branches roast coffee beans on-site or display roasting equipment inside stores.

Cama Café operates locations throughout Taiwan and has also expanded into overseas markets. The chain offers espresso drinks, single-origin coffee, and seasonal beverages.

=== Barista Coffee ===
Barista Coffee is a Taiwanese coffeehouse chain established in the 1997. The company operates cafés primarily in Taipei and other urban areas. Its stores emphasize espresso beverages and café dining, with some branches offering full meal services. Barista Coffee was among the domestic café chains that expanded during the growth of Taiwan's coffee market in the early 2000s.

=== Mr. Brown Coffee ===
Mr. Brown Coffee is a Taiwanese coffee brand established by King Car Group in 1982. The brand became known for canned coffee beverages introduced during the 1980s and later expanded into café operations. Mr. Brown cafés were among the earlier large-scale coffeehouse chains in Taiwan.

In addition to ready-to-drink canned coffee products, the company operates coffee shops serving espresso drinks, pastries, and meals. The brand has also sponsored cultural and arts-related events in Taiwan.

=== Ecoffee ===
Ecoffee is a Taiwanese café chain that operates stores in urban districts and transportation areas founded in 2002 in Taichung. The company focuses on espresso-based drinks with relatively affordable prices. Some branches are integrated into office buildings and commercial centers.

=== 85°C Bakery Cafe ===
85°C Bakery Cafe is a Taiwanese café and bakery chain established in 2004. The company combines bakery products with coffee beverages and expanded internationally during the 2000s. Its stores are known for displaying baked goods in self-service formats.

The chain's coffee products are generally positioned at lower price points than many international coffeehouse brands. In Taiwan, 85 °C outlets are commonly found in residential districts and suburban areas.

=== Convenience store coffee ===
Convenience store chains such as 7-Eleven, FamilyMart, Hi-Life, and OK Mart have become major coffee retailers in Taiwan. Freshly brewed coffee is widely sold through in-store café counters, often at lower prices than dedicated coffee shops.

7-Eleven introduced its "City Cafe" brand in 2005 despite having sold coffee since 1985, while FamilyMart operates the "Let's Café" brand. These services contributed to the growth of takeaway coffee consumption and increased the availability of coffee in smaller towns and suburban areas.

=== Ikari Coffee ===
Ikari Coffee is a Japanese coffeehouse chain that established operations in Taiwan in 1994. The company was among the earlier foreign café brands to expand into Taiwan before the rapid growth of specialty coffee chains in the 1990s and 2000s.

=== Specialty roasters ===
Taiwan has a large number of independent specialty coffee roasters and cafés. Many businesses source beans directly from producing countries and participate in international coffee competitions. Taiwanese baristas and roasters have won titles in events organized by the Specialty Coffee Association, including the World Barista Championship, World Brewers Cup, and World Latte Art Championship.

== See also ==
- Ginger tea
- Taiwanese tea
- Mr. Brown Coffee
- Coffee production in China
- Coffee in South Korea
- Coffee in Japan
