= Kavalan Distillery =

Taiwanese whisky distillery Yuanshan Township, Yilan County, Taiwan

Coordinates: 24.7137°N 121.6919°E

Kavalan Distillery 金車噶瑪蘭酒廠
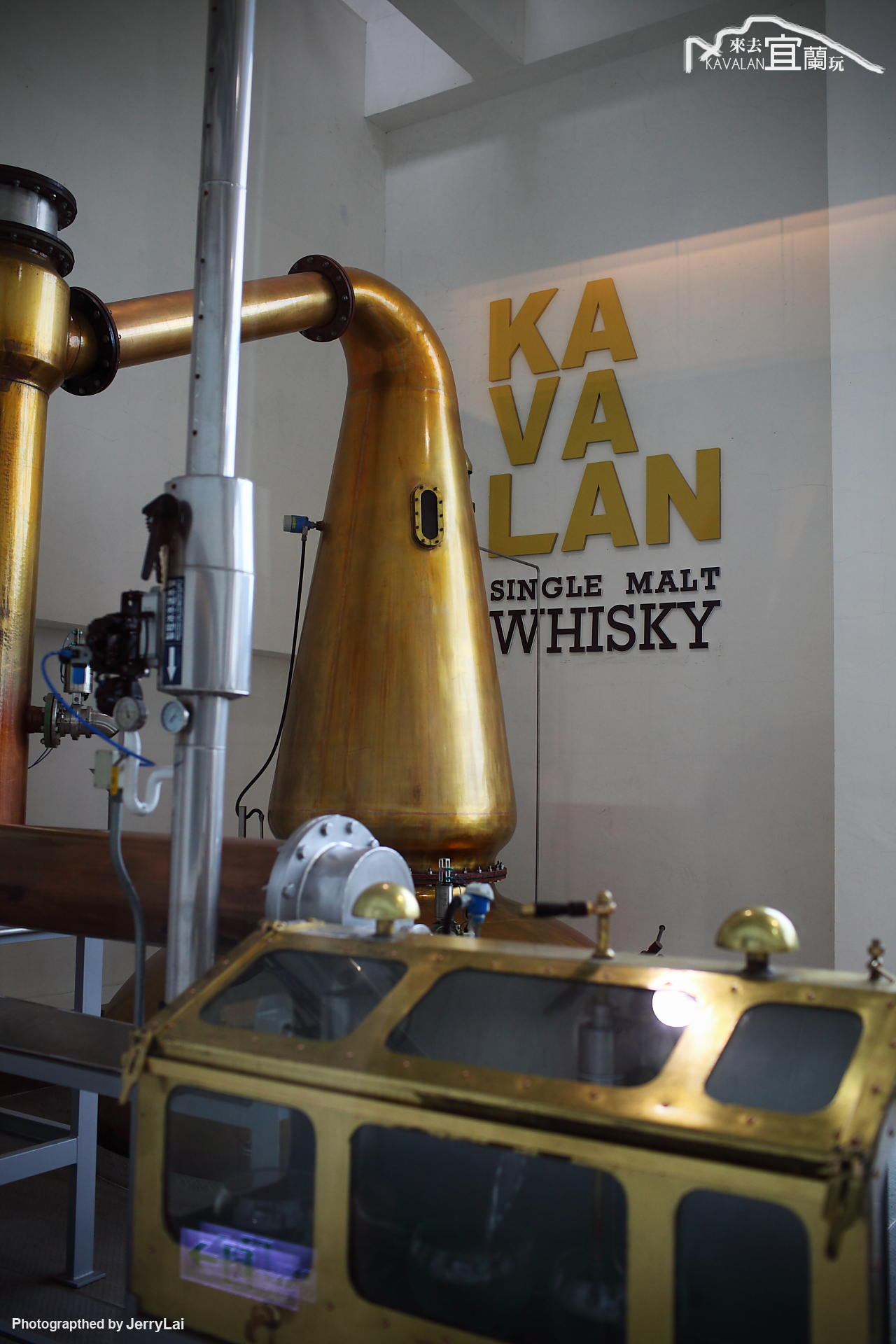
- Location: No. 326, Sec. 2, Yuanshan Road, Yuanshan, Yilan County, Taiwan
- Owner: King Car Group
- Founded: 2005; 21 years ago
- Founder: Lee Tien-Tsai
- Status: Active
- Water source: Snow Mountain
- No. of stills: 10 sets (20 stills in total)
- Capacity: 10,000,000+ bottles per year; 300,000+ barrels in storage
- Website: Kavalan Whisky

Kavalan Whisky
- Type: single malt whisky, gin, ready-to-drink (RTD) cocktails
- Age(s): Primarily no age statements (NAS); 15 & 16 years old
- ABV: 40-46% ABV & cask strength
- Characteristics: tropical fruitiness

Kavalan Distillery (Chinese: 噶瑪蘭酒廠; pinyin: Gámǎlán jiǔchǎng) is a Taiwanese whisky distillery that produces single malt whisky, gin, and ready-to-drink (RTD) cocktails. It is owned by the King Car Group and is located at Yuanshan Township, Yilan County, Taiwan. Founded in 2005, it is the first whisky distillery in Taiwan, with its first drop of spirit produced in March 2006 and its first product released in December 2008. In the years since, Kavalan Distillery has accumulated over 950 gold medals in international spirits competitions and expanded its distribution to more than 50 markets globally.

== History ==
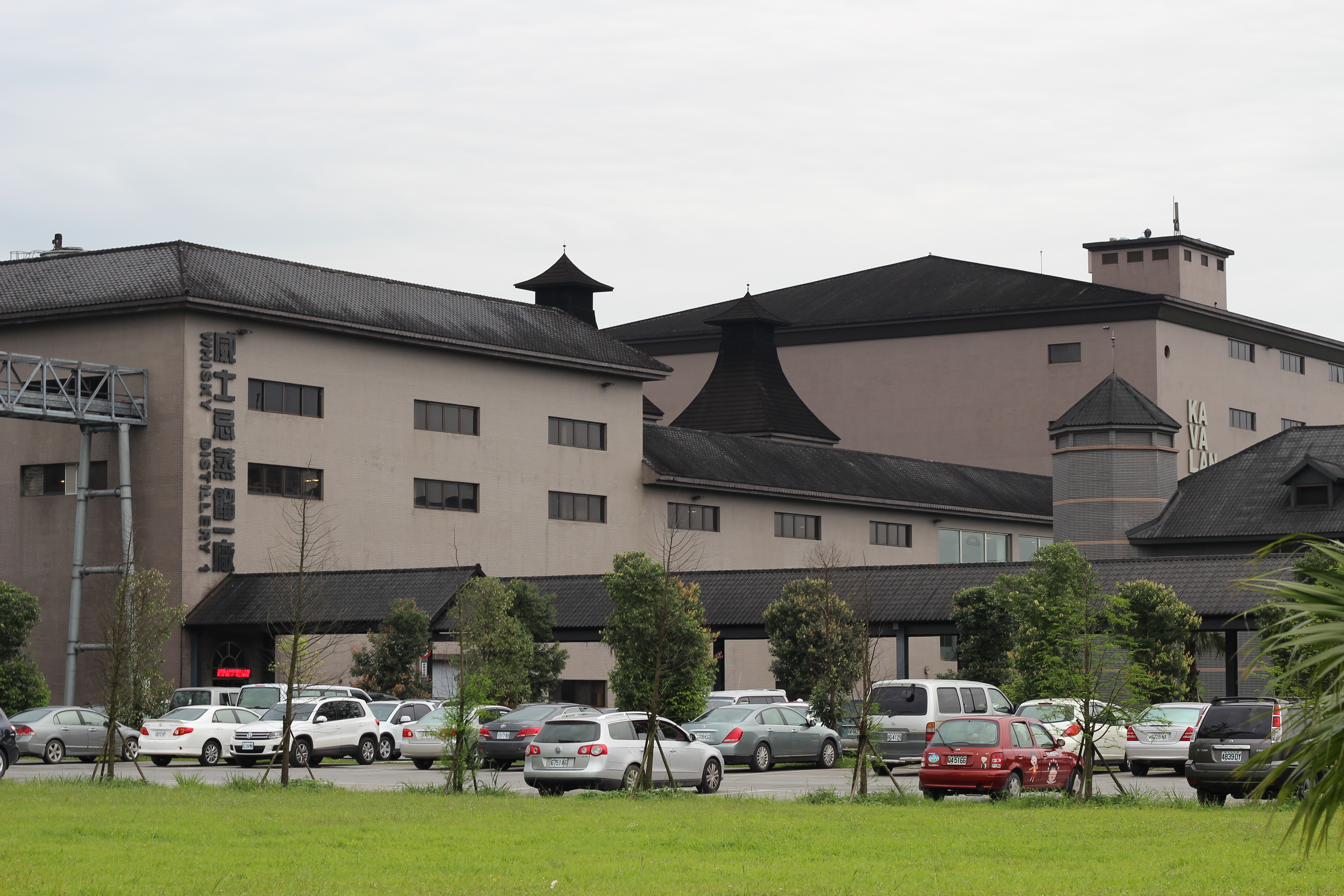
Whisky Distillery 1, King Car Kavalan Distillery

The distillery is named after the old name of Yilan County. The distillery was completed in December 2005, produced its first spirit on March 11, 2006, and released its first bottling, the Kavalan Classic, on December 4, 2008. On the same day, the distillery opened to public visitors and remains a prominent tourist attraction to this day.

In January 2010, one of the distillery's products caused a stir by beating three Scotch whiskies and one English whisky in a blind tasting organised in Leith, Scotland, to celebrate Burns Night.

The distillery was named by Whisky Magazine as the Icons of Whisky "Whisky Visitor Attraction of the Year" for 2011, and its products have won several other awards.

In 2012, Kavalan's Solist Fino Sherry Cask malt whisky was named "new whisky of the year" by Jim Murray in his guide, Jim Murray’s Whisky Bible.

In 2015, Kavalan's Solist Vinho Barrique expression was named the "World's Best Single Malt Whisky" by World Whiskies Awards.

In 2016, the Kavalan opens a second distillery facility onsite, expanding its pot stills to a total of 10 sets. A second maturation warehouse was also built in the same year.

After its first decade, Kavalan implemented German continuous stills to expand production into the gin category. The German stills are still used to this day to produce the Kavalan Gin, which debuted on the market in late 2018.

In 2019, the distillery opens the Kavalan Whisky Bar in Taipei and offers a "cask to glass" experience where guests can taste whisky straight from whisky casks.

In 2024, the distillery completed construction of its third maturation warehouse, increasing maturation storage capacity to 300,000+ casks. The same year, a Warehouse Tasting Room also opened to distillery visitors.

In 2025, Kavalan's Solist Fino Sherry Cask was named "Whisky of the Year" and the distillery was also named "Distillery of the Year" at the International Whisky Competition. The same year, the distillery introduced its first age-statement whisky, the Kavalan 15 Years Old (2025 Edition). Following the release, the distillery also debuted its dedicated peated whisky range, the Peatist Series.

== Recognition & Awards ==
The distillery has been recognized as one of the highest rated spirits during the 2015 World Whiskies Awards (WWA), with the Solist Vinho Barrique winning the "World's Best Single Malt" and "Best Asian Single Malt" titles.

In 2016, Kavalan's Solist Amontillado Sherry Single Cask Strength was named the "World's Best Single Cask Single Malt Whisky" in the same competition.

In 2017, Kavalan Distillery was awarded "Distiller of the Year" by the International Wine & Spirit Competition (IWSC).

In 2018, Kavalan Distillery's founder Tien-Tsai Lee and Chairman Yu-Ting Lee were inducted into the World Whiskies Awards' Hall of Fame.

In 2021, the distillery excelled in the Gold Outstanding category at the International Wines & Spirits Competition (IWSC), winning all but one of the eight medals that were awarded. A Forbes article at that time commented on the distillery's success: It "came to prominence in January 2012, when one of its expressions beat out three Scotch whisky expressions in a blind tasting [and has since won] dozens of awards for its whisky bottlings".

In June 2023, the company was awarded the prize for “Distillery of the Year” in the annual International Whisky Competition. Its Kavalan Solist Port Single Cask Strength Single Malt Whisky came in second in the “Top 15 Whiskies of 2023” category, and its Kavalan Triple Sherry Cask Single Malt Whisky ranked fourth out of the 92 “Whiskies Scoring Over 90 Points” in the competition.

In 2024, Kavalan was named "Worldwide Whisky Producer of the Year" by the International Spirits Challenge. The same year, Kavalan's Distillery Reserve Peated Whisky won "Best Single Malt Whisky" and "Best Asian Whisky" at the Tokyo Whisky and Spirits Competition (TWSC).

In the 2025 International Whisky Competition, Kavalan was awarded "Distillery of the Year", with Head of R&D Zerose Yang winning "Master Distiller of the Year" and the Solist Fino Sherry Cask winning "Whisky of the Year". At the same time, the Solist Fino Sherry Cask was also named "Whisky of the Year" at the International Wine & Spirit Competition (IWSC).

By the end of 2025, Kavalan Distillery has amassed over 950 gold medals from global whisky competitions.

== Whisky Production ==
Kavalan Distillery produces single malt whisky, meaning all liquid in its products is derived exclusively from malted barley and produced entirely within Kavalan Distillery. The distillery proceeds through mashing, fermentation, distillation, and maturation before bottling. Notably, Kavalan does not conduct malting on-site; barley malt is sourced externally, and the production process begins upon its arrival at the distillery.

=== Whisky Production Process ===
1. Milling: Malted barley is fed through a mill, where it is ground into a coarse flour known as grist. The composition of the grist — the ratio of husks, grits, and flour — is controlled to optimize sugar extraction in the subsequent mashing stage.
2. Mashing: The grist is combined with hot water in one of the distillery's five mash tuns. This process converts the starches present in the malted barley into fermentable sugars, producing a sugar-rich liquid known as wort.
3. Fermentation: The wort is transferred into one of Kavalan's 40 washbacks, where yeast is added to initiate fermentation. Over the course of several days, the yeast converts the sugars in the wort into alcohol, producing a low-strength liquid known as wash.
4. Distillation: Kavalan employs pot still distillation, using 10 sets of Scottish pot stills — 20 stills in total. The wash is distilled twice: first in a wash still, which produces a spirit of intermediate strength known as low wines, and subsequently in a spirit still, which refines the liquid to a higher alcohol concentration. During the second distillation, the new-make spirit is separated into the desirable middle cut — known as the heart — from the less desirable foreshots and feints at either end of the run. Kavalan Distillery's annual production volume exceeds 10 million bottles.
5. Maturation: The new-make spirit is filled into oak barrels and transferred to one of Kavalan's three maturation warehouses, which have a combined storage capacity of over 300,000 barrels. Kavalan uses a variety of cask types, including ex-bourbon, ex-sherry, ex-port, and ex-wine barrels, as well as casks treated using its proprietary S.T.R. process. Lower floors in the maturation warehouses house the distillery's smaller barrels and utilize a palletized storage system, with barrels standing upright and bundled in fours as a security measure in case of earthquakes. The upper floors are home to Kavalan's larger barrels and utilize a dunnage-style storage system, where casks are laid on their sides and stacked vertically.
6. Bottling: Whisky is bottled onsite. Kavalan does not use artificial coloring as of March 2016, and does not chill filter expressions bottled above 46% ABV.

=== S.T.R. Barrel Treatment ===
Kavalan's S.T.R. (Shaving, Toasting, and Re-charring) process is a cask preparation technique, in which used wine barrels are rejuvenated through a three-stage treatment before being used for whisky maturation.

The S.T.R. method consists of three sequential steps applied to previously used casks, typically former wine barrels:

1. Shaving refers to the mechanical removal of the innermost layer of wood from the cask interior. This exposes fresh wood beneath the surface, which has been stained and saturated by prior wine content.
2. Toasting involves the application of controlled heat to the newly exposed wood surface. This process caramelizes the wood's natural sugars and activates flavor compounds — including vanillin and lactones — that will subsequently be imparted to the maturing spirit.
3. Re-charring is the final stage, in which the interior of the cask is briefly set alight, creating a layer of charcoal, contributing additional flavor characteristics such as smokiness and spice.

Not all Kavalan products undergo the S.T.R. process. The treatment is applied selectively to specific expressions, most notably the Solist Vinho Barrique, as well as the Master's Select No. 1 and No. 2, and the LÁN expression.

== Terroir & Climate ==
Kavalan Distillery is situated in Yilan County on the northeastern coast of Taiwan, a region bounded by the Central Mountain Range to the west and the Pacific Ocean to the east. The distillery sources water from the headwaters of Snow Mountain, a source noted for its purity and consistency.

Yilan's subtropical climate, characterized by high ambient temperatures and significant humidity, plays a defining role in the character of Kavalan whisky, especially since Kavalan's maturation warehouses are without any climate controls or air conditioning. Expressions across the range are broadly characterized by pronounced tropical fruit notes (commonly pineapple, mango, and papaya) alongside vanilla, honey, and dried fruit characteristics derived from the intensive wood interaction during maturation. This profile distinguishes Kavalan from single malts produced in cooler, slower-maturing climates, and has been a defining factor in the brand's reception in international competition.

== Kavalan Distillery Visitor Experiences ==
Kavalan Distillery is open to public visitors year-round. The visitor experience encompasses guided distillery tours, whisky tasting opportunities, and a range of interactive experiences across the distillery's 40-hectare grounds. The distillery is open daily, including public holidays, from 9:00 AM to 6:00 PM. In 2026, the distillery implemented a ticketing system with an entry fee of $200 per person.

=== Spirit Castle (Visitor Center) ===
The Spirit Castle serves as the distillery's central visitor hub, housing retail, dining, tasting and exhibition spaces that orient guests to Kavalan's history, production process, and product range. The Distillery Shop is located on the 1st floor here. On the second floor, Mr. Brown Cafe serves coffee, tea, soft drinks, and freshly-made meal options.

=== Warehouse Tasting Room ===
Opened in 2024 alongside the distillery's third maturation warehouse, the Warehouse Tasting Room offers visitors the opportunity to taste whisky directly from casks within an immersive maturation environment. Five rare casks are available for tasting, including two distillery-exclusive expressions — a Colheita Port cask and a Virgin Oak cask — alongside a Peaty Bourbon cask, an Amontillado Sherry cask, and a Vinho Barrique cask.

=== Whisky Lab (DIY Blending Workshops) ===
The Whisky Lab offers a hands-on blending experience in which visitors are guided through the process of combining different Kavalan whiskies to create a 300ml personalized blend. This experience is designed to introduce participants to the principles of whisky blending in an interactive format.

=== Garden Hall Bar ===
The Garden Hall Bar serves Kavalan-based cocktails alongside Buckskin Beer, a craft beer brand also produced under the King Car Group portfolio.

=== Garden Hall Tasting Room ===
The Garden Hall Tasting Room offers the complete range of Kavalan's core products, available both à la carte and in curated tasting flights. Overseas-exclusive and channel-exclusive expressions are not available at this venue.

== Whisky Products ==
Kavalan single malt whisky is currently sold in 47 variants. Kavalan's whiskies are known for their signature tropical fruit notes; common flavor notes include mango, pineapple, coconut.

=== Kavalan Core Series (40-46% ABV) ===
- Kavalan Classic Single Malt Whisky
- Kavalan Distillery Select No.1 Single Malt Whisky
- Kavalan Distillery Select No. 2 Single Malt Whisky
- Kavalan Concertmaster Port Cask Finish Single Malt Whisky
- Kavalan Concertmaster Sherry Cask Finish Single Malt Whisky
- Kavalan Concertmaster Vinho Barrique Finish Single Malt Whisky
- Kavalan ex-Bourbon Oak Single Malt Whisky
- Kavalan Sherry Oak Single Malt Whisky
- Kavalan Wine Oak Single Malt Whisky
- Kavalan Port Oak Single Malt Whisky
- Kavalan Triple Sherry Cask Single Malt Whisky
- Kavalan LÁN Single Malt Whisky (exclusive to export markets)

=== Solist Series (Single Cask Strength; 50-59.9% ABV) ===
- Kavalan Solist ex-Bourbon Single Cask Strength Single Malt Whisky
- Kavalan Solist Oloroso Sherry Single Cask Strength Single Malt Whisky
- Kavalan Solist Fino Sherry Single Cask Strength Single Malt Whisky
- Kavalan Solist Amontillado Sherry Single Cask Strength Single Malt Whisky (Rare Sherry Collection)
- Kavalan Solist Manzanilla Sherry Single Cask Strength Single Malt Whisky (Rare Sherry Collection)
- Kavalan Solist PX Sherry Single Cask Strength Single Malt Whisky (Rare Sherry Collection)
- Kavalan Solist Moscatel Sherry Single Cask Single Malt Whisky (Rare Sherry Collection)
- Kavalan Solist Palo Cortado Sherry Single Cask Single Malt Whisky (Rare Sherry Collection)
- Kavalan Solist Port Single Cask Strength Single Malt Whisky
- Kavalan Solist Vinho Barrique Single Cask Strength Single Malt Whisky
- Kavalan Solist Brandy Single Cask Strength Single Malt Whisky
- Kavalan Solist Rum Single Cask Strength Single Malt Whisky
- Kavalan Solist Madeira Single Cask Strength Single Malt Whisky
- Kavalan Solist Peated Single Cask Strength Single Malt Whisky
- Kavalan Solist Virgin Oak Single Cask Strength Single Malt Whisky

=== Kavalan Reverence Series ===
- King Car Conductor Single Malt Whisky
- Kavalan Podium Single Malt Whisky
- Kavalan 15th Anniversary ex-Bourbon Single Cask Strength Single Malt Whisky (limited edition)
- Kavalan 15th Anniversary Oloroso Sherry Single Cask Strength Single Malt Whisky (limited edition)
- Kavalan Aged 16 Years Virgin Oak Single Cask Strength Single Malt Whisky (limited edition)
- Kavalan Aged 16 Years ex-Bourbon Single Cask Strength Single Malt Whisky (limited edition)

=== Distillery Reserve Series (Exclusive to Kavalan Distillery Shop) ===
- Kavalan Distillery Reserve Peated Whisky Single Cask Strength Single Malt Whisky
- Kavalan Distillery Reserve Rum Cask Single Cask Strength Single Malt Whisky
- Kavalan Distillery Reserve Madeira Cask Single Cask Strength Single Malt Whisky

=== Peatist Series ===
- Kavalan Peatist ex-Bourbon Single Cask Strength Single Malt Whisky
- Kavalan Peatist Oloroso Sherry Single Cask Strength Single Malt Whisky

=== Channel-Limited ===
- Kavalan Master's Select No.1 Single Malt Whisky (travel retail exclusive)
- Kavalan Master's Select No.2 Single Malt Whisky (travel retail exclusive)
- Kavalan Grand Reserve No.1 Single Malt Whisky (Lotte exclusive)
- Kavalan Grand Reserve No.2 Single Malt Whisky (Lotte exclusive)
- Kavalan Rhythm of Taiwan Collection -- Ocean Single Malt Whisky (EVERRICH exclusive)
- Kavalan Distiller's Reserve No.1 Single Malt Whisky (Jeju Tourism Organization exclusive)
- Kavalan Distiller's Reserve No.2 Single Malt Whisky (Jeju Tourism Organization exclusive)
- Kavalan Blender's Select Single Malt Whisky (Costco exclusive)
- Kavalan Blender's Select Signature Single Malt Whisky (Costco exclusive)
- Kavalan Blender's Select Signature Sweet & Mellow Single Malt Whisky (Costco exclusive)
- Kavalan Blender's Reserve No.1
- Kavalan Blender's Reserve No.2

== Gin Products ==
In 2018, Kavalan introduced a gin. Kavalan Gin sets itself apart from other gin offering by using Taiwanese herbs, spices, and botanicals like kumquat, red guava, and dried star fruit. The gin is produced using the set of German stills Kavalan bought in its early days.

== Ready-To-Drink (RTD) Cocktail Products ==
In the 2020s, Kavalan Distillery expanded its presence from premium single malts into the Ready-to-Drink (RTD) market with a line of canned cocktails designed for convenience without sacrificing the quality of their award-winning spirits. The RTD products are available mainly in Japan, South Korea, and Hong Kong.

Kavalan's RTD cocktail lineup includes:

1. Kavalan Highball: The flagship product that uses Kavalan Classic as base.
2. Kavalan Dry Highball: The unsweetened edition of the Kavalan Highball Whisky Soda.
3. Kavalan Dry Triple Sherry Cask Whisky Highball: An unsweetened highball using the Kavalan Triple Sherry Cask Whisky as base.
4. Kavalan Dry Peated Whisky Highball: A limited-edition unsweetened highball using the Solist Peated Whisky as base, developed exclusively for Lawson.
