= Coffee in South Korea =

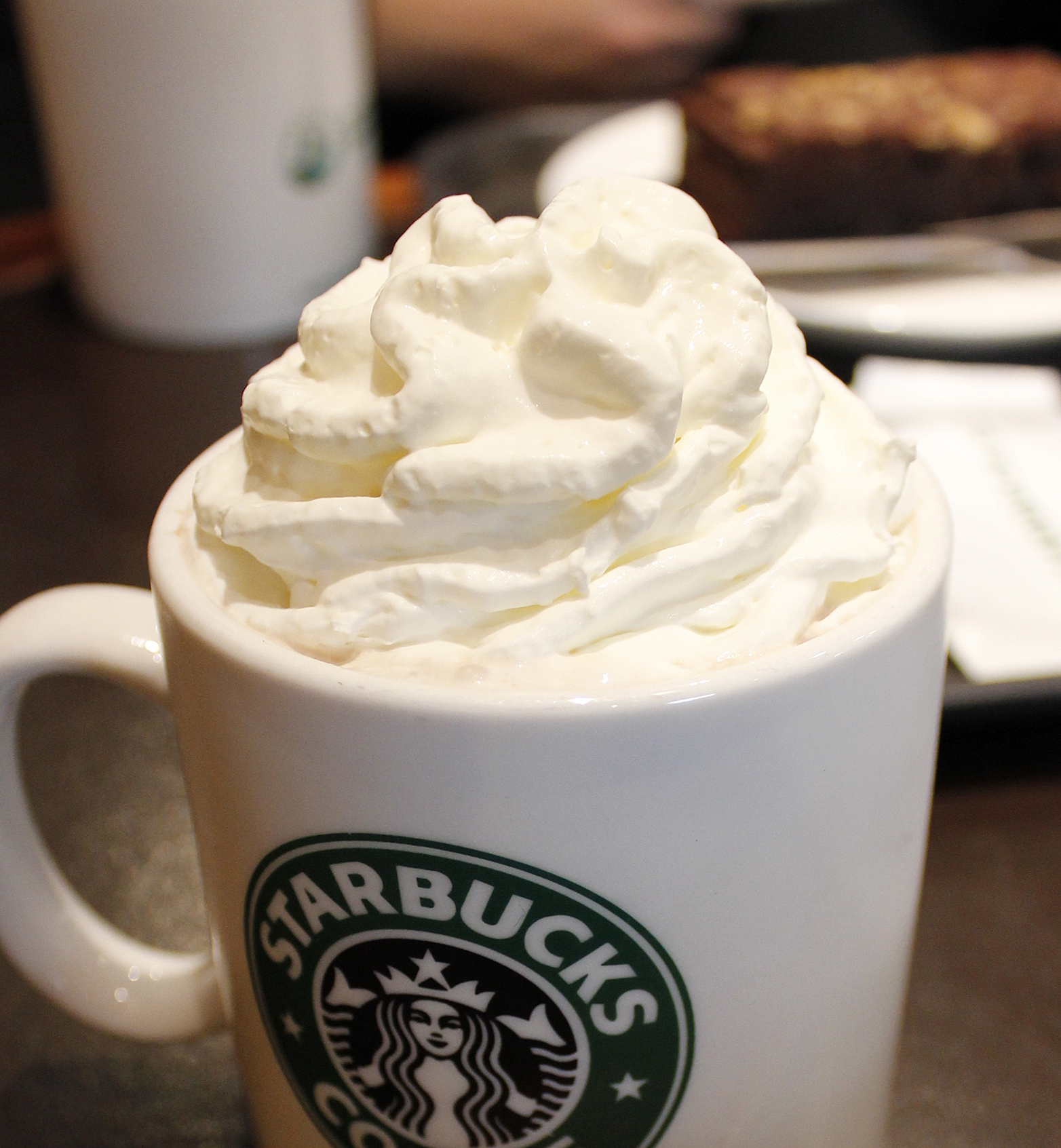
A Starbucks coffee with whipped cream in Seoul

Coffee in South Korea has been a strong element in South Korean culture. Originally introduced in the 19th century, it has become a prominent commodity in South Korean marketplaces. It is one of the most popular beverages in the area.

== History ==
According to Junman Kang's King Gojong goes to Starbucks (한국어: 고종 스타벅스에 가다), Kang states that King Gojong was the first person to taste coffee in Korea. Antoinette Sontag, the sister-in-law of a Russian ambassador, treated the king to a cup of coffee in 1896. Koreans were curious about foreign cultures and the new beverage. Because it came from the West and resembled Asian herbal medicine that only the rich could afford, it was consumed as a symbol of westernization and modernization. In the early days, people called coffee shop or café "dabang". The very first dabang in Korea was built by Sontag as named Sontag Hotel at Junggu Jeongdong in Seoul in 1902.

The modern type of dabangs dates from 1927 in Myeongdong and were spread to Jongno and Chungmuro. At first dabangs were open to the royal family and people in high positions and later were used as politicians' hall, artists' headquarters, and businessmen's meeting place. Koreans were fascinated by dabang because they enjoyed the practice of drinking coffee in dabang atmosphere; it was a great pleasure to experience using forks to have cake and drinking coffee in a teacup instead of using chopsticks and drinking Korean traditional soup out of a bowl.

In mid-1900, dabangs continued to exist as a meeting place rather than as a place where people could drink coffee; however, it was not the time for ordinary citizens to consume coffee yet due to the high price. Before the introduction of coffee shops, people in high positions often held meetings at kisaeng houses while commoners hung out at jumak to talk about their lives and politics. Since dabangs were the center of debates about politics, economy, culture, education, art, and religion by people of different professions, the Korean government strictly restricted individuals' visit to dabangs. In that sense, Korean cafés in 1950s were very similar to Parisian cafés in the late seventeenth century when the "police [had] closely watched cafés" due to the cafés' function as social institutions (Haine 1992, 608).

Coffee would remain a good consumed by the upper classes until the introduction of instant coffee in Korea during the Korean War (1950 – 1953) by the U.S. military. Instant coffee became widely available before and after the Korean War and many Koreans began to enjoy coffee and later became regular drinkers.

In the 1960s, the value of coffee skyrocketed because coffee was prohibited from dabangs due to the movement of using domestic products after dictator Park Chung Hee's 5.16 military coup d'état in 1961. However, dabangs in general became more open to middle class citizens in 1960s. Although dabangs were still for adults only, it became a popular dating place for young men and women. The first Korean theme café was probably a music dabang in the 1970s. This type of dabang had disk jockeys who received song requests from customers and played record music for them. It provided a feeling of freedom to college students who could not express their political opinions openly in 1970s.

As the competition amongst dabangs increased in the 1980s, they decorated themselves with distinctive items, such as pink lights and indoor waterfalls, to survive in the increasingly crowded marketplace. At that time, dabangs underwent huge changes in their atmosphere and menu. For example, dark dabangs with dividers to block others' views changed into the ones with bright and cozier atmospheres. This new type of coffee shop, which called themselves cafés to distinguish themselves from old style dabangs, began to focus on different kinds of coffee instead of selling traditional teas and sodas.

In the 1990s, people thought that consumption had a style and preferred cafés with a neater interior design and professionalism in coffee. There was a huge shift in Korean café culture's history in 1999 when Starbucks, the first foreign franchise coffee shop in Korea, was established in Sinchon, Seoul. Starbucks introduced Korea to a new café culture, such as take-out and self-service system without good-looking waitresses and staying at a café alone reading a book or doing homework. Since then, more foreign franchise coffee shops entered the market with a greater variety of coffee and atmosphere, and more local franchise cafés and small private-owned cafés appeared with their unique features.

== Coffee consumption ==
As of 2015, there were an estimated 49,600 coffee shops in South Korea, and 17,000 coffee shops in Seoul, making Seoul's coffee-per-capita greater than that of Seattle or San Francisco. The number of coffee shops in South Korea later surpassed 100,000, reaching 100,729 by the end of 2022 according to Statistics Korea—nearly double the combined number of outlets of the country's four largest convenience store chains. South Korea's per capita coffee consumption was estimated at 405 cups per year in 2023, and at 416 cups in 2024, the highest among Asian countries.

The instant coffee market makes up a large percentage of the total coffee consumption in Korea where many well-known brands compete for market share. Instant coffee technology like freeze-drying, which was the best method of preserving the flavor of coffee, was improved upon in Korea, where freeze-drying was stabilized for mass production. As of 2003, instant coffee made up 90 percent of all the coffee consumed.

With the introduction of big coffee chains like Starbucks, in the late 1990s, the consumption of freshly brewed coffee increased. Going to Starbucks to enjoy coffee became a way to engage with American and Western culture, hence many young and/or middle and upper-middle class Koreans began to frequent Starbucks.

=== Buddhism and coffee consumption ===
Another group of Koreans who have increased their consumption of coffee are Korean Buddhist. In Korea today some major monasteries say that over half of the meditation monks have switched to coffee. Making coffee and sharing it with visitors is also rationalized as a way for Buddhism to remain relevant in contemporary society. The type of coffee normally associated with the Korean monastic community is hand-drip coffee. That is because monks may want to be associated with Korean high-culture which is associated with hand-drip coffee. Additionally, there are many tools and steps involved with hand-drip coffee which mirror the ceremony of making tea. As an example of how the Korean Buddhist community has embraced coffee one can turn to the Puramsa, Torisa, and other monastic grounds where cafes were established.

=== Korean Culture and coffee consumption ===
The most popular coffee among Koreans is Iced Americano, regardless of weather. Even in the cold winter, Koreans like to drink Iced Americano. AFP has mentioned, in winter the consumption of Iced Americano is greater than warm drinks. For this particular coffee consumption, there's a new phrase created called 'Eoljukah' which means 'iced coffee even if I freeze to death'. The reason that particular drink is popular is because of Korea's fast paced culture. Iced Americano comes out in a short amount of time compared to the other drinks so in fast-paced culture in Korea, most people prefer that drink. In 2019, Hyundai Research Lab found out that the individuals' average yearly consumption of coffee is 353 cups, which is the rate that is twice higher than worldwide average.

== Roasters ==
The sudden influx of coffee shops have replaced the once traditional "dabang" which were common meetings places serving a selection of customary teas. In addition to large US chains that have profited from the surge in demand for coffee, local businesses and entrepreneurs have also seized the opportunities. As of 2014 South Korea boasted 17,000 coffee shops and the capital, Seoul, had more outlets of Starbucks than any other city in the world, even New York.

=== Starbucks ===
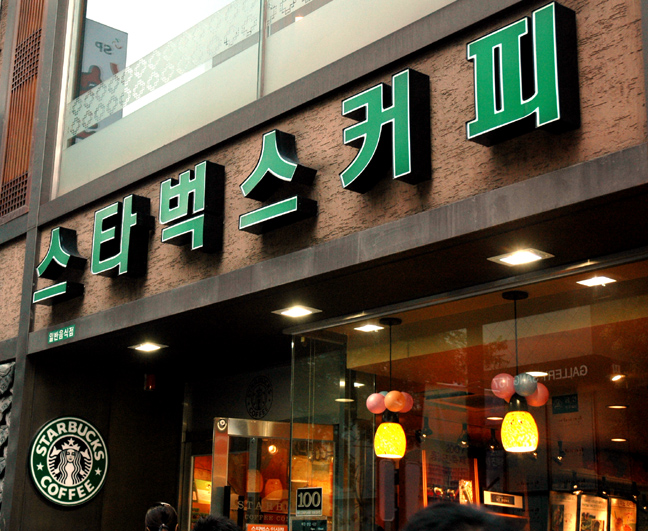
A Starbucks in Seoul

Starbucks opened its first store in 1999 and since 2011 has been opening about 80 new premises a year. The strong association with the South Korean public and the US has helped make coffee desirable and with many Koreans associating coffee and Starbucks as a lifestyle choice, it has become a status symbol throughout Seoul. Landlords are eager to have the brand open up a store in their buildings to enhance their value, reputation and image.

However, not all new Starbucks locations were welcomed warmly. In 2001, Starbucks opened a store in Insa-dong overcoming fierce resistance from the neighborhood's shop owners. The locals opposed the plane to open Starbucks because it would taint the Insa-dong's identity as the cradle of all Korean culture. Shop owners also had practical concerns as they believed that Starbucks would lure away customers who visited the traditional teahouses in the area. After numerous negotiations and compromises Starbucks opened their Insa-dong shop. This shop is unique in that it is the only Starbucks with a Korean sign board and its windows have traditional wooden lattice patterns. Inside the shop there are also several markers of traditional culture like wooden masks. However, some Koreans remain cynical of the Insa-dong shop as they view Starbuck's attempts as superficial and merely cosmetic with no real tribute to Korean culture.

Being the fourth largest market for Starbucks with 1,611 stores and almost 20,000 workers, the store is facing hardships in over working conditions. In January 2022, to draw attention, the workers drove around Seoul with the message "Partners' are your biggest asset." Through this Starbucks Korea pledged to hire 1,600 more workers for the stores.

Starbucks in Korea has started Siren Order, which is a service that makes online orders available. This has started in 2014, helping customers to order their drinks before their arrival, and picking them up as soon as they arrive. This service has led to nearly 5 million customers to register to the page. As there is high rise in orders, Starbucks in the United States, as well as Canada, Hong Kong, and the United Kingdom has added siren order to their service.

To reduce carbon footprint, Starbucks stores in South Korea will be eliminating all single-use cups by 2025. Starbucks stores in Jeju Island will be leading this campaign by only using reusable cups in all 23 stores allocated in the island. The customers can either choose to use their own cups, or deposit 1000 won to use the reusable cups provided by the store. When the cup is returned, the deposit will be returned through cash, Starbucks card or HappyHabit Application points. The reusable cups will be collected and cleaned up by a professional cleaner company, reducing the usage of single-use cups. The reusable cups will also be up-cycled to other forms as well.

Starbucks Korea has 870 cashless stores which is about 60% of the whole stores that are available in Korea. Due to this, there has been a reduction of people using cash from 4% in original stores to 0.5% in cashless stores. As there are more customers using cards and mobile apps, Starbucks has decided to reduce the amount of stores that use cash. However, for the elderlies and foreigners, they do accept cash in rare occasions. This is not only to apply the newest technology to the stores, but to apply the change of lifestyle, making it convenient for both the customers and partners.

Starbucks Korea said October 16, 2024. it has partnered with the country's leading retail lender KB Kookmin Bank to introduce account-based settlement services for its customers in the first quarter of next year.

Starbucks Korea announced on the 28th Oct. that it will increase the prices of 11 tall (355ml) iced beverages on its menu from the 1st of next month.

The price increase will include two blended drinks, six frappuccinos, one physio, and two refreshers, each of which will increase by 200 won.

==== Collaboration ====
BTS has collaborated with Starbucks to help support the youth in South Korea. Starbucks prepared limited edition merchandise and beverages that have the same shade of purple reminiscent of a starry night, while playing one of BTS songs "Make It Right" in the store. Through this event, Starbucks raised funds to support The Beautiful Foundation.

=== Caffé Bene ===
Caffe Bene is a coffeehouse chain based in Seoul. It was founded in May 2008 by Sun-Kwon Kim, its chief executive officer. Caffè Bene is the largest coffeehouse in South Korea measured by number of stores. As of April 24, 2012, it had 760 outlets.

Initially Caffe Bene struggled to gain any traction in an oversaturated American market. Failing to gain brand recognition, Sun-Kwon Kim agreed a deal with a number of entertainment shows to use his coffee locations in a selection of TV shows for a 3% share in the companies profit.

=== Ediya ===
Ediya is a mid-priced coffee chain, containing around 1,800 stores in South Korea since 2016. Founded in 2001, it is run by CEO Moon Chang-ki. In 2019, Ediya Coffee launched collaborated product with Kakao Friends (Kakaotalk; which is the famous Korean's communicating message app. It also has unique emoticons and those calls Kakao Friends).

Collaboration

In 2019, Ediya Coffee collaborated with Kakao Friends which are the representative characters of KakaoTalk company. The Kakao Friends are very popular because of its unique character cuteness feature and there's also Kakao Friends store where they sell character goods (accessories, dolls, golf wares, even the electronic products). With this popularity, Ediya coffee collaboration with Kakao Friends was successfully done. In March 2018, for the Spring signature drinks, Ediya Coffee launched 'Peach Blossom Latte', 'Peach Blossom Tea'. The following May, they released nine types of MD (character tumbler, water bottle, juice cup, straws etc.). The price range of MD's are from 1100 KRW to 12900 KRW(0.89 to 10.46 USD). Also released new drinks in the following year, in 2019 Ediya Coffee released three mini cakes that embody the appearance of the most popular characters (Apeach, Ryan, and Tube). Each of the cakes has different flavors depending on the character. Each cake costs 3500 KRW, which is 2.84 USD. The cakes that go well with coffee have drawn fervent responses from consumers.

=== 7-Eleven ===
The International Convenience store provided competitive 1000-won (87¢) coffee.

=== Pascucci ===
Caffe pascucci is an Italian coffeehouse chain with over 480 stores in South Korea.

=== Hollys ===
Hollys is a South Korean coffeehouse chain established in 1998.

=== A Twosome Place ===
A Twosome Place is a coffeehouse chain that used to be owned by CJ Group in South Korea from 2002 to 2021. It has now been taken over by The Carlyle Group since January 2022.

==== Collaboration ====
By having exclusive contract with TWG since 2017, A Twosome Place has been aiming for the growing tea market.

For the 20th anniversary, A Twosome Place have collaborated with Mardi Mercredi using yogurt in the menu to express the taste of spring. There are five different products being collaborated with Mardi Mercredi. Using the flower pattern, which is the signature pattern, A Twosome Place has prepared cups and water bottles as well as rugs for home decoration.

=== Paul Bassett ===
Paul Bassett is a brand name of coffeehouses that operates in Japan and South Korea, named after World Barista Championship winning Australian barista Paul Bassett.

=== Tom N Toms ===
Tom N Toms is an international coffeehouse chain originating in South Korea.

== Dalgona ==
Dalgona is a traditional Korean hard candy made with sugar and baking soda. But for Dalgona coffee, instead of putting hard formation candy into the coffee, make a whipped cream foam with Americano and sugar. Then put the Dalgona cream on top of the milk of your choice.

Dalgona coffee was newly invented during the COVID-19 pandemic. The reason Dalgona coffee got viral during that period was due to the pandemic; people were in a situation where they had to stay home for safety. The regulation of the pandemic was when the COVID-19 test results came out to be positive, people had to quarantine for 14 days. With this background situation, people kept searching for things that they could stay active and productive during the time they stay home. The process of making Dalgona coffee was perfect for people. To make Dalgona whip cream, at least 400 times or more stirring process is needed. It's hard to make, but it was a creative and innovative taste of coffee at that time because people could make 'coffee shop' coffee at home. People started to post themselves making Dalgona coffee and this became some sort of trend 'Dalgona coffee challenge' and it spread through social media such as Google, Instagram, TikTok and YouTube. It went viral not only in Korea but also it went widespread all over the world included not only the Asia but also Central and South America. Even after the pandemic ended, lots of coffee shops in Korea launched Dalgona coffee as one of the new menu items. One of the popular coffee chain, Ediya coffee launched 'Dalgona latte' in May 2020.

== See also ==
- Coffee in Taiwan
