= King Car Group =

Taiwanese food, beverage and consumer goods conglomerate

- Native name: 金車集團
- Type: Private
- Industry: Food and beverages, household products, biotechnology, aquaculture
- Founded: 1979; 47 years ago
- Founder: Lee Tien-tsai
- Headquarters: Taipei, Taiwan
- Key people: Lee Tien-tsai (founder); Y. T. Lee (chairman, 2026)
- Products: Canned coffee, whisky, beer, bottled water, insecticides and cleaning products
- Subsidiaries: Chu Chen Co. King Car Industrial; King Car Biotechnology; King Car Logistics; Mr. Brown Coffee; Buckskin Restaurant Group
- Website: kingcar.com.tw

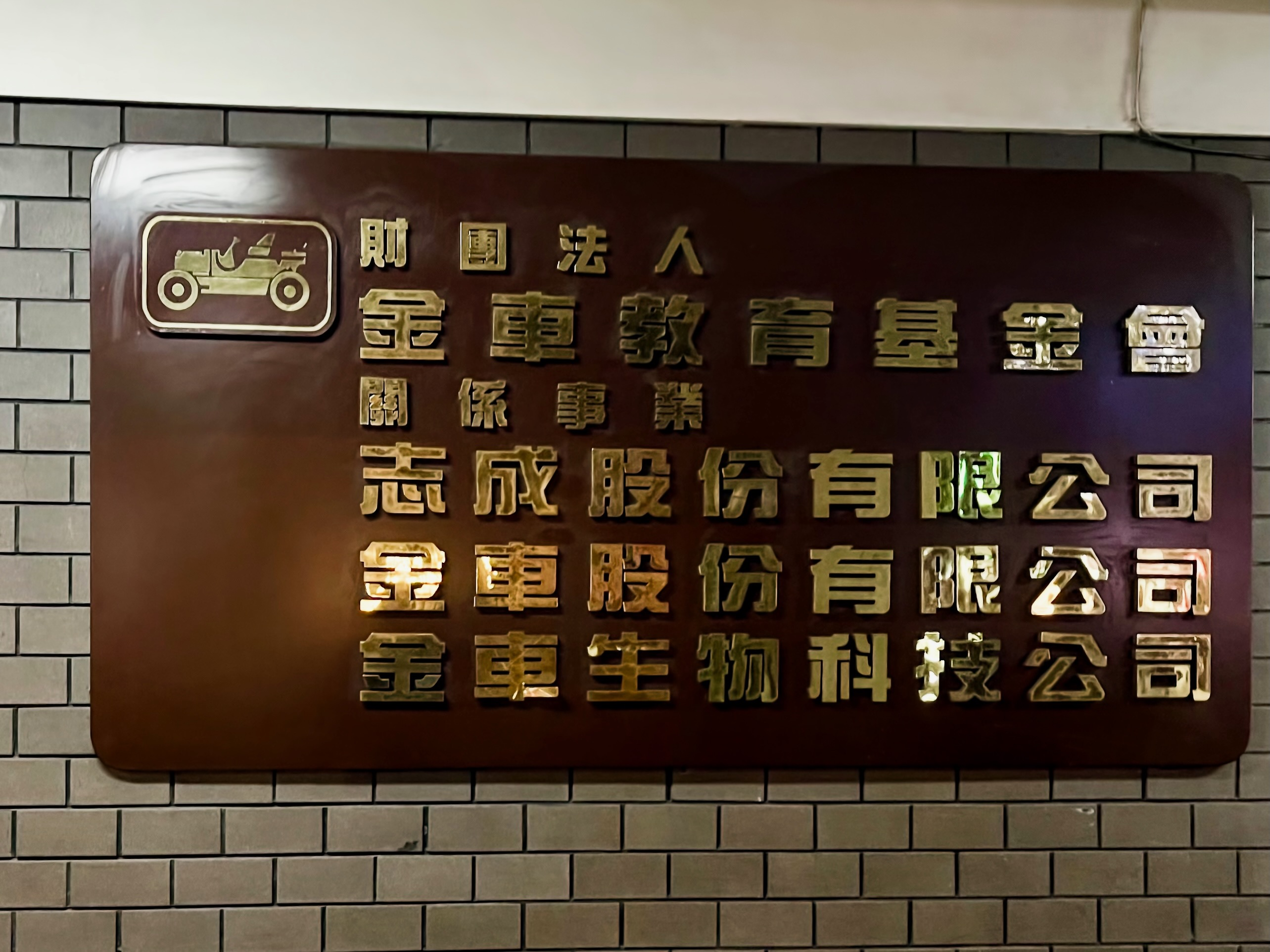
Photo of King Car Group sign outside their office on Roosevelt Rd in Taipei

The King Car Group (Chinese: 金車公司) is a privately owned Taiwanese conglomerate in food, beverages, household products, biotechnology and aquaculture. It owns brands that include the Kavalan Distillery, the Mr. Brown Coffee canned coffee and café brand, and the Buckskin beer brand. Its headquarters are on Roosevelt Road in Taipei.

== Name ==
The name King Car is a rough translation of the Chinese "to drive wealth."

== History ==
=== Origins ===
The group's roots lie in Chu Chen Co., established in 1956 to produce insecticides, mosquito repellents and household cleaning products. The King Car Group was spun off from Chu Chen Industrial and was founded in 1979 by Lee Tien-tsai. It first sold root beer, which was not lucrative, and in 1982 it pivoted to canned coffee, setting up the Mr. Brown brand on the advice of a Japanese mentor of Lee. The group's own account of its growth is that it began with insecticides, moved into beverages, and later entered flowers, aquaculture, biotechnology and whisky. In 1980 the group established the King Car Cultural & Educational Foundation, which it describes as expressing a philosophy of "giving back to society".

=== Coffee ===
Lee launched the Mr. Brown Coffee brand in 1982, and by the mid 1990s the Mr. Brown brand was dominant domestically and was expanding internationally. The brand later added cafés alongside its canned coffee range.

=== Kavalan and the alcohol market ===
In 1995 King Car tried to enter the alcohol market for the first time, but its plans were rejected by the government, which at the time held a monopoly on alcohol production. Taiwan's accession to the World Trade Organization in 2002 ended the state monopoly of the Taiwan Tobacco and Liquor Corporation and allowed private companies to make spirits. King Car began work on its first distillery, Kavalan, which opened in 2005; the production line was completed in about nine months, and the first Kavalan products reached the market in 2008. The group imported equipment from Scotland and Germany, brought in Scottish consultants and imported yeast from France and malted barley from Scandinavia, and its master blender, Ian Chang, had trained in England and Scotland. In 2015 the World Whiskies Awards named Kavalan's Solist Vinho Barrique the world's best single malt.

=== Beer and restaurants ===
In June 2018 King Car launched its first line of beer, aimed at a domestic market that Taiwan Beer had long dominated. It opened a brewery for the Buckskin brand in Taoyuan, using a Bavarian master brewer, Georg Rittmayer, as head consultant, and planned exports to Guam, Hong Kong and China. In the same year it founded the Buckskin Restaurant Group, which the group says owns three restaurants and a beer taproom, including a taproom at Taipei 101.

=== Recent developments ===
In March 2024 Lotte Duty Free signed a memorandum of understanding with King Car Group to open a Kavalan flagship in its Seoul store and to develop exclusive Kavalan products, with Kavalan stores planned at airports in Singapore, Melbourne, Guam and Hanoi. In March 2026 Kavalan appointed Gulf Brands International as its distributor in Bahrain, which the group described as its first market expansion of the year, and in October 2026 it appointed Cerbaco Distribution to distribute its whiskies in Australia.

== Organisation and leadership ==
Lee Tien-tsai founded the group and served as its chairman, and his son Lee Yu-ting, known as Albert Lee, became chief executive. Albert Lee was described as the group's chief executive when the Lotte agreement was signed in 2024, and in 2026 company statements quoted a King Car chairman named Y. T. Lee.

== Subsidiaries ==
The group's website lists Chu Chen Co., King Car Industrial Co., King Car Biotechnology Co., King Car Logistics Co., Mr. Brown Coffee Co. and the Buckskin Restaurant Group, together with the King Car Cultural & Educational Foundation.

=== Buckskin ===
Buckskin is a major Taiwanese beer brand based in Taoyuan. It was launched by King Car in 2018 to compete with Taiwan Beer.

Some 7-Elevens in Taiwan feature Buckskin beer on tap.

=== Chu Chen Company ===
Founded in 1956, Chu Chen Co. produces household and personal hygiene products, including insecticides, liquid mosquito repellent, mosquito incense, cockroach bait, cleaning supplies and laundry detergents.

=== Kavalan ===
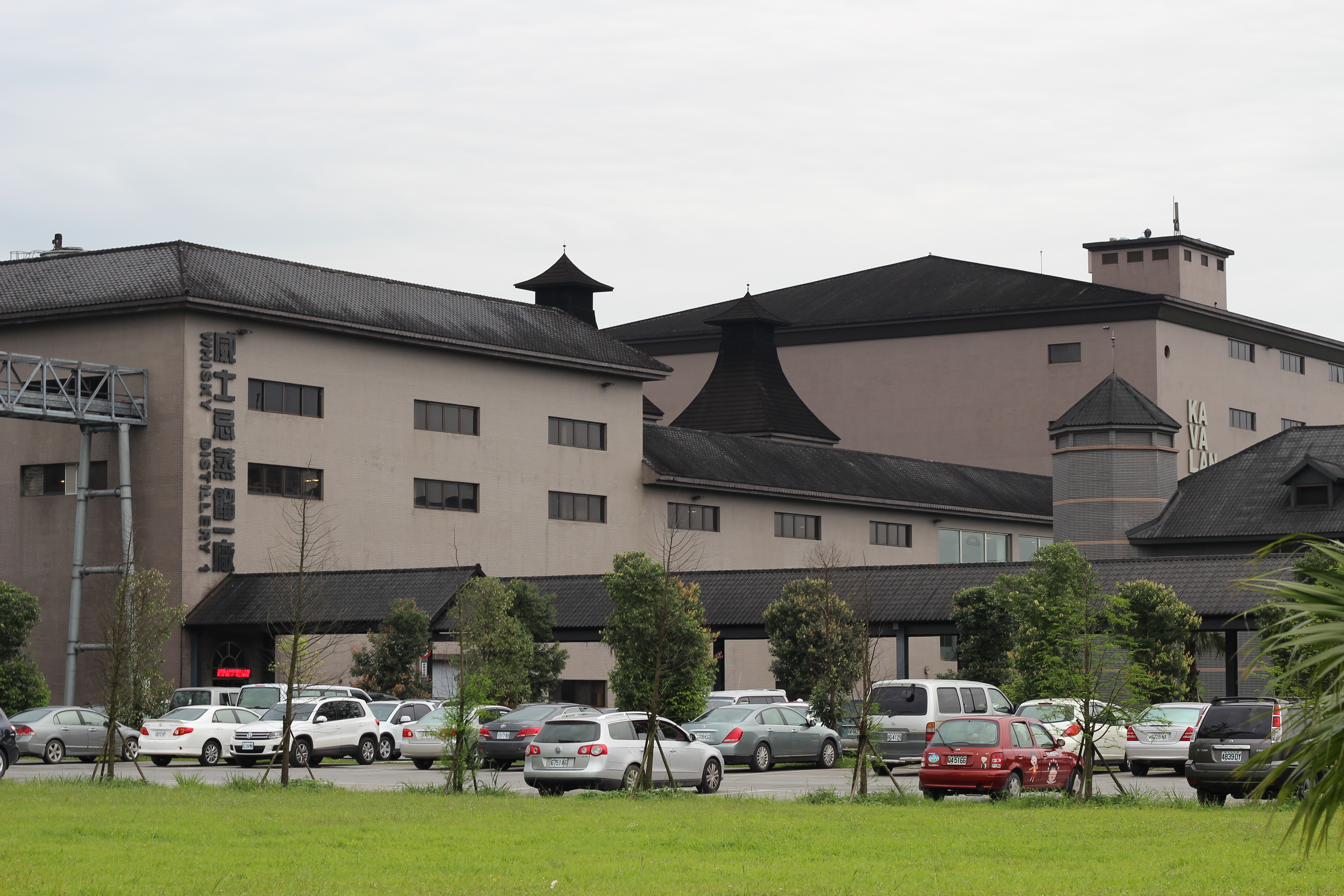
Whisky Distillery 1, King Car Kavalan Distillery

The Kavalan Distillery is the largest whisky producer in Taiwan and one of the best in the world, having won the World Whiskies Awards' single malt category. By 2016 it had won 210 first-prize awards since it began entering competitions in 2010. In July 2026 Kavalan's Peatist Oloroso Sherry Cask single cask strength single malt was named "Whisky of the Year" at the International Whisky Competition, after Kavalan Solist Fino Sherry took the same title the year before.

=== Mr. Brown ===
Mr. Brown Coffee operates retail coffee shops and sells a series of canned coffee products.

== King Car Cultural & Educational Foundation ==
The King Car Cultural & Educational Foundation was founded in 1980. It says its current work centres on four themes: social welfare, reading education, art education and literature promotion.

== See also ==
- Beer in Taiwan
- List of companies of Taiwan
- Taiwanese whisky
- I-Mei Foods
- Want Want
