= Spirits competition =

Spirits competitions are contests between makers of alcoholic beverages, in which master distillers, brewmasters and vintners compete to substantiate the quality of their products. Liquor, spirits, beer, beverage and wine competitions take place around the world.

== Competitions ==
- SIP Awards - International spirits competition
- International Wine and Spirit Competition
- Jim Murray's Whisky Bible and Liquid Gold Awards
- San Francisco World Spirits Competition
- London Spirits Competition
- International Whisky Competition
