= Georgia (coffee) =

Coffee drink brand

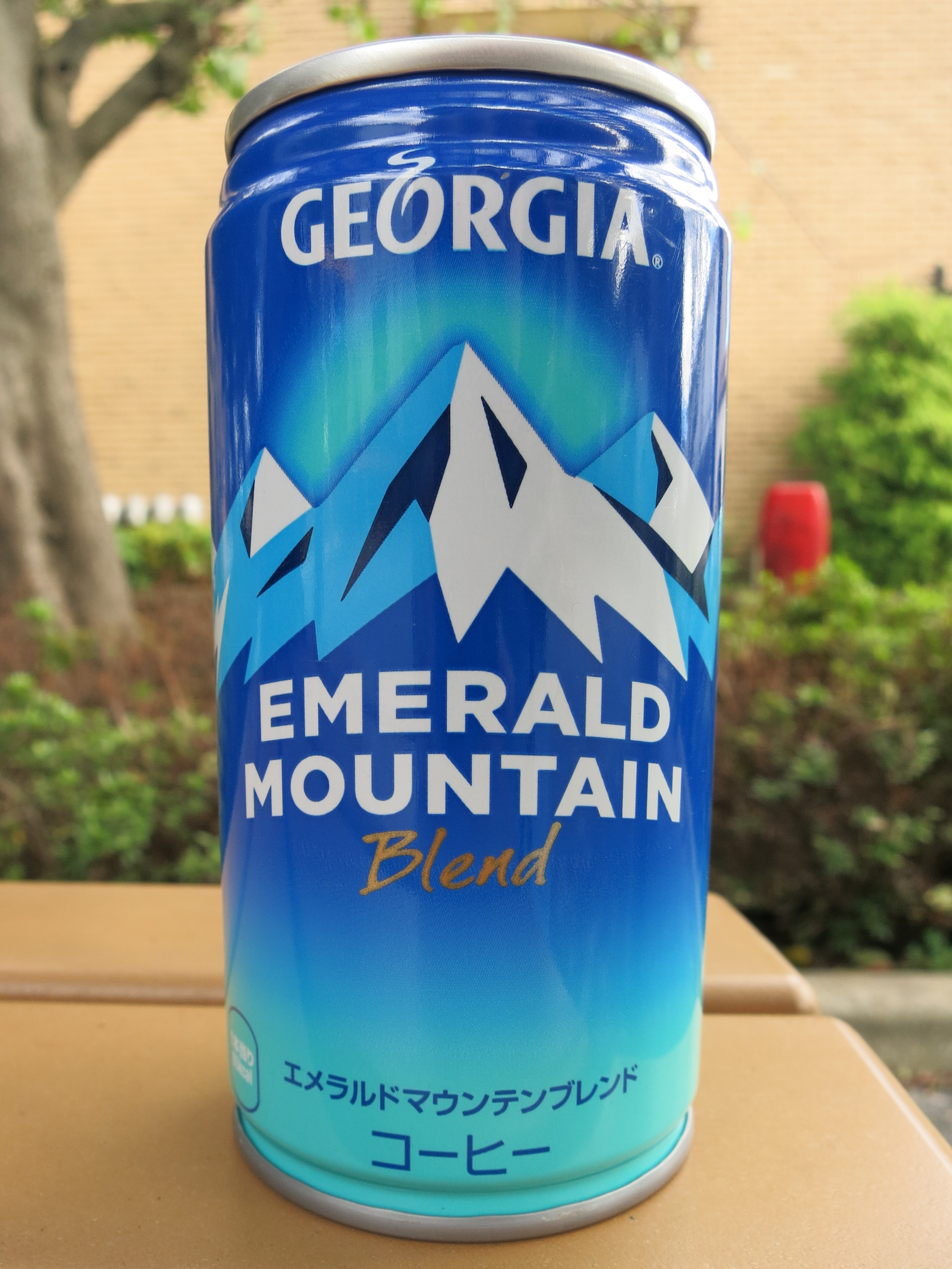
Georgia 'Emerald Mountain Blend'

Georgia (ジョージア, Jōjia) is a brand of coffee drinks sold in Japan by the Coca-Cola Company. The brand is named after Coca-Cola's home state of Georgia. Launched in 1975, it has since expanded to markets in Singapore, South Korea, India, Bahrain, and the United States.

== History ==
Georgia was launched in 1975 by Coca-Cola (Japan) Company, a Japanese subsidiary of the company. Georgia enjoys the most success in Japan, where it is the highest-grossing coffee beverage—one of many brands of Japanese canned coffee. It is also the highest-grossing beverage by Coca-Cola (Japan) Company. As of 2007, in Japan, Georgia's sales are double the sales of Coca-Cola.

=== International expansion ===
Georgia coffee was introduced in the United States in 2009, where it is almost exclusively sold in Asian grocery stores. In India, Georgia Gold is part of the non-carbonated beverage portfolio of Coca-Cola India. Under this brand, beverages are dispensed from machines, but not in the canned format. The coffee is freshly brewed from roast beans with variants like cappuccino, caffe latte, mochaccino, espresso etc. Other beverages, such as tea or hot chocolate, may also be offered from the same machine. The brand in India also features machines that dispense Iced Tea (Lemon & Peach) and Cold Coffee.

== Advertising ==
Characters from David Lynch's Twin Peaks advertised Georgia coffee in a four-part commercial series in 1991. In PlayStation Home, the PlayStation 3's online community-based service, Coca-Cola has placed a vending machine in Home that takes users to a space called the "Georgia Break Station". The vending machine also distributes original avatar items and presents, along with "C-pons", digital coupons that can be used to get real drinks from real vending machines. This is to promote Georgia series of canned coffee. The space is a lounge for users to sit and chat with two in-lounge avatars that talk about the Georgia coffee. It was available from September 7, 2009, to December 15, 2009. In 2012, the "Digital × Real Campaign" was a collaboration with Crypton Future Media featuring the virtual singer Hatsune Miku.

== See also ==
- List of coffee beverages
