= Mr. Brown Coffee =

Taiwanese canned coffee brand

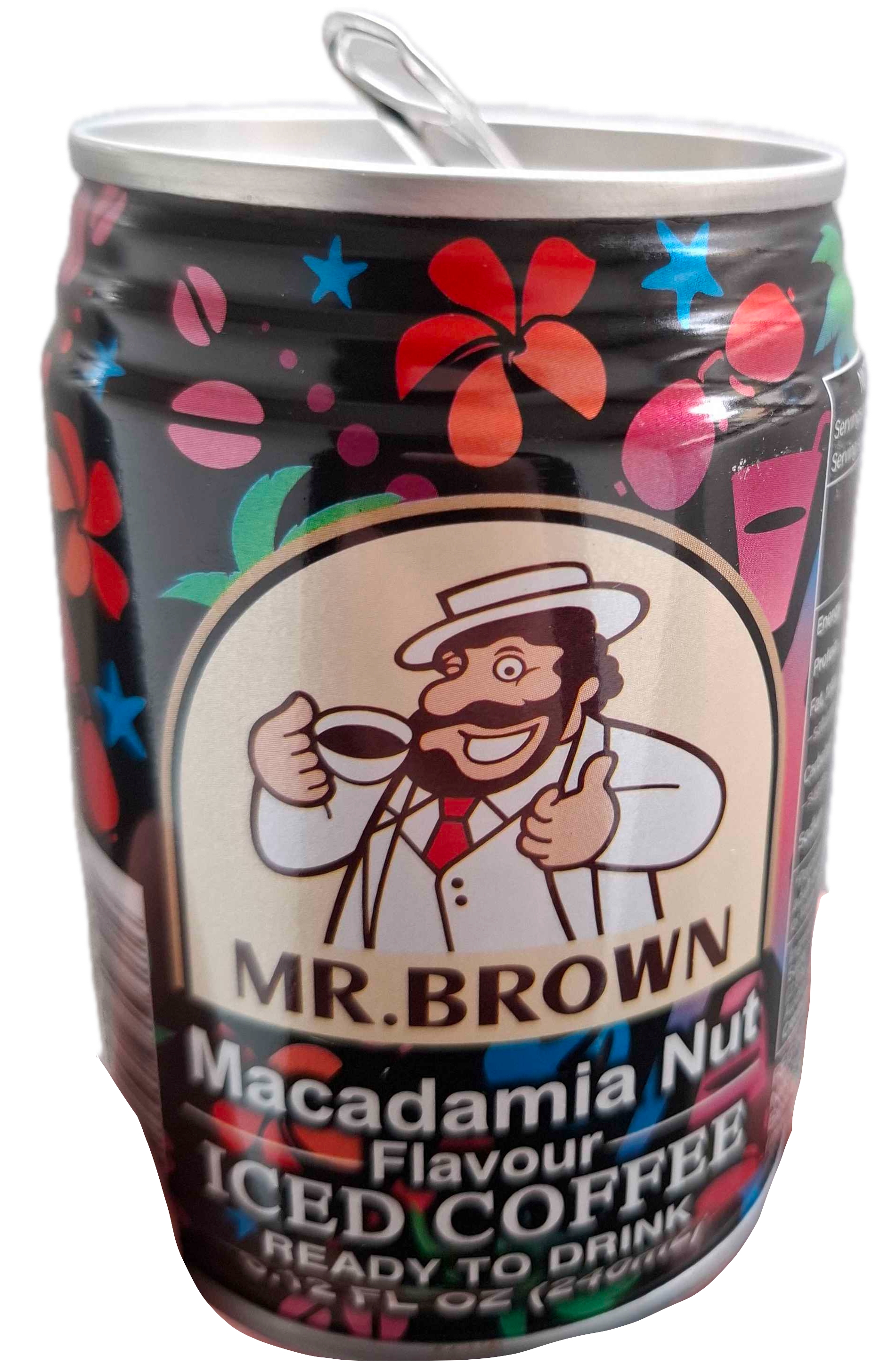
- A can of Macadamia nut flavor of Mr. Brown
- Product type: Iced coffee , canned coffee
- Current owner: King Car Group
- Country: Taiwan
- Introduced: 1982; 44 years ago
- Related brands: Coffee, milkshake
- Markets: Taiwan, Asia

Mr. Brown Coffee (Chinese: 伯朗咖啡; pinyin: Bólǎng Kāfēi) is a series of canned coffee products produced by King Car Group of Taiwan. It was launched in 1982. Mr. Brown Coffee is sold in 240ml steel cans and 330ml plastic bottles. Varieties include original, espresso, cappuccino, vanilla, Colombian, Macadamia nut, Black and Blue Mountain Style.

== History ==
As part of the 2008 Chinese milk scandal, it was discovered that the same melamine-contaminated milk was being used for Mr. Brown instant coffee mixes. The company then switched to New Zealand-sourced milk for their products.

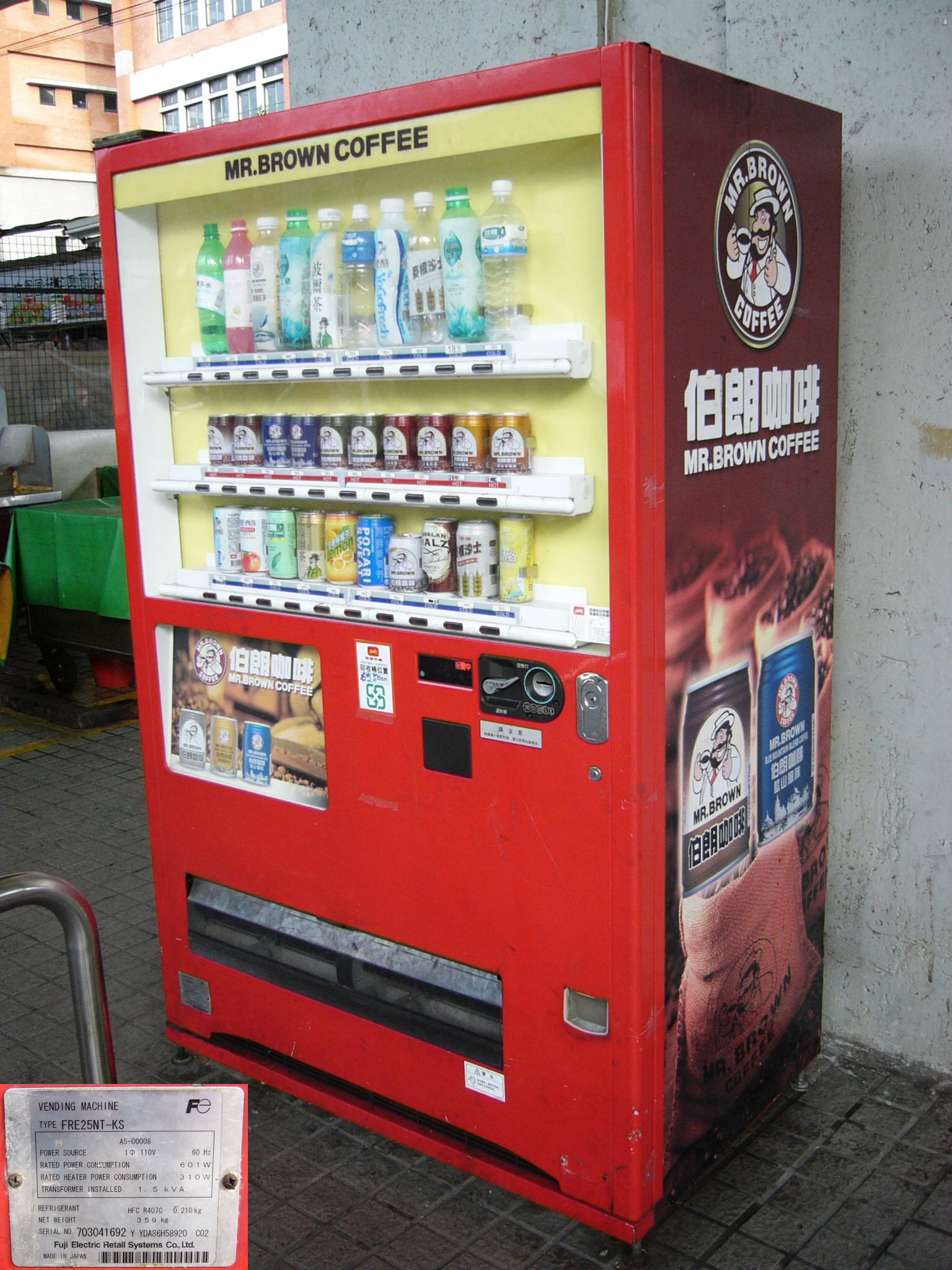
A Mr. Brown Coffee vending machine in Taiwan

In 2019, to celebrate Brunei's 35th National Day, Mr. Brown released specially designed cans featuring Bruneian landmarks such as the Raja Isteri Pengiran Anak Hajah Saleha Bridge and Sultan Omar Ali Saifuddien Mosque. In 2021, Mr. Brown also designed cans featuring Bruneinean front-liners with a message of "Together We Can Achieve The Target" which implies Brunei's full vaccinations target of 80% by the end of 2021. In 2022, to also celebrate Brunei's 38th National Day, Mr. Brown designed cans featuring a message that says "Proud to be Orang Brunei".

As of January 2019, Mr. Brown Cafe operated 38 locations around Taiwan.

== See also ==
- Coffee in Taiwan
