= Canned coffee =

Type of coffee drink

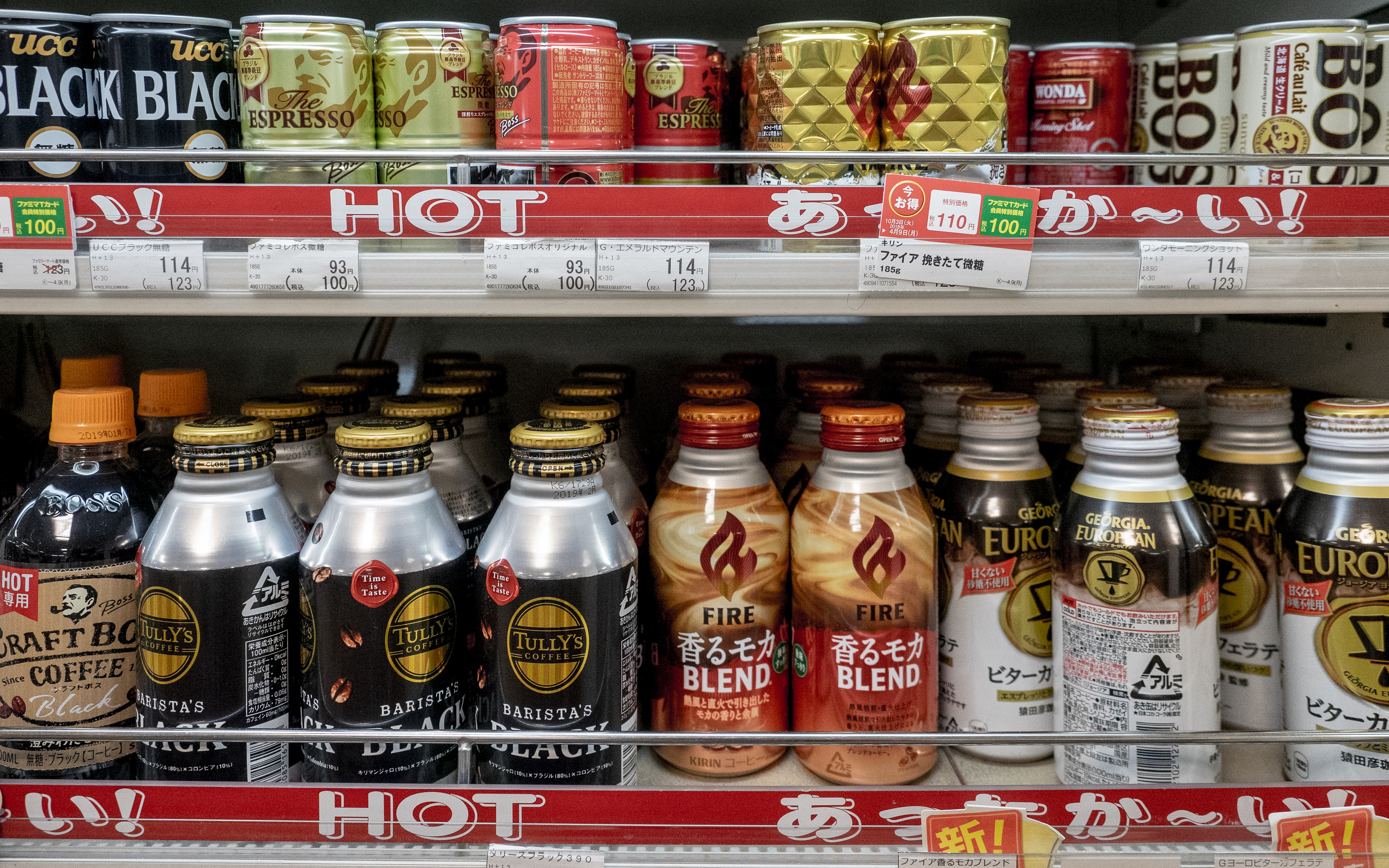
Various coffee cans for sale in a store

Canned coffee (缶コーヒー, kan kōhī) is a pre-brewed version of coffee, sold ready to drink. It is particularly popular in Japan, South Korea, and elsewhere across Asia, and produced in a number of styles and by a large number of companies. Canned coffee is available in supermarkets and convenience stores, with large numbers of cans also being sold in vending machines that offer heated cans in the autumn and winter, and cold cans in the warm months.

== History ==
Canned coffee is a Japanese innovation,. UCC Ueshima Coffee Co. is well known in Japan for pioneering canned coffee with milk in 1969. The official government web site of Shimane Prefecture, Japan, claims that the world's first canned coffee, Mira Coffee, appeared in Shimane in 1965, but this was short-lived.

More significant perhaps was the 1973 introduction by Pokka Coffee of the hot and cold drink vending machine. In 1983 canned coffee makers shipped more than 100 million cases.

Can design and shape have changed drastically. The earliest cans were simple in terms of graphic design and were often corrugated in the middle two-thirds of the can. Cans with straight steel sides appeared next, finally settling on a more modern shape. Like the earlier cans, this type also starts as a flat sheet that is curled and seamed. Extruded steel is also used extensively. Aluminum coffee cans are almost non-existent, although UCC Black is a notable exception.

== Companies ==
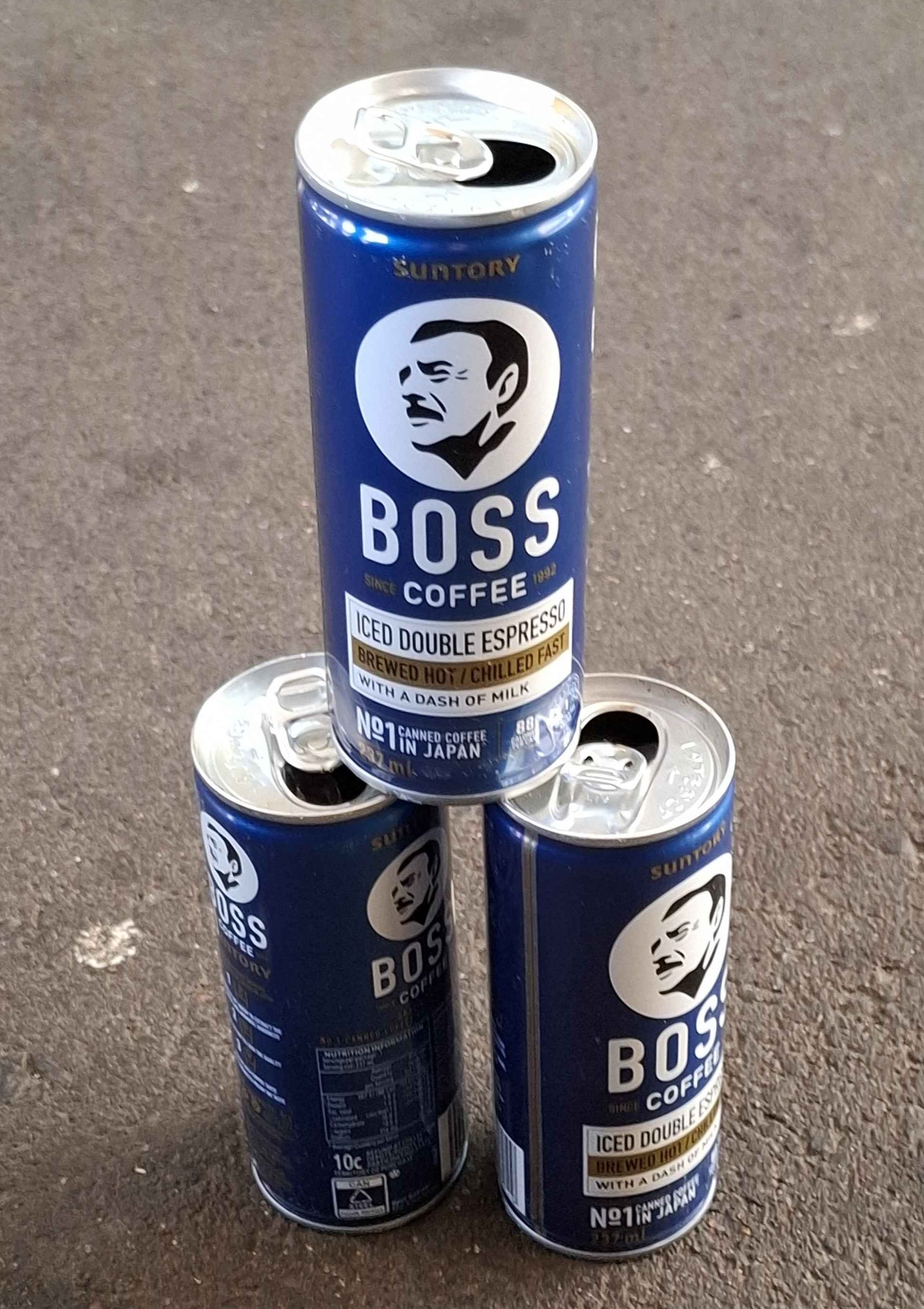
A stacking of Australian cans of Double Espresso variety of Suntory's Boss Coffee brand

Besides UCC and Pokka, all large Japanese beer, soda, and drink companies and most coffee companies either currently, or have at some point, offered canned coffee. Some of the more popular brands are listed below;

- Boss Coffee (produced by Suntory)
- Fire (Kirin Beverage)
- Dydo Blend (Dydo)
- Georgia (Coca-Cola of Japan)
- Nescafe (Nestlé)
- Roots (Owned by Suntory from July 2015, originally owned by Japan Tobacco)
- Wonda (Asahi Soft Drinks)

Other brands include Kissui (Sapporo Softdrinks, in January 2013 onward Pokka Sapporo Foods and Beverages), Itoen, Sangaria, Coffee Time (Yakult), BG (Meiji Dairies), and Cafe La Mode (Calpis). Regional and house brands are common, and the bigger companies offer regional versions of their coffee.

Outside of Japan makers of canned coffee include Lotte in South Korea and Mr Brown Coffee produced by King Car Group in Taiwan.

== Types ==
There are numerous types of canned coffee in Japan, most of which make up a typical company's line up. Very common is "milk coffee", which includes milk and is generally quite sweet. Black coffee is also popular, as are "low sugar" (微糖), cafe au lait, and milk coffee without sugar. Georgia has offered flavored coffees, such as hazelnut, but they are rare. Seasonal coffees are also produced, especially iced coffee, which appears during the summer months. The coffee varieties are often sold both hot and cold.

== Can design ==
The original UCC can had a capacity of 250 ml. In the 1970s, 190 ml cans appeared, and both of these can sizes still exist. Size does not denote type of flavor in either the 250 or 190 ml can, but iced coffee cans tend to be short and fat and contain 280 ml. American-sized (350 ml) cans are almost non-existent, although Dydo produces one of that size called "American Coffee". Barrel-shaped cans are also fairly popular, while an aspect of the Roots' marketing campaign is the company's unique "waist-shaped" can. A new kind of cone top type can with a twist-off cap has appeared in recent years, and many companies offer at least one of their coffee types in this kind of container.

Commemorative cans are quite common in Japan, for major events such as the Tokyo Motor Show, sports teams and sporting events, and manga characters.

== TV commercials ==
Boss Coffee uses Tommy Lee Jones in advertising. Jones has appeared in over 30 TV commercials for Boss since 2006 as his character "Alien Jones".

== See also ==
- List of coffee beverages
- Coffee vending machine
