= International Whisky Competition =

Annual tasting event in Chicago, US

- Logo of the International Whisky Competition
- Formation: 2009
- Founded: 2009
- Type: Competition
- Headquarters: Las Vegas, Nevada, U.S.
- Location: International
- Competition Director: Max A. Solano
- Website: https://www.whiskycompetition.com/

The International Whisky Competition (IWC) is an annual spirits competition that evaluates and ranks whiskies from around the world through a blind tasting process. The event is known for its rigorous scoring methodology and Olympic-style awards format, assigning only three medals per category to highlight only the very best spirits in each category.

== History ==
The International Whisky Competition was established in 2010 to provide a structured judging environment for whisky producers worldwide. In 2016, the results began being used to produce an International Whisky Guide.

Initially based in Chicago, the competition later became a traveling event. It has been hosted in various U.S. and international locations, including Las Vegas (2017-2019), Estes Park, Colorado (2020-2022); Bardstown, Kentucky (2023); the Isle of Raasay, Scotland (2024), and Louisville, Kentucky (2024 and 2025).

In 2014, Michael Petrucci stepped down from the competition, and in 2015 Sebastien Gavillet took over as head of the tasting panel, restructuring the competition and implemented a new tasting methodology. Starting in 2016, entry samples began being archived for referencing.

== Format ==
=== Scope and Participation ===
The competition judges a range of whisky styles, including single malt, blended whisky, bourbon, and cask-strength expressions. Award-winning entries have come from countries such as Taiwan, Malaysia, and India, with producers from, among others, Australia, Canada, Japan, and Scotland also participating.

=== Judging Process ===
The IWC's panel of judges evaluate whiskies using a double-blind tasting format. Judges do not know the brand, country of origin, whisky style, or alcohol content of the samples they evaluate.

Each whisky is assessed individually—not in direct comparison to others as is the case in other competitions—and scored across four weighted categories: appearance, aroma, taste/mouth-feel, and finish. Judges have up to eight minutes to evaluate each sample. Each whisky is then scored using a 100-point system based on 15 criteria, and gold, silver, and bronze medals are awarded to the top entries in each category. Besides the medal system, the competition publishes a ranked top 15 every year. This system was developed by Sébastien Gavillet and was implemented in 2015. Judges have included Stephen Beal and Francesco Lafranconi.

IWC Scoring System
Categories	Items	Points
Sight	Color	0
Sight	Visual Appeal	5
Nose	Intensity and Complexity	15
Nose	Distinctiveness of Aromas	10
Nose	Balance of Aromas	10
Taste	Palate and Balance	10
Taste	Alcohol Body and Complexity	10
Taste	Distinctiveness of Flavours	10
Taste	Balance Between Flavours	10
Finish	Length and Finish	10
Finish	Quality of Finish	10

== Awards ==
The International Whisky Competition presents a range of honors each year. The "Whisky of the Year" award recognizes the highest-scoring whisky across all categories. Other awards include "Distillery of the Year" and "Master Distiller of the Year".

In addition, the IWC presents Best in Class awards for specific categories such as Best Bourbon, Best Rye, Best Single Malt, and Best Blended Scotch. The competition follows an Olympic-style medal system, awarding only one Gold, one Silver, and one Bronze medal per category. This limited-medal approach is a defining characteristic of the IWC’s judging format.

== Results ==
=== Whisky of the Year ===
The Whisky of the Year title is awarded to the highest scoring whisky of the competition.

Year	Winner	Score	Distillery	Ref
2025	Kavalan Solist Fino Sherry Single Cask	97.04	Kavalan Distillery	
2024	Aultmore Oloroso Sherry Cask Travel Retail 25 Year Old	98.31	Bacardi (Aultmore)	
2023	Gordon & MacPhail Connoisseurs Choice Mortlach 1989 31 Year Old	97.1	Gordon & MacPhail	
2022	Aberlour A'bunadh Batch 70	95.8	Aberlour Distillery	
2021	Ardbeg Uigeadail	95.9	Ardbeg Distillery	
2020	Dewar’s Double Double 32 Year Old	96.4	Dewar’s	
2019	Glenmorangie Grand Vintage Malt 1991	97	Glenmorangie	
2018	Aberlour A'bunadh	97.4	Aberlour Distillery	
2017	Ardbeg Kelpie Committee Release	97.3	Ardbeg Distillery	
2016	Glenmorangie Signet	97	Glenmorangie	
2015	John Walker & Sons King George V	97	Johnnie Walker (Diageo)	

=== Master Distiller of the Year ===
The Master Distillery of the Year title is awarded to the distiller of the highest scoring whisky from a single distillery.

Year	Winner	Distillery	Ref
2025	Zerose Yang – Head of R&D	Kavalan Distillery	
2024	N/A	N/A	
2023	Bob Christine	Mortlach Distillery	
2022	Graeme Cruickshank	Aberlour Distillery	
2021	Dr. Bill Lumsden	Glemorangie & Ardbeg Distillery	
2020	Dr. Bill Lumsden	Glemorangie Distillery	

=== Distillery of the Year ===
The Distillery of the Year title is awarded to the distillery with the highest overall score, based on a weighted formula that factors in both product quality and portfolio representation. Partial submissions will reduce the final score.

Year	Winner	Country	Score	Ref
2025	Kavalan Distillery	Taiwan	92.78 (Avg.)	
2024	N/A	N/A	N/A	
2023	Kavalan Distillery	Taiwan	92.45 (Avg.)	
2022	Ardbeg Distillery	Scotland, UK	92.59 (Avg.)	
2021	Kavalan Distillery	Taiwan	N/A	
2020	Ardbeg Distillery	Scotland, UK	N/A	

=== Master Blender of the Year ===
The Master Blender of the Year title is awarded to the blender of the highest scoring blended whisky from two or more distilleries.

Year	Winner	Score	Distillery	Ref
2025	Drew Mayville (Mister Sam)	96.2	Sazerac	
2024	Stephanie Macleod	N/A	Bacardi	
2023	Stephanie Macleod	N/A	John Dewar & Sons	
2022	Stephanie Macleod	N/A	John Dewar & Sons	
2021	Stephanie Macleod	N/A	John Dewar & Sons	
2020	Stephanie Macleod	N/A	John Dewar & Sons	

=== Producer of the Year (formerly "Distiller of the Year") ===
The Producer of the Year title is awarded to the company with the highest overall score, based on a weighted formula that factors in both product quality and portfolio representation. Partial submissions will reduce the final score.

Year	Winner	Ref
2025	Bacardi	
2024	Bacardi	

=== Golden Barrel Trophy ===
The Golden Barrel Trophy is awarded to the winning distillery the produced the Whisky of the Year. The trophy will be kept by the winner until the following year's competition, and the name of each winner is engraved in the trophy's marble base to commemorate the history of each annual winner.

Year	Winner	Ref
2025	Kavalan Distillery	
2024	Aultmore Distillery (Bacardi)	
2023	Gordon & MacPhail	
2022	Aberlour Distillery	
2021	Ardbeg Distillery	
2020	John Dewar & Sons	

=== Scotland ===
==== Best Single Malt Scotch ====
Year	Whisky	Score	Distillery	Ref
2025	Oloroso Sherry Cask GTR 25 Years Old	95.10	Aultmore	

==== Best Blended Scotch ====
Rank	Whisky	Score	Distillery	Ref
2025	Double Double 21 Years Old	95.94	Dewar	

=== Best Indian Whisky ===
Year	Whisky	Score	Distillery	Ref
2025	DeVANS Gianchand Indian Single Malt Whisky Adambaraa	92.68	DeVANS	

== See also ==
- San Francisco World Spirits Competition
- International Wine and Spirit Competition
- Ultimate Spirits Challenge
- Spirits competition

== Books ==
"World Whisky more, issue 3 – Kindle Edition". Amazon. RosettaBooks.
