= Boss Coffee =

Japanese coffee drink brand

Suntory Boss Coffee
- Logo used in Japan

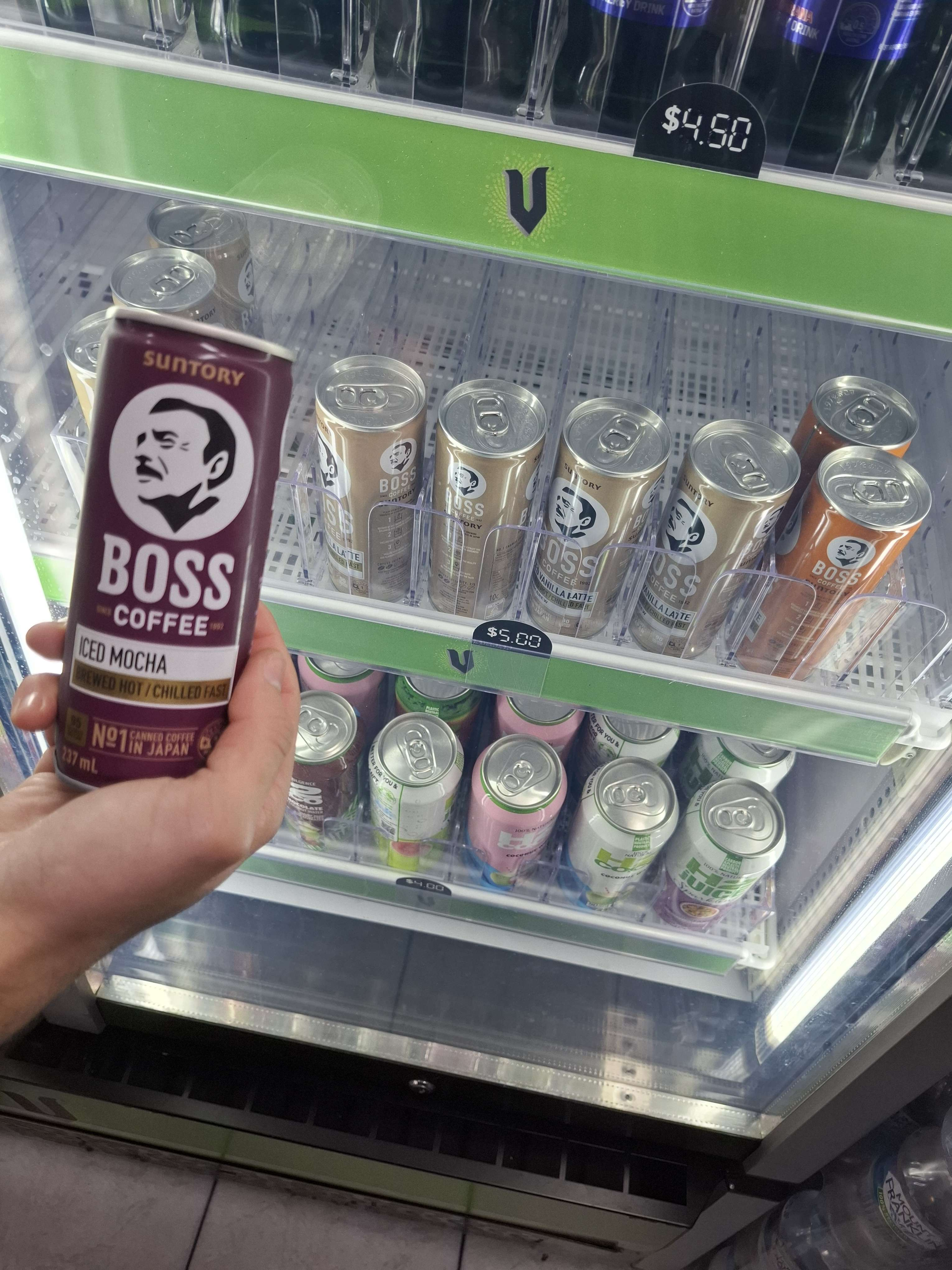
- Various flavors of Boss Coffee inside of a vending machine in Sydney, Australia
- Type: Iced coffee
- Distributor: Suntory (Japan); Suntory Oceania (International)
- Origin: Japan
- Website: www.suntory.co.jp/softdrink/boss

Boss (ボス, Bosu), marketed outside of Japan as Suntory Boss Coffee, is a brand name of canned and plastic bottled coffee and coffee-flavored beverages sold by Suntory in Japan. From 1992 to 2019, the brand was exclusive to Japan, gaining a cult following. Since 2019, it was introduced to various international markets, most notably in the Australian market, where it has since grown to become the market leader.

== History ==
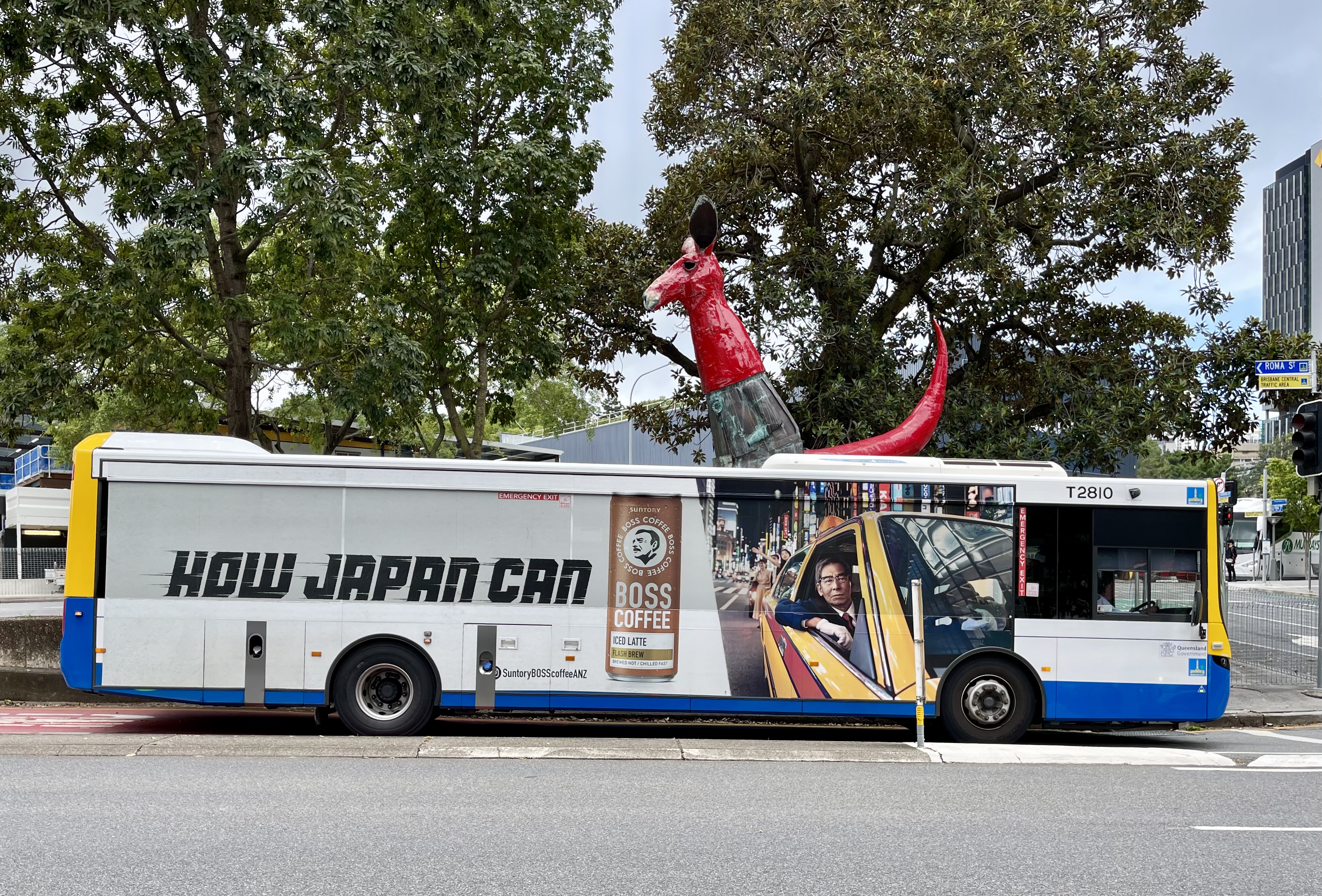
Boss Coffee advertisement on bus in Brisbane, 2021

Boss was first released in 1992 and is one of many brands of Japanese canned coffee. The original Japanese logo featured a man smoking a pipe and was designed to resemble an “ideal boss”; the image may have been inspired by author William Faulkner. The product was initially released with a single flavor, “Super Blend”, but later expanded to encompass several varieties including Boss Rainbow, which features a rainbow-colored can. In 2022, Suntory released a limited edition All-Star blend which combined five past flavors to celebrate the brand's 30th anniversary.

Since 2006, American actor Tommy Lee Jones has appeared as "Alien Jones" in a series of TV commercials and billboards for the brand, becoming one of the most recognised faces in Japan.

The Suntory Boss brand was launched in Australia, New Zealand, and the U.S. in 2019, with two products. In the U.S., Australian and New Zealand product lines, the logo does not include a pipe. Outside of the Japanese domestic markets, specifically in Australia, the brand markets itself in a way that emphasizes its Japanese origin, likely due to the prevalence of the Cool Japan subculture in Australia, with commercials that typically display working class Japanese environments with the drink motivating the worker to achieve better with the slogan "How Japan Can".

In Australia and New Zealand, the brand is distributed by Suntory Oceania, the same owner as the V energy drink, which had notable established distribution infrastructure in the region prior to the introduction of Boss Coffee. Boss Coffee primarily competes in the Australian market with Oak, Ice Break, Farmers Union Iced Coffee and Dare Iced Coffee. Initially, all of Suntory Boss' competitors were sold in plastic bottle or milk carton packaging, which was the mainstream in Australia prior to the arrival of Japanese canned coffee, until April 2025 when Dare released Dare Charged, a stronger version of its original iced coffee in a 240ml can as a direct domestic competitor to Suntory Boss' dominance in the Australian market.

== Gallery ==
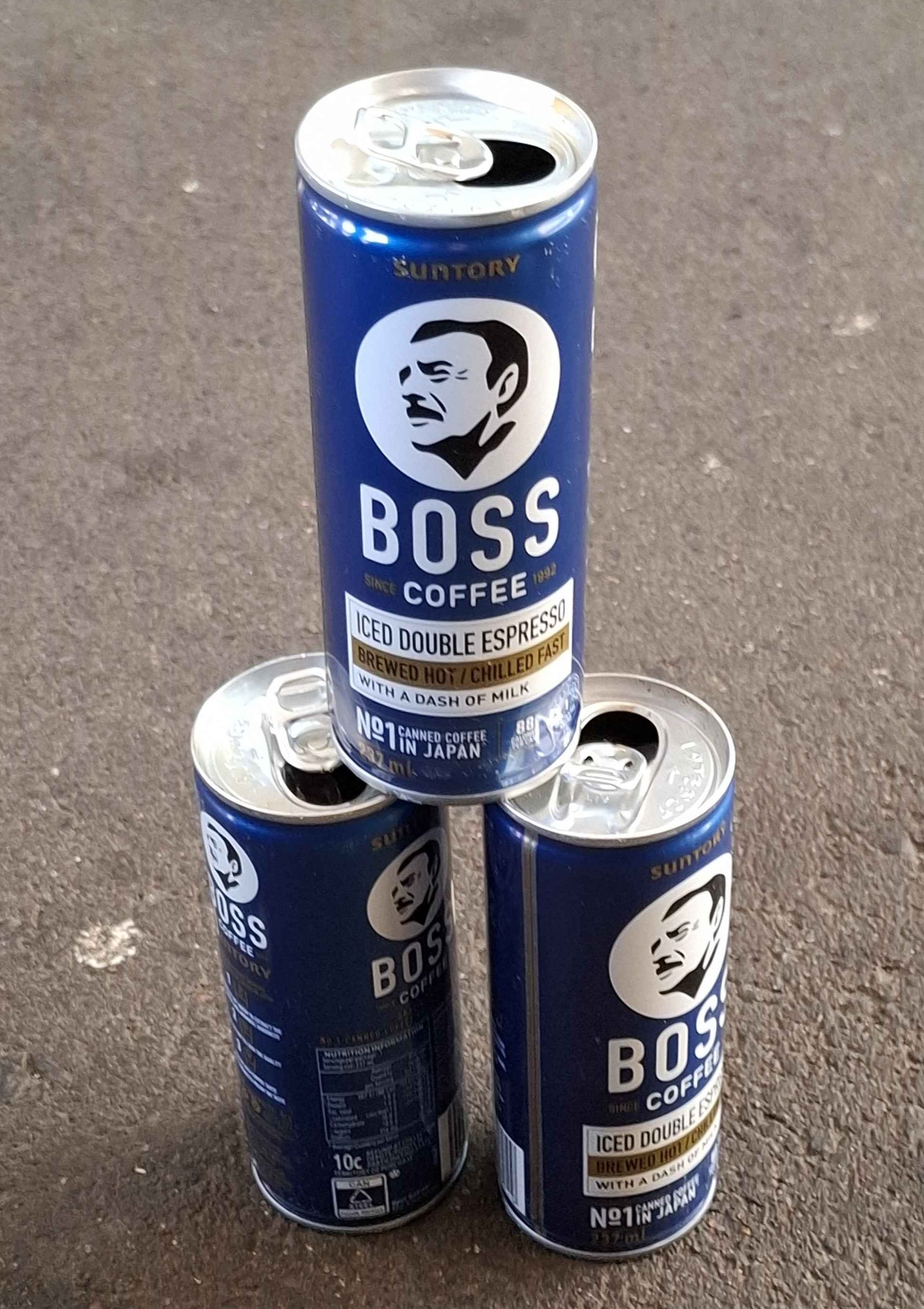
A stacking of Australian cans of Double Espresso variety Boss Coffee

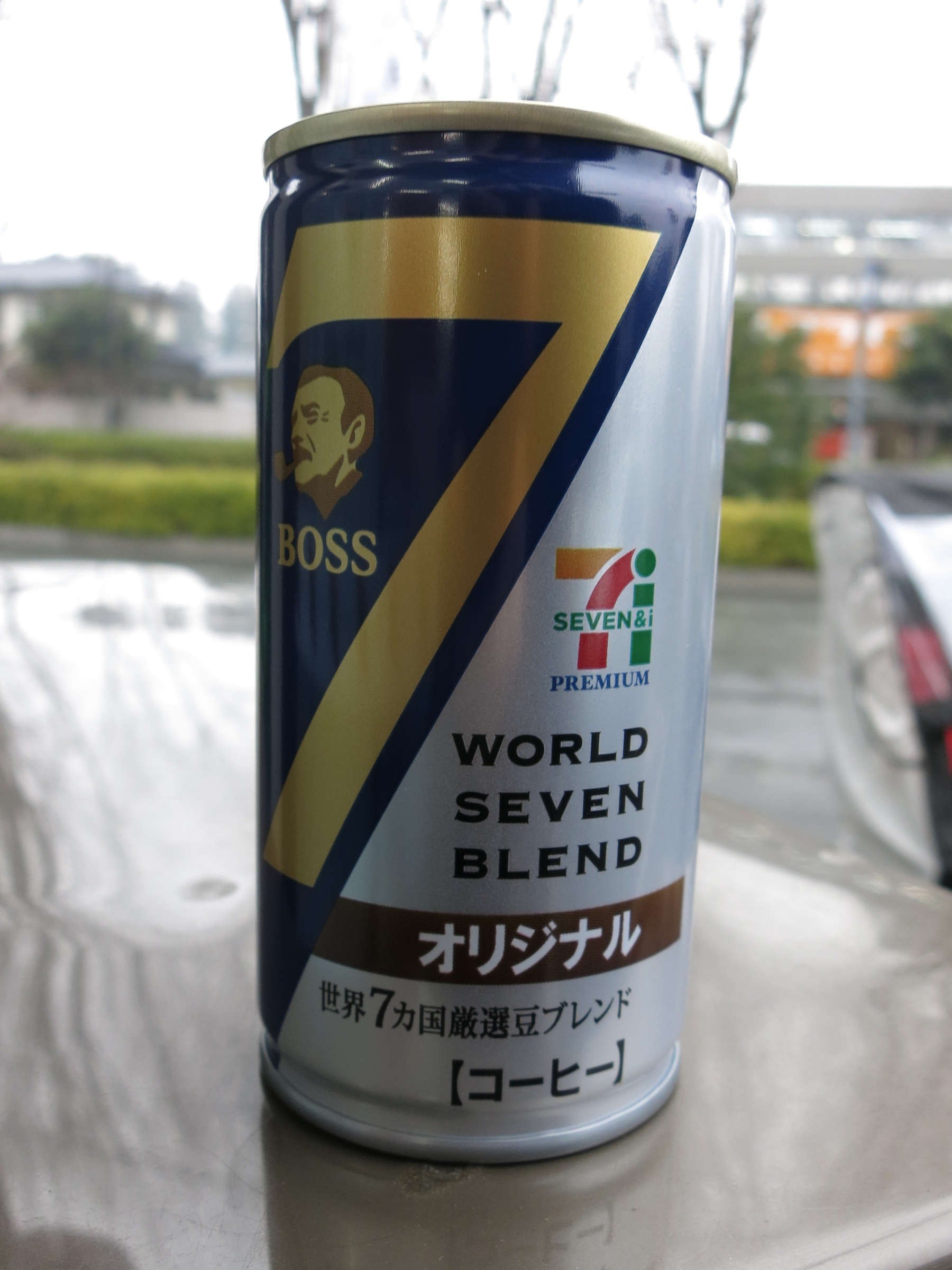
Variation of Boss Coffee distributed exclusively for 7-Eleven

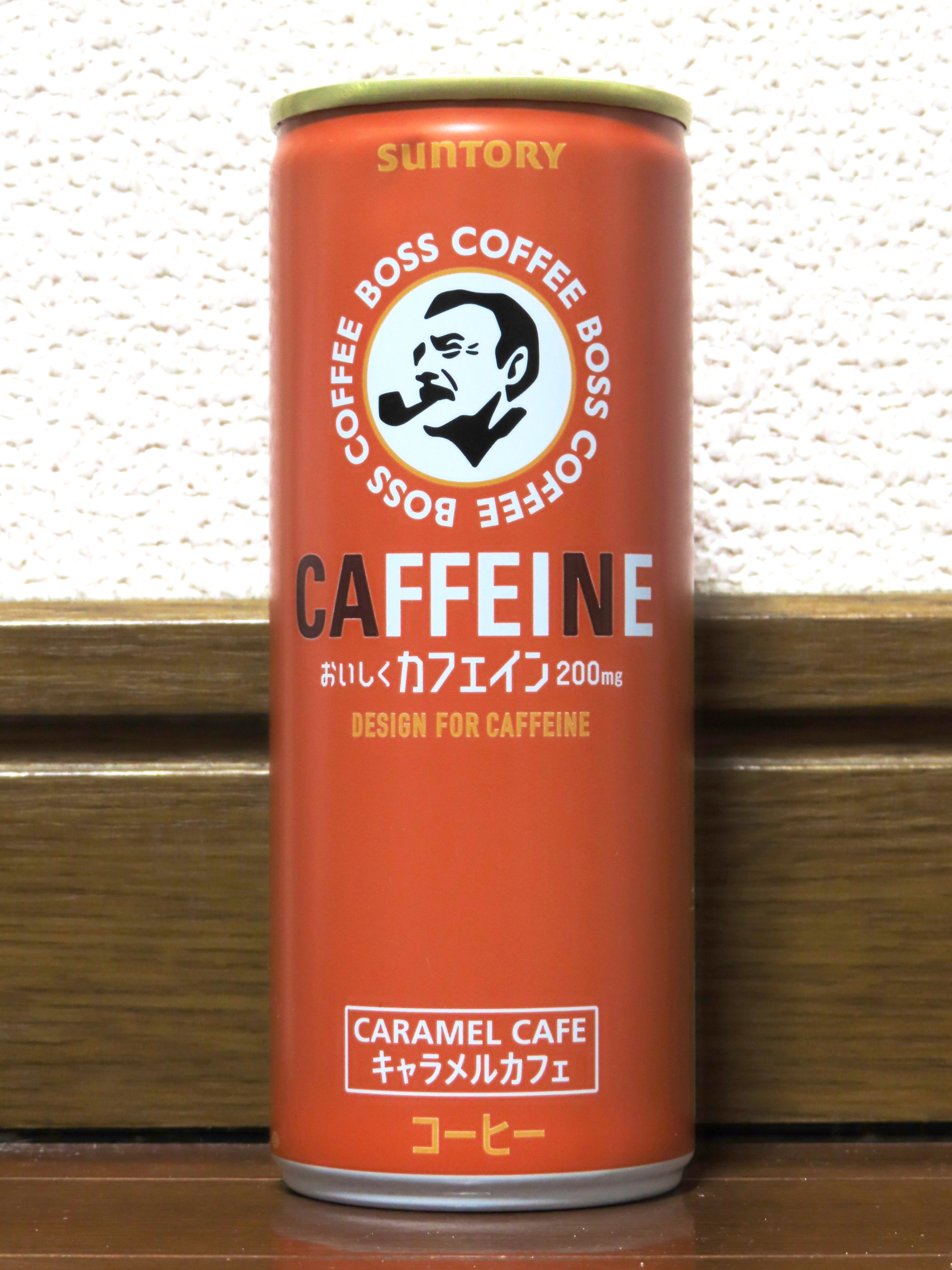
Caramel flavour of Boss Coffee

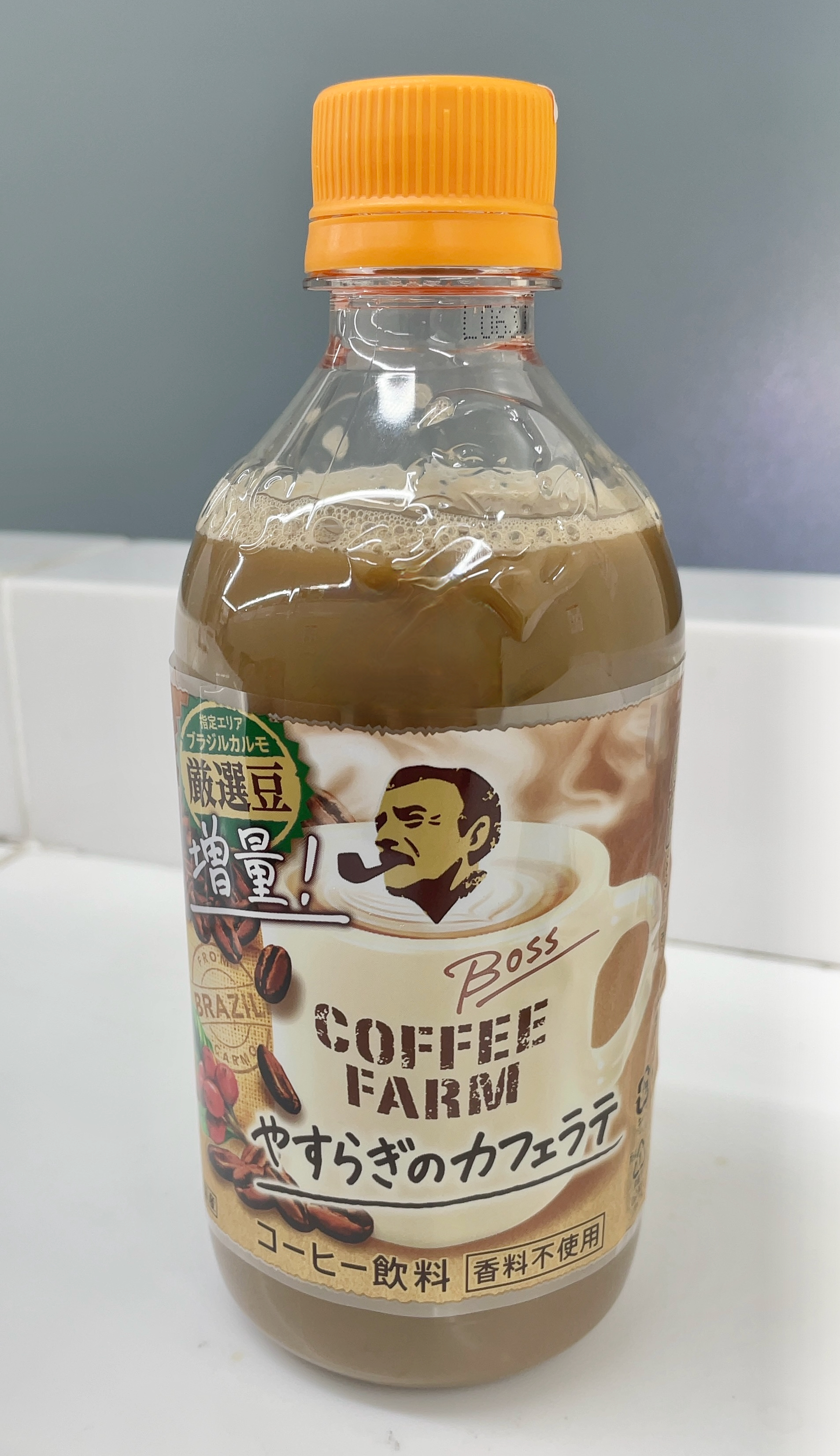
Cafe Latte flavour sold under the "Craft Boss" subbrand

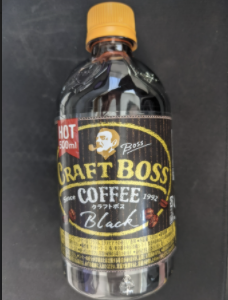
Black Coffee flavour sold under the "Craft Boss" subbrand

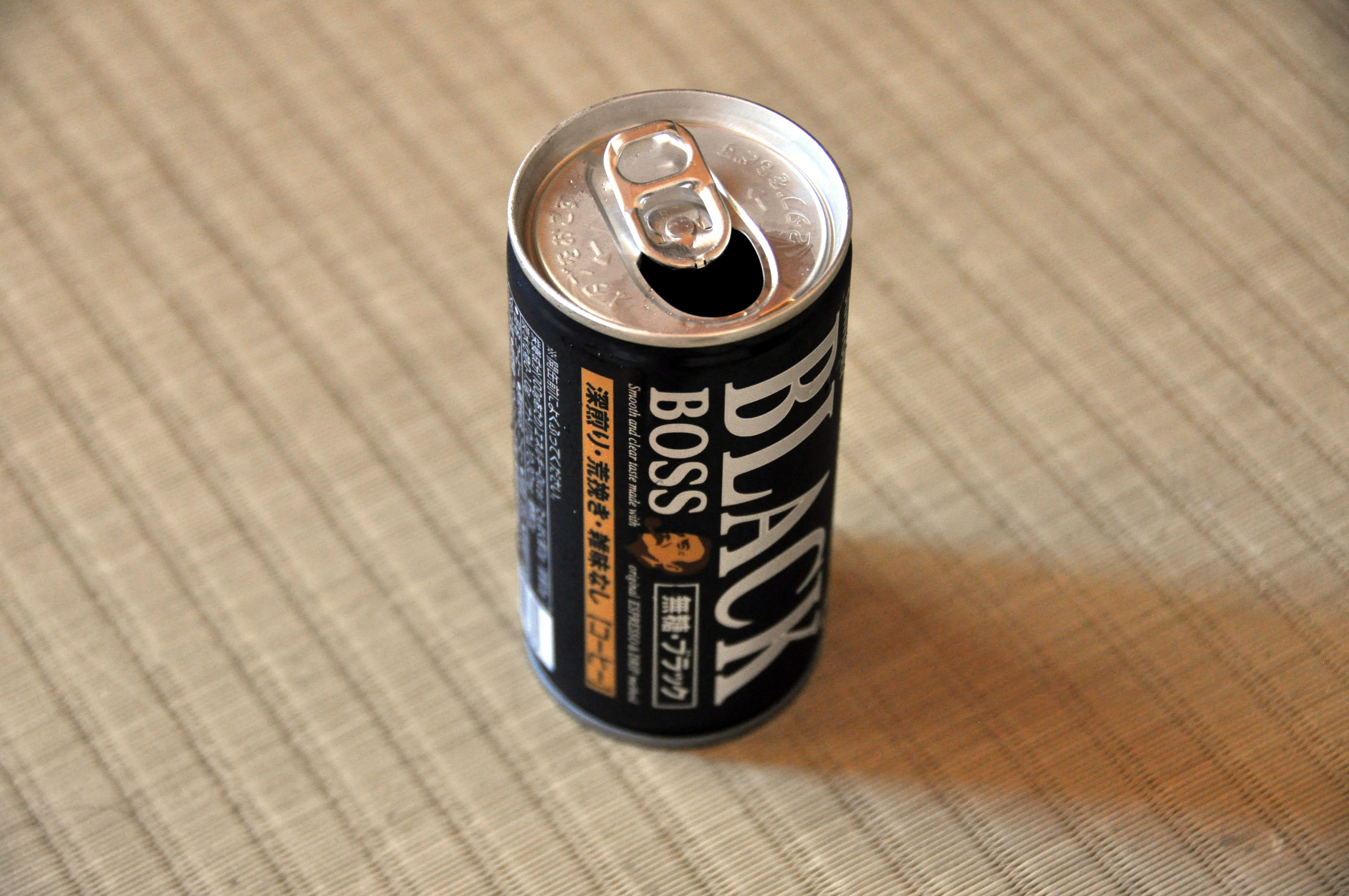
A can of Black Coffee style Boss Coffee

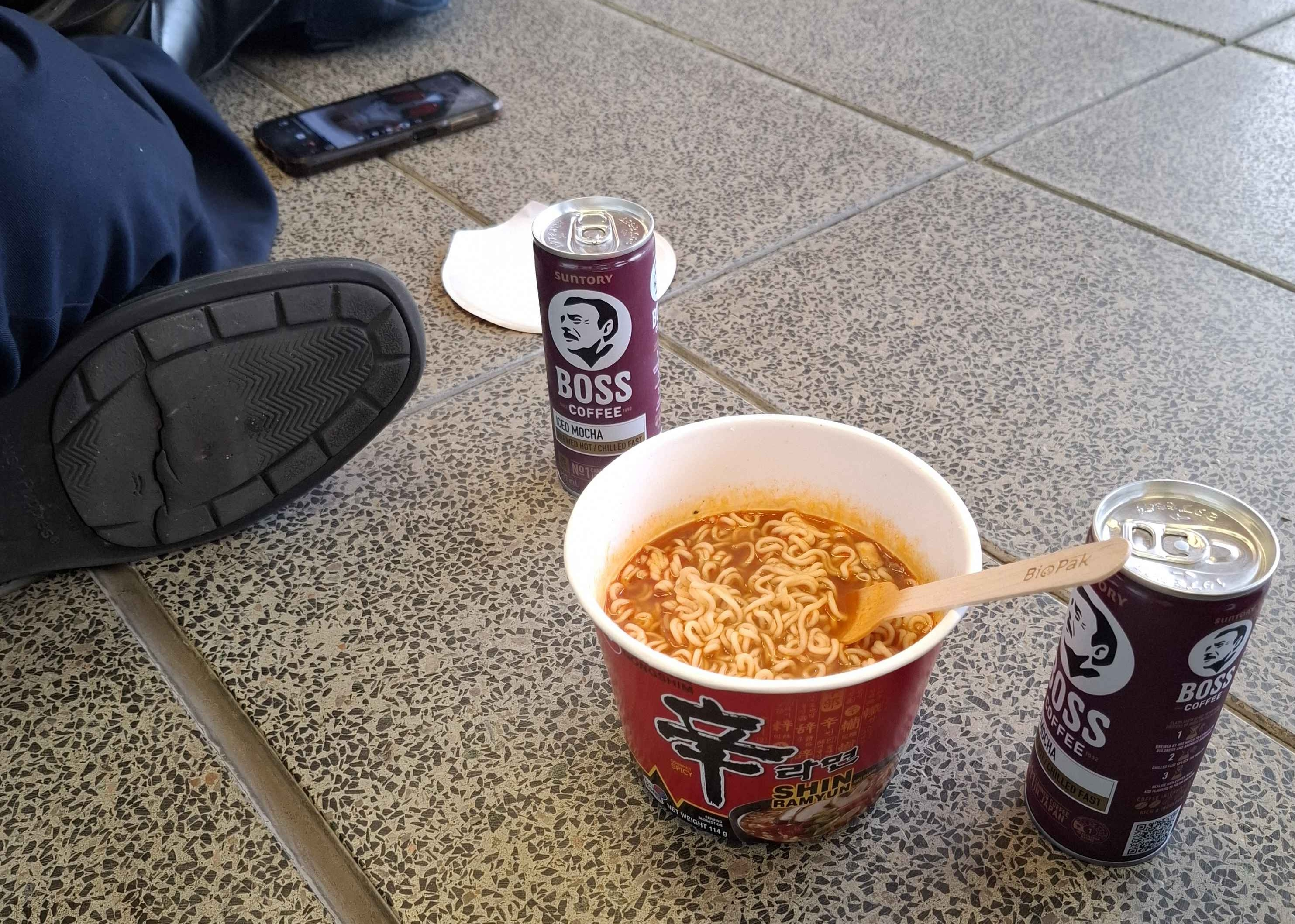
Mocha flavoured Boss Coffee paired with Shin Ramyun

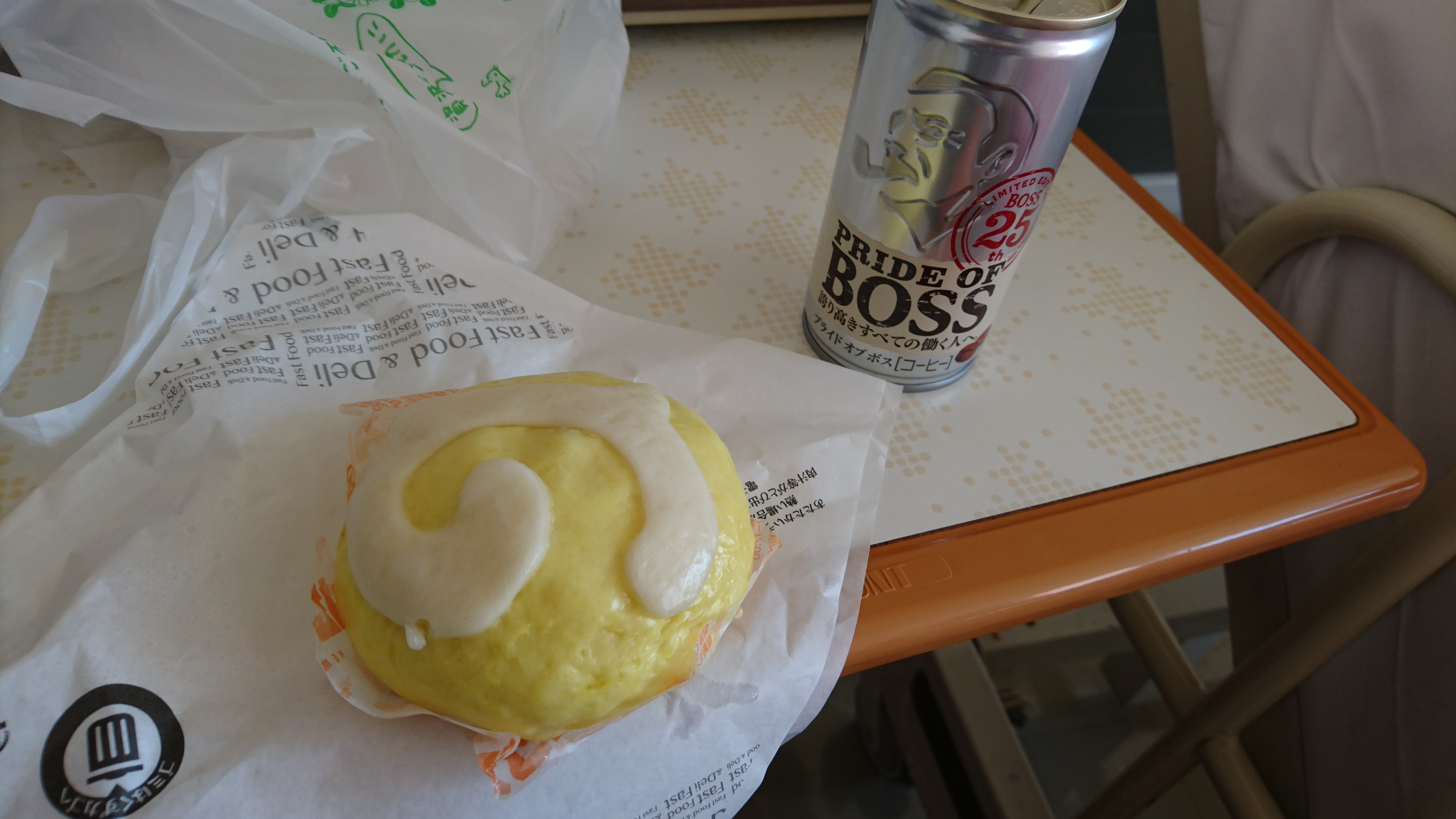
"Pride of Boss" variety paired with a Japari-man from FamilyMart

== See also ==
- List of coffee beverages
