= Es yen =

Espresso yen (from espresso + Thai: เย็น, meaning 'cold espresso'), commonly shortened to es yen, is a style of iced coffee from Thailand. It consists of shots of espresso mixed with sweetened condensed milk and served with ice. When it first became popular in the 2010s, the drink's name was controversial in Thailand, as some saw the corruption of the original meaning of espresso as an ignorance of proper coffee culture. Since then, however, it has become recognized and promoted as a distinct, uniquely Thai drink.
