= Hudsons Coffee =

Australian coffee retailer chain

- Founded: 1998
- Founder: Ros Hudson & Mark Hawthorne
- Headquarters: Port Melbourne, Australia
- Number of locations: 80
- Products: Coffee
- Owner: Emirates Group
- Website: hudsonscoffee.com.au

Hudsons Coffee is an Australian chain of coffee retailers. As of August 2013, it comprises 67 stores across Australia, as well as one store at Changi Airport in Singapore. It is owned by the Emirates Group which includes the Emirates airline, the Costa Coffee franchise in the United Arab Emirates, and Left Bank lounge bar and restaurants in Dubai, Abu Dhabi, Oman and Southbank in Melbourne.

== History ==
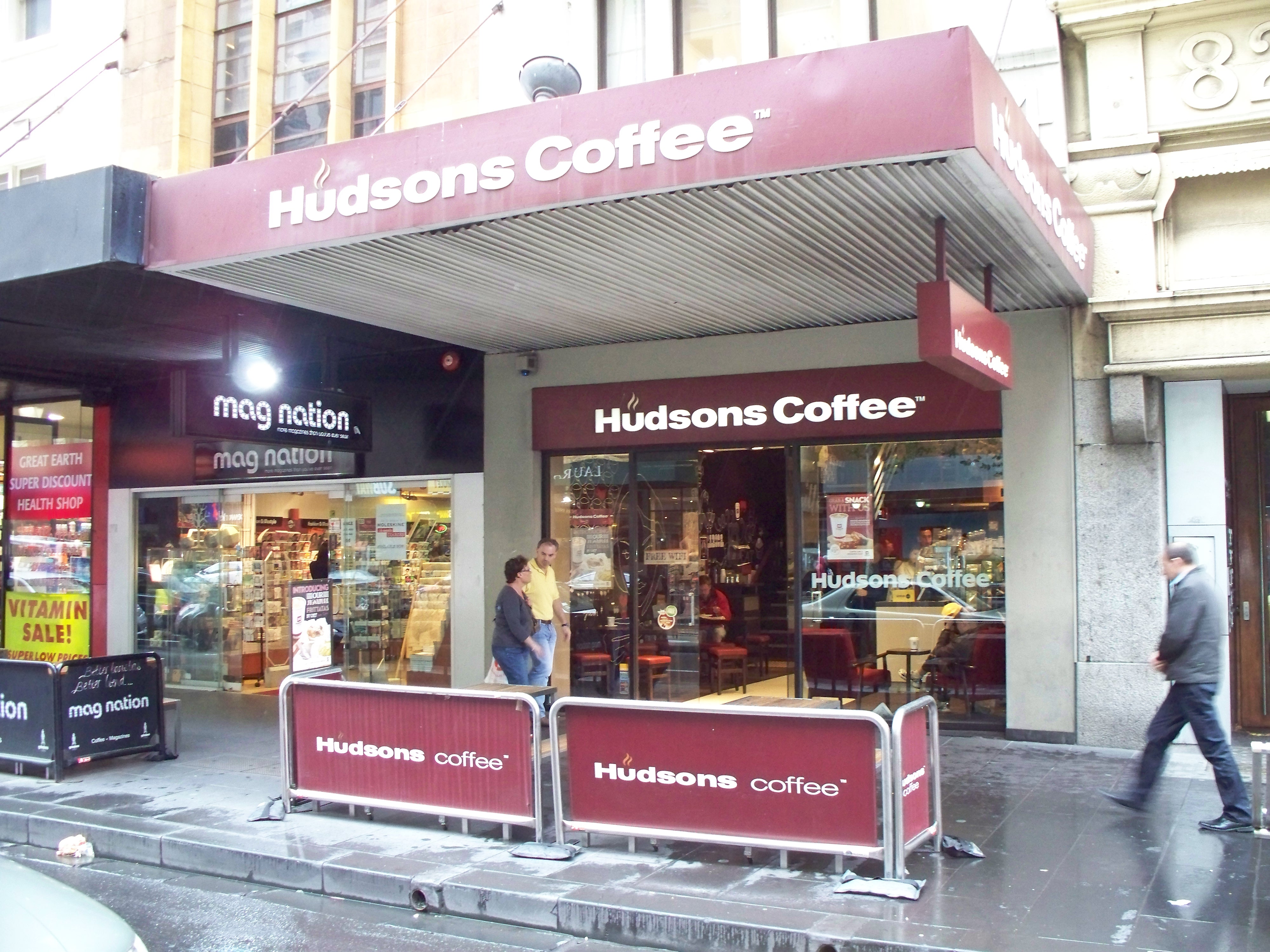
The flagship Hudsons Coffee outlet in Elizabeth Street, Melbourne. This location went through a refurbishment in August 2013 incorporating the new look and logo.

Hudsons Coffee was founded in December 1998 by long-time friends, Ros Hudson and Mark Hawthorne that came out from England, when they established their first outlet in Elizabeth Street, Melbourne. They started the cafe as a family oriented business and normally gave generous discounts to their family members and friends. They chose the 'Hudsons' name simply to give the business an "international feel," and even considered using a stylised picture of New York City's Chrysler Building as the company logo. In August 1999, they opened their second outlet on Melbourne's Bourke Street without the competition of big multinationals that were ready to enter the market (Starbucks were yet to enter, and Gloria Jean's were looking to expand their Australian franchise, as they only had two test sites in New South Wales).

In 2001, the company opened its first store outside Victoria on Adelaide's Grenfell Street (it has since moved further down the road to Currie Street), and in April 2003, that store became Hudsons' first franchised operation. Also in 2003, Hudsons Coffee commenced rolling out its first Wi-Fi hotspots within Melbourne CBD outlets, and by the end of that year the chain had expanded to 25 outlets. By August 2007, Hudsons Coffee operated 38 stores, and by January 2009, it had expanded to 47 with nearly half being franchised. It was then, in 2009, the chain was acquired by Emirates Leisure Retail (Australia) which saw the head office relocated to Emirates House in Collins Street, Melbourne.

In May 2013, the chain introduced a second blend of coffee that is a darker roast with caramel undertones called, Barista's Choice. This blend is offered alongside the other established blend, Hudsons Premium Blend, which consists of a medium/dark roast and subtle hints of cocoa and vanilla. In addition to this, all blends are also available for purchase in 50g pre-ground take home bags or 1 kg of whole beans which can be ground on request.

== Locations ==
A Hudsons Coffee outlet in Murray Street, Hobart

Hudsons Coffee has at least one store in every Australian state and territory.

Unlike other chain coffee retailers like Gloria Jean's, Hudsons Coffee does not usually operate from shopping centres (except the Westfield Southland location within the Myer store). Instead, it focuses on CBDs, hospitals and airports. Since being taken over by Emirates, Hudsons Coffee has stated their goal to expand its airport portfolio exclusively through company-owned outlets, while offering growth in all other locations as franchised operations (either through new outlets or converting existing company-owned stores). This will eventually see the company structure split based purely on location. Since 2011, the company has kept store numbers relatively stable with an equal amount of closures and franchise conversions (like Westfield Chatswood and Lonsdale Street, Melbourne), balancing against new stores (like Niddrie and Burnie). As of July 2013, one Melbourne Airport T2 (within international departures) outlet is the only one that operates 24 hours a day, 7 days a week.

The newest outlet is located in Sydney Airport T2 (domestic departures) which opened in August 2013. It is co-located with a new Coopers Alehouse bar which is also operated by Emirates.

== Menu ==
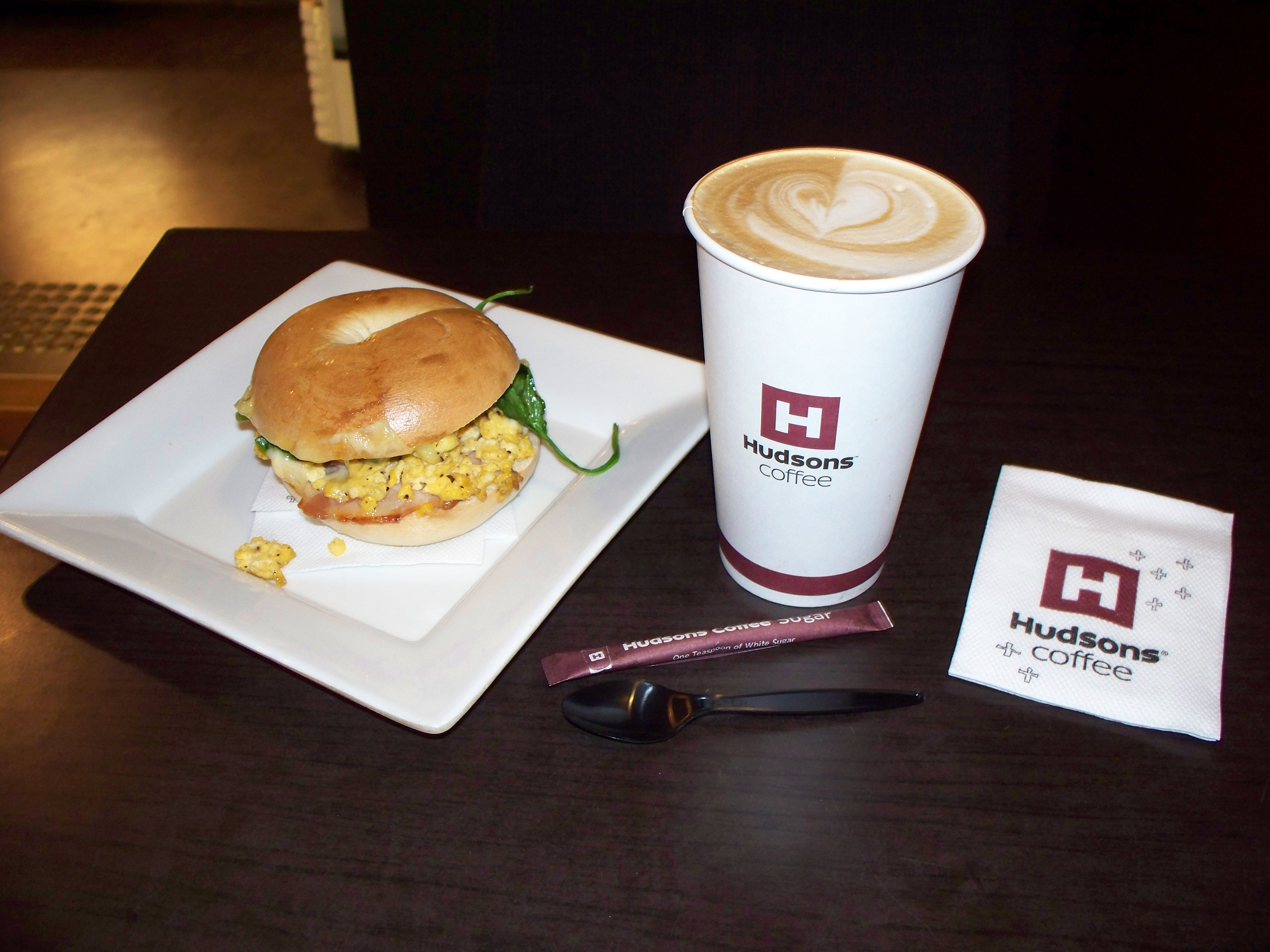
A Hudsons Coffee Gourmet Breakfast Bagel and Tall size latte. These "New York" style bagels were introduced nationwide in April 2013.

Hudsons Coffee serves mostly espresso-based beverages such as cappuccinos, caffè lattes, long and short macchiatos, long blacks, flat whites, mochas, as well as espresso. They also serve beverages other than coffee, such as hot chocolates and teas.

Amongst their cold drink selections are smoothies, iced coffees, chocolate and chai teas, and brand-name bottled drinks.

Food varies from store to store due to local suppliers, but will usually include a selection of cakes, pastries, and sandwiches.

In October 2010, Hudsons Coffee caused public debate when they introduced a milkshake spiked with four shots of espresso coffee called, Quad Shot Milkshakes. It contained 400mg of caffeine in each drink, sweetened by 30ml of vanilla syrup and two scoops of ice cream. The Australian Medical Association vice-president Steve Hambleton said, "six cups of coffee a day is considered the upper limit, but that's spread across the entire day. This is a lot of caffeine for one drink." Hudsons Coffee marketing director Rebecca Lowth said they were simply responding to customer demand, but warned, "we do not recommend the Quad Shot Milkshake or any beverage containing caffeine to children, pregnant women or people who may be sensitive to the effects of caffeine, such as those with heart conditions."

In July 2012, Hudsons Coffee announced all their milk-based drinks will be permeate free. Although there are no known health risks associated with the consumption of permeate, growing public concerns over the by-product has forced many milk producers (including Hudsons' supplier, National Foods), retailers, and cafés to cease adding it.

== Branding ==
Throughout Hudsons Coffee's operation, the chain has kept their outlets' colour scheme dark, maroon in colour, with wooden tables and panelling complementing the look. Since 2008, Hail Design was employed by the company to give its outlets a refresh which included a slightly updated logo supported by quirky hand-drawn illustrations on the walls, various products and packaging which Hail Design states, "help create a feeling of warmth, fun and energy." Since August 2012 that look stopped being rolled out to existing stores.

In February 2012, Emirates reopened its second Melbourne Airport T2 (international departures) Hudsons Coffee outlet with a radical new look, logo and slogan - 'A little love in every drop' - conceived by Hoyne Design. This outlet is being used by the company as a trial site for customer feedback and sales data as research showed public perception of the brand had dimmed in recent years in favour of independent cafés. Emirates have recently stated that they would like to grow the chain to at least 250 outlets domestically before expanding internationally, thus a redesign is necessary for this to be achieved. Hoyne Design says, "the rebrand embraces the spirit of independent cafés, moving away from pedestrian aesthetics associated with chains." It has been deemed a success as research since this store's reopening has shown customer feedback with 98 per cent approval and double digit sales growth. In June 2013, the company reopened its second refurbished outlet with Melbourne Airport T3 (Virgin Australia and Rex Airlines domestic departures). Since June 2013 when the Bondi Junction outlet first opened, all new locations carry the new look with the love heart logo.

== See also ==
- Coffeehouse
- List of coffeehouse chains
- Coffee
