= Blue Heaven =

Blue Heaven may refer to:

- Blue Heaven (1994 TV series), a British television sitcom
- Blue Heaven (2003 TV series), a Scottish television documentary series
- Blue Heaven (Keenan novel), a 1988 novel by Joe Keenan
- Blue Heaven (Box novel), a 2008 novel by C. J. Box
- Blue Heaven, a manga series by Tsutomu Takahashi
- Blue Heaven (flavour), Australian dessert topping

== See also ==
- My Blue Heaven (disambiguation)
