= Hudsons =

Hudsons may refer to

- Hudsons Coffee, an Australian chain of coffee retailers
- Hudson's, a defunct chain of retail department stores based in Detroit
