= Farmers Union (brand) =

South Australian food and drink brand

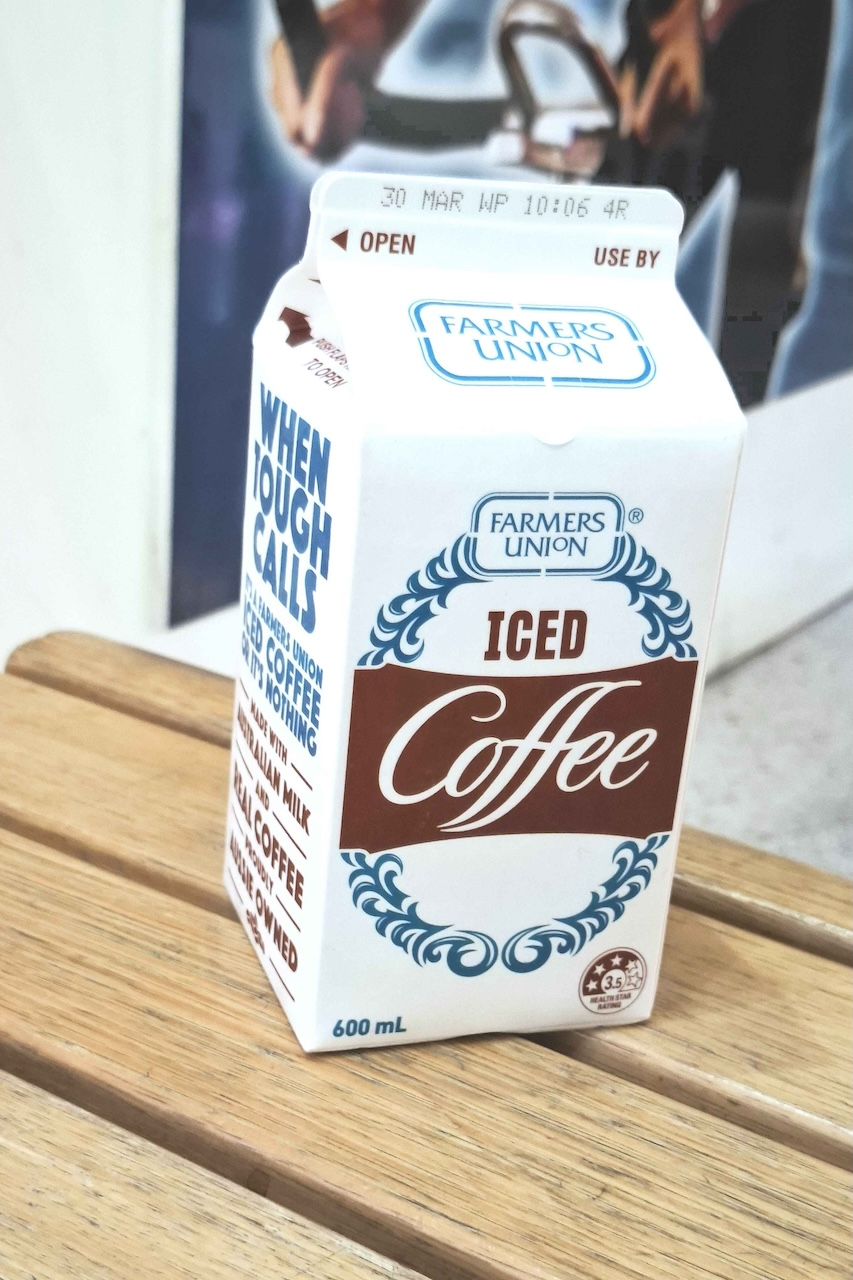
- Farmers Union Iced Coffee, a drink produced under the brand that has gained cult status in its state of origin, South Australia
- Current owner: Bega Dairy & Drinks
- Country: South Australia
- Markets: Oceania
- Previous owners: Kirin Company
- Tagline: "It's Farmers Union or Nothing"

Farmers Union is a brand name established by the South Australian Farmers' Co-operative Union Ltd (SAFU), and owned by Bega Cheese.

== Origins ==
=== Jamestown ===
At a meeting in Jamestown, South Australia on 28 February 1888, a committee formed to establish a grain "producers' union to combat the effects of depressed agricultural prices and the power of dealers". In October, John Pearce, Thomas Mitchell, Alex McCallum and others floated the "South Australian Farmers' (later Co-operative) Union Ltd" with a paid-up capital of under £300, ninety-four shareholders, John Pearce as managing director, Thomas Mitchell and Alex McCallum directors, and George Lake as secretary.

Pearce was elected chairman, and remained a director until 1902. His eldest son Edward James Pearce later became a director. Mitchell succeeded Pearce as chairman. Lake later became manager, and continued as secretary-manager until 1895.

In 1893 the union declared its first profit.

=== Adelaide ===
In 1895 the head office was transferred to Adelaide. A merchandise store was established at Port Adelaide, and business was diversified to include dealing in wheat-sacks, machinery and superphosphate. Mitchell died in 1908 after 20 years of leadership; his son Robert later became a director.

== Dairy industry ==
=== Yorke Peninsula ===
Dairying was for many years a thriving business with the South Australian Farmers' Union opening a factory in Stansbury in 1923. At its peak it produced 2,400 pounds of butter a week. Increasing wool prices saw cows being replaced by sheep: less labour-intensive sheep were providing a better return for farmers. The butter factory closed in 1951.

=== Murray lands ===
Irrigation settlements were established along the lower Murray River in the early 1900s, and a dairy industry developed. In 1922 the South Australian Farmers Union opened a factory in Murray Bridge. From 1919 to the mid-1940s the milk and cream was collected by small, fast and powerful boats; the South Australian Farmers Union operated a fleet which included the Loyalty, the Union, the Co-operation and the Progress.

== Competitors ==
Its main competitor in Adelaide was AMSCOL – the Adelaide Milk Supply Co-operative Limited. The company was taken over by the South Australian Farmers Union and Dairy Vale in 1978.

== Ownership ==
Farmers Union became part of the Adelaide Steamship Company, and was included in the public float of National Foods in 1991, which was subsequently acquired by Lion Nathan, which was subsequently acquired by Japan's Kirin in 2007. In November 2019 China's Mengniu Dairy purchased Lion Dairy from Kirin.

Bega Cheese announced on 26 November 2020 that it had agreed terms to purchase Lion Dairy & Drinks for $534 million. The sale was completed in January 2021.

== See also ==
- Farmers Union Iced Coffee
- South Australian food and drink
