= My Blue Heaven =

"My Blue Heaven" may refer to:

- My Blue Heaven (1950 film), starring Betty Grable
- My Blue Heaven (1990 American film), starring Steve Martin
- My Blue Heaven (1990 Dutch film)
- My Blue Heaven (album), a 1990 album by John Pizzarelli
- My Blue Heaven: The Best of Fats Domino, Volume 1, a 1990 compilation album by Fats Domino
- "My Blue Heaven" (song), a 1927 song covered by many artists
- "My Blue Heaven", a 2005 song by Taking Back Sunday from Louder Now

== See also ==
- Blue Heaven (disambiguation)
