= Iced coffee =

Coffee served chilled

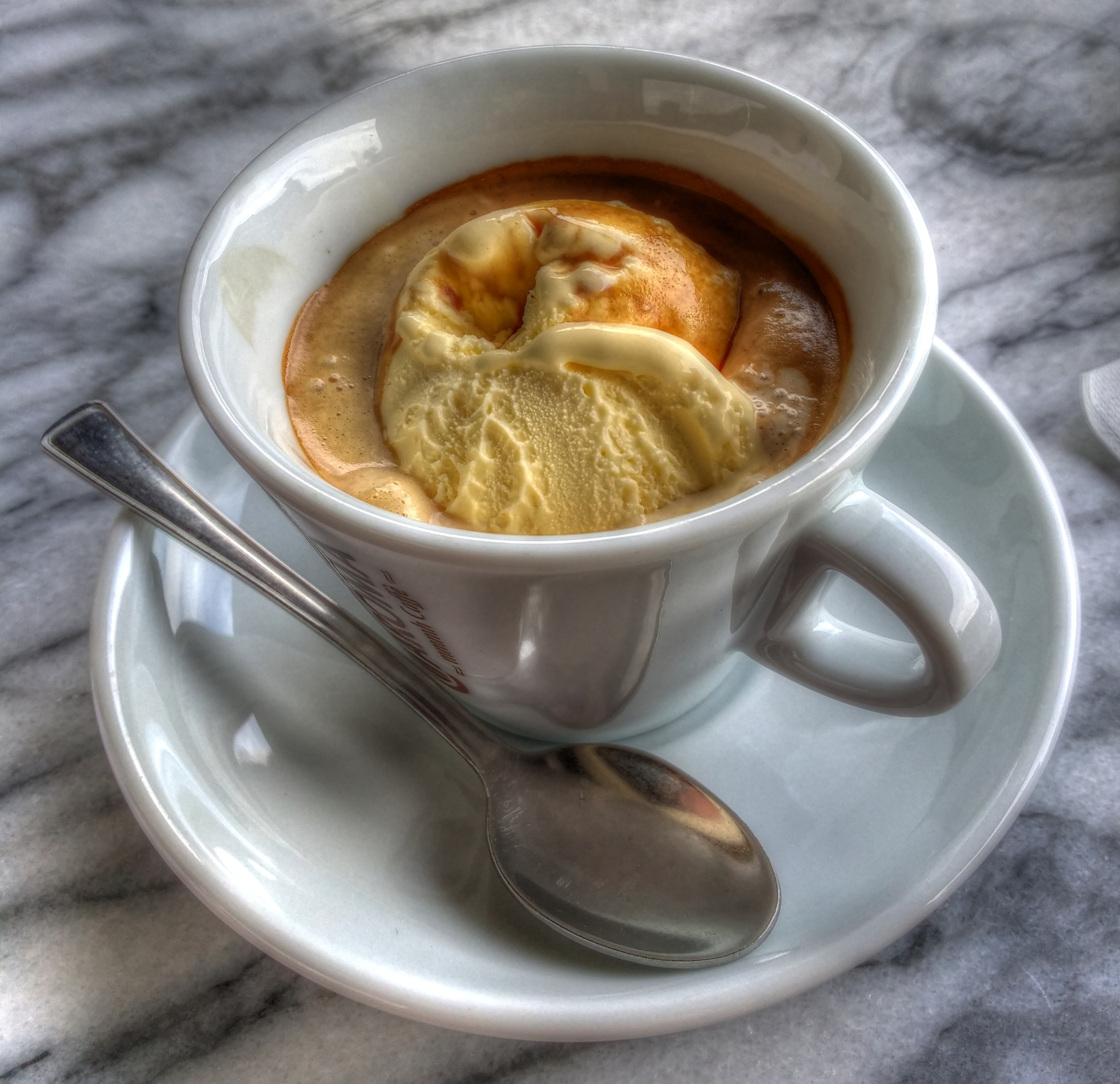
Italian affogato, a dessert comprising a scoop of gelato (ice cream), either fiordilatte (plain milk-flavored) or vanilla, topped with espresso coffee.

Iced coffee is coffee served cold. It may be prepared either by brewing coffee normally (i.e. carafe, French press, etc.) and then serving it over ice or with cold milk, or by brewing the coffee cold. In hot brewing, sweeteners and flavoring may be added before cooling, as they dissolve faster. Iced coffee can also be sweetened with pre-dissolved sugar in water.

Iced coffee is regularly available in most coffee shops. Iced coffee is generally brewed at a higher strength than normal coffee, to compensate for dilution by melting ice. Iced coffee is made by brewing hot coffee, and pouring it over ice; cold brew coffee is made without heat by steeping coffee grounds into lukewarm water.

In Australia, packaged iced coffee with milk and sweetener is widely distributed.

== History ==
Mazagran, a cold, sweetened coffee beverage that originated in Algeria around 1840, has been described by locals as "the original iced coffee". It was prepared with coffee syrup and cold water.

Frozen coffee beverages, similar to slush, are documented in the 19th century. The Italian granita al caffè is a similar beverage.

"Iced coffee"—coffee that has been brewed and then chilled with ice—appeared in menus and recipes in the late 19th century.

Iced coffee was popularized by a marketing campaign of the Joint Coffee Trade Publicity Committee of the United States in 1920. Much later, it was marketed by chain outlets, including Burger King, McDonald's, Dunkin' Donuts and Starbucks.

== Variations by country ==
=== Australia ===
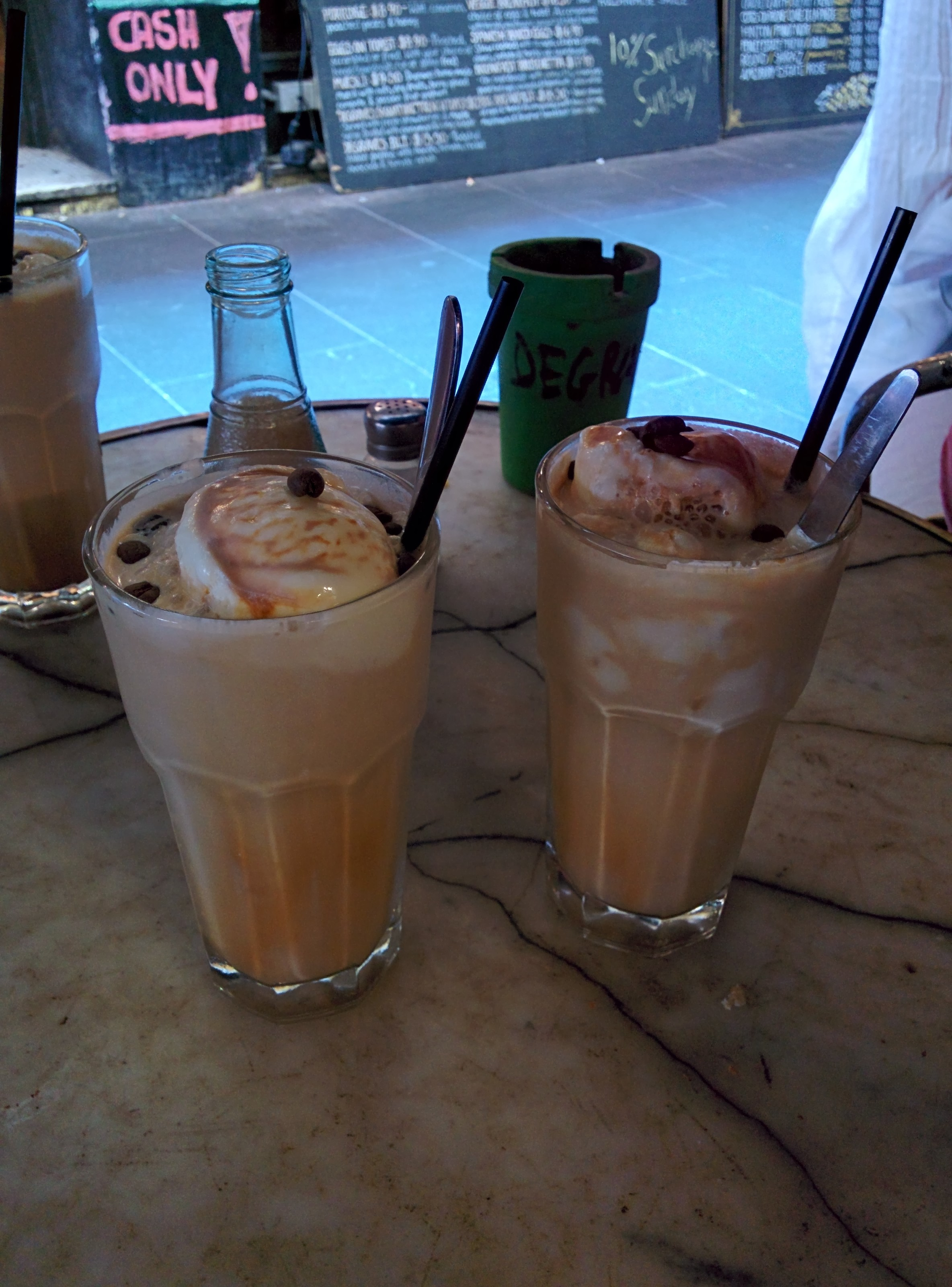
Australian iced coffee served with ice-cream and coffee beans

In Australia, iced coffee may include syrup, cream, cocoa powder or coffee beans. The café style is something like an unblended milkshake, and may be made from espresso coffee or only coffee flavoring. Bushells has marketed a Coffee and Chicory Essence since the late 19th century, as has Bickfords since 1910.

There are many brands of packaged iced coffee consisting of coffee, milk, and sweetener. In South Australia, Farmers Union Iced Coffee has outsold Coca-Cola and is one of the state's biggest brands. Pauls "Territory's Own" Iced Coffee is popular in the Northern Territory and Norco Real Iced Coffee is prominent in Northern New South Wales and South East Queensland. Other brands include Breaka, Big M, Brownes Chill, Moove, Masters, Dare, Max, Fleurieu, Rush, Oak and Ice Break.

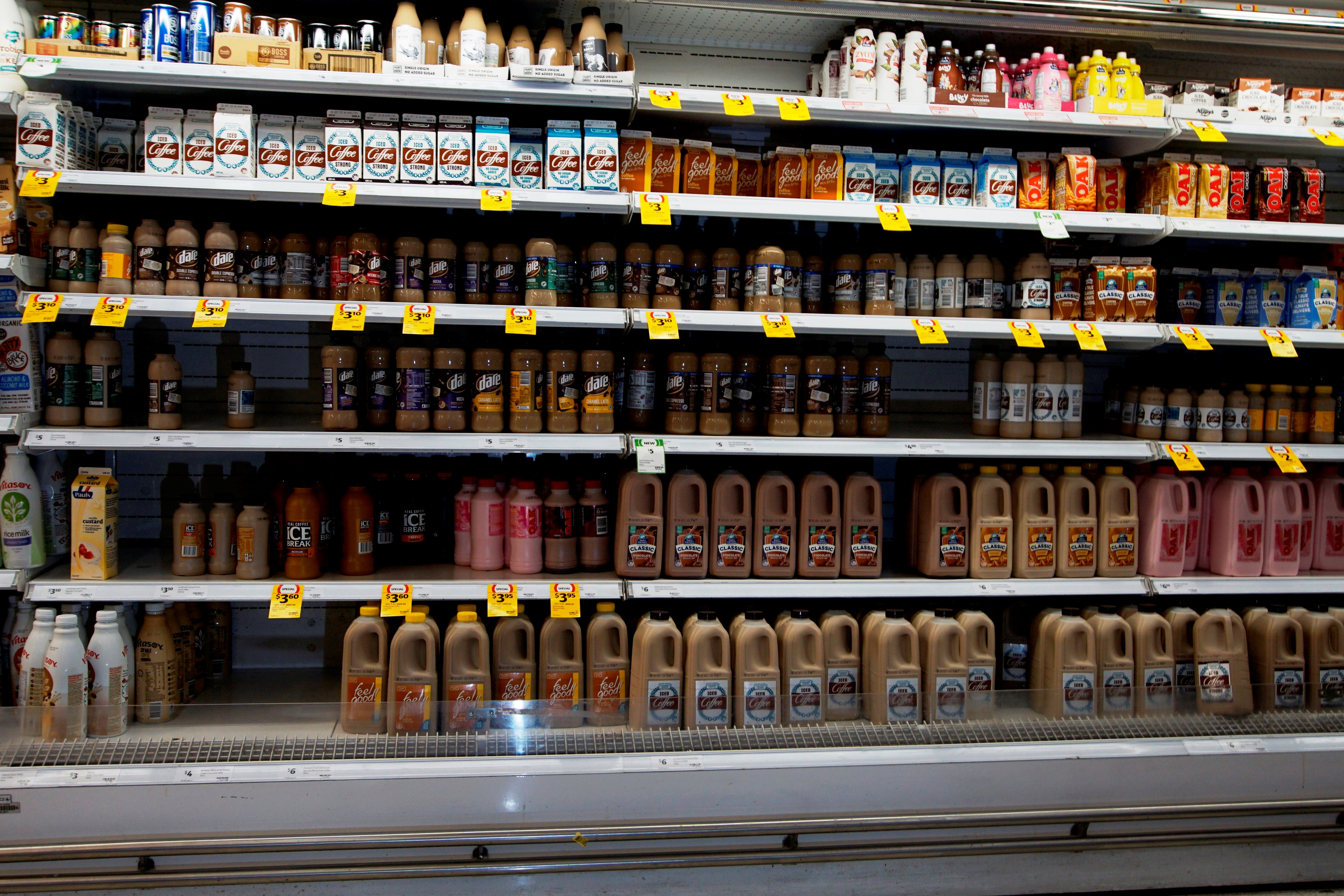
Packaged iced coffee in Australia

=== Canada ===
In Canada, many fast-food and beverage chains sell iced coffee. The popular Tim Hortons coffee chain sells iced cappuccinos known as Iced Capps and recently introduced standard iced coffee to its Canadian menu in addition to its U.S. menu. The popularity of iced coffee drinks increased by about 16 percent between 2015 and 2016.

=== Chile ===
In Chile, iced coffee is called café helado (iced coffee) and is popular in the summer. Café helado is composed of espresso or coffee powder. Ice cream is added to the coffee, as are sugary additives such as vanilla, cinnamon, or dulce de leche. Iced coffee is served during the summer at breakfast and at parties. Chilean iced coffee may be topped with whipped cream and chopped nuts.

=== Germany ===
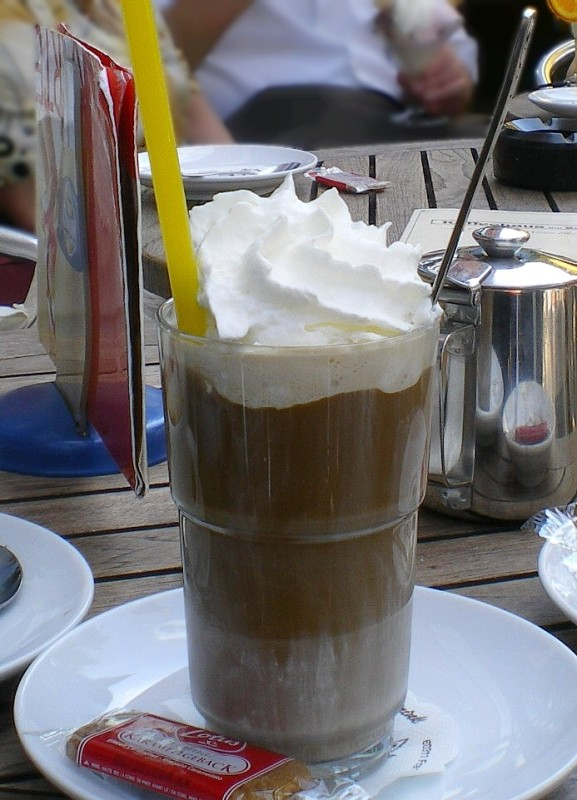
German Eiskaffee with whipped cream

In Germany, there are different types of Eiskaffee (coffee with ice cream). The most widespread form includes milk and sweeteners, and is served in coffeehouses and in Eisdielen (ice cream parlours). It consists of filtered, hot brewed and cooled coffee with vanilla ice cream and whipped cream on top. In supermarkets, the most common canned version includes flavors such as cappuccino and espresso. This iced coffee is very similar to the canned iced coffee in the UK and in the case of some brands (particularly Nestlé) actually the same product.

=== Greece ===
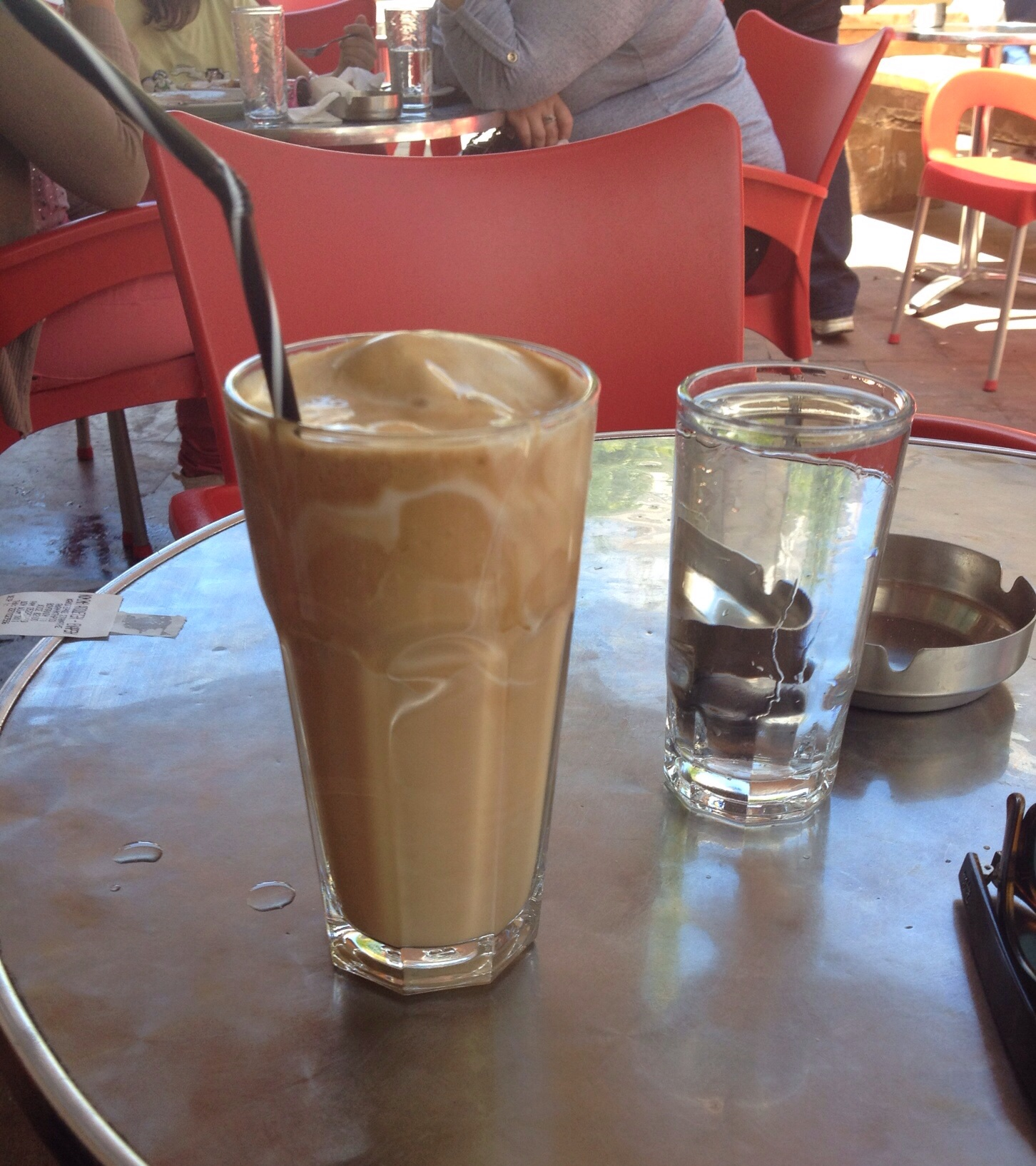
Greek frappé iced coffee

In Greece, the most popular iced coffee beverage is frappé, made of instant coffee (generally Nescafe), water, and optionally, sugar using either an electric mixer or a shaker to create foam. Ice cubes and, optionally, milk are added. Frappés became known outside of Greece as a result of the 2004 Summer Olympics in Athens. Frappés have become very popular in Cyprus and Romania.

The second most popular iced coffee beverage in Greece is the freddo cappuccino which is topped with a cold milk foam known as afrógala (Greek: αφρόγαλα) and freddo espresso which is a double shot of espresso blended with ice cubes and served over ice.

=== Italy ===
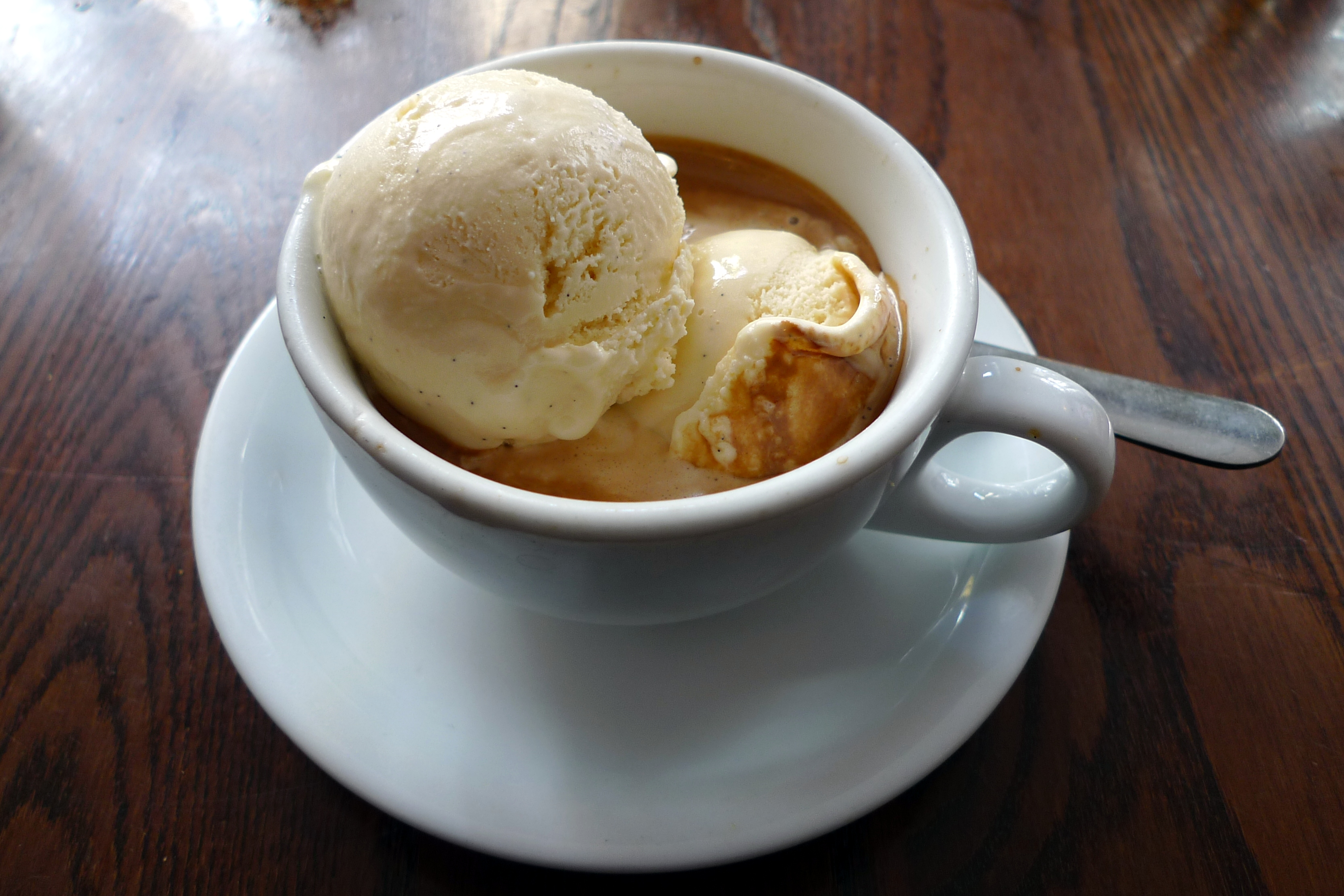
Italian affogato

In Italy, the Nestlé company introduced Frappé coffee under its Nescafé Red Cup line, with the name Red Cup Iced Coffee. Many Italian coffee bars serve "caffè freddo", which is straight espresso kept in a freezer and served as icy slush. In the Salento region of Apulia, this was perfected by brewing the espresso freshly, adding the desired amount of sugar or almond milk and finally pouring it into a whiskey glass filled with ice cubes right before being served, known as caffè in ghiaccio, or coffee in ice. Affogato (espresso poured over a scoop of vanilla gelato or ice cream) is also served, typically as a dessert.

Capsule-based coffee systems have expanded to include iced coffee and frappé-style options, as seen in the Nescafé Dolce Gusto Iced Frappé capsules available in Europe.

=== Japan ===
Japanese iced coffee

In Japan, iced coffee (アイスコーヒー, aisu kōhī) has been drunk since the Taishō period (around the 1920s) in coffeehouses. It is served with gum syrup and milk. Cold tea was already popular, so it was natural to drink cold coffee. Cold brew coffee is also common in Japan, where it is known as Dutch coffee (ダッチ・コーヒー, dacchi kōhī), due to the historical Dutch coffee trade from Indonesia. In 1969, UCC Ueshima Coffee released canned coffee, which made coffee available everywhere. Today, canned liquid coffee is consumed both cold and hot.

Some Japanese iced coffee is prepared by brewing the coffee with hot water and allowing the coffee to drip over ice cubes. The volume of hot water is reduced to account for the dilution of the coffee by the melting ice. This method produces results similar to other iced coffees but is comparable to brewing hot coffee in time and effort.

=== New Zealand ===
In New Zealand, iced coffee is popular and served in a number of cafes. It is often served with vanilla ice-cream or whipped cream.

=== Thailand ===
Thai iced coffee is brewed using strong black coffee, sweetened with sugar, heavy cream (or half-and-half) and cardamom, and quickly cooled and served over ice. Some variations are brewed using espresso. Thai iced coffee can be served with whipped cream on top for a layered effect and garnished with cinnamon, vanilla or anise. It is a common menu item at Thai restaurants.

=== United States ===
Iced Latte

Iced coffee is prepared many different ways in the US, including cold-brew coffee and chilled conventional coffee.

Iced coffee can be made from cold-brew coffee, for which coffee grounds are soaked for several hours and then strained. The next day, the grounds get filtered out. The result is a very strong coffee concentrate that is usually mixed with milk and sweetened.

Many coffee retailers simply use hot-brewed coffee in their iced coffee drinks. Starbucks specifically uses the double-strength method in which the coffee is brewed hot with twice the amount of grounds. With this method, the melted ice does not dilute the strength and flavor of the coffee. Unlike the cold-brew process, this method does not eliminate the acidity inherent in hot-brewed coffee.

=== Vietnam ===
In Vietnam, iced coffee (Vietnamese: cà phê đá, lit. 'iced coffee') is a traditional Vietnamese coffee recipe. It is created using coffee roasted between medium and dark. The drink is made by passing hot water through the grounds into a cup that already contains condensed milk. To serve the drink cold, ice is added to the cup.

Variations involve additions of ice, sugar or condensed milk. A popular variation is cà phê sữa đá (or nâu đá in the North), which is iced coffee served with sweetened condensed milk. This is done by putting two to three teaspoons or more of condensed milk into the cup prior to the drip filter process.

== See also ==
- Café liégeois
- List of coffee drinks
- Mazagran (coffee beverage)
