= Blue Heaven (flavour) =

Australian milkshake style

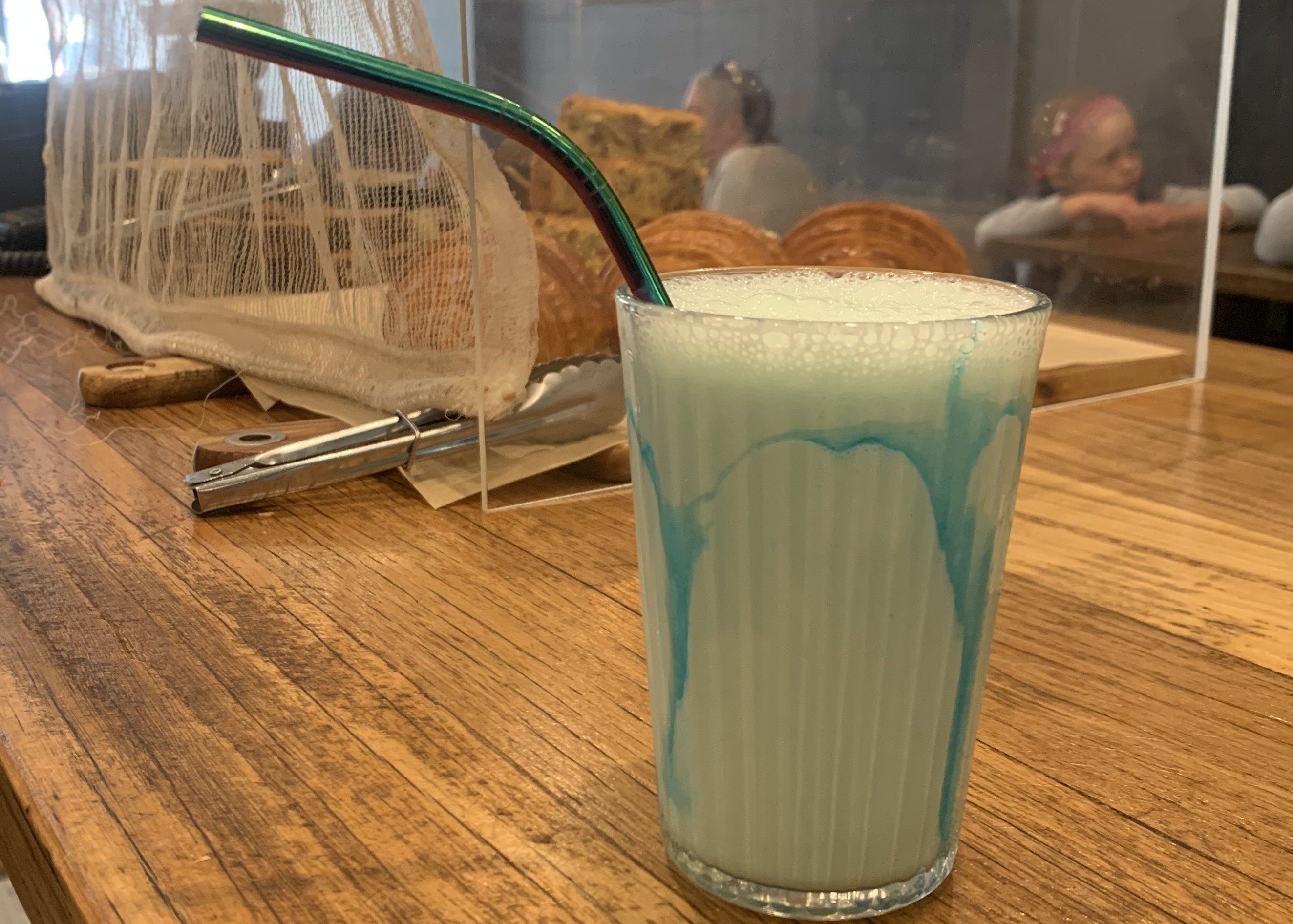
Blue Heaven in a milkshake

Blue Heaven is a milkshake and topping flavour sold primarily in Australia. It is blue in colour, and its taste is most commonly described as a mix of vanilla and raspberry, although its exact flavour is not fixed and varies between manufacturers and products. Sometimes it is marketed as a "Blue Moon" milkshake.

== Origins ==
The origins of the flavour are unclear, and no confirmed appearance of a "Blue Heaven" milkshake on Australian menus before the 1950s has been located. The bright blue colouring used, brilliant blue FCF, was first synthesised in 1929.

It is thought that the name of the flavour may have originated in the 1928 song, My Blue Heaven, coinciding with the creation of the colour, however there is lacking evidence of the milkshake's presence on menus around Australia at the time. Others theorise it might have been first made in the 1950s, sometime after the release of 1950 film My Blue Heaven starring Betty Grable. The evidence for either theory is scant.

Separately, "Blue Heaven" has a longer history in Australia as the name of a blue curaçao-based cocktail. A 1989 feature in The Canberra Times recalled Australians drinking "Blue Heavens, Blue Moons and Blue Lagoons" made with blue curaçao since the 1930s and 1940s. A Blue Heaven cocktail (blue curaçao, amaretto, rum and pineapple juice) remains recognised today. Whether this earlier drink-naming convention influenced the milkshake flavour's name has not been established, and no source directly connects the two.

== Commercial availability ==
Blue Heaven milkshake and flavour syrup from a beachside Kiosk in Semaphore, South Australia.

Krispy Kreme Australia sells a Blue Heaven milkshake, describing its flavoured syrup as a "vanilla/raspberry combination" blended with milk and ice cream. It can also be found at many traditional Australian ice cream kiosks.

Bulla has released Blue Heaven as a limited-edition ice cream flavour more than once. A "Blue Heaven Crunch" ice-cream stick, released alongside a Pineapple variant, was reported by trade press in November 2018. An earlier Bulla "ice cream on a stick" sold under the Blue Heaven name was, in fact, pineapple-flavoured. This indicates that the name is not tied to one fixed flavour combination across manufacturers.

In 2021, and again in 2023, Big M, the Victorian flavoured-milk brand owned by the Bega Group, released a limited edition Blue Heaven flavoured milk in the state of Victoria. Its 2021 release became the best-selling new flavoured-milk product in Victoria that year, overtaking Big M's regular Strawberry flavour in sales, and it was reissued again in 2023.

Blue Heaven has appeared as a flavour in the Aeroplane Jelly range at times.
