= Dairy Farmers Pty Ltd =

Australian company producing dairy products

- Industry: Food
- Founded: 15 January 1900; 126 years ago
- Founder: Dairy Farmers Co-operative Milk Company
- Headquarters: Docklands, Melbourne, Victoria, Australia
- Area served: Australia
- Products: Dairy
- Owner: Bega Cheese
- Parent: Bega Dairy & Drinks
- Website: www.dairyfarmers.com.au

Dairy Farmers Pty Ltd is an Australian dairy brand whose products are distributed mainly in New South Wales and Queensland. Established in 1900, Dairy Farmers’ parent company is Australian-owned Bega Group. The core products sold under the Dairy Farmers brand are fresh milk (in New South Wales and Queensland only) and UHT "long-life" milk (Australia wide), as well as various other dairy goods. It supplies products to local and international markets such as Eastern Europe, the Middle East and Asia.

Kirin Holdings Company Limited of Japan, via its subsidiary National Foods, acquired the company in November 2008, and renamed "National Foods" as "Lion Dairy & Drinks" the following year.

On 23 November 2020, a deal was announced that would allow Bega Cheese to buy Lion Dairy & Drinks, and all subsidiaries, including Dairy Farmers.

== History ==
On 15 January 1900, the Dairy Farmers Co-operative Milk Co. Limited was created by 65 stakeholders, most being dairy farmers in the Illawarra region of New South Wales. The aim of the co-operative was to market their milk and butter products effectively to city customers. Dairy Farmers was 100% Australian owned by Australian dairy farmers for 107 years, and ultimately had 11 processing facilities. In 2005, Dairy Farmers had the third-highest dairy sales in Australia, with Norco Co-operative second and National Foods, under its brand "Pura", first.

In 2008, Dairy Farmers was acquired by Kirin Holdings (Australia) Pty Ltd, part of the Kirin Group of Japan, and became a 'brand' of National Foods, which Kirin has bought the previous year, ending 108 years as a co-operative company. After Kirin Holdings acquired the alcoholic beverage company, Lion Nathan, in 2009, National Foods & Lion Nathan were merged to become "Lion Nathan National Foods". Lion Nathan National Foods became Lion and Lion Dairy & Drinks in 2011.

Dairy Farmers' head office was located in Homebush Bay, Sydney until 2008. Lion Dairy & Drinks has its head office is in Melbourne, but LD&D's parent, Lion, has its corporate head office in Sydney.

In November 2019, China's Mengniu Dairy announced the purchase of Dairy Farmers’ parent company Lion Dairy & Drinks from Kirin, for approximately A$600 million (US$407 million). ACCC gave clearance on 20 February 2020, but it still needed FIRB approval. On 25 August 2020, it was announced that Kirin and Mengniu had decided to cancel the sale because rising geopolitical tensions between Australia and China meant it was unlikely approval from Australian regulators would materialise.

On 23 November 2020, it was announced that Bega Cheese would purchase Lion Dairy & Drinks, and all subsidiaries including Dairy Farmers for a reported A$550 million. This would make Dairy Farmers Australian-owned for the first time since 2008.

== Brands ==
Dairy Farmers brand is mainly used for fresh milk (in NSW and Queensland), UHT "long-life" milk (Australia wide), "Thick & Creamy" yoghurt, and desserts, creams, custard and buttermilk.

Dairy Farmers produced the "Ski" yoghurt range (its main competitor being Yoplait) under licence from brand owner Nestlé, but after the company was acquired by National Foods (Kirin Holdings) in 2008, Fonterra purchased the "Ski" brand (still under licence from Nestlé), with the brand name changing to "Nestlé Ski" in 2012. In 2016 Fonterra divested its yoghurt range, which includes "Nestlé Ski" and "Nestlé Soleil", selling it to Parmalat.

As a company (prior to 2009), Dairy Farmers marketed a number of brands: a selection of milk, yogurt, cheese, cream, custard and flavoured milk varieties, sold under the main brand. The company had 11 processing plants in Australia, including at Wetherill Park in Sydney.

== Locations ==
Factories carrying the "Dairy Farmers" brand) are located at:

- NSW: 2257 Castlereagh Rd, Penrith, New South Wales.
- QLD: 64-72 Magnesium Dve, Crestmead, Queensland.

These sites are also the locations printed on the back of all fresh milk bottles in New South Wales and Queensland respectively.

== Company milestones ==
- 1900 – Company established (The Dairy Farmers Co-operative Milk Co. Limited)
- 1935 – Established first bottling plant in Sydney
- Mid-1960s – Began producing cottage cheese and flavoured yogurts
- 1977 – Invested in Ultra High Temperature (UHT) production
- 1989 – Acquisitions and mergers saw the formation of, Australian Co-operative Foods (ACF), to be known as Dairy Farmers
- 1993 – Acquired Dairy Vale (SA), Midland Milk (Vic), Malanda Co-operative (FNQ), and Queensco-Unity Dairyfoods Co-operative (SEQ)
- 1997 – Acquired the COON, Mil Lel and Fred Walker cheese brands, and the licence for the Cracker Barrel brand. Merged with Malanda Dairy Foods and integrated the Dairy Vale business
- 2005 – Restructured and refocused the company. Separated the FMCG business from the milk supply co-operative
- 2008 – Acquired by Japanese-owned food and beverage company Kirin Holdings. Dairy Farmers' became a brand of National Foods.
- 2009 – National Foods became Lion Nathan National Foods, after Kirin Co. Ltd acquired 100% of Lion.
- 2011 – Lion Nathan National Foods separated into two new divisions, "Lion" and "Lion Dairy & Drinks" (LD&D Milk Pty Ltd and LD&D Foods Pty Ltd), with head offices in Sydney & Melbourne respectively.
- 2020 – Acquired by Bega Group

== See also ==
- Dairy farming in Australia
