= Farmers Union Iced Coffee =

Flavoured milk drink

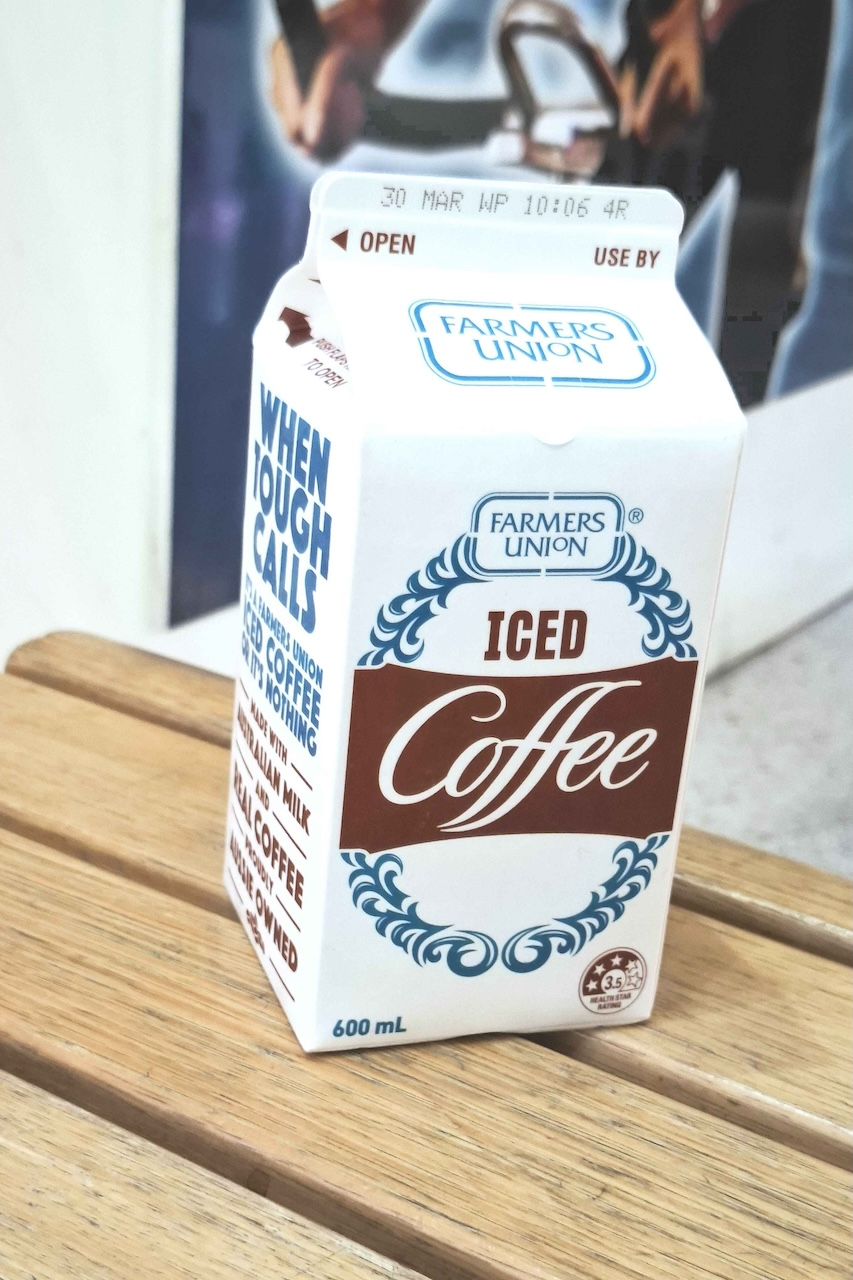
- 2026 design of Farmers Union Iced Coffee
- Type: Milk beverage
- Manufacturer: Bega Group
- Origin: Australia
- Introduced: 1977
- Flavour: Coffee
- Variants: Farmers Union Iced Coffee Regular, Farmers Union Iced Coffee Strong, Farmers Union Iced Coffee ONE, Farmers Union Iced Coffee EDGE.

Farmers Union Iced Coffee is a coffee milk flavoured milk drink popular in Australia, primarily the state of South Australia. It continues to be sold under the Farmers Union banner, originally a South Australian co-operative, subsequently the listed company National Foods, and then by a series of subsidiaries of the Japanese brewing company Kirin. The current manufacturer's company name is Bega Dairy & Drinks.

Its historic New South Wales equivalent is Oak Milk's Classic Iced Coffee flavour, which has an Iced Coffee flavour packaged in a similar carton.

== Launch ==
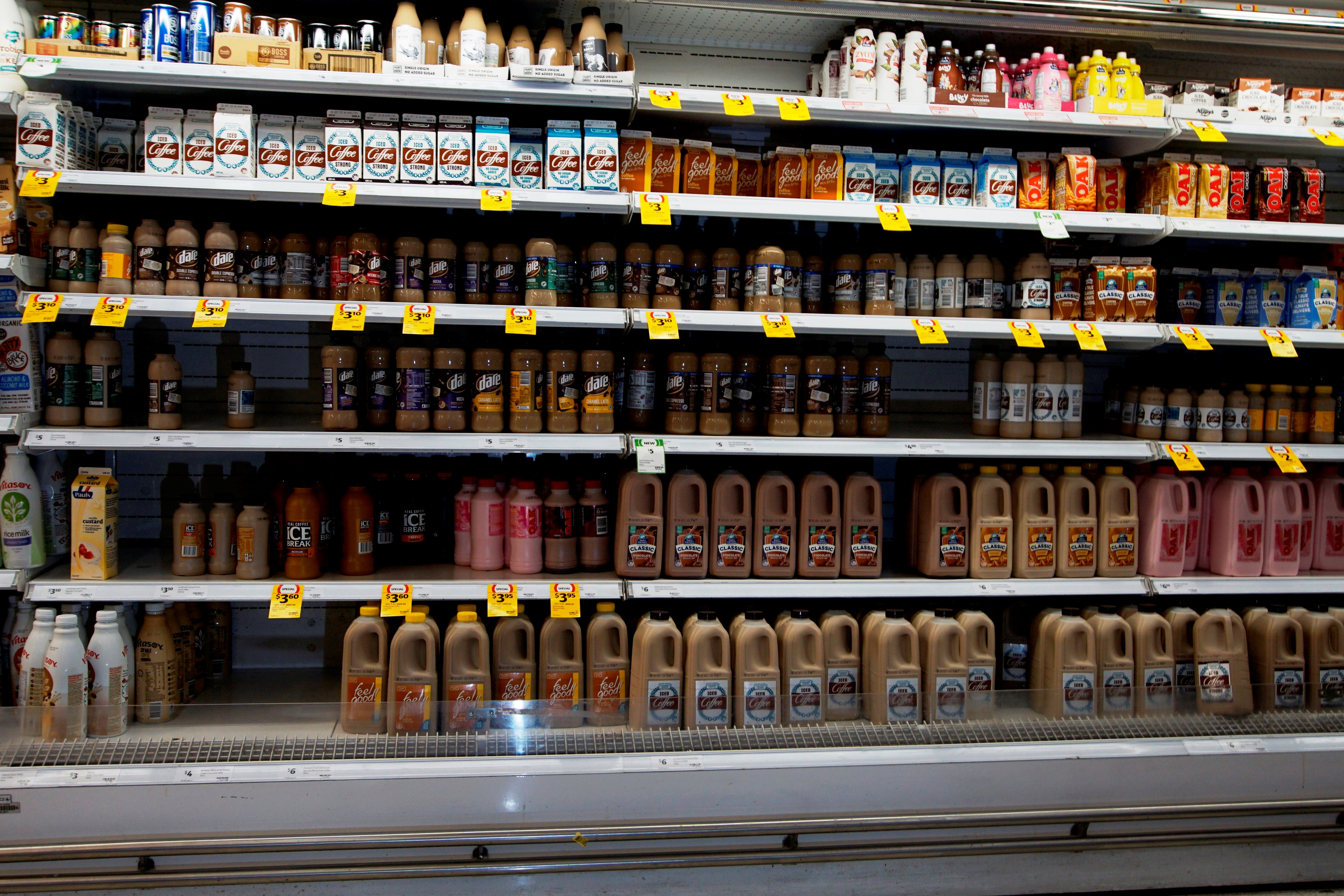
"Iced coffee" varieties

First launched in 1977 when Farmers Union was a co-operative of South Australian dairy farmers, the brand has achieved iconic status in South Australia and is now also available in all other Australian states and territories. Branded as “iced coffee”, the coffee milk drink is made with coffee, glucose, and homogenised reduced fat milk and milk solids. In the past Farmers Union Iced Coffee's labelling also made mention of "iced confection" as an ingredient. The flavour of the product changed considerably when this ingredient was removed. The product is available predominantly in 600 mL and smaller 375 mL cardboard cartons. However, the 375 mL cartons were changed in 2019 to 300 mL bottles, much like the “Stubby” style of the 750 mL bottles. The standard 600 mL cartons remain the same. It is also sold in 2 litre plastic cartons and 500 mL bottles. It was also sold in 3 litre plastic cartons up until 2017 and 1 litre cardboard cartons up until 2013.

In 2003, Australians consumed in excess of 22 million litres, making it Australia's best selling flavoured milk drink/milk shake at that time.

Responding to demand, the drink holders of the locally made third generation Mitsubishi Magna and first generation of the Holden Cruze were designed to hold both normal round drinks and Farmers Union Iced Coffee cartons.

Many other companies have joined in competition throughout Australia, with a multitude of recipes, packaging styles and sizes.

== Commercials ==
Farmers Union Iced Coffee in Australia also enjoys a high profile for popular commercials featuring rough male workers acting out ballet with heavy machinery in order to take up their boss on his word that he would provide them with a truck load of Iced Coffee if all his workers took up ballet. Another well-known run of advertisements features a dramatic voice-over detailing world headlines and issues, but shows very low-key average Australian equivalents on screen. These include:

- "When the wall came down" - depicts two men demolishing a wall as part of a DIY project. This relates to when the Berlin Wall was demolished.
- "Survived the Apollo Disaster" - shows three motorists (one consuming Iced Coffee) as their Holden Apollo is towed away after an accident. This may refer to one of two major incidents involving Apollo spacecraft—either the Apollo 1 fire, in which three astronauts died during a launch-pad test exercise, or the Apollo 13 explosion, which scuttled a planned lunar landing but saw the three astronauts safely return to Earth.
- "There when the bras were burnt" - shows an absent minded male watching television as a bra is burnt by an iron in the foreground. This refers to the famous act of female liberation.
- "When Chisel broke up" - shows a construction site with a devastated builder holding two pieces of a broken chisel. Refers to when the band, Cold Chisel broke up.
- "Saw Cathy in Sydney in 2000" - shows one male supposedly meeting with an old friend in Sydney who is also named Cathy. Relates to Cathy Freeman winning the 400 m in the Sydney Olympics.
- "The Children Overboard" - shows two males in a speedboat talking as their children have fallen off the back in an inflatable that is being towed. Refers to the scandal when the Howard government falsely claimed that children were thrown overboard from a boat full of asylum seekers.
- "Lived through the Millennium Bug" - shows a man in a dinner suit in a sleeping bag drink an Iced Coffee while slapping a bug on his neck. Relates to the Y2K bug.
- "...and Trevor's Underarm" - shows two construction workers both drinking Iced Coffee; one lifts his arm revealing his body odour and the other recoils in disgust. Refers to Trevor Chappell's infamous underarm delivery on the last ball of a One Day Cricket International. Features actor Terry Rogers in an early role.
- "Strongly opposed the Bush Invasion" - shows a man cutting his neighbours overhanging bushes. Relates to the opposition of George Bush leading the invasion into Iraq.

== New flavours ==
On 23 October 2006, two new flavours of Farmers Union Iced Coffee were released in South Australia. Farmers Union Strong Iced Coffee which features a stronger coffee blend, which subsequently began sale in Tasmania, and Farmers Union Light Iced Coffee, which has no added sugar (where aspartame is added as a substitute) and a taste similar to the original.

According to the company, both the original variety and the Light flavours contain approximately 18 mg of caffeine per 100 mL, while the Farmers Union Strong Iced Coffee contains 24 mg. By comparison, Dare ice coffee claims 16 mg and its blue label (double espresso, no added sugar) 32 mg.

The Light Iced Coffee proved to be rather unpopular, as many consumers did not like the slightly weaker taste and instead chose the original. In August 2011, the company released a new product, Farmers Union Iced Coffee "One", claiming that "One" had "100% taste, 1% fat and no added sugar", and was a completely new formulation. "One" was not overly popular at launch, given the reputation of the Light Iced Coffee, leading to a huge promotion in December 2011, where customers who 'liked' the On the Run Facebook page could print a coupon from the internet, and redeem one of 10,000 free Iced Coffee "One"s from any petrol station or convenience outlet in South Australia.

== In popular culture ==
Farmers Union Iced Coffee features in the 2023 film Emotion Is Dead, written and directed by Pete Williams.

== See also ==
- Farmers Union (brand)
- South Australian food and drink
