= Dare (flavoured milk) =

Australian brand of flavoured milk

- Logo used since 2026

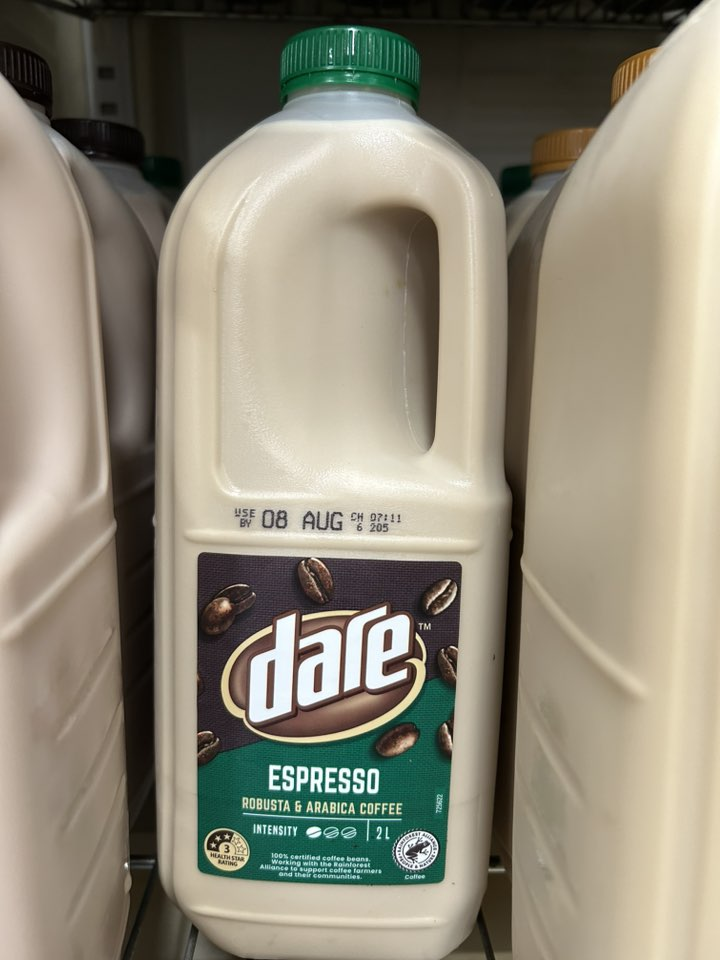
- Espresso flavoured Dare Iced Coffee, in a 2L plastic milk container
- Manufacturer: Bega Dairy & Drinks
- Origin: Melbourne, Australia
- Introduced: 1996
- Related products: Farmer's Union Iced Coffee, Boss Coffee, Oak (flavoured milk)
- Website: dareicedcoffee.com.au

Dare (also marketed as Dare Iced Coffee) is a brand of coffee milk flavoured milk produced in Australia by Bega Dairy & Drinks, a subsidiary of the Bega Group. Originally launched in 1996, the brand is a major participant in the Australian ready-to-drink (RTD) coffee and canned coffee market.

The brand is characterised by its "A Dare Fix'll Fix It" advertising slogan, a long-running marketing campaign that positions the product as a solution for "brain fade" or lack of concentration.

== History ==
The brand was first launched in 1996 in Melbourne, Victoria. Initially a smaller brand within the dairy portfolio of National Foods, it spent its first decade as a regional competitor to more established flavoured milks, particularly the South Australian Farmer's Union Iced Coffee. The brand underwent a significant strategic relaunch in 2009, which shifted its focus toward a younger, predominantly "blue-collar" demographic, with high-caffeine formulations in its marketing. In 2026 a new variety of double espresso was introduced, advertised as "30 g [per 500ml serve] protein added".

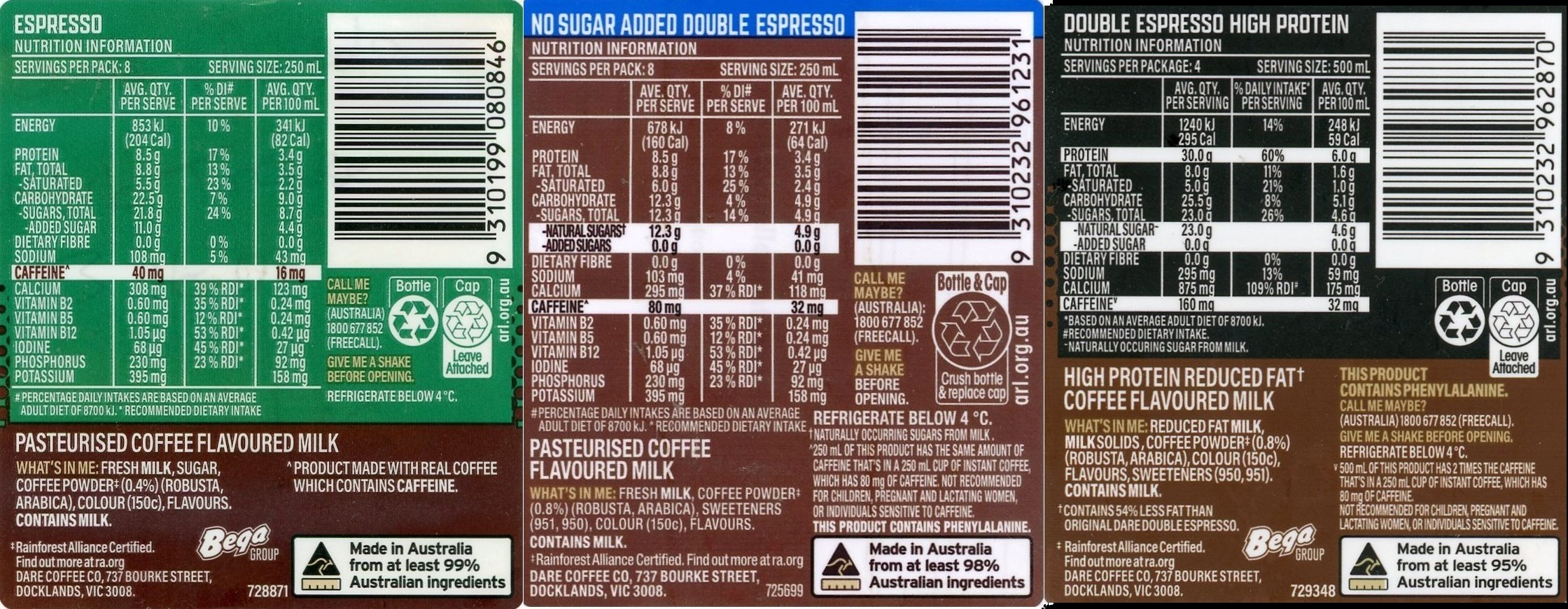
Contents comparison (note doubled serve size)

== Dare Charged ==
While Dare held a long-standing position as the national market leader by volume in the iced coffee segment, recent industry data indicates significant competition from Suntory's Boss Coffee, which captured over 50% of the Australian RTD coffee market share by early 2025. In April 2025 when Bega released Dare Charged, a stronger version of its original iced coffee in a 240ml can as a direct domestic competitor to Suntory Boss' dominance in the Australian market.

== "Daremergency Correction" controversy ==
In February 2025, the brand faced a significant public relations challenge following a technical error in its "Daremergency" promotional campaign. Hundreds of participants were mistakenly sent email, falsely informing them they had won a $1,000 prepaid Mastercard. Several hours later, parent company Bega Group issued a retraction email, labelled a "Daremergency Correction", which led to consumer backlash and coverage by national news outlets like Nine News. The blunder was further highlighted by competitors like Nedd's Milk, who used the incident for guerrilla marketing by offering their own products to "unlucky losers" as a way to "show some care."
