= Big M =

Brand name of flavoured milk

- Big M logo
- Type: Flavoured milk
- Manufacturer: Bega Dairy & Drinks
- Origin: Victoria, Australia
- Introduced: 1978
- Flavour: Multiple
- Variants: Original Chocolate; Bigger Chocolate; Strawberry; Iced Coffee; Banana; Egg Flip; Cookies and Cream; Fruity Mix

Big M is a brand of flavoured milk that was founded in Victoria, Australia, in 1977. It was launched by the Hawthorn-based and newly formed Victorian Dairy Industry Authority (VDIA), which replaced the more regulatory-oriented Victorian Milk Board. In November 2020, Australian company Bega Cheese purchased Lion Dairy & Drinks from Japan's Kirin Holdings, acquiring Big M and other notable brands from the Japanese entity. This acquisition followed an earlier attempt made by Mengniu Dairy to acquire the brand in November 2019, which was rejected by the Foreign Investment Review Board.

== History ==
Victoria's Minister of Agriculture Ian Smith appointed Des Cooper (MD of the Victorian Oat Growers Pool) as chairman, and Brian Purtell as general manager of dairy company National Foods. Purtell appointed agricultural-science graduate Peter Granger as Marketing Manager. Granger conceived the VDIA Marketing Plan to introduce branding and promotion to both flavoured milk (Big M) and reduced-fat milk (Rev), and this was embraced by the board. Until this time there had been dozens of small 'zoned' dairies, some selling generic flavoured milks. With the exception of Ducats dairy in Shepparton, sales were minuscule. Ducats faced genuine competition from Midland Dairies, and this acted as a catalyst for innovation by both dairies.

Zoning had stifled dairy innovation elsewhere. Attempting to overcome this the Victorian Milk Board had introduced a reduced-fat milk in the mid 1970s called 2:10 The product failed due to lack of co-operation by dairy processors, and the inability of the Board to overcome this resistance. It was one of the reasons the Milk Board was subsequently replaced by the VDIA. Similarly, there was resistance to the launch of Big M and Rev, but it was ultimately embraced by the industry following consumer interest and demand the advertising and promotion generated.

Granger was principally the creative input, with Cooper and Purtell administrators who skilfully manoeuvred the launch in the face of industry reluctance and scepticism. The advertising agency George Paterson handled the advertising campaign. They conceived the brand name and contracted Paddington Films to produce the highly successful Big M surfing ads. This was a rare occasion where a government department launched a successful and contemporary consumer product.

Big M accounted for sales of 19 million litres per year, and licence fees of $6 – 6.5 million pa prior to the trademarks being sold in 2000 for almost $62 million. Big M flavoured milk is available primarily in Melbourne, regional and rural areas of Victoria and the southern and western Riverina regions of New South Wales near the state border of Victoria. In recent years distribution of the Big M brand has expanded further north into the rest of New South Wales and into Queensland as well as its state of origin.

The brand gained initial popularity with its advertising association with surf and the beach culture. There were a number of subsequent ad campaigns in Victoria such as 'Think Big, but not too big'. It is sold in cartons, Tetra Briks and plastic bottles in both fresh and UHT varieties. Big M is also available in a low fat "light" chocolate variety (0.9% fat vs 3.3% for the normal product).

== Flavours ==
The Big M line-up has evolved over the years, now consisting of the following five flavours as part of their current permanent range:

- Strawberry
- Chocolate
- Banana
- Iced Coffee
- Double Choc

Flavours previously part of the range or available for a limited time include:

- Banana Split
- Blueberry
- **Blue Heaven**
- Caramel
- **Choc Berry**
- Chocanana
- Choc Pine
- Choc Lamington
- Choc Mint
- **Choc-Orange Jaffa**
- **Egg Flip**
- Fruity Mix
- Hokey Pokey
- **Honeycomb**
- Lime
- Mocha
- **Pine Lime**
- Toffee Whip
- Vanilla
- Vanilla Malt

The flavours in bold were advertised as part of a Big M 'Flavour Flashback' promotion in 2010, with one to be voted back into regular sale. The winner was announced on 5 July 2010 as Big Egg Flip. It was retired in early 2011 and replaced with Honeycomb as another limited edition. Honeycomb was subsequently replaced by a limited edition Choc Berry in mid-2011. Egg Flip subsequently returned in late 2012, and has since made several re-appearances as a limited edition flavour. Blue Heaven has also been re-introduced as a limited time flavour several times, with its appearance in 2021 overtaking sales of the brand's most popular Strawberry flavour.

== See also ==
- Flavored milk
- Chocolate milk
- Coffee milk
- Milk
