= Oak (flavoured milk) =

Australian brand of flavoured milk

Oak Milk

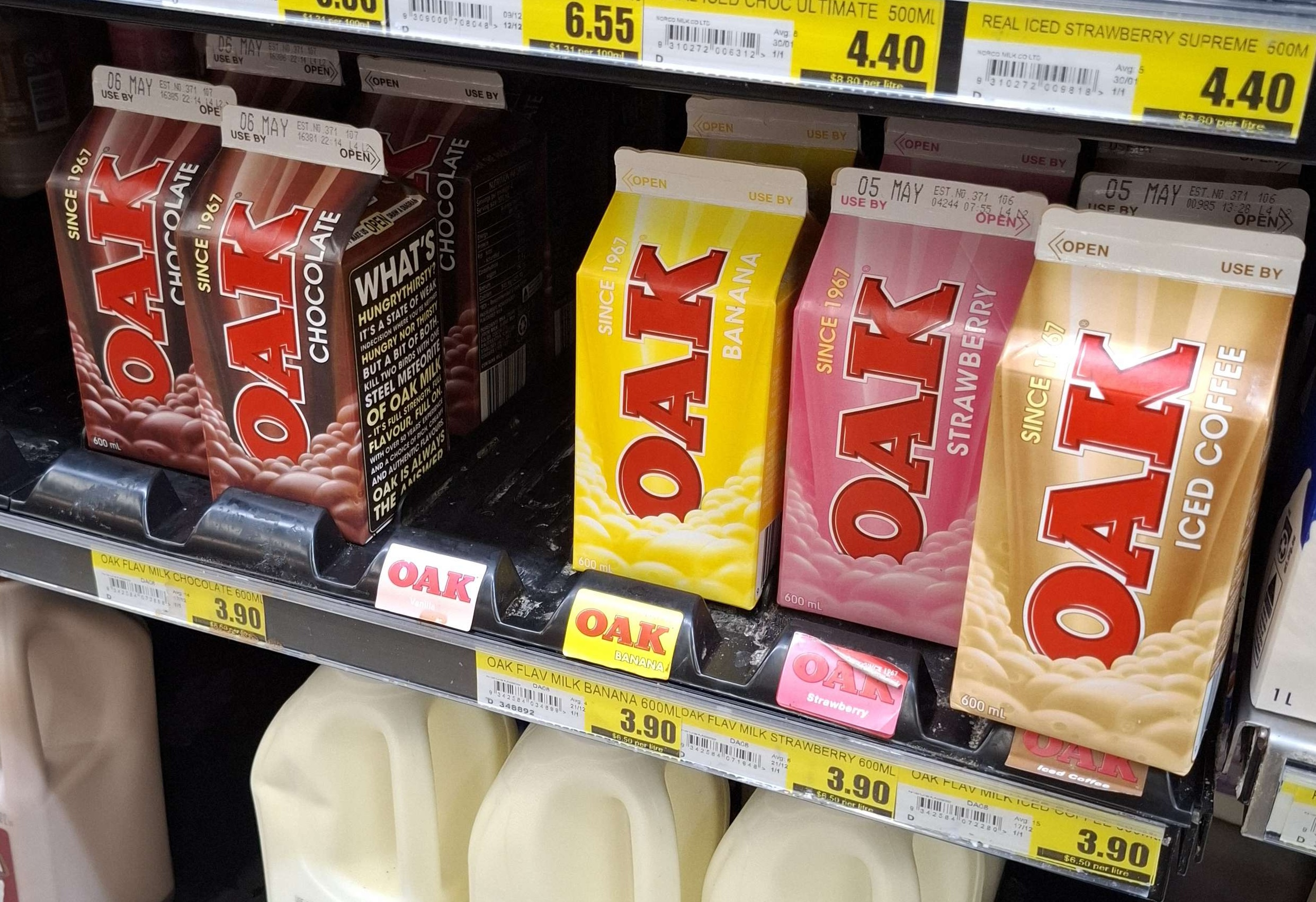
- Oak flavored milks in an IGA Supermarkets, after the discontinuation of Oak Classic Vanilla
- Type: Flavoured milk
- Manufacturer: Lactalis
- Origin: Australia, New South Wales
- Introduced: 1967
- Related products: Farmer's Union Iced Coffee, Dare (flavoured milk), Boss Coffee

Oak (stylised OAK) is an Australian pasteurised flavoured milk and coffee milk brand owned by a French multinational corporation, Lactalis. It was first established in 1967 in New South Wales, as the general dairy brand of the Raymond Terrace Co-operative and its successor the Hunter Valley Co-operative Dairy Company. The origin of the Oak brand goes back to 1903. Oak flavoured milk was launched in Queensland, South Australia, and Victoria in 1998. It was discontinued in Victoria in 2006 but relaunched in 2010. Oak launched in Western Australia in October 2013. Oak was the naming rights sponsor of the National Rugby League team, the Penrith Panthers from 2012 until 2024.

== History ==
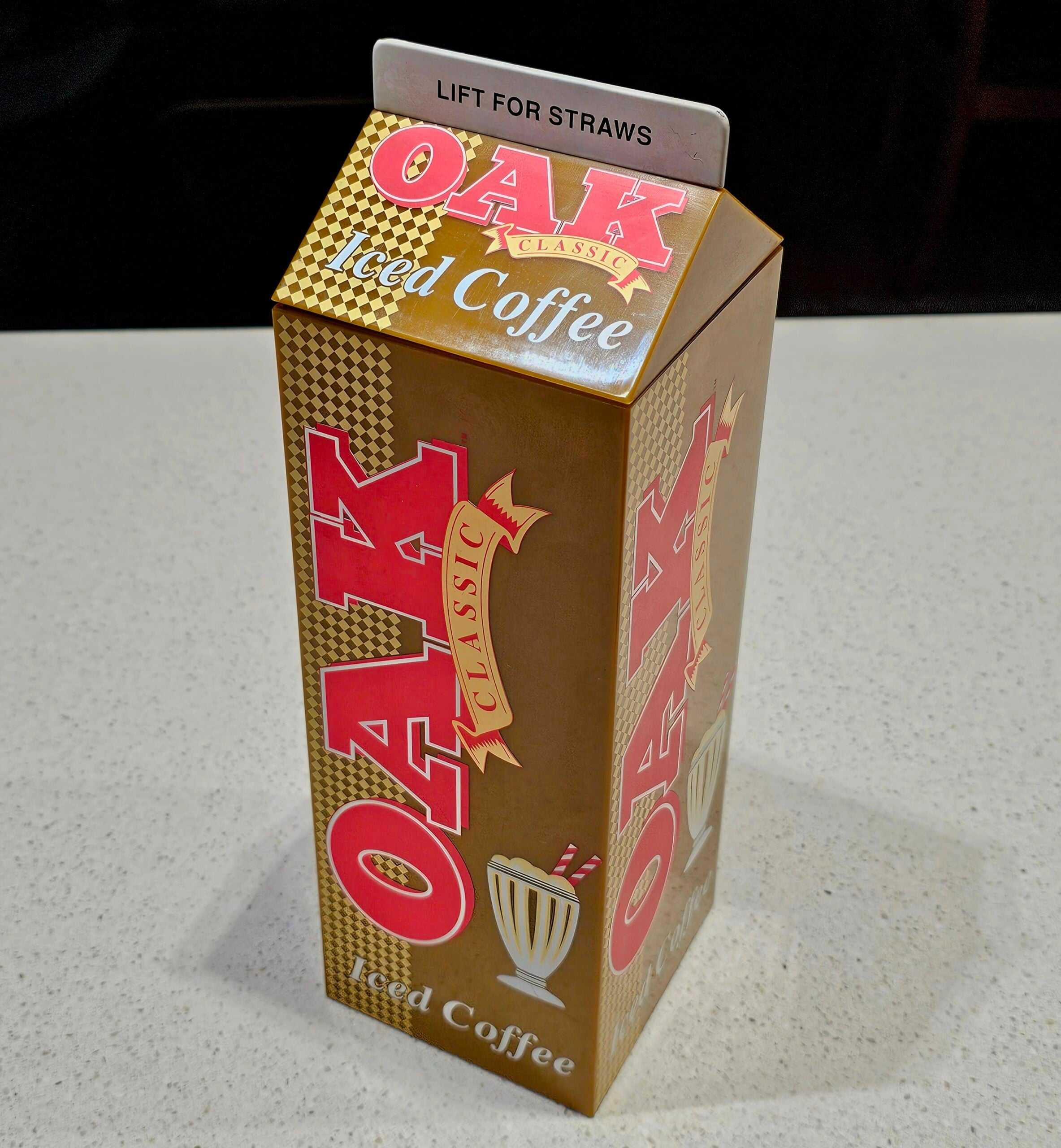
1987 Oak Classic Iced Coffee Promotional Dispenser

Before 1967 and into the 1980s, Oak was used by the Hunter Valley Co-operative Dairy Company as a general-purpose brand applied to its standard dairy output, including fresh milk and dried milk products such as milk powder produced for storage and surplus management. It functioned primarily as an umbrella label for co-operative dairy processing rather than a dedicated flavoured milk range.

This changed in 1967 with the introduction of Oak Iced Coffee, which marked the brand’s shift into the flavoured milk market and positioned it as a competitor in Australia’s growing ready-to-drink dairy sector, including products such as Farmers Union Iced Coffee.

== Muswellbrook Oak Factory ==
The Muswellbrook Oak Factory, located in the suburb of Muswellbrook in the Upper Hunter region of New South Wales, was constructed between 1945 and 1953 by the Hunter Valley Co-operative Dairy Company to process increasing volumes of milk from local dairy farms. Originally designed with facilities for milk treatment, drying, butter production and refrigeration, the plant became a key industrial site in the region and played an important role in managing seasonal milk surpluses, including the production of milk powder.

From the 1950s, and particularly after the launch of Oak flavored milk in 1967, the factory became closely associated with Oak products distributed across New South Wales and later nationally. The facility ceased dairy production in June 1994 following the restructuring of the co-operative sector, after which it was repurposed for wine and spirits production before falling into disuse in 2019.

In 2025, redevelopment commenced to convert the former factory into a rum distillery, marking a new phase in the adaptive reuse of the heritage industrial site.
