= Bega Group =

Australian food and beverage manufacturer

- Type: Public company
- Traded as: ASX: BGA; S&P/ASX 200 component
- Industry: Dairy, Food processing
- Founded: July 1899; 127 years ago
- Headquarters: Bega, New South Wales, Australia
- Key people: Peter Findlay (CEO)
- Products: Cheese, milk, dairy products, peanut butter, spreads, packaged foods
- Production output: ▼297,668 tonnes (2020); 303,252 tonnes (2019)
- Revenue: ▲A$3,774.6M (2026)
- Operating income: ▲A$106.9M (2026)
- Net income: ▲A$54.8M (2026)
- Subsidiaries: Bega Dairy & Drinks; Vegemite
- Website: Official website

The Bega Group is an Australian diversified food and drinks company with manufacturing sites in New South Wales, Queensland, Western Australia and Victoria. Founded as an agricultural cooperative in the town of Bega, New South Wales, by their dairy suppliers, it became a public company in 2011 when it listed on the Australian Securities Exchange. Close to half of shares publicly traded are still held by Bega's farmer-suppliers. It is currently one of the largest companies in the dairy sector in Australia, with a base milk supply in 2018 of approximately 750 million litres per annum.

Over half of the Bega Group's revenue (as of 2019) comes from their spreads, dairy consumer packaged goods and other grocery products, with their flagship Bega brand holding 15.7% of the Australian retail cheese market. The Bega Group's other major consumer and foodservice packaged goods brands are Vegemite, Farmers Table, Zoosh, Picky Picky, Tatura and Dairymont. The Bega branded Australia retail and foodservice cheese products are distributed by Fonterra under a long-term agreement. Just under a third of the Bega Group's revenue (as of 2019) was from exports. The cheese products are exported to 40 countries and distributed across Australia where they are available in most supermarkets and general stores.

Their other major business segments include bulk core dairy ingredients such as cheese, cream cheese and powdered milk (making up approximately 35% of revenue) and nutritional products produced under the Bega Bionutrients brand (such as lactoferrin and milk protein concentrate), which make up around 9% of revenue.

== History ==
=== Founding and early growth (1850s–1996) ===
The origins of Bega Cheese go back to the 1850s when dairying began in the Bega Valley. In 1899 local farmers established the Bega Co-operative Creamery Company. The following year the original Bega Cheese factory was opened. The business remained regional for much of the 20th century, but by 1960 Bega had begun to expand operations, commissioning a milk processing and packaging facility in Fyshwick, ACT to serve broader markets.

=== Expansion, diversification and public listing (1997–2016) ===
The late 1990s marked a turning point for Bega Cheese. In 1997, the company constructed a modern cheese processing and packaging facility on Ridge Street in Bega and entered into a joint venture with Dairy Farmers (then known as Australian Co-operative Foods). This venture, (now known as Capitol Chilled Foods), focused on processing and distributing chilled products in the ACT and Southern NSW.

Bega's expansion accelerated in the 2000s. In 2007, it acquired a 70% stake in Tatura Milk Industries, completing full ownership by 2011. Along the way, the company acquired several key assets: De Cicco Industries in the Melbourne suburb of Coburg (2008), Kraft Foods' cheese manufacturing facility in Strathmerton, Victoria (2009), and a new nutritional canning and blending plant in Derrimut, Victoria (2014).

The company was publicly listed on the Australian Securities Exchange (ASX) in August 2011.

=== Transformation through key acquisitions (2017–2021) ===
From 2017 onwards, Bega changed into a diversified food group. In January 2017 it acquired Mondelez International’s Australian meals business, securing household names like Vegemite, Zoosh, and Bonox, as well as licences for Dairylea and Snackabouts. The deal also included the Port Melbourne manufacturing site and a licence for Kraft-branded cheese and peanut butter. The same year Bega sold its Derrimut infant formula plant and a spray dryer in Tatura to U.S.-based Mead Johnson and acquired the Peanut Company of Australia in Kingaroy, Queensland.

In 2018 Bega acquired the Koroit milk drying and butter processing facility in Victoria from Saputo and closed its Coburg facility in 2019. That year the company launched the Purple Hive Project under its B Honey brand, focusing on honeybee biosecurity.

In 2019 the company won a legal dispute with Kraft Heinz over the packaging of its peanut butter. In 2020, Kraft Heinz appealed the case to the Full Court of the Federal Court of Australia, but was dismissed. In 2021, the two companies had reached a confidential settlement.

In November 2020 Bega purchased Lion Dairy & Drinks from the Kirin Company for $534 million. The acquisition included major dairy brands such as Dairy Farmers and Pura Milk.

=== Bega Group (2022-present) ===
In 2022, Bega consolidated its expanding portfolio under the Bega Group, bringing together brands including Bega Cheese, Vegemite, Pura, Dare Iced Coffee, Dairy Farmers, Farmers Union, and Zooper Dooper.

In August 2023, Bega entered into an agreement to acquire Betta Milk and Meander Valley Dairy from TasFoods Limited for $11 million. The deal also included rights to the Pyengana Dairy brand, further strengthening Bega's presence in Tasmania and the national dairy sector.

== Brands ==
- Bega Cheese
- Vegemite
- Dairy Farmers
- Pura
- Farmers Union
- Yoplait (Australia only)
- Daily Juice
- Zooper Dooper
- Dare Iced Coffee
- Masters
- Big M
- Mildura Juice
- Zoosh

=== Bega Dairy & Drinks ===
BDD Pty Ltd
- Type: Subsidiary
- Industry: Food & beverage
- Founded: 1991
- Headquarters: Docklands, Melbourne, Victoria, Australia
- Area served: Australia; New Zealand; Asia
- Products: Dairy & juice
- Revenue: ▼A$2.00 billion (2015)
- Parent: Bega Group
- Subsidiaries: Dairy Farmers & others

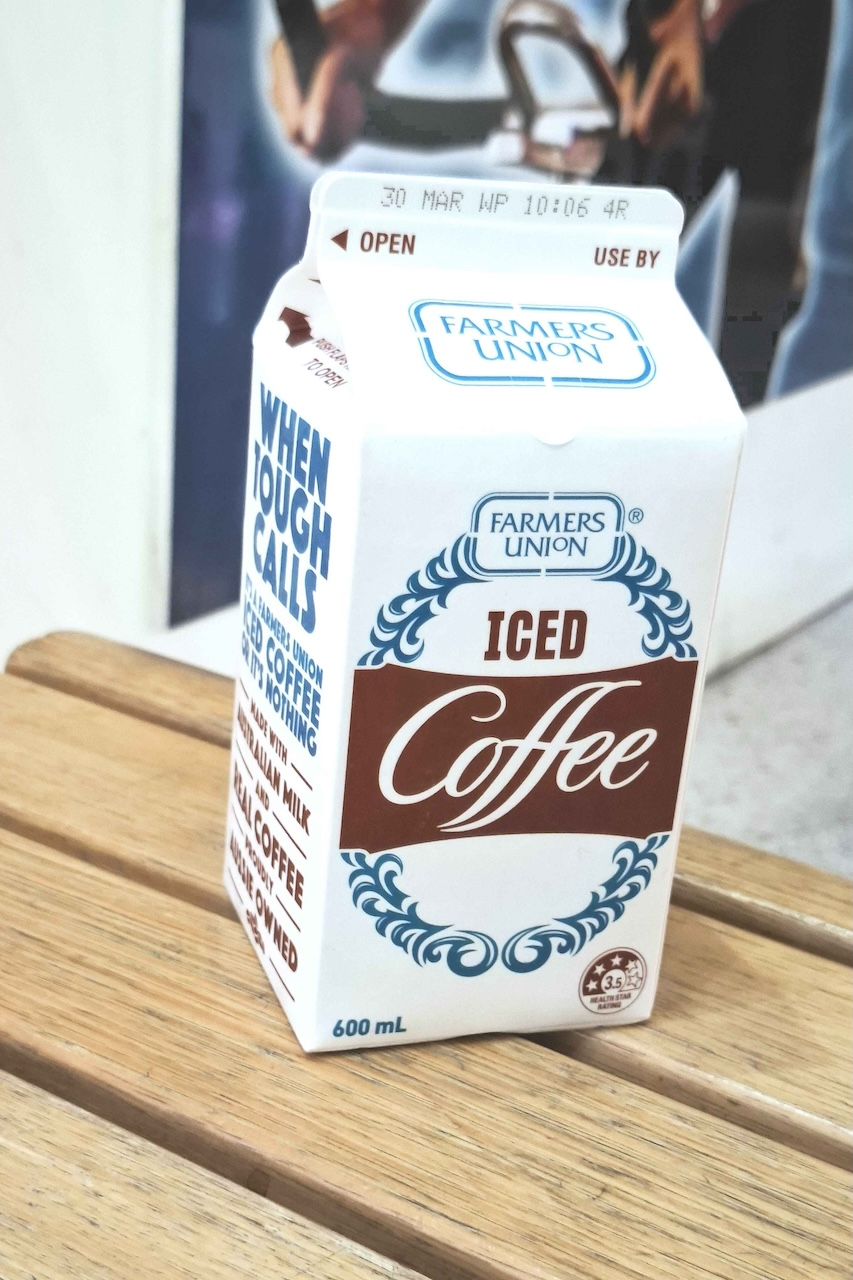
Farmers Union Iced Coffee, a coffee milk-style beverage originating in South Australia that is made by Bega Dairy & Drinks

BDD Pty Ltd, trading as Bega Dairy & Drinks, is a subsidiary of Bega Group, having been purchased from the Japanese company Kirin (who owns Lion in Australia) in November 2020. It was previously a company known as National Foods prior to 2009. While owned by Kirin, it was known as Lion Dairy & Drinks. It specialises in dairy food and juice, with core activities in milk, yoghurt, cream, dairy desserts, juice and speciality cheese.

National Foods was created by the Adelaide Steamship Company in 1991 by amalgamating several dairy and food related businesses. On 25 November 2019, it was announced that China's Mengniu Dairy had purchased Lion Dairy from Kirin, for approximately A$600 million (US$407 million). The deal was not opposed by the Australian Competition & Consumer Commission, but was rejected by Treasurer Josh Frydenberg. On 25 August 2020, Kirin, the parent company of Lion, announced the sales has collapsed. In November 2020, the business was sold to Bega Cheese for A$534 million.

In early October 2009, National Foods gave evidence at an Australian Senate inquiry into milk prices; the Tasmanian Farmers and Graziers Association (TFGA) was concerned because National Foods was paying Tasmanian farmers only 29 cents a litre for milk, about 10c/L below the amount it costs to produce the milk.

== See also ==
- Dairy farming in Australia
- List of cheesemakers
- List of oldest companies in Australia
