= List of restaurants in Taiwan =

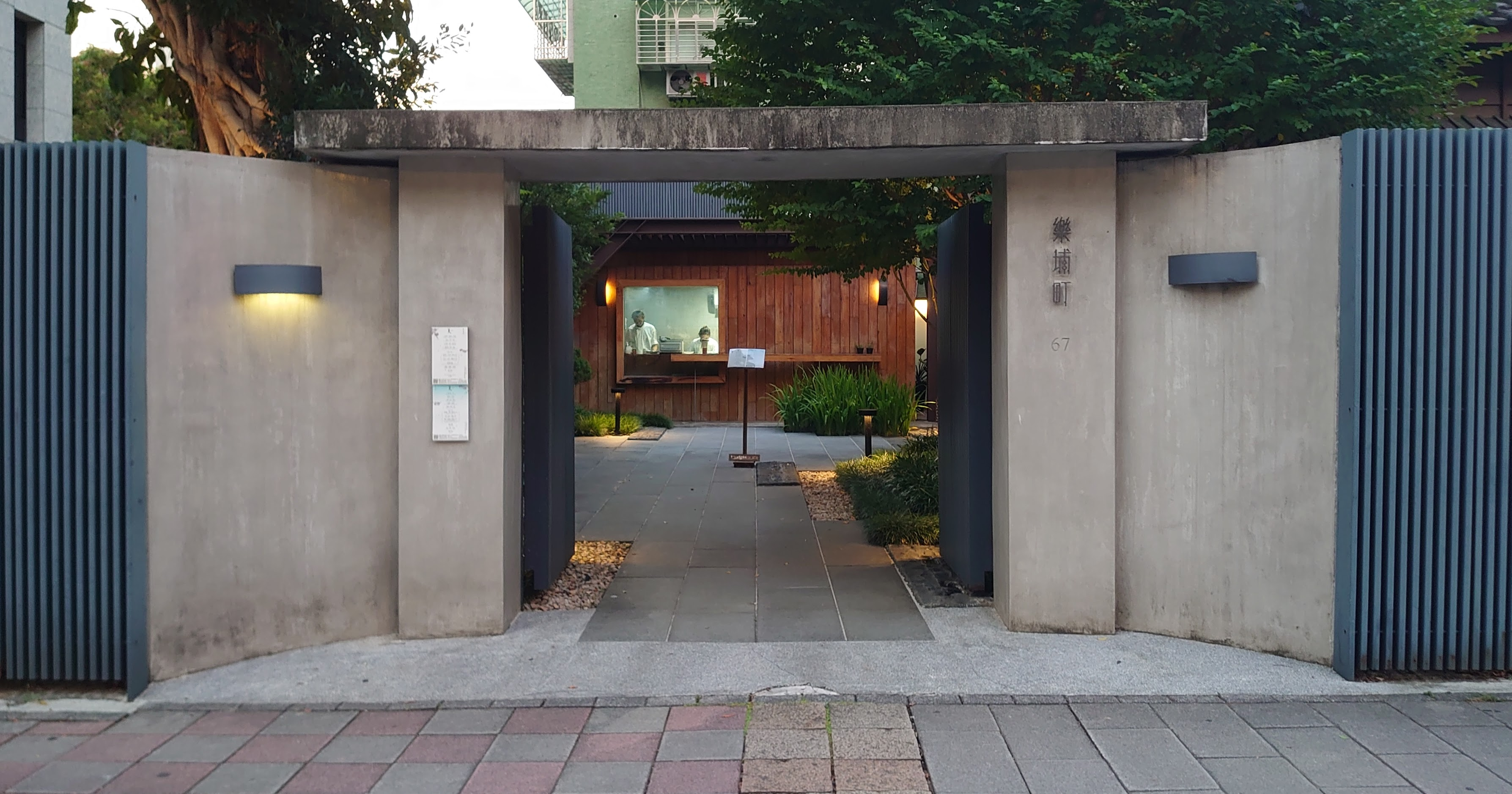
Leputing in Taipei, opened in the 1920s during the Japanese colonial era

This is a list of notable restaurants in Taiwan. In 2018 there were 116,311 restaurants in Taiwan.

== Restaurants ==
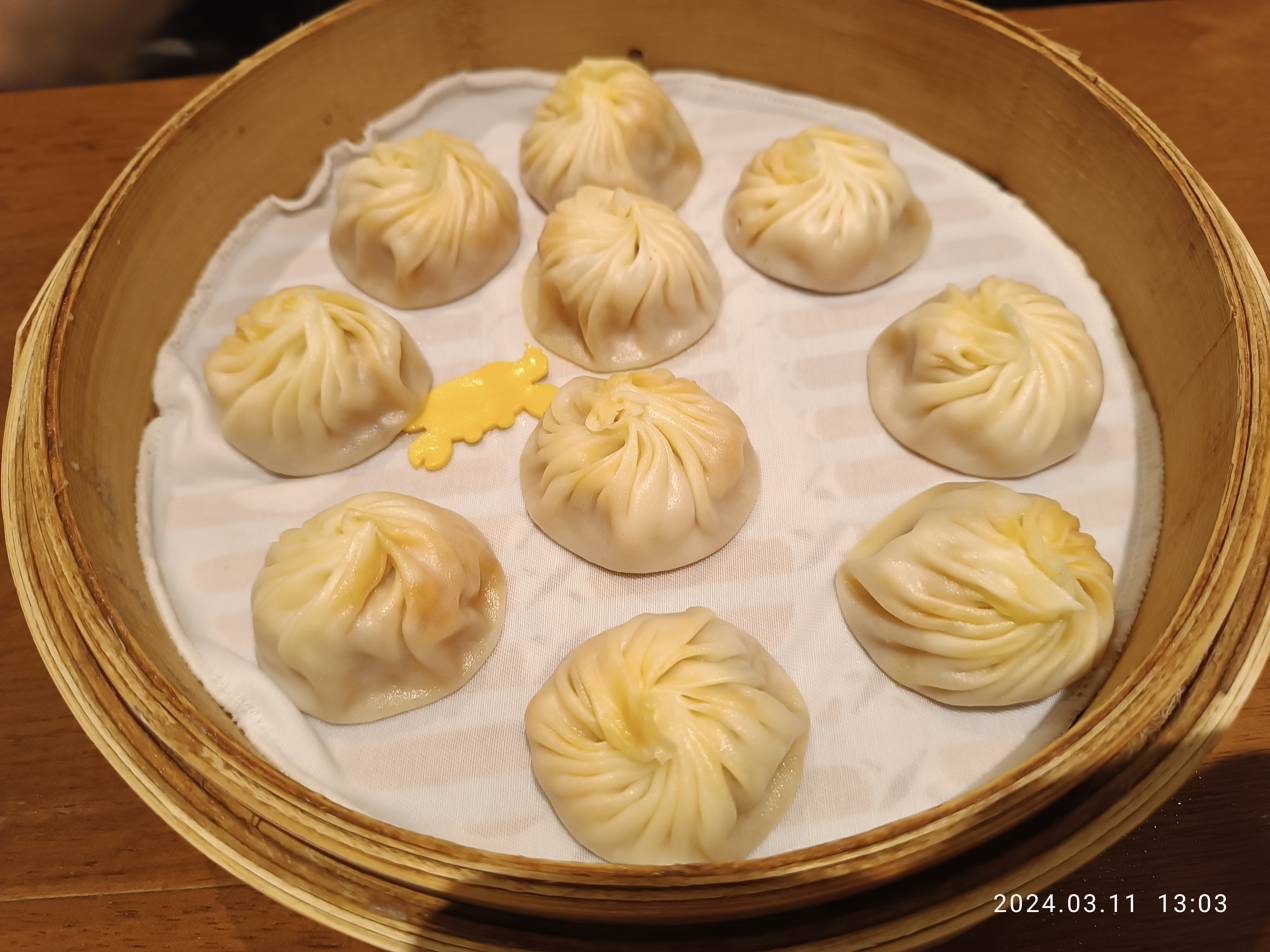
Xiaolongbao at Din Tai Fung

- Dayne's Texas Barbecue
- Din Tai Fung – Taiwanese restaurant chain
- Good Friend Cold Noodles
- Leputing – Restaurant in Da'an, Taipei, Taiwan
- Modern Toilet Restaurant – Toilet-themed restaurant chain in Taiwan
- MINIMAL (restaurant) – Ice cream parlor in Taichung, Taiwan
- Le Palais (restaurant) – Cantonese restaurant in Taiwan
- RAW (restaurant) – Restaurant in Taipei, Taiwan
- Rong Rong Yuan
- Taïrroir – Taiwanese Michelin starred restaurant

=== Vegetarian/Vegan ===
- Fruitful Food – Taiwanese chain of vegetarian restaurants
- Little Tree Food – Chain of vegetarian restaurants
- Loving Hut – Chain of vegan restaurants
- Miacucina – Taiwanese chain of vegetarian restaurants
- Vege Creek – Chain of vegetarian restaurants

== Coffee houses, tea houses, and bakeries ==
- 85C Bakery Cafe – International Taiwanese chain selling hot beverages and bakery products
- Barista Coffee (Taiwan) – Taiwanese coffeehouse chain
- Cafe!n – Taiwanese coffeehouse chain
- Cama Café – Taiwanese coffeehouse chain
- Chatime – Taiwan-based franchise teahouse chain
- Chia Te Bakery – Taiwanese bakery chain
- Chun Shui Tang – Inventor of bubble tea
- CoCo Fresh Tea & Juice – Taiwanese bubble tea drink franchise
- Dante Coffee – Taiwanese coffeehouse chain
- EasyWay – Taiwanese former tea outlet (established 1992)
- Ecoffee – Taiwanese coffeehouse chain
- Gong Cha – Taiwan bubble tea chain
- Kuo Yuan Ye – Taiwanese pastry store chain
- Lee Hu Cake Shop – Taiwanese bakery specialising in Taiwanese pastries
- Louisa Coffee – Taiwanese coffeehouse chain
- Lollicup Coffee & Tea – Food retailer and manufacturer
- Meet Fresh – Taiwanese dessert restaurant chain
- Milksha – Taiwanese bubble tea shop chain
- Miyahara Ice Cream – Confectionery in Central, Taichung, Taiwan
- Quickly – Bubble tea chain
- SPR Coffee
- Sunmerry Bakery – International Taiwanese chain selling beverages and bakery products
- Ten Ren Tea – Taiwan-based tea company
- Wu Pao Chun Bakery – Taiwanese bakery chain

== Fast food chains ==
- Alleycat's Pizza – Taiwanese pizza chain
- Bafang Dumpling – Taiwanese restaurant chain
- J&G Fried Chicken – Fried chicken chain based in Taichung, Taiwan
- KLG – Taiwanese fast food chain
- Laya Burger – Taiwanese breakfast chain
- Napoli Pizza and Fried Chicken – Taiwanese pizza and fried chicken restaurant chain
- Q Burger – Taiwanese breakfast and brunch chain restaurant
- TKK Fried Chicken – Taiwanese fried chicken chain

== See also ==
- List of Michelin-starred restaurants in Taiwan
- Taiwanese cuisine
- Night markets in Taiwan
- List of night markets in Taiwan
