= Laya Burger =

Taiwanese breakfast chain

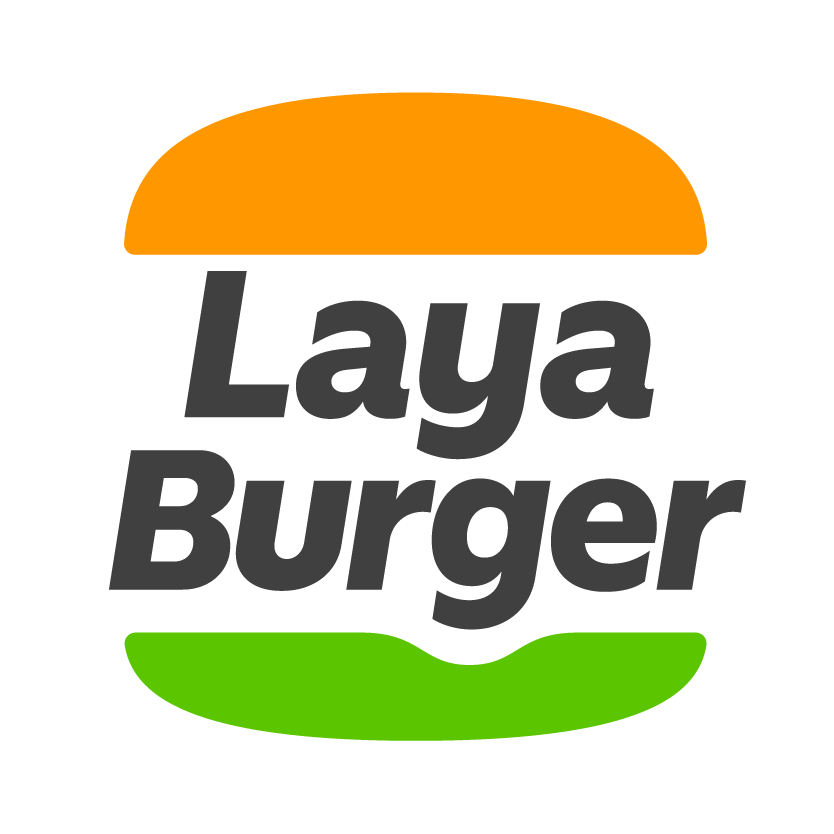
- Industry: Food, Breakfast
- Founded: 2002; 24 years ago
- Headquarters: Taoyuan City, Taiwan
- Area served: Taiwan
- Key people: 徐和森 Xu He-sen, founder
- Products: Burgers, brioches, sandwiches, pasta, soft drinks, coffee
- Website: www.laya.com.tw

Laya Burger (Chinese: 拉亞漢堡; pinyin: Lāyà Hànbǎo) is a Taiwanese chain of brunch restaurants. Laya Burger opened its first restaurant in July 2002, in Yangmei District located in Taoyuan, Taiwan. Popular for its whole wheat egg rolls with pork floss and mashed taro, Laya Burger is amongst the top three most popular breakfast chains in Taiwan along with Mei & Mei (美而美) and My Warm Day (MWD). As of 2018, there are approximately 500 franchise stores in Taiwan.

== See also ==
- Q Burger
- J&G Fried Chicken
- TKK Fried Chicken
