= Sunmerry Bakery =

International Taiwanese retail chain

- Industry: Food and beverage
- Founded: 1986; 40 years ago
- Headquarters: Taipei, Taiwan
- Number of locations: Taiwan: 29 shops United States: 7 shops
- Area served: Worldwide
- Key people: Peter Kao
- Products: bread, cakes, coffee, pineapple cakes, bubble tea

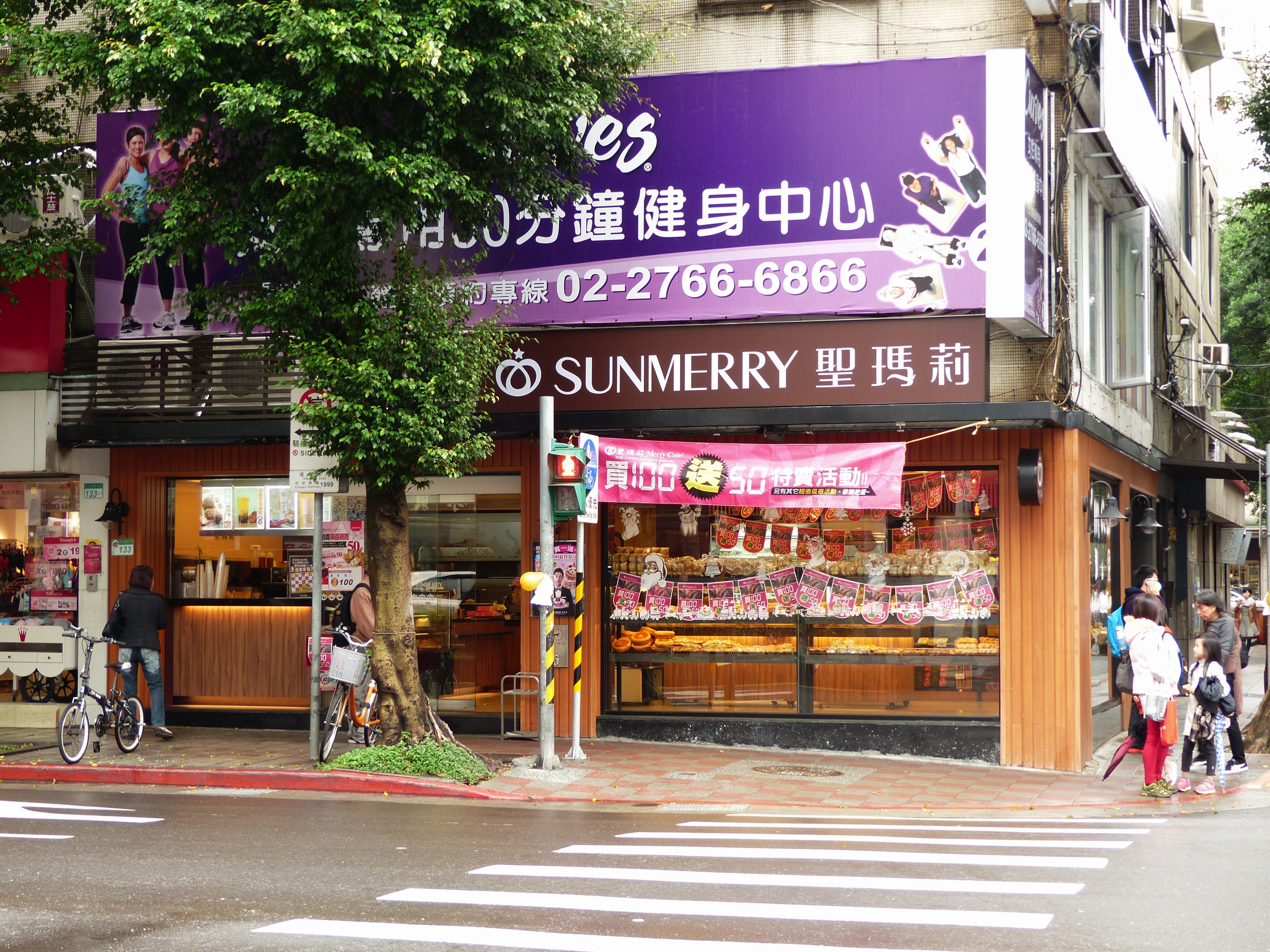
Sunmerry Bakery Taipei Minsheng Store.

Sunmerry Bakery (Chinese: 聖瑪莉; pinyin: Shèng Mǎlì) is a Taiwanese international chain of retailers founded in 1986 selling coffee, tea, and cakes, as well as desserts, bubble tea, and bakery products. It has 36 retail shops worldwide, 29 of which are located in Taiwan and 7 in the United States.

== History ==
- In 1986, Sunmerry Bakery was established: the first bakery was opened on Yongkang Street, Xinyi Road, Taipei.
- In 2015, Sunmerry's first overseas stores opened in New York City, USA was established.
- In 2018, the first sightseeing factory was established: the 6,600 m^{2} (71,000 sq ft) sightseeing factory combined with the central factory.

== Specialties ==
In 2020 during the COVID-19 pandemic, Sunmerry Bakery became famous for its 'Toilet Paper Cake', which is a four-chocolate chiffon sponge cake, layered with an Oreo-filling and covered with white chocolate.

== See also ==
- List of bakeries
- List of companies of Taiwan
- 85C Bakery Cafe
- Chia Te Bakery
