= Shilin Cixian Temple =

Historic structure in Taipei, Taiwan

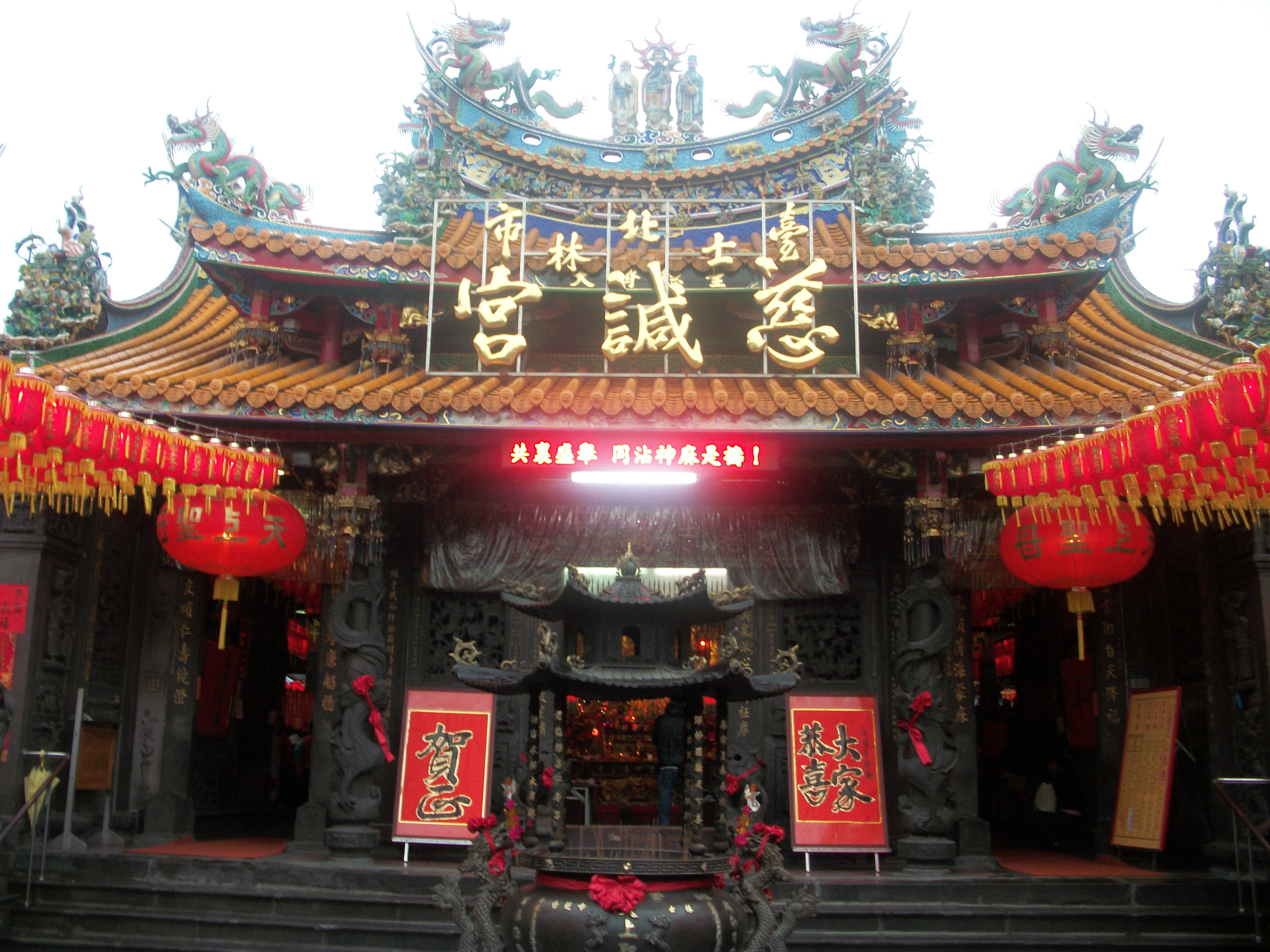
- The temple in 2010

Location
- Location: Taipei
- Country: Taiwan
- Interactive map of Shilin Cixian Temple

Shilin Cixian Temple is a temple in Taipei, Taiwan. It is located inside the Shilin Night Market. The temple, which is dedicated to the sea goddess Mazu, was established in 1796 and moved to its current location in 1864. Its doors feature artwork painted by the Tainan-born artist Chen Yu-feng in 1960.

== See also ==
- List of tourist attractions in Taipei
