= Q Burger =

Taiwanese breakfast and brunch chain restaurant

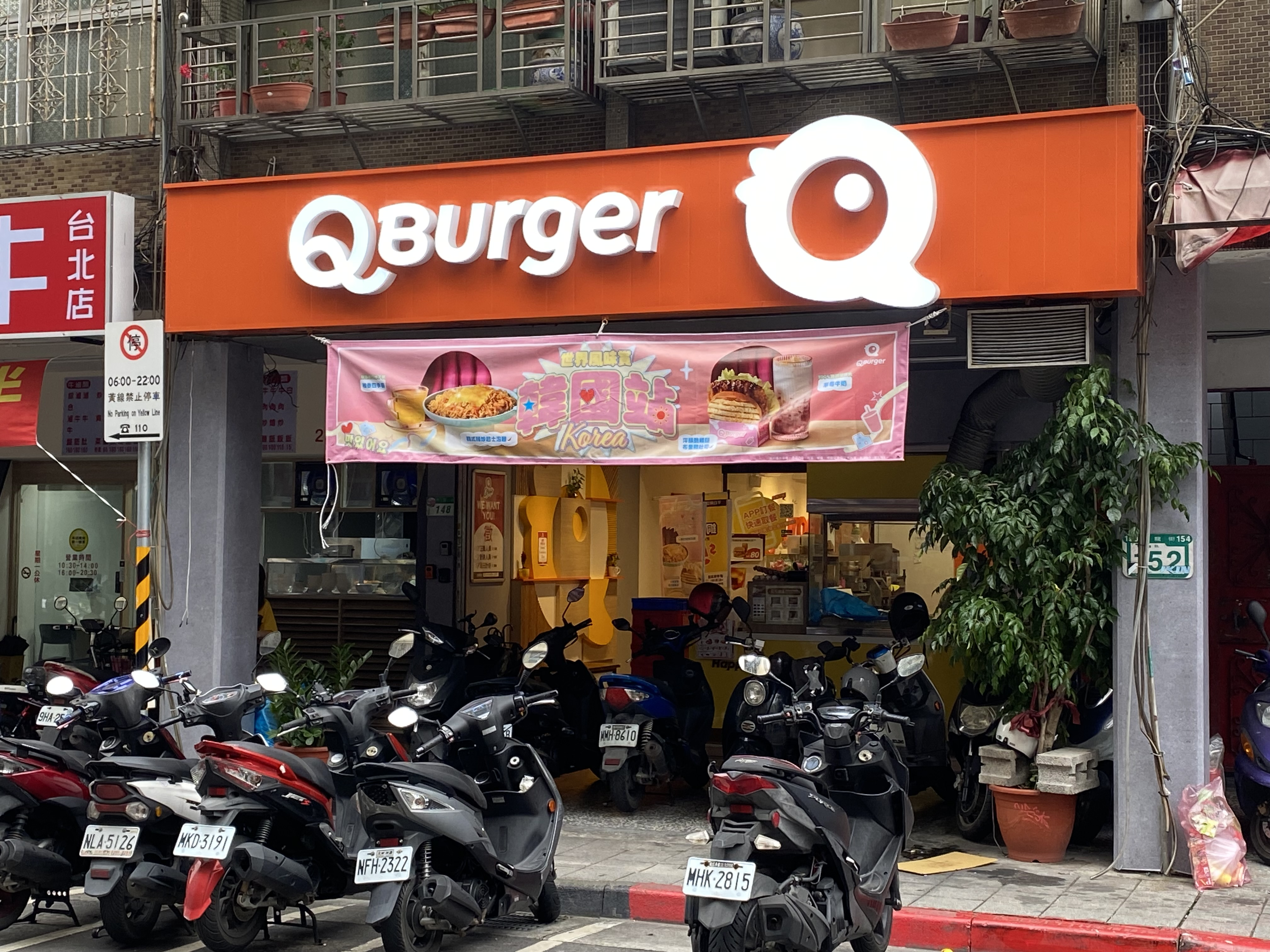
- Native name: 饗樂餐飲
- Company type: Public
- Traded as: TWSE: 7797
- Industry: Brunch restaurants
- Founded: 2013; 13 years ago
- Headquarters: New Taipei City, Taiwan
- Number of locations: 373 stores (2025)
- Area served: Taiwan
- Key people: Zheng Ruibin (鄭瑞賓; chairman)
- Products: Burgers, sandwiches, pasta, soft drinks, coffee
- Website: www.qburger.com.tw

Q Burger (Chinese: 饗樂餐飲; pinyin: Xiǎnglè Cānyǐn) is a Taiwanese chain of brunch restaurants. The company opened its first restaurant in 2013 in Sanchong District, New Taipei City. It was listed on the Taiwan Stock Exchange's Emerging Stock Board in January 2025.

The chain operates more than 373 stores across Taiwan as of January 2025, with plans to open 500 by the end of 2025 and 1,000 by 2030. 185 of its stores are operated by Q Burger directly, with the rest being franchised locations. Q Burger plans to expand into international markets; it has successfully registered trademarks in Taiwan, Japan, South Korea, mainland China, Vietnam, Singapore, and Malaysia, with ongoing applications in the United States and Canada.

== Awards ==
Q Burger was awarded with a National Award for Outstanding SMEs by the Ministry of Economic Affairs of the Republic of China in 2021, the first restaurant brand to win the award in 30 years. It also won the Golden Boat Award for Innovative Services in 2022 for its approach to digitization in service and operations.

== See also ==
- Laya Burger
- TKK Fried Chicken
