= Shilin Night Market =

Night market in Taipei, Taiwan

Shilin Night Market 士林夜市
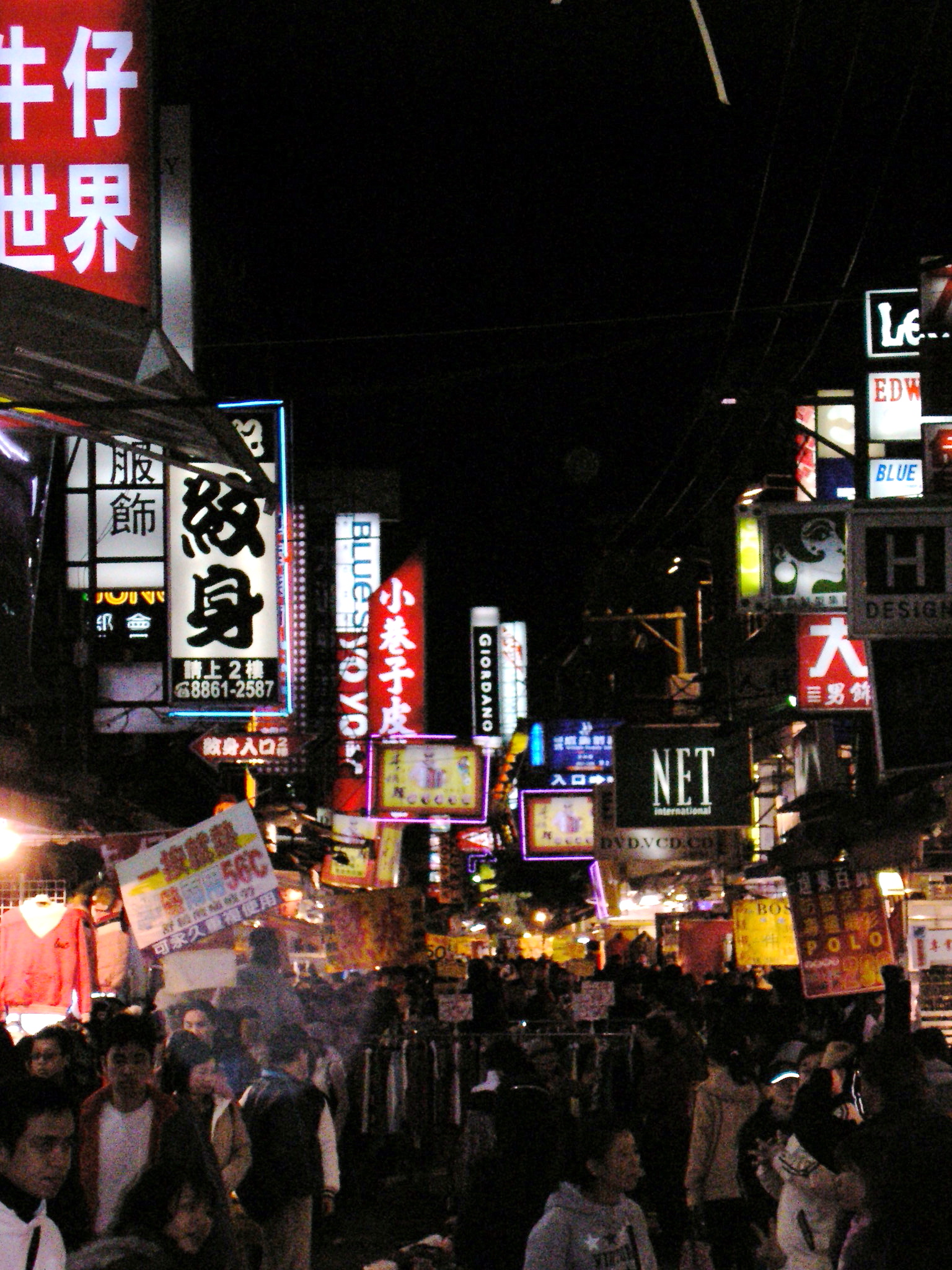
- Location: Shilin, Taipei, Taiwan; 25.0866°N 121.5254°E
- Opening date: 1913 (original location); 2011 (current location)
- Closing date: October 2002 (original location)
- Environment: Night market
- Number of tenants: 539 stalls
- Parking: 400 cars
- Interactive map of Shilin Night Market 士林夜市

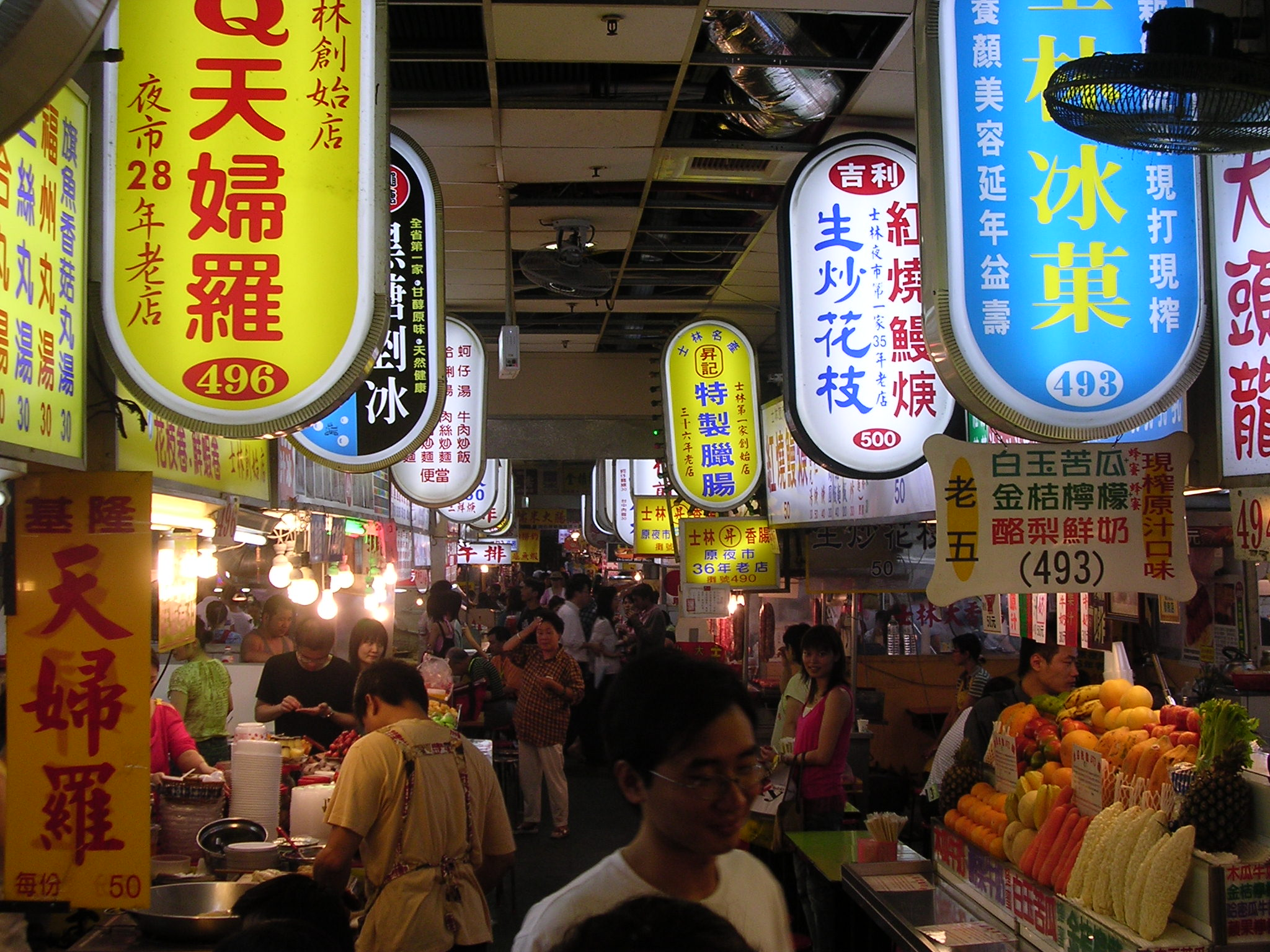
Interior of the Shilin Night Market food court

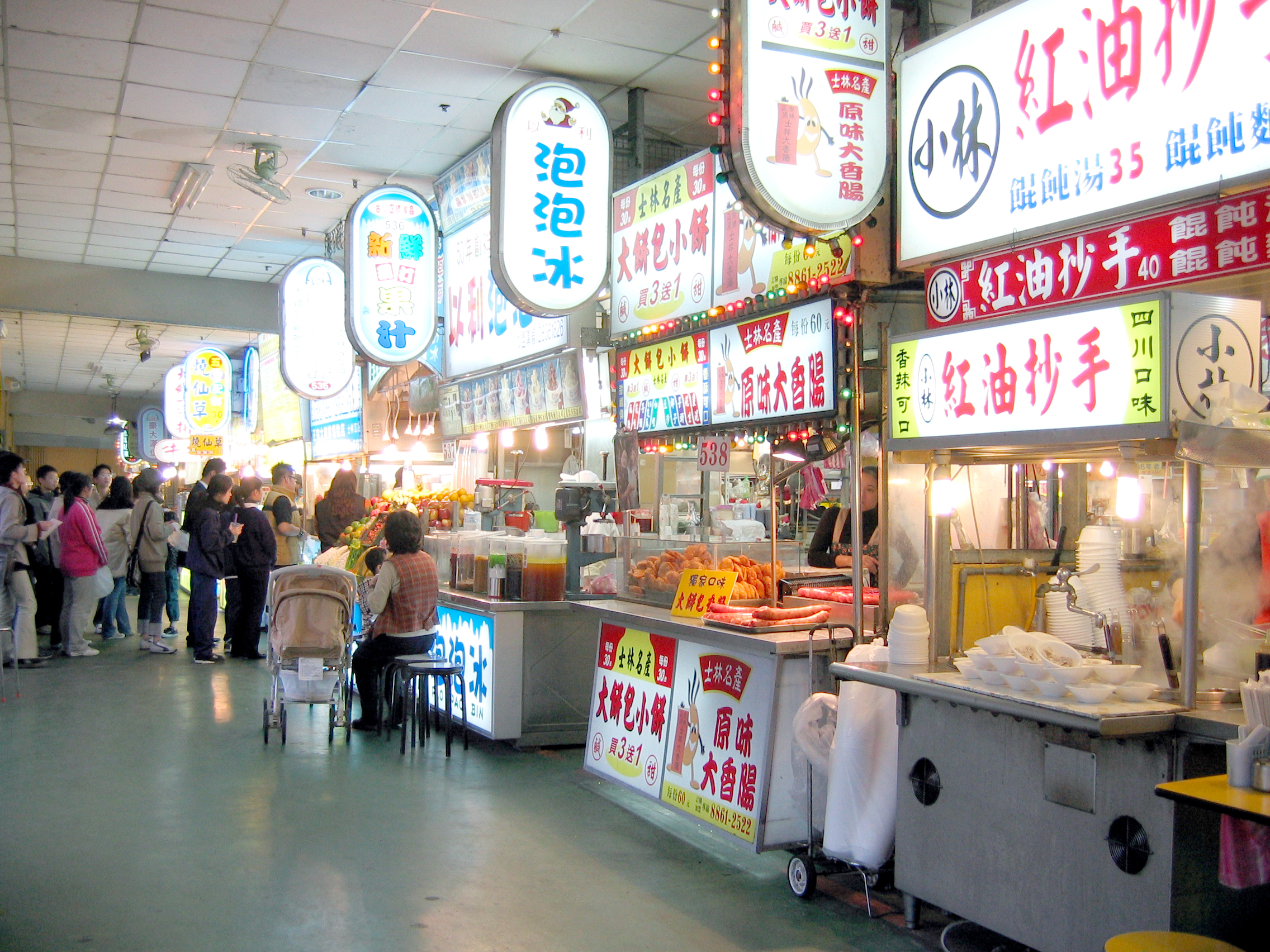
Inside the food court, many hawkers sell food from their stalls

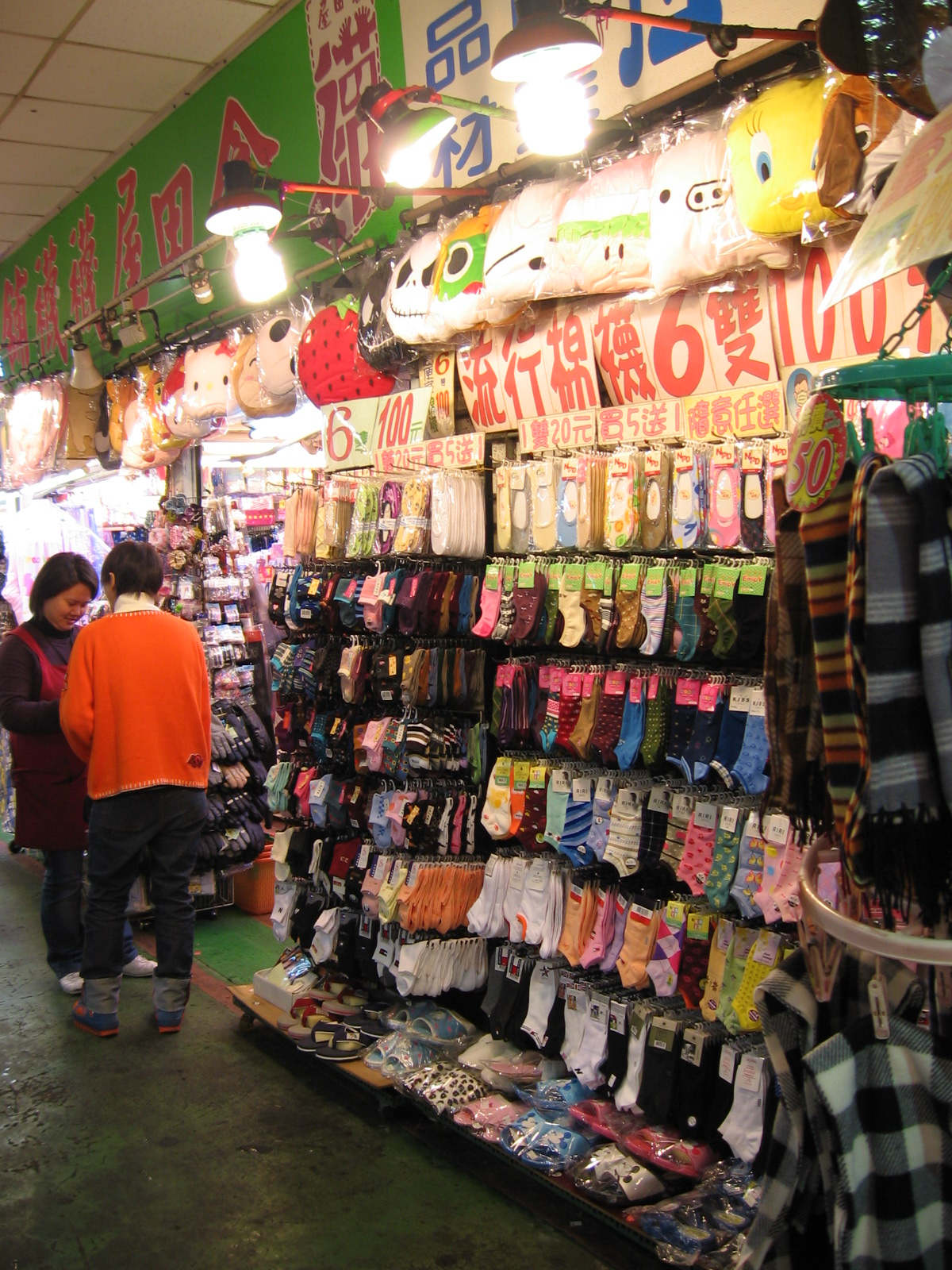
Besides food, many vendors sell clothes, jewelry, and other goods

Shilin Night Market (Chinese: 士林夜市; pinyin: Shìlín Yèshì) is a night market in Shilin District, Taipei, Taiwan, often considered to be the largest and most famous night market in Taiwan.

== Overview ==
The night market encompasses two distinct sections sharing a symbiotic relationship: a section formerly housed in the old Shilin Market building, containing mostly food vendors and small restaurants; and the surrounding businesses and shops selling other nonfood items. The food court holds 539 stalls, and the second floor serves as a parking lot for 400 cars.

In addition to the food court, side streets and alleys are lined with storefronts and roadside stands. Cinemas, video arcades, and karaoke bars are also prevalent in the area. Like most night markets in Taiwan, the local businesses and vendors begin opening around 16:00. As students begin returning home from school, crowds reach their peak between 20:00 and 23:00. Businesses continue operating well past midnight, closing around 01:00 or 02:00.

Tourist traffic has increased since the 1997 opening of two nearby stops on the Taipei Metro system. The night market is closest to Jiantan Station on Tamsui–Xinyi line (Tamsui/Red Line), and can be seen from the station platform.

== Historical development ==
The night market is located near the former location of a wharf on the Keelung River. Agricultural produce from farms in Shilin being shipped to other ports such as Banka and Dadaocheng would typically be sold in this area. The daytime Shilin Market was formally established in this area in 1909, and the market was inaugurated in 1913. With the influx of customers, many new businesses and food vendors began to establish themselves in the area and the Shilin Night Market was born. The most prominent landmark inside the night market is the centuries-old Matsu Temple, known as Shilin Cixian Temple, which was first established in 1796 and moved to its current location in 1864.

Shilin Night Market is the largest and most widely recognized night market in Taiwan, known primarily for its food vendors and nightlife attraction for both residents and tourists.

Due to safety, sanitation and fire hazard concerns, the old Shilin Market structure was demolished in October 2002 by the Taipei City Government; the food vendors formerly based within the old structure were relocated to a newer temporary structure a few hundred meters away, next to the Jiantan Station of the Taipei metro. Plans for the renovated site began in 1999. Work commenced in 2006 after the relocation of the vendors to the temporary site. The renovated site re-opened in 2011.

== Transportation ==
Shilin Night Market is accessible via the Tamsui–Xinyi line (Taipei Metro) at Jiantan Station. A number of bus routes also serve the area with stops at Jiantan Station, nearby Ming Chuan University, and Xiao Bei (Hsiao Pei) Street.

== Famous foods ==
- Bubble tea (珍珠奶茶)
- Chicken katsu (炸雞排)
- Cold noodles (涼麵), Good Friend Cold Noodles
- Fried buns (生煎包)
- Grilled king oyster mushrooms (燒烤杏鮑菇)
- Lemon aiyu jelly (檸檬愛玉)
- Oyster omelet (蚵仔煎)
- Oyster vermicelli (蚵仔麵線)
- Papaya milk (木瓜牛奶)
- Peanut candy (花生糖)
- Peanut butter and jelly sandwich (花生果醬三明治)
- Small Sausage in Large Sausage (大腸包小腸)
- Stinky tofu (臭豆腐)
- Taiwanese tempura (天婦羅)

== See also ==
- Night markets in Taiwan
- List of night markets in Taiwan
- List of restaurant districts and streets
