= Dante Coffee =

Taiwanese coffeehouse chain

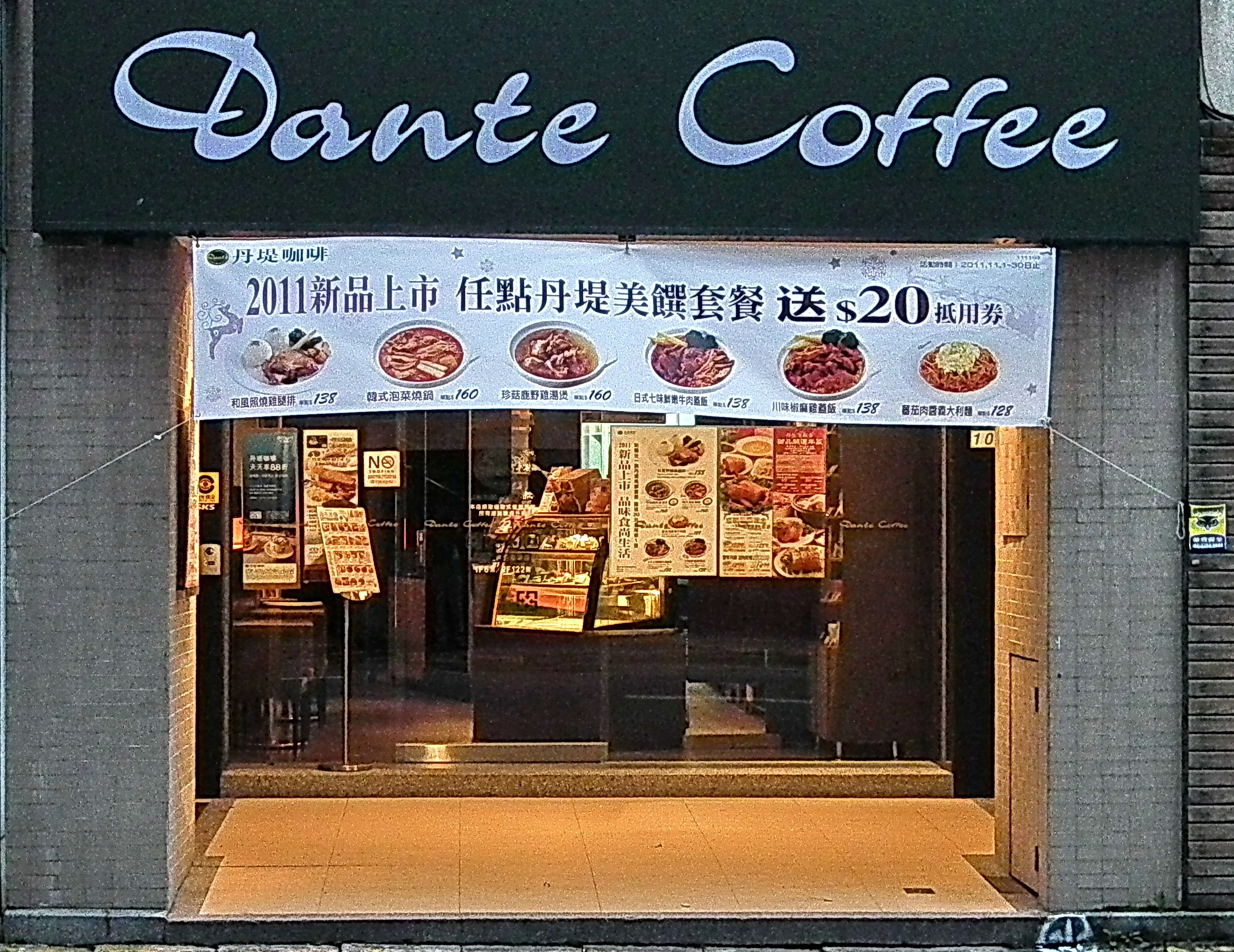
- Dante Coffee Baoqing Store
- Native name: 丹堤咖啡
- Type: Joint-stock company
- Industry: Coffee shop
- Founded: November 1993
- Founders: Shuyi Fang
- Headquarters: Taipei, Taiwan
- Number of locations: 18 (2024)
- Area served: Taiwan
- Products: Coffee beverages
- Website: www.dante.com.tw

Dante Coffee (Chinese: 丹堤咖啡) is a Taiwanese coffeehouse chain. The company began as a small coffee shop in Taipei in November 1993. Their first overseas location was opened in Jakarta, Indonesia in May 2006. On October 9, 2020, the dumpling chain Bafang Dumpling bought a 69 percent interest in the coffee chain.

== Name ==
The origin of the name Dante comes from the Italian poet Dante Alighieri who wrote the book Divine Comedy.

== See also ==
- List of coffeehouse chains
- List of companies of Taiwan
