= Rong Rong Yuan =

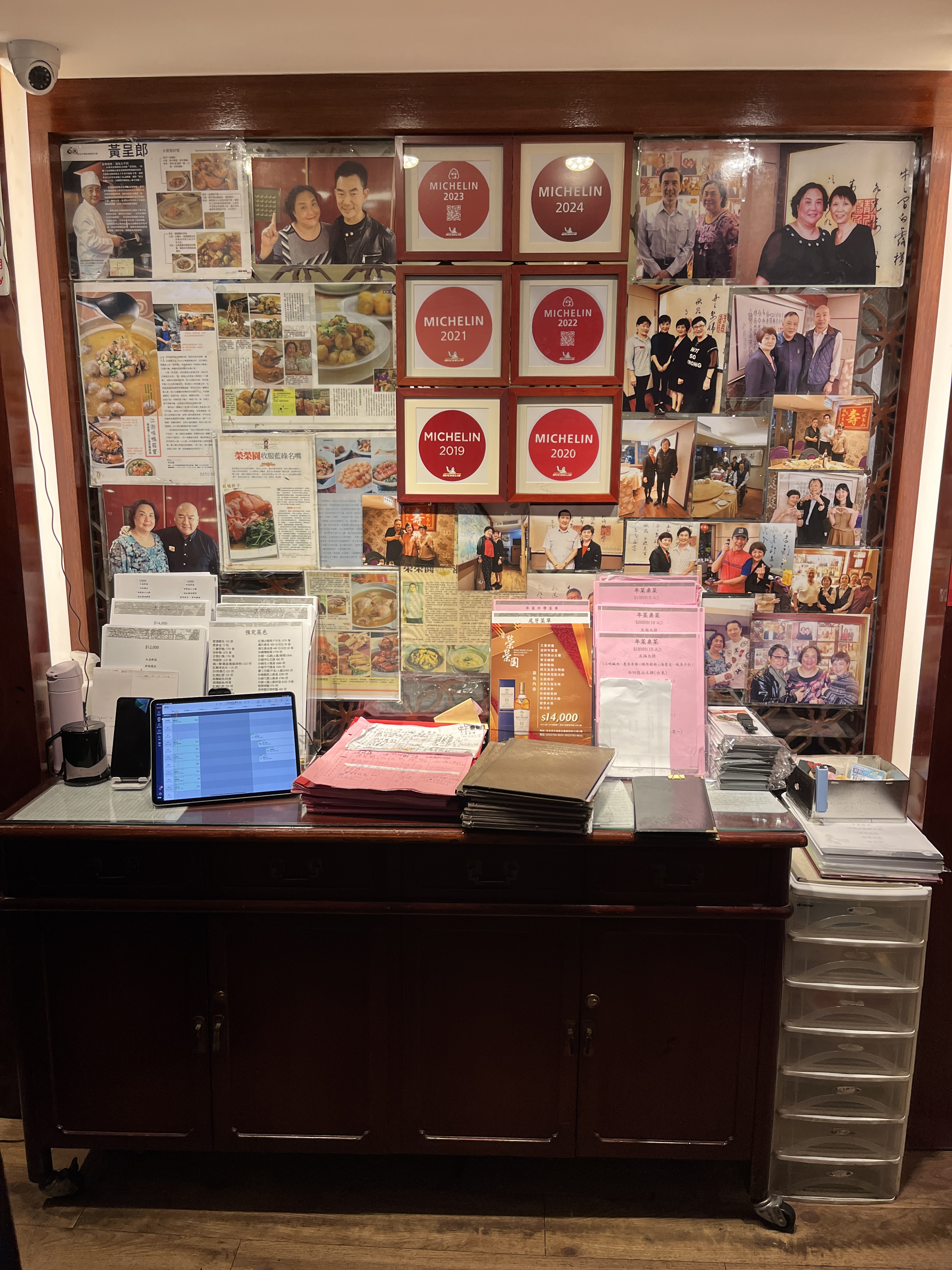
- Interior, 2024

Restaurant information
- Established: 1965
- Food type: Zhejiang (Chinese)
- Location: Taipei, Taiwan

Rong Rong Yuan is a Zhejiang restaurant in the Daan District of Taipei, Taiwan. The business has received Bib Gourmand status in the Michelin Guide.

== Description ==
The restaurant Rong Rong Yuan operates on Xinyi Road in Taipei's Daan District. It has been described as one of the city's most popular Zhejiang restaurants. The menu includes Beggar's chicken, braised pork ribs with guangbing flatbread, oxtail, and dongpo pork with red yeast rice. The restaurant also serves bamboo, pea shoots, and yuanxiao. Seafood options include crabs, eel, fish, scallops, and shrimp.

== History ==
The restaurant opened in 1965. It has received Bib Gourmand status in the Michelin Guide.

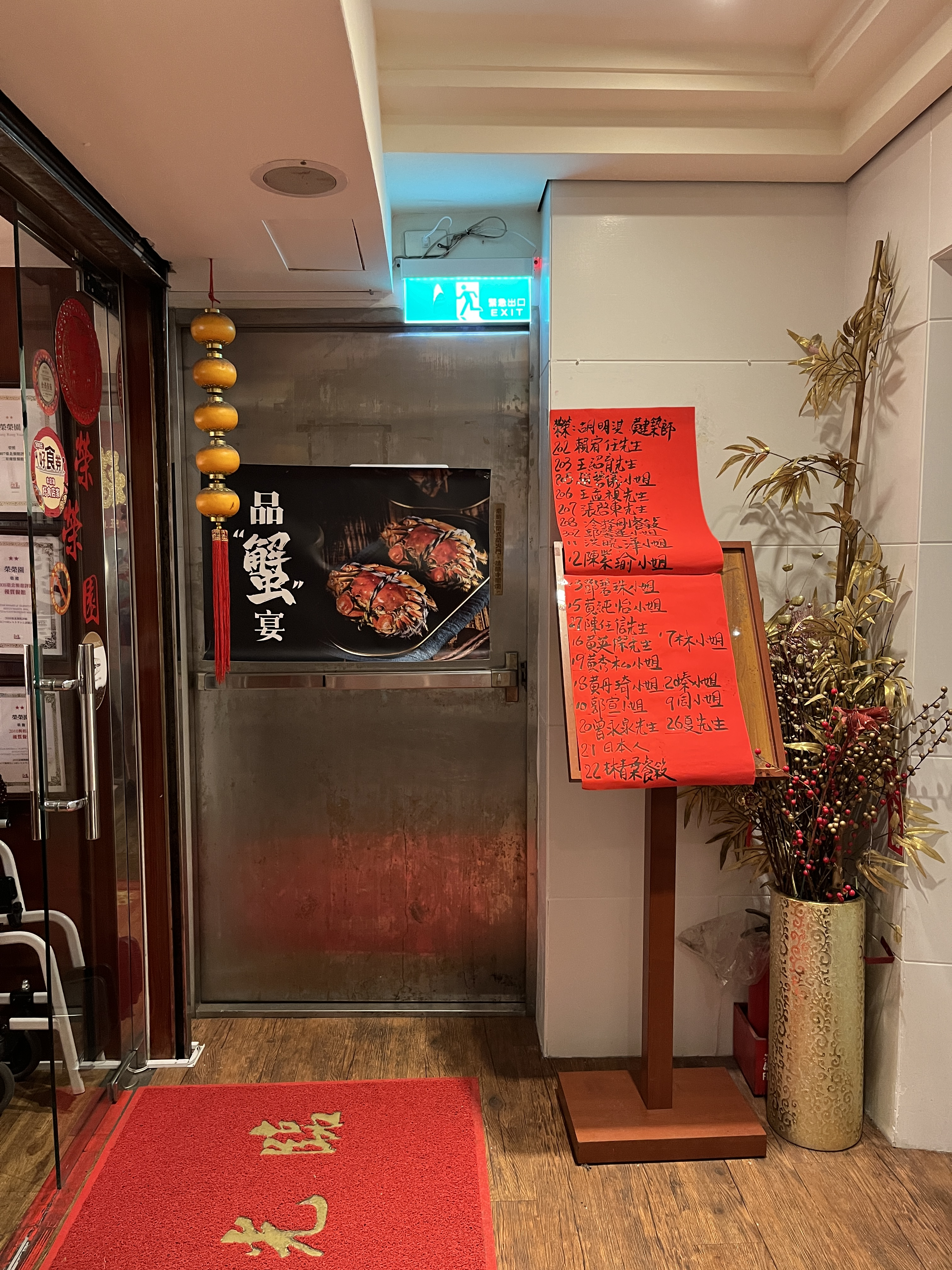

== See also ==
- List of Chinese restaurants
- List of Michelin-starred restaurants in Taiwan
- List of restaurants in Taiwan
