= Yang Bing-yi =

Taiwanese businessman (1927–2023)

Yang Bing-Yi (Chinese: 楊秉彝; 23 March 1927 – 25 March 2023) was a Taiwanese restaurateur. He was the founder of the restaurant chain Din Tai Fung.

== Early life ==
Yang Bing-Yi was born in Yuanping in China's northern Shanxi province in 1927 and immigrated by himself to Taiwan at the age of 20 during the Chinese Civil War in 1948. He took a job to make oil deliveries. When he was 13 years old, Japan occupied his city during the Second Sino-Japanese War. Shortly after the Japanese surrendered in 1945, he went to the county seat to further his education. With the assistance of a matchmaker, he got married at 19 years old to his first wife. After the Chinese Civil War began, Yang feared for his safety. At 21 years old, he took leave from the army, moved to Taiwan under the pretense of studying there, and sought to meet up with his uncle who was living there.

Yang traveled by Hualien Ferry (Chinese: 花蓮輪) to the Port of Keelung in the summer of 1948. After walking through mountains and rivers, he met up with his uncle. His uncle's Shanghai wife connected him to the Shanghai owner of the oil company, Heng Tai Fung (Chinese: 恆泰豐). Surnamed Wang, the owner put him to work on delivering oil during the day. At night, Yang helped Wang's brother, an importer, deliver Shaoxing wine. After two years of working at the oil company, he received a promotion to work at the counter. He dated Lai Penmei (Chinese: 賴盆妹), a woman who took care of the Wang's children. They dated around three or four years before getting married when he was 28 years old. The Wangs officiated their wedding. The newly married couple worked for the Wangs for another three to four years.

== Business career ==
Yang opened a small shop in Taipei with his wife in 1958 and named the store Din Tai Fung Oil Retail. The store had two namesakes: Heng Tai Fung, the company the couple had been employed at, and Din Mei Oils, the company that supplied their oil. They sold cooking oil and steamed Chinese soup dumplings called xiaolongbao. The oil business started to have difficulties with the invention of salad oils in metal tins in 1972, and they decided to devote more of their storefront to dumplings. The dumplings soon became extremely popular and they changed the name to just Din Tai Fung and started to focus on the dumplings and noodles.

The original restaurant was in Taipei's Yongkang shopping district and was named one of the best restaurants in the world by the New York Times in 1993. Franchises expanded his brand to the United States, the United Kingdom, Australia, the United Arab Emirates, South Korea and Singapore. As of 2023, there are more than 170 locations in 13 territories.

== Personal life ==
Yang was an early riser. In his seventies, he typically spent an hour in the morning walking followed by an hour of doing qigong.
