= Good Friend Cold Noodles =

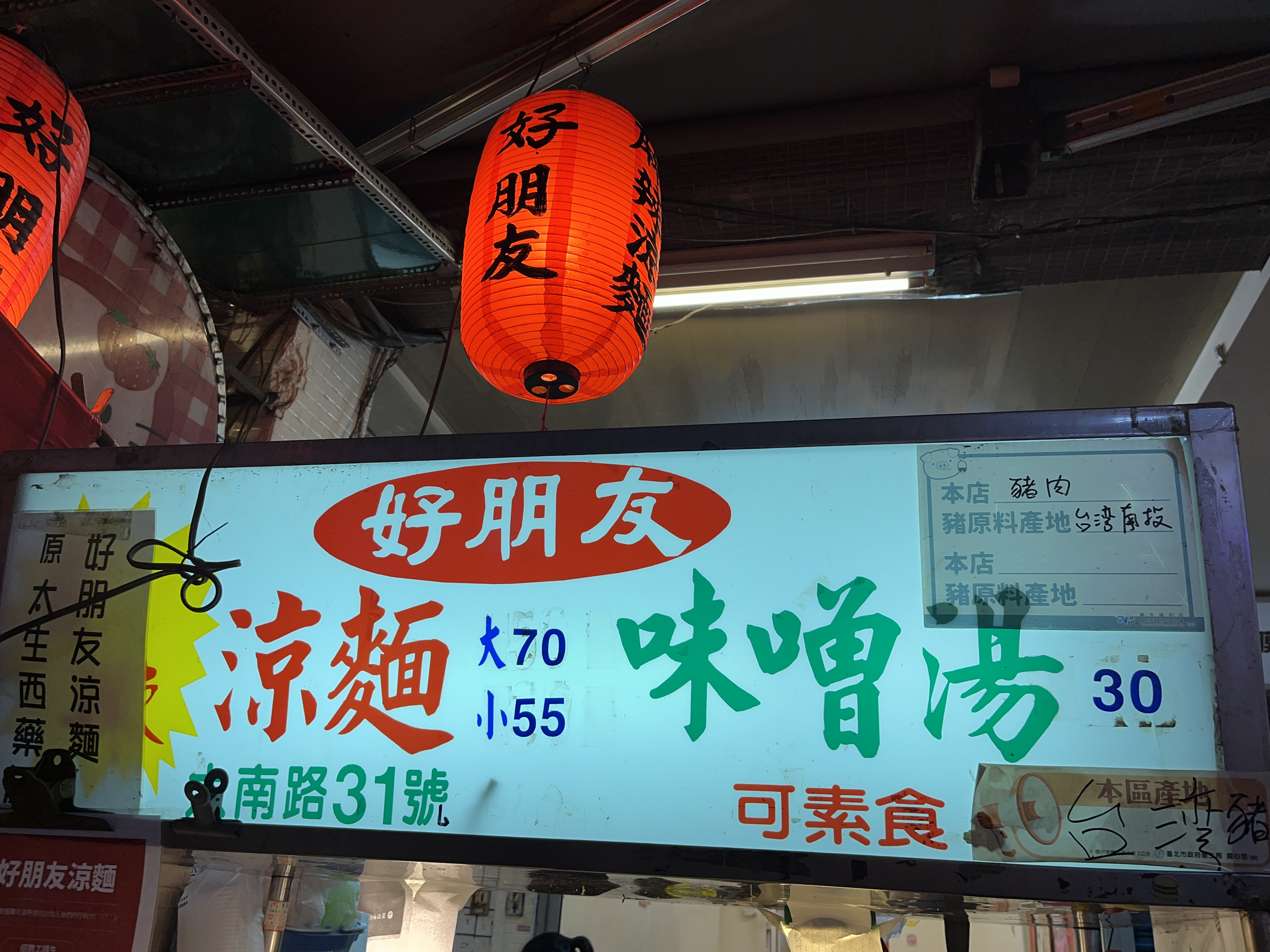
- Sign for the restaurant, 2024

Restaurant information
- Food type: Taiwanese
- Location: Taipei, Taiwan

Good Friend Cold Noodles (朋友涼麵) is a restaurant at Shilin Night Market in the Shilin District of Taipei, Taiwan. It has received Bib Gourmand status in the Michelin Guide.

== Description ==
Good Friend Cold Noodles operates at the Shilin Night Market in Taipei's Shilin District. There is indoor seating. The menu includes a noodle dish with a sesame sauce, pickled cucumber, and mustard greens, as well as a Taiwanese-style miso egg drop soup with eggs.

== Reception ==
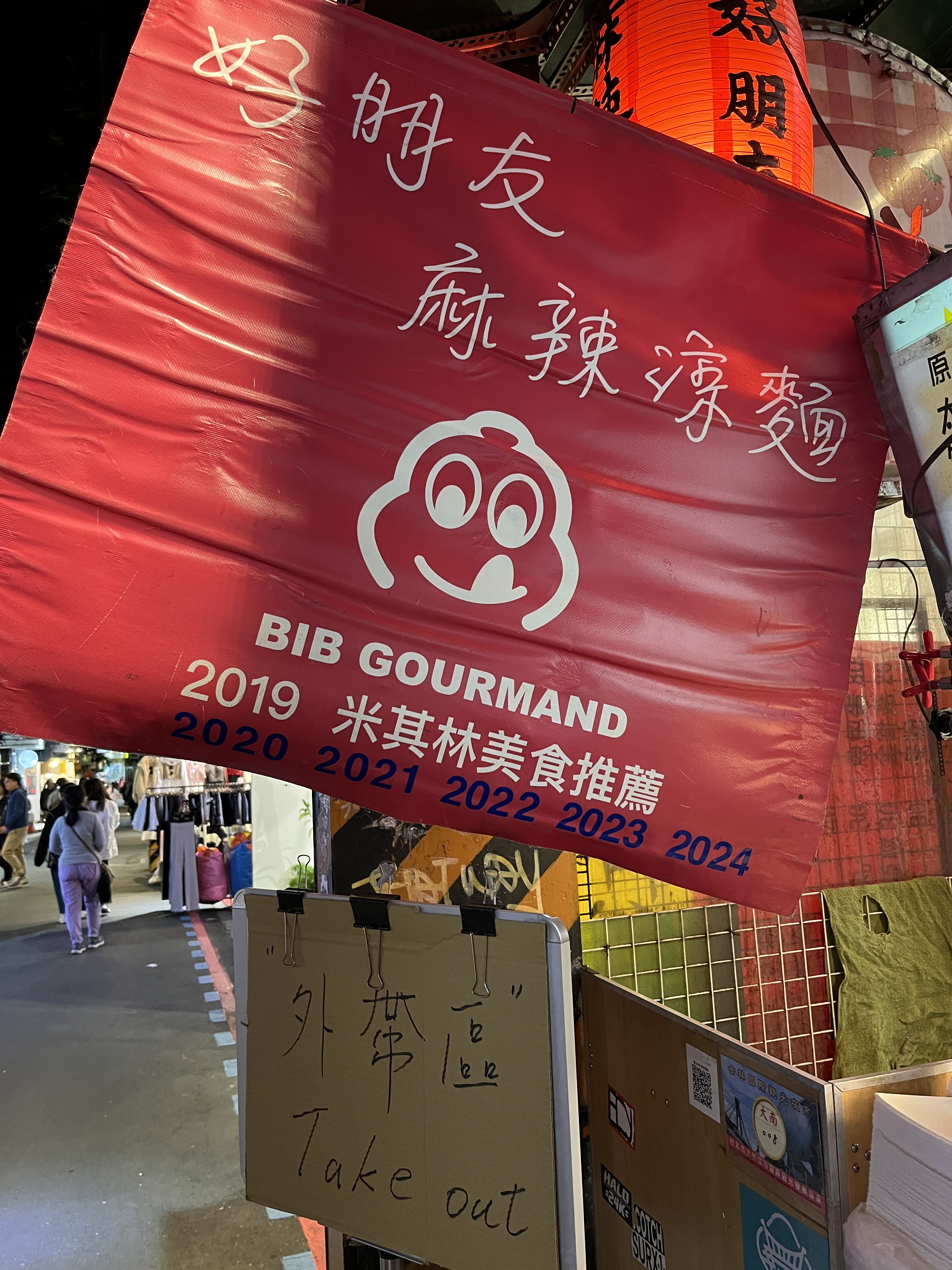
Sign showcasing the restaurant's Bib Gourmand status, 2024

The restaurant has received Bib Gourmand status in the Michelin Guide (2019). Francesca Chang of CommonWealth Magazine said, "Good Friend offers a true, authentic version of [cold noodles] with high-quality ingredients, and be sure to taste their egg drop soup as well." The Manilla Bulletin has said Good Friend serves "an elevated version of simple noodle dishes".

== See also ==
- List of Chinese restaurants
- List of Michelin-starred restaurants in Taiwan
- List of night markets in Taiwan
- List of restaurants in Taiwan
- Night markets in Taiwan
