= Lee Hu Cake Shop =

Taiwanese bakery specialising in Taiwanese pastries

Lee Hu Cake Shop 李鵠餅店
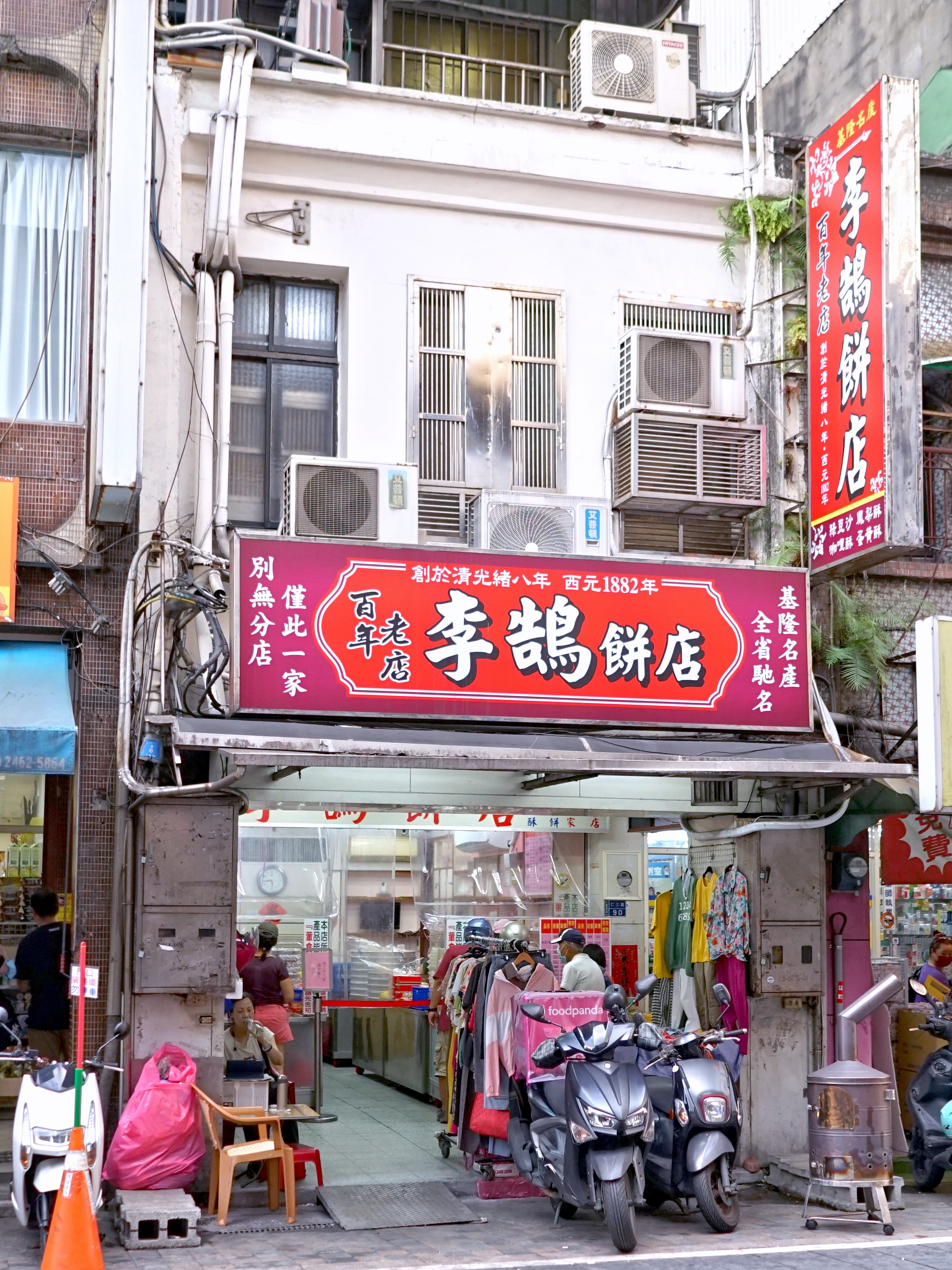
- Industry: Food and beverage
- Founded: 1882; 144 years ago
- Headquarters: Ren-ai District, Keelung, Taiwan
- Area served: local
- Products: pineapple cakes, Lek-tau-phong
- Website: www.lee-hu.com.tw

The Lee Hu Cake Shop (Chinese: 李鵠餅店; pinyin: Lǐ Hú Bǐng Dìan) is a historic bakery in Ren-ai District, Keelung, Taiwan, known for its traditional Taiwanese pastries, particularly pineapple cakes (鳳梨酥) and mung bean pastries (綠豆椪). Established in 1882, it is the oldest bakery in Taiwan.

== See also ==
- List of bakeries
- List of companies of Taiwan
- 85C Bakery Cafe
