= Leputing =

Restaurant in Da'an, Taipei, Taiwan

- 樂埔町
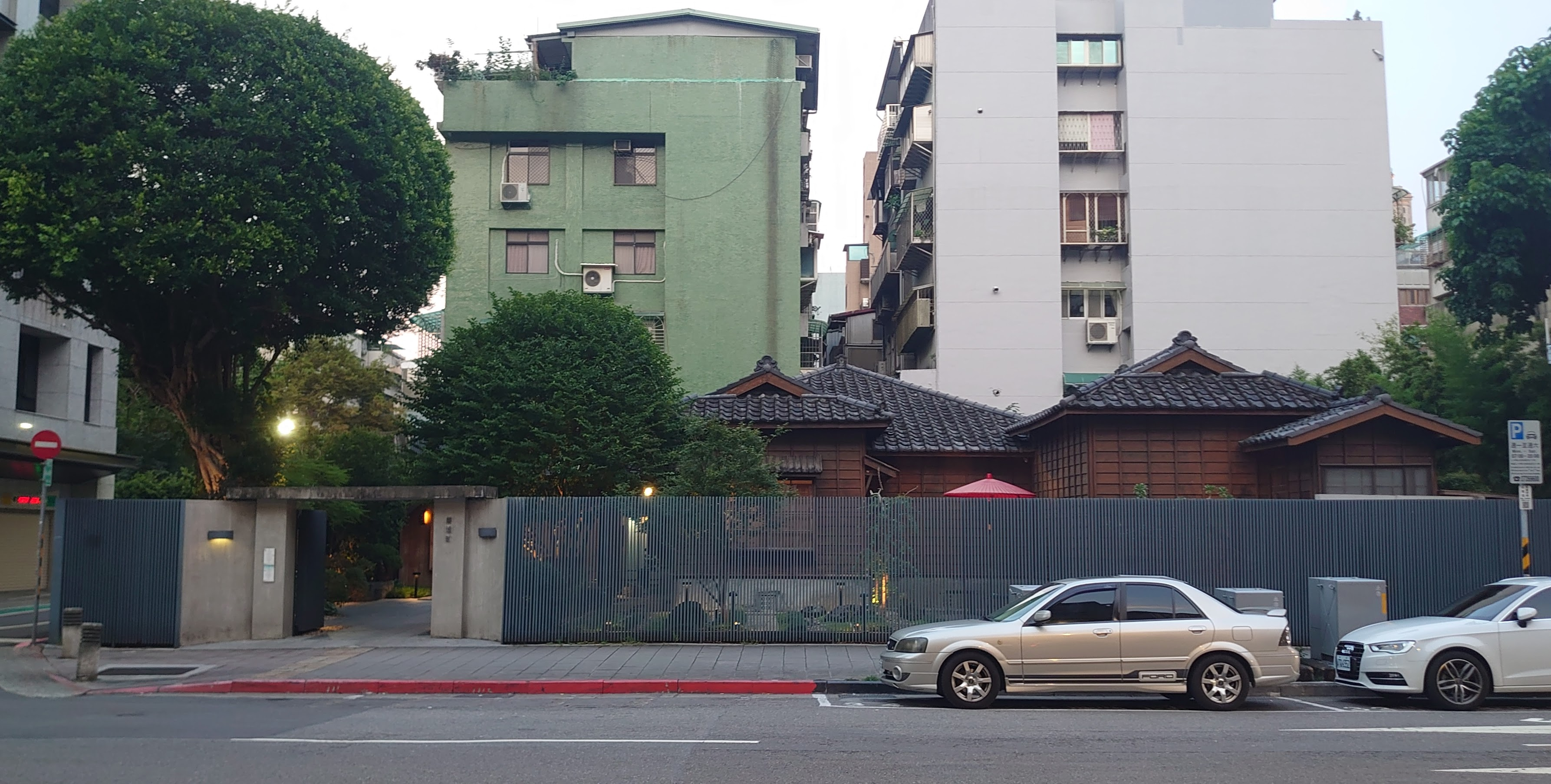
- Interactive map of the Leputing area
- Alternative names: 錦町日式宿舍─杭州南路2段67號

General information
- Type: Restaurant
- Location: Taipei, Taiwan, 67 Section 2 Hangzhou South Road, Daan District
- Coordinates: 25°01′47.1″N 121°31′20.3″E
- Current tenants: Lead Jade Life & Culture
- Completed: 1920s
- Owner: Taipei City Government

The Leputing (traditional Chinese: 樂埔町; simplified Chinese: 乐埔町; pinyin: Lèbùtīng) is a restaurant in Da'an District, Taipei, Taiwan.

== History ==
The restaurant building used to be the dormitory used by the officials of Forestry Bureau of the Japanese government constructed in the 1920s. In 2013, the Department of Cultural Affairs of the Taipei City Government appointed Lead Jade Life & Culture to manage the abandoned building. Restoration works then commenced for 1.5 years.

== Architecture ==
The 1-story restaurant building was constructed with Nishikicho Japanese-style architecture. It spreads over an area of 600 m^{2}.

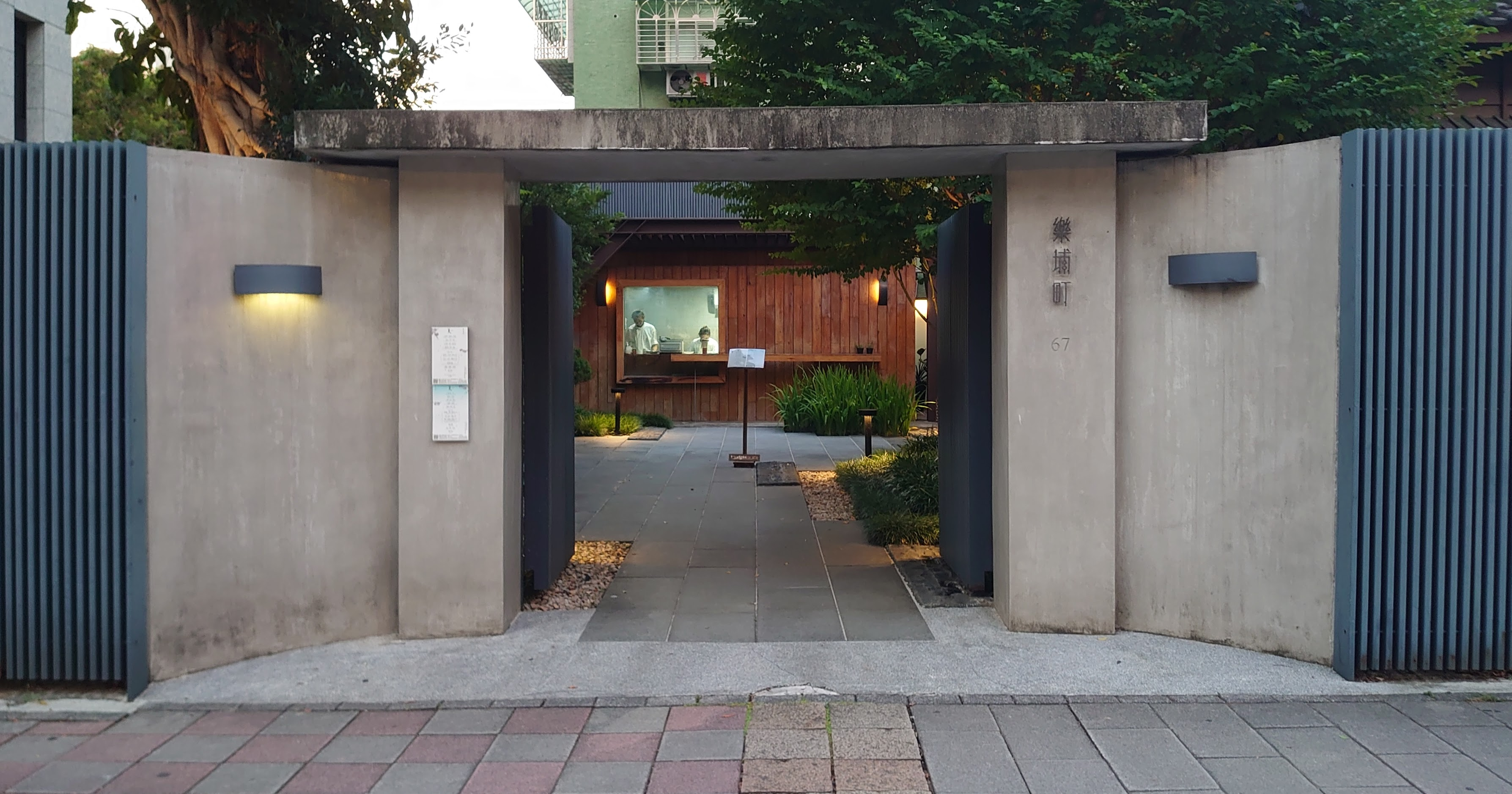
Entrance of Leputing

== Transportation ==
The restaurant is accessible within walking distance north from Guting Station of Taipei Metro.

== See also ==
- Taiwanese cuisine
