= Din Tai Fung =

Taiwanese restaurant chain

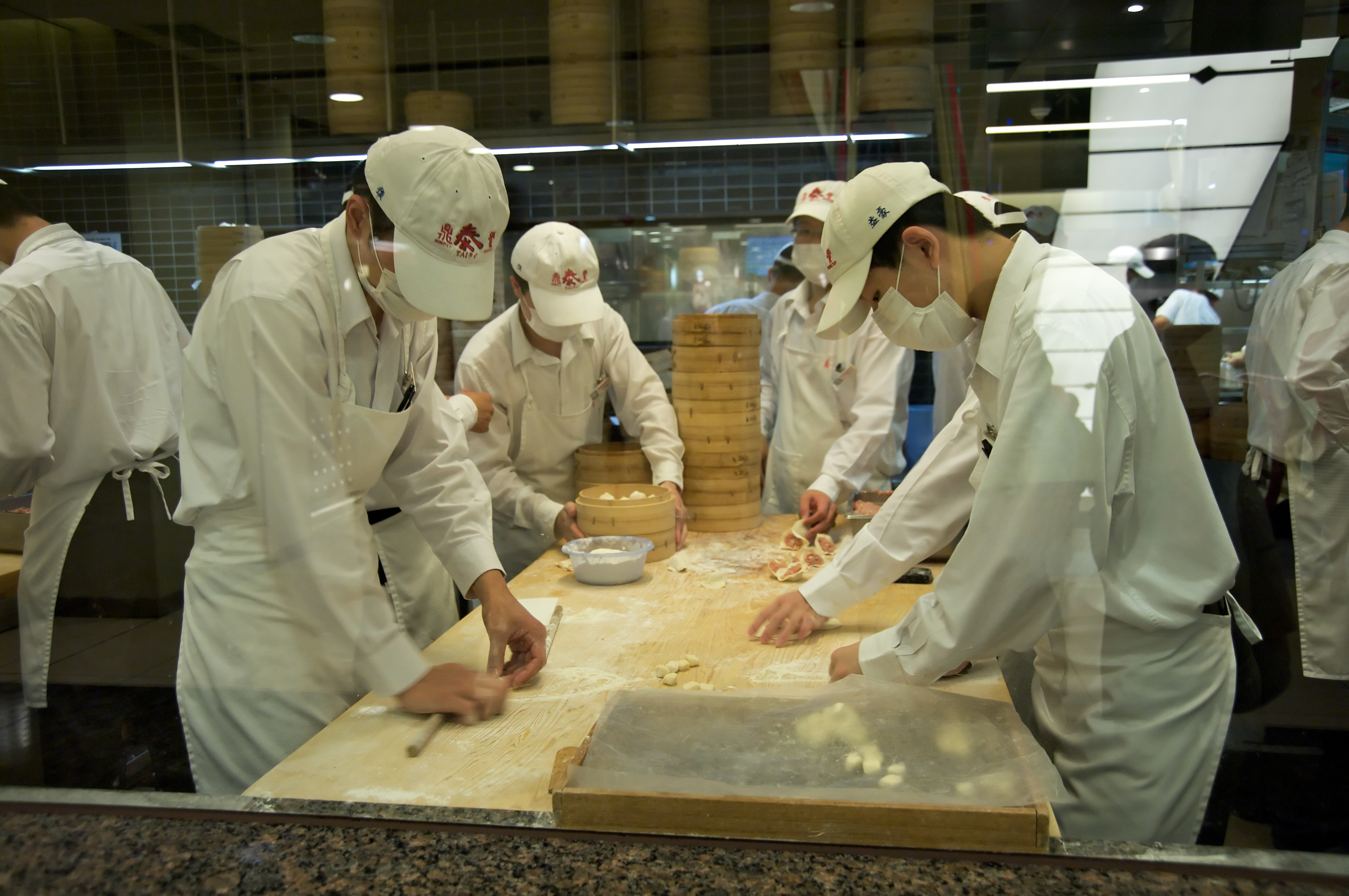
- Xiaolongbao made to order at the restaurant behind glass pane
- Native name: 鼎泰豐
- Type: Chinese cuisine
- Industry: Restaurant
- Founded: 1958
- Founder: Yang Bing-yi
- Headquarters: Taipei, Taiwan
- Area served: Asia, UK, UAE, North America
- Products: Xiaolongbao
- Website: www.dintaifung.com.tw

Din Tai Fung
- Traditional Chinese: 鼎泰豐
- Simplified Chinese: 鼎泰丰
Transcriptions
Standard Mandarin
- Hanyu Pinyin: Dǐng Tài Fēng
- Gwoyeu Romatzyh: Diing Tay Feng
- Tongyong Pinyin: Dǐng Tài Fong
Hakka
- Romanization: Dinˋ Tai Fungˊ
- Pha̍k-fa-sṳ: Tín-thai-fûng
Southern Min
- Hokkien POJ: Téng-thài-hong
- Tâi-lô: Tíng-thài-hong

Din Tai Fung (Chinese:鼎泰豐/鼎泰丰) is a Taiwanese restaurant chain specializing in Chinese cuisine, particularly famous for its xiaolongbao. Based in Taipei, Taiwan, Din Tai Fung also has branches in Hong Kong, Indonesia, Japan, Macau, China, Malaysia, the Philippines, Singapore, South Korea, Thailand, the United Arab Emirates, the United Kingdom, United States, and Canada.

== History ==
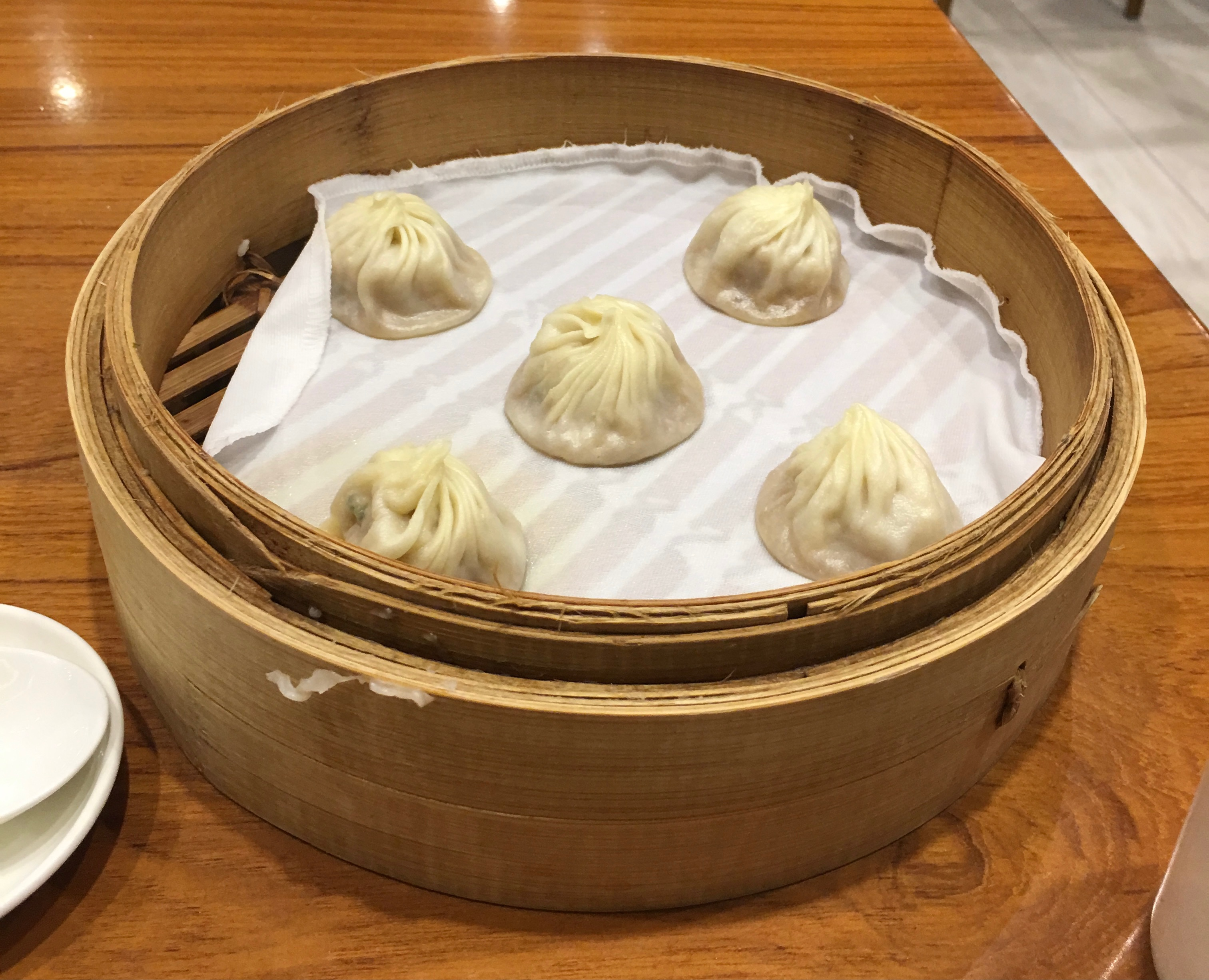
Truffle-infused Xiaolongbao at Din Tai Fung, Taipei

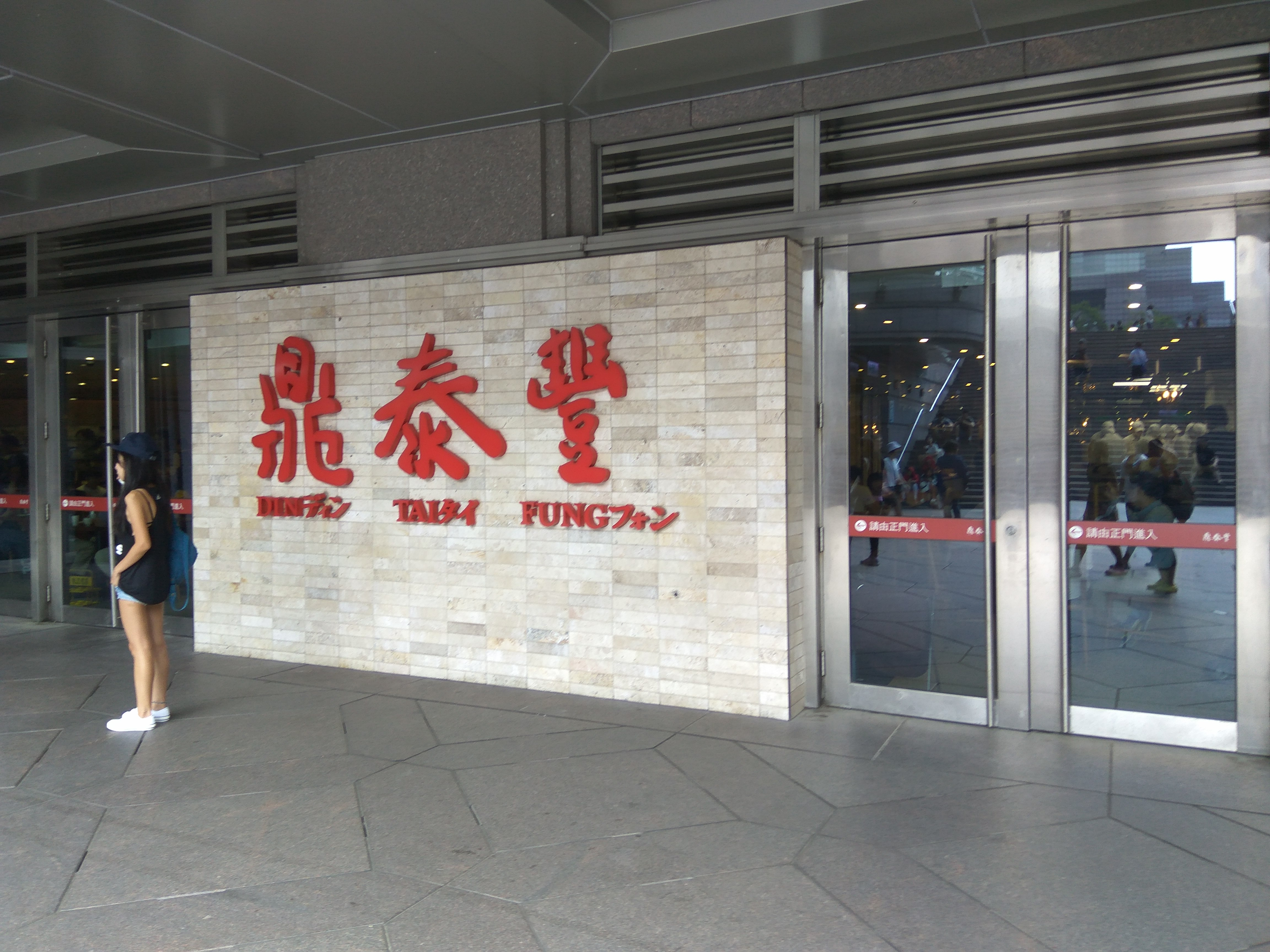
Din Tai Fung in Taipei 101

Founder Yang Bing-yi, an immigrant from Shanxi, initially worked ten years at Heng Tai Fung, a cooking oil retailer in Taiwan. Yang later wanted to branch out on his own to support his family. With his Hakka wife, Lai Penmei, he founded a cooking oil retailer in 1958. They named it Din Tai Fung by combining the names of Yang's previous employer, "Heng Tai Fung", and their new supplier, "DinMei Oils".

Around 1970, tinned cooking oil became prevalent, and business diminished drastically. Tang Yongchang, the immigrant owner of a Shanghainese restaurant and friend of Yang suggested that in order to survive, Yang should convert half the shop to making and selling xiaolongbao. The xiaolongbao were a common dish in Tang's native Shanghai, but rare in Taiwan. The xiaolongbao eventually grew so popular that Din Tai Fung stopped selling oil altogether and became a full-fledged restaurant in 1972. The original restaurant is on Xinyi Road in Taipei and the shop sign was a calligraphic work of the then Control Yuan president Yu Youren.

In 1996, the first international location opened in Tokyo, and the first North American store opened in Arcadia, California, in 2000. The California location, rather than franchised, was operated by the founders' son Frank. Their first branch in Indonesia opened at the upmarket shopping mall Plaza Senayan in Jakarta on April 24, 2005. As of 2022, there were 13 branches spread across the Greater Jakarta area, with three outlet formats (regular Din Tai Fung, Noodle Bar, and Chef's Table) and halal or non-halal selections available. In 2008, the chain struggled due to the world financial situation.

The Taiwanese government hosted a Din Tai Fung showcase in Paris in 2007 as a tool of cultural diplomacy. In 2000, the chain's first locations opened in mainland China.

The first European branch was opened in London in December 2018. In January 2019, Din Tai Fung voluntarily closed their Westfield Sydney location after discovering rats, which nearby construction had displaced. The city council also required the restaurant to pass health inspections before re-opening.

=== COVID-19 pandemic and after ===
Due to the impact of the COVID-19 pandemic on the restaurant industry in the United States, the first North American restaurant closed permanently on 11 June 2020.

In March 2023, a Din Tai Fung Australia franchise was prosecuted by the Federal Court of Australia for underpaying staff, pressuring employees to sign an Australian workplace agreement, and failing to pay approximately A$175,000 in owed wages.

As of 2024, the chain has more than 170 locations, and its North American operations are handled by the grandsons of the founders who serve as co CEOs. In 2024, the chain opened its first New York location—its largest at 25,000 square feet, with a seating capacity of 450—in the location of the former Mars 2112. In April 2024, Din Tai Fung was fined $4 million AUD for underpaying Australian workers and left Australia.

Din Tai Fung also opened a location in the Downtown Disney of Disneyland in Anaheim, California.

Din Tai Fung's first Canadian location opened in May 2025 in Vancouver, British Columbia.

New locations are planned to open in Scottsdale, Arizona, and Brooklyn, New York City.

== Locations ==
Country	Number of locations	Reference
Canada	1 (Vancouver)	
China	23 (Guangzhou 2, Hangzhou 1, Hong Kong 4, Macau 2, Nanjing 1, Ningbo 1, Shanghai 8, Shenzhen 2, Suzhou 1, Wuxi 1)	
Indonesia	14	
Japan	28	
Malaysia	15	
Philippines	11	
Singapore	26	
South Korea	6 (Busan 1, Seoul 4, Suwon 1)	
Taiwan	12 (Hsinchu 1, Kaohsiung 1, New Taipei City 1, Taichung 1, Taipei 8)	
Thailand	5 (Bangkok 4, Phuket 1)	
United Arab Emirates	7 (Abu Dhabi 1, Dubai 6)	
United Kingdom	4 (London 4)	
United States	17 (California 9, Nevada 1, New York 1, Oregon 2, Washington 4)	
Total worldwide	165	

== Reputation ==
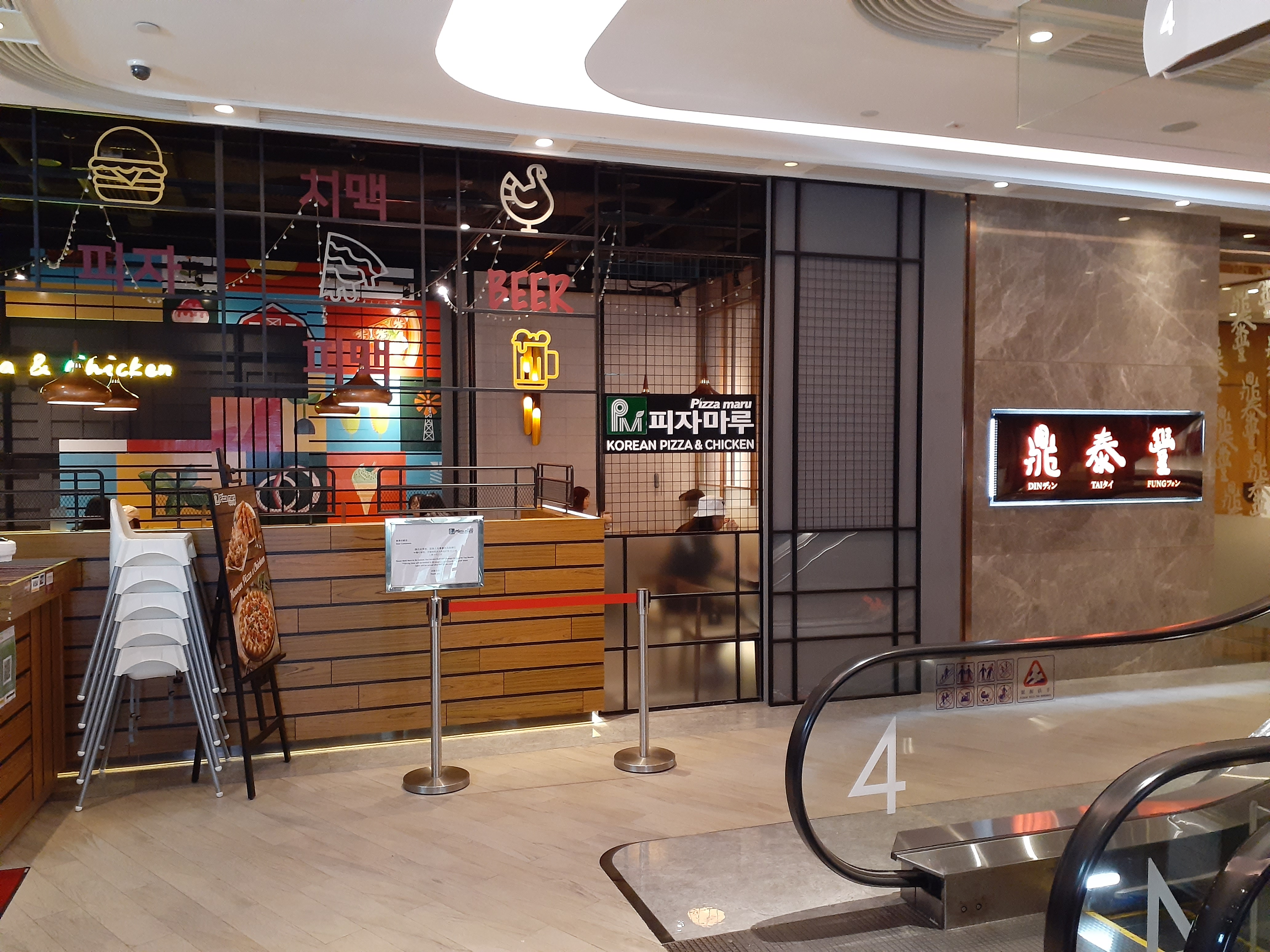
Din Tai Fung in Hong Kong

Din Tai Fung is known internationally for its paper-thin wrapped xiaolongbao with 18 folds. In November 2009, the Hong Kong and Macau 2010 edition of the Michelin Guide awarded the restaurant's first Hong Kong branch at Tsim Sha Tsui, Silvercord Branch, a Michelin star. The Michelin Guide recommended the restaurant's second branch in Hong Kong at Causeway Bay, Yee Wo Branch, in December 2010, as well as Hong Kong's Silvercord Branch in 2013.

Australian Federal Court Justice Anna Katzmann stated in 2024 concerning long-standing labour code violations: “It involved a calculated scheme to rob employees of their hard-earned wages and deceive the authorities, by which I mean at least the [Fair Work] Ombudsman, the Department of Home Affairs and the Australian Taxation Office.”

In June 2025 Seattle's Din Tai Fung restaurants agreed to pay $567,361 USD in restitution to 1,245 current and former employees over allegations of wage theft and for not providing proper rest and meal breaks to its staff.

== See also ==
- List of Chinese restaurants
- List of restaurants in China
- List of restaurants in London
- List of restaurant chains in Australia
- List of companies of Taiwan
- Bafang Dumpling
