= Bafang Dumpling =

Taiwanese restaurant chain

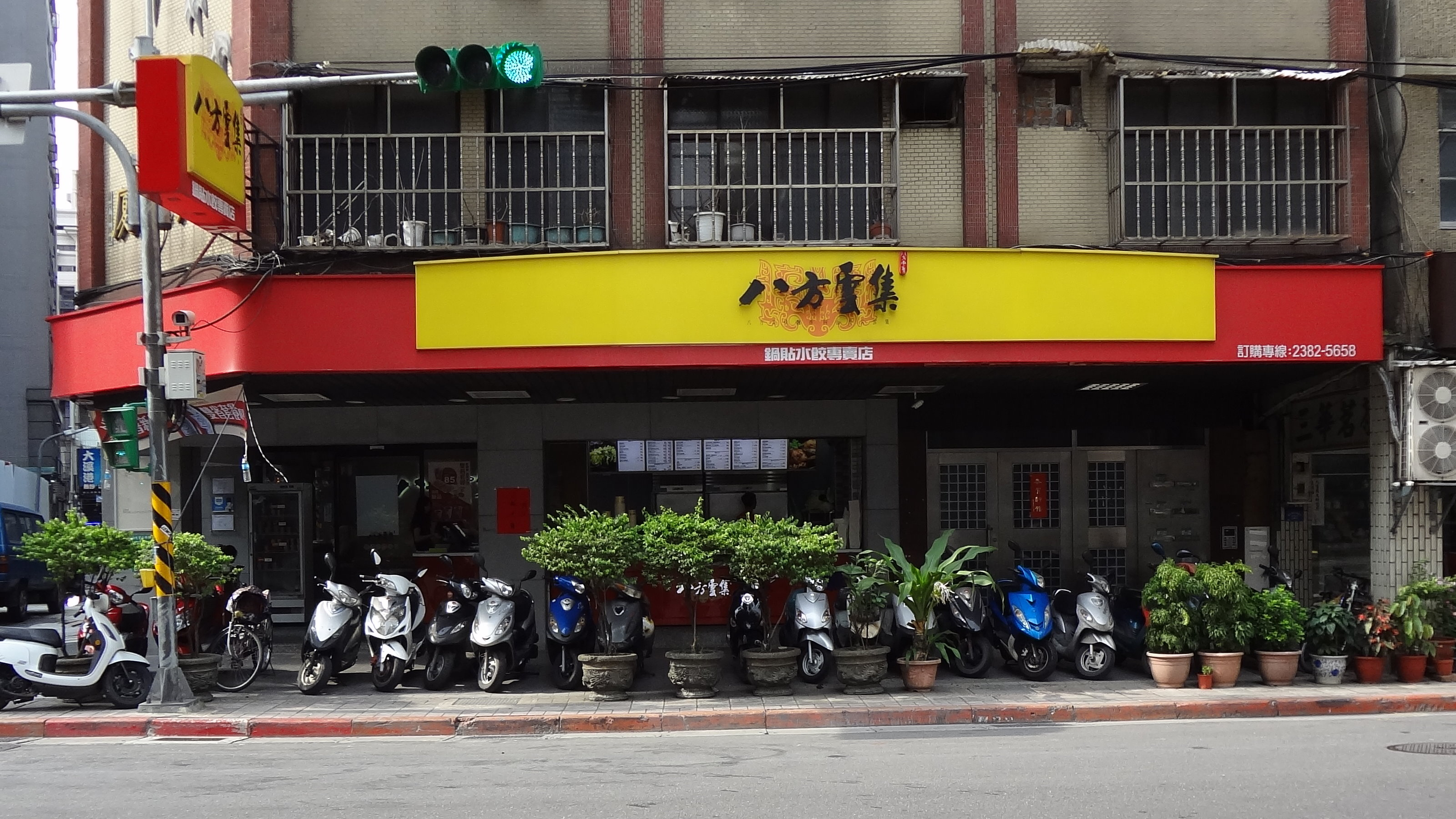
- A Bafang Dumpling store in Wanhua District, Taipei
- Native name: 八方雲集
- Company type: Public
- Traded as: TWSE: 2753
- Industry: Restaurant
- Founded: 1998
- Founder: Lin Jiayu
- Headquarters: Taipei, Taiwan
- Number of locations: 1,414 stores (2024)
- Area served: Hong Kong; United States; Taiwan
- Products: Dumplings; potstickers
- Website: bafangdumpling.com

Bafang Dumpling is a Taiwanese restaurant chain that, outside Taiwan, also has branches in Hong Kong and the United States. The company exited the mainland Chinese market in December 2022.

== History ==
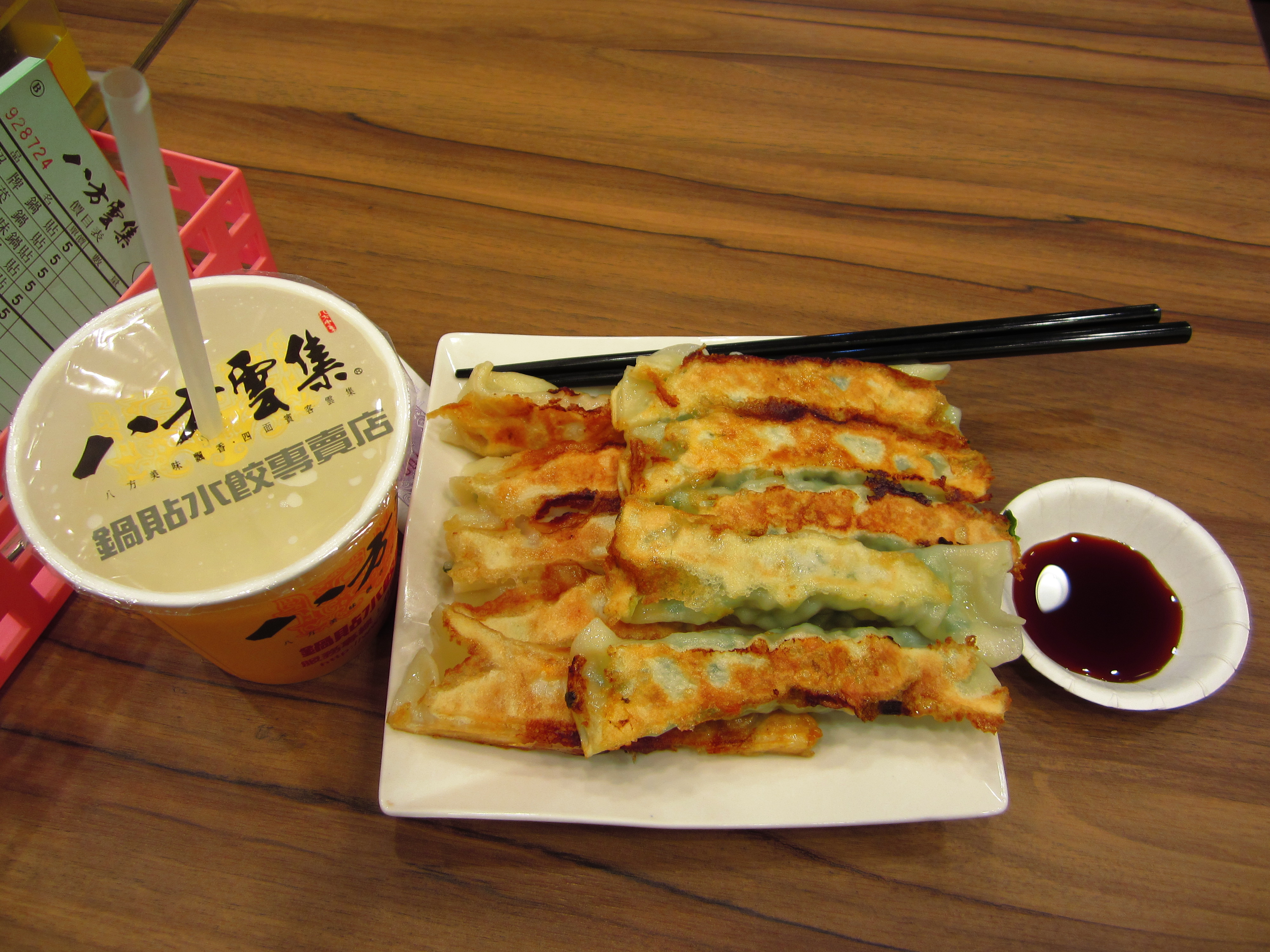
Potstickers and soy milk at Bafang Dumpling

Founded in 1998 in Tianmu, Taipei, Taiwan, by Lin Jiayu, Bafang Dumpling is a restaurant chain that specializes in dumplings and potstickers as its main products. In 2008, it expanded to Hong Kong, and in 2014, it opened a location in mainland China. In September 2021, Bafang Yunji International Co., Ltd. became a publicly traded company in Taiwan. On 26 March 2022, the first store in the United States opened in the City of Industry, California. As of May 2022, there were 998 stores in Taiwan and 1,100 worldwide.

In November 2022, it was announced that Bafang Dumpling would exit the Chinese market and shutter all of its 17 stores, located throughout Fujian province.

In 2026, Bafang Dumpling launched plans to expand into Texas, with its first location being in Carrollton.

== See also ==
- List of restaurants in Taiwan
- List of companies of Taiwan
- Din Tai Fung
