= J&G Fried Chicken =

Fried chicken chain based in Taichung, Taiwan

- Industry: restaurant
- Founded: 1973; 52 years ago in Ximending, Taipei
- Headquarters: Taichung, Taiwan
- Key people: Huang Zhixiong (CEO)
- Products: Taiwanese fried chicken
- Parent: J&G Group (香繼光)
- Website: www.jgssg.com.tw/en

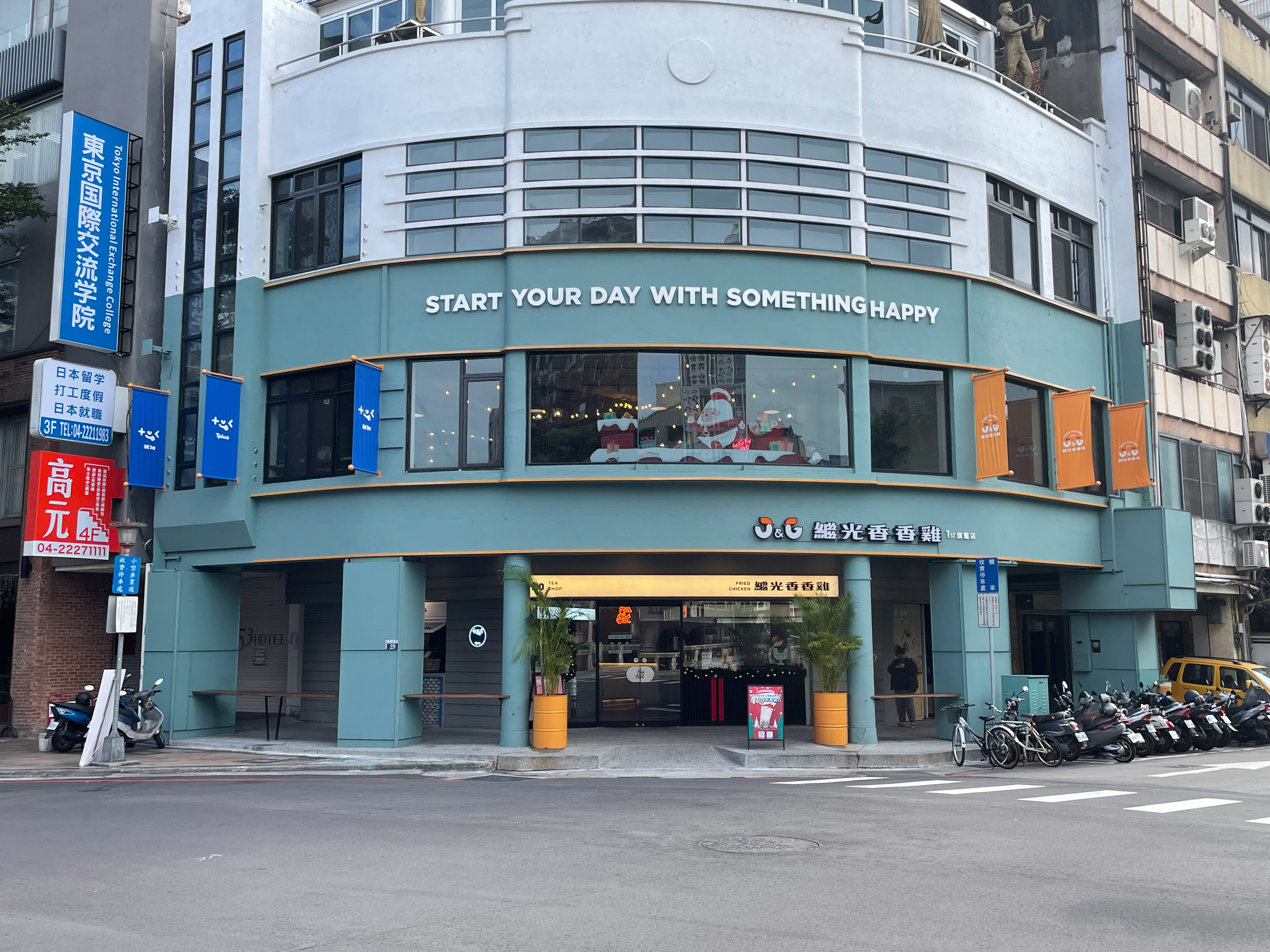
J&G Fried Chicken flagship store

J&G Fried Chicken (Chinese: 繼光香香雞; pinyin: Jìguāng Xiāngxiāngjī) is a Taiwanese fried chicken brand based in Taichung, Taiwan. The chain's namesake is Jiguang Street in Central District, Taichung.

J&G started in 1973 as a food stall within a wet market in Taipei's Ximending neighborhood, but its current recipe was not developed until 1979. In the 1980s, the stall was moved to Jiguang Street in Taichung. J&G became a chain store in the early 2000s, and later transitioned into a fast casual restaurant in the 2010s. As of January 2019, the chain has 326 restaurants in Taiwan, Hong Kong, Malaysia, and Canada. Its flagship store is located at the corner of Zhongshan Road and Luchan East Road in Taichung, a few blocks away from its original location.

Though the store specializes in fried dishes, some stores also sell lu wei and bubble tea.

== See also ==
- TKK Fried Chicken
