= TKK Fried Chicken =

Taiwanese fried chicken chain

T.K.K. Fried Chicken
- Industry: Food
- Founded: 20 July 1974; 51 years ago
- Headquarters: New Taipei City, Taiwan
- Area served: Worldwide
- Key people: 史桂丁 Shih Kwei-ting, founder 史洪法 Shih Hung-fah, CEO
- Products: Fried chicken, roasted chicken, sweet potato fries, soft drinks, biscuits, desserts
- Website: tkkinc.com.tw/main.asp

TKK Fried Chicken (Chinese: 頂呱呱; pinyin: Dǐngguāguā) is a Taiwanese chain of fried chicken restaurants. TKK opened its first restaurant on 20 July 1974, in Ximending located in Taipei City and has since expanded to locations throughout the world. On 2 November 2013, TKK opened its first gastropub, TKK the BAR, in the Eastern District of Taipei to serve items from the original menu as well as other products exclusive to the bar, thereby becoming one of the only few fried chicken restaurants in the world to also operate a gastropub.

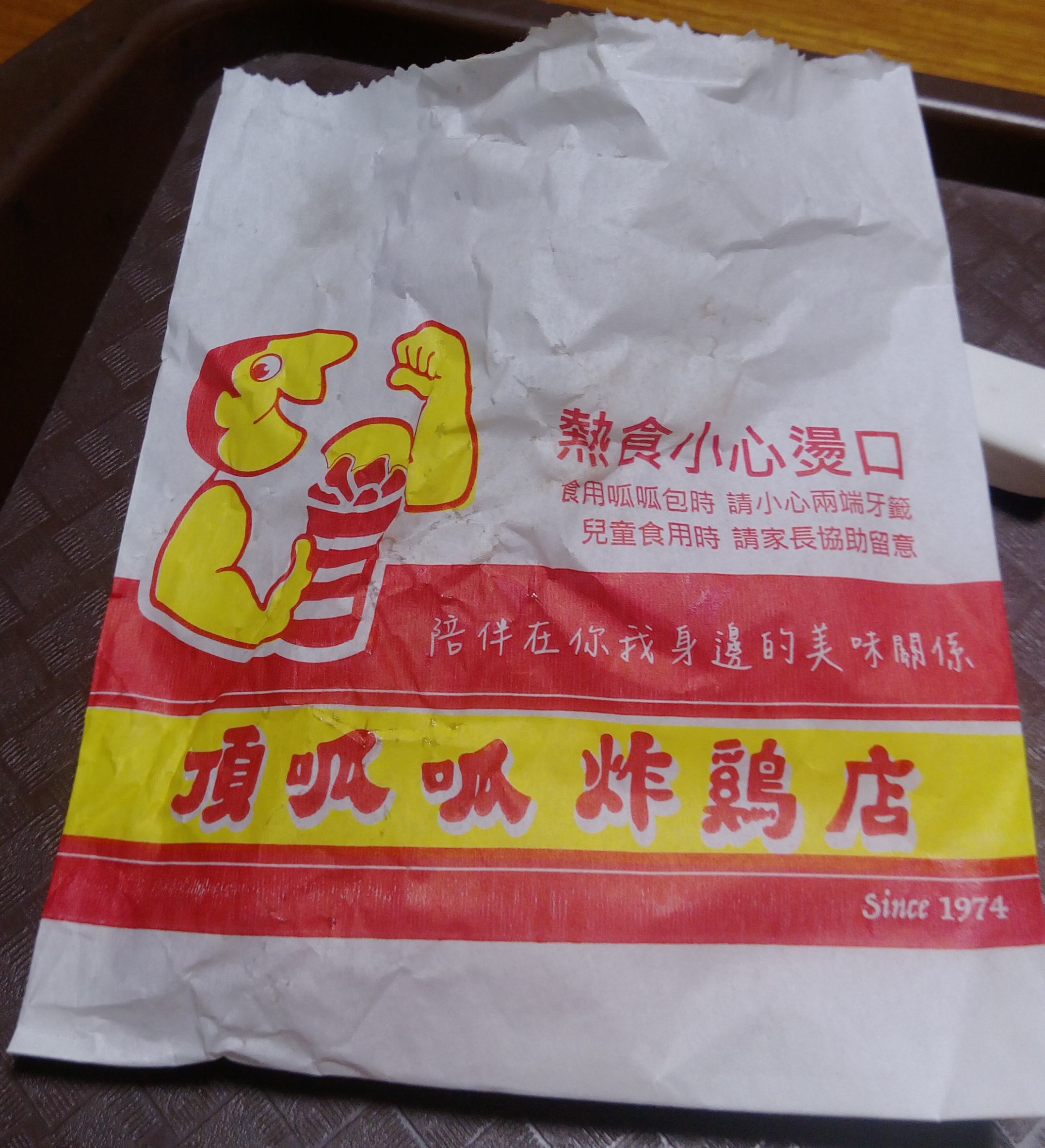
Paper bag (wrinkled) from TKK Fried Chicken, Taiwan

== Locations ==
- Taiwan - 49
- United States - 33
- China - 10
- Malaysia - 1

== See also ==
- J&G Fried Chicken
