= 85°C Bakery Cafe =

Taiwan-based retail food chain

Gourmet Master Co. Ltd

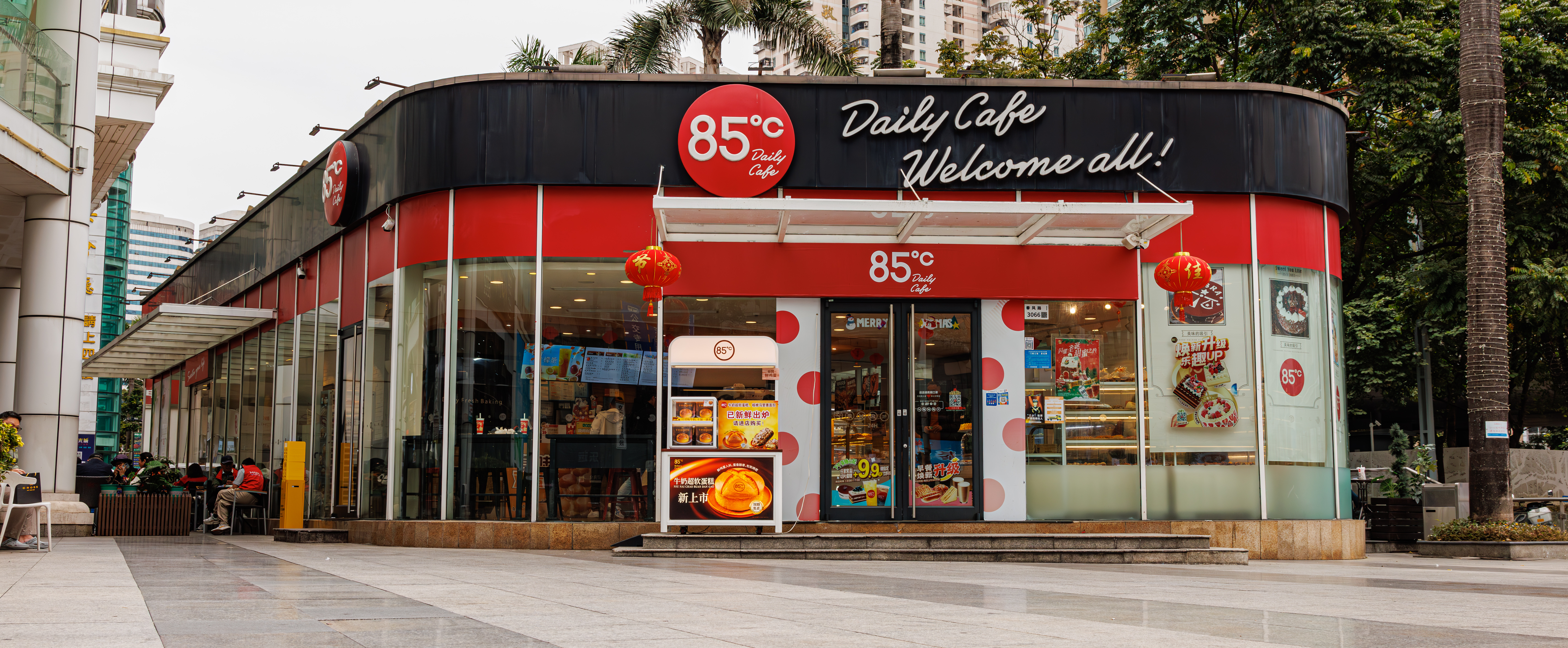
- Cafe in Shenzhen
- Traded as: TWSE: 2723
- Industry: Food and Beverage Franchising
- Founded: 2004; 22 years ago
- Headquarters: Taichung, Taiwan
- Number of locations: China: 538 shops Taiwan: 400 shops United States: 59 shops Australia: 12 shops Hong Kong: 8 shops
- Area served: Worldwide
- Key people: Wu Cheng-hsueh (吳政學(Pe̍h-ōe-jī: Ngô͘ Chèng-ha̍k))
- Revenue: NT$23,018,413,000元 (2017)
- Website: Chinese: China, Taiwan, Hong Kong www.85cafe.com English: Australia www.85cafe.com.au United States www.85cbakerycafe.com

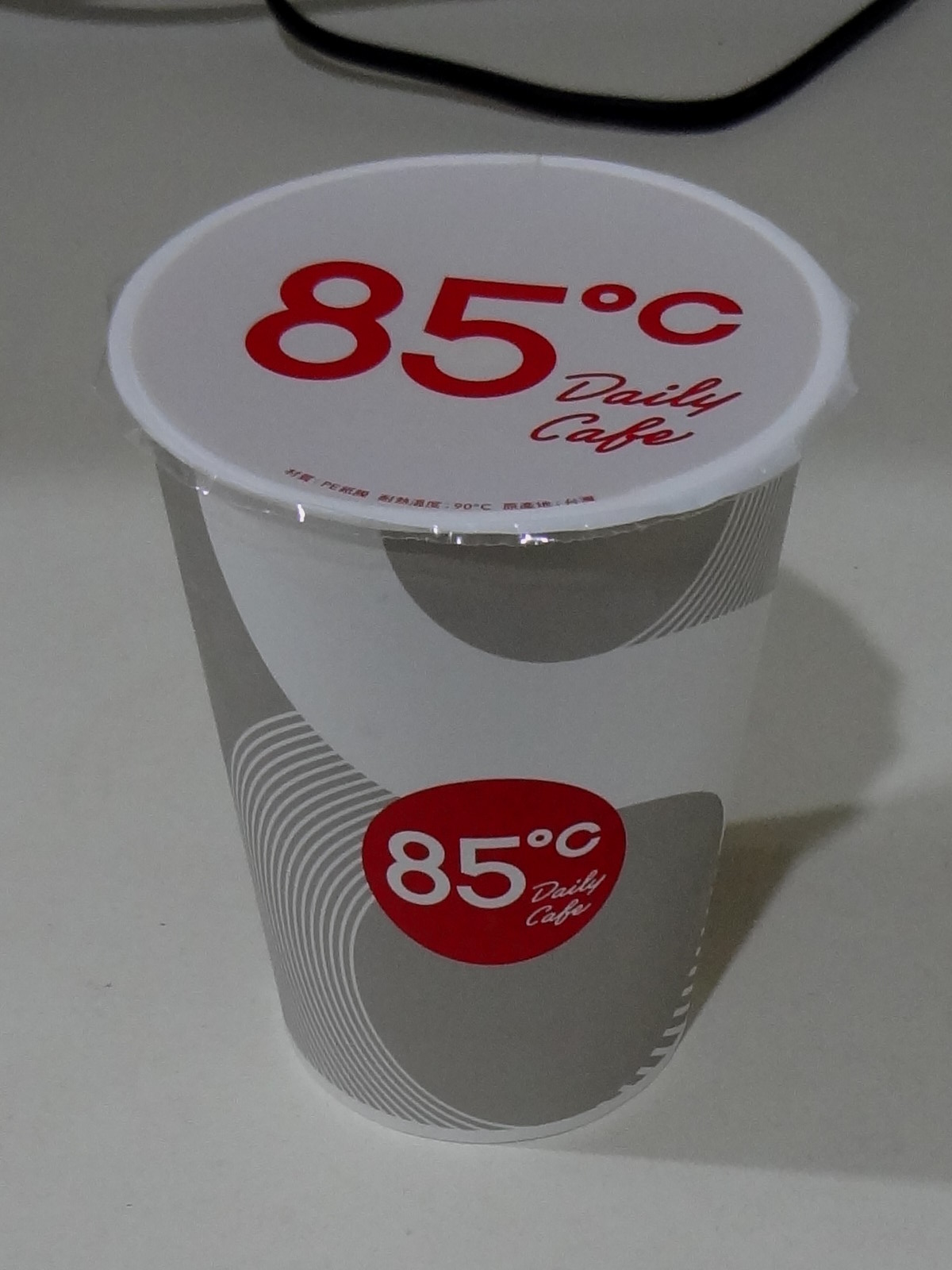
A small cup of ice coffee from 85 °C Bakery Café

85 °C Bakery Cafe, also brand-named 85 Cafe, 85 °C Daily Cafe, or 85 Degrees C (Chinese: 85度C; pinyin: Bāshíwǔ Dù C; Pe̍h-ōe-jī: Poeh-cha̍p-gō͘--tō͘ C), is a Taiwanese international chain of retailers selling coffee, tea, and cakes, as well as desserts, smoothies, fruit juices, souvenirs, and bakery products. It has 1000 retail shops worldwide. The chain's parent company (Gourmet Master Co. Ltd) is located in the Cayman Islands.

== History ==
Wu Cheng-hsueh incorporated the company in January 2003 and opened the first shop in Bao-Ping, Taipei County (now New Taipei), in July 2004. The name "85 °C" refers to Wu's belief that 85 °C (185 °F) is the optimal temperature to serve coffee.

In September 2006, the company opened its first overseas store in Sydney, Australia. A year later, the first store in China was opened in Shanghai. The first store in Hong Kong was opened in 2012, the first store in the United States in 2008, in Irvine. The US central kitchen began operations in September 2013. In March 2017, the chain's United States central kitchen in Brea, California, became its first solar-powered facility worldwide.

In 2016, 67% of the chain's revenue came from China, while 18% came from Taiwan. In 2013, the average US store generated more than US$700,000 in monthly sales, seven times more than an average store in China.

The chain is known for their sea salt coffee, made by sweetening their iced Americano and adding a sea salt whipped cream on the top. This coffee has been featured on NPR. The concept of this drink supposedly came from the Taiwanese habit of sprinkling salt on fruit to bring out the sweetness.

== Gourmet Master Co. Ltd ==
Group structure and statistics of Gourmet Master Co. Ltd., as of 31 December 2017, with hyperlinks to the International Consortium of Investigative Journalists (ICIJ) Offshore Leaks Database.

In China, 85 °C Bakery Cafe stores are advertised as being from Taiwan, but the chain's main company (Gourmet Master Co. Ltd) is registered in the Cayman Islands. Because this mother company is registered in the Cayman Islands, R.O.C. laws do not apply. After being established in Taiwan in 2004 and undergoing equity restructuring in September 2009, the mother company became listed on the Taiwan Stock Exchange in November 2010 under the statute of a foreign company of first listing (thus designated as an "F share," with the "F" denoting "Foreign").

Because the company is listed as an "F share", Wu Cheng-hsueh and other major shareholders pay 20% marginal tax rate on the dividends they receive instead of the top marginal tax rate of 40% they would have to pay as shareholders in a Taiwanese company. In the 2011 fiscal year, for example, such dividends received by Wu Cheng-hsueh amounted to more than NT$10 million in tax revenues lost to the Taiwanese government.

Furthermore, because Gourmet Master Co. Ltd is registered in and retains profits in the low-tax haven Cayman Islands, in 2010, for example, Taiwan lost NT$167 million in corporate taxes which tax agencies otherwise would have been able to collect if the pre-tax profit had been fully reported by a company in Taiwan.

When the company became publicly listed on the Taiwan Stock Exchange in November 2010, it had 3.85 million shares in its IPO.

== Controversies ==
=== United States ===
In August 2018, a Los Angeles branch of Taiwanese-owned 85 °C Bakery Cafe served Taiwan president Tsai Ing-wen and gave her an "enthusiastic welcome". Chinese customers of branches in mainland China called for a boycott. Boycott supporters characterized the chain as "trying to rake in Chinese money" while "supporting Taiwanese independence". 85 °C Bakery Cafe posted a statement on its Chinese website that the company has "firm support for the 1992 Consensus" and stating the company's "belief that the two sides of the Strait are one family".

The chain's statement "distancing itself from pro-independence sentiments" angered Taiwanese people, who accused 85 °C of "bowing to Chinese pressure".

=== Mainland China ===
In 2017, Shanghai's market supervision department found that the so-called "pork floss bread" sold in Shanghai at 85 °C was not actually made with pure pork floss, but rather was made of "pork floss powder" and contained both pork and pea powder. The department believed that this behavior violated the Consumer Protection Law of the People's Republic of China and imposed a fine of Renminbi 150,000.

=== Taiwan ===
On 24 July 2015, the newspaper China Times reported that a green tea of a retail store in Taoyuan, Taiwan, analyzed by the Department of Public Health of that city during a sampling event, contained 4.7 times as much bacteria as what would be allowed according to the standard set by that department. This may have been due to poor sanitation or quality of ingredients or inappropriate handling during the production process.

In 2008, the "95 Youth Labor Union" investigated 50 stores of 85 °C Bakery Cafe, of which 32 were found to be involved in unlawful practices. Among them, 22 stores were in violation of wage regulations and 29 were employing uninsured workers.

=== Australia ===
From 2009 to October 2014, in Sydney, Australia, 85 °C Bakery Cafe paid four workers (three Taiwanese nationals on Working Holiday Visas and one PRC Chinese exchange student) only 56% of the lawful minimum wage. The Australian Fair Work Ombudsman ordered 85 °C Bakery Cafe to reimburse the workers for a total of A$42775 it would have paid them had they been employed working for the minimum wage they would be legally entitled to. In January 2021 this enforceable undertaking was allegedly breached in a new claim by the Fair Work Commission which cites a fake student trainee program was a scheme to underpay foreign workers. In 2024, The Australian Fair Work Ombudsman secured 1.44 million in penalties against 85 Degrees franchisor for "systematic failure to ensure compliance within its franchise network"

== See also ==
- List of coffeehouse chains
- List of companies of Taiwan
