= Caffè crema =

Coffee drink

Caffè crema (lit. 'cream coffee') may be one of two different coffee drinks:

- An old name for espresso (1940s and 1950s).
- A long espresso drink served primarily in Germany, Switzerland and Austria and northern Italy (1980s onwards), along the Italian/Swiss and Italian/Austrian border. In Germany it is generally known as a "Café Crème" or just "Kaffee" and is generally the default type of black coffee served, unless there is a filter machine.

As a colorful term it generally means "espresso", while in technical discussions, referring to the long drink, it may more narrowly be referred to as Swiss caffè crema. There is also Italian iced crema di caffè of crema (fredda) al caffè.

Variant terms include crema caffè and the hyperforeignism café crema – café crème. is the direct French translation, but in France it contains dairy. Caffè and crema are Italian; thus café crema mixes French and Italian.

== Synonym for espresso ==
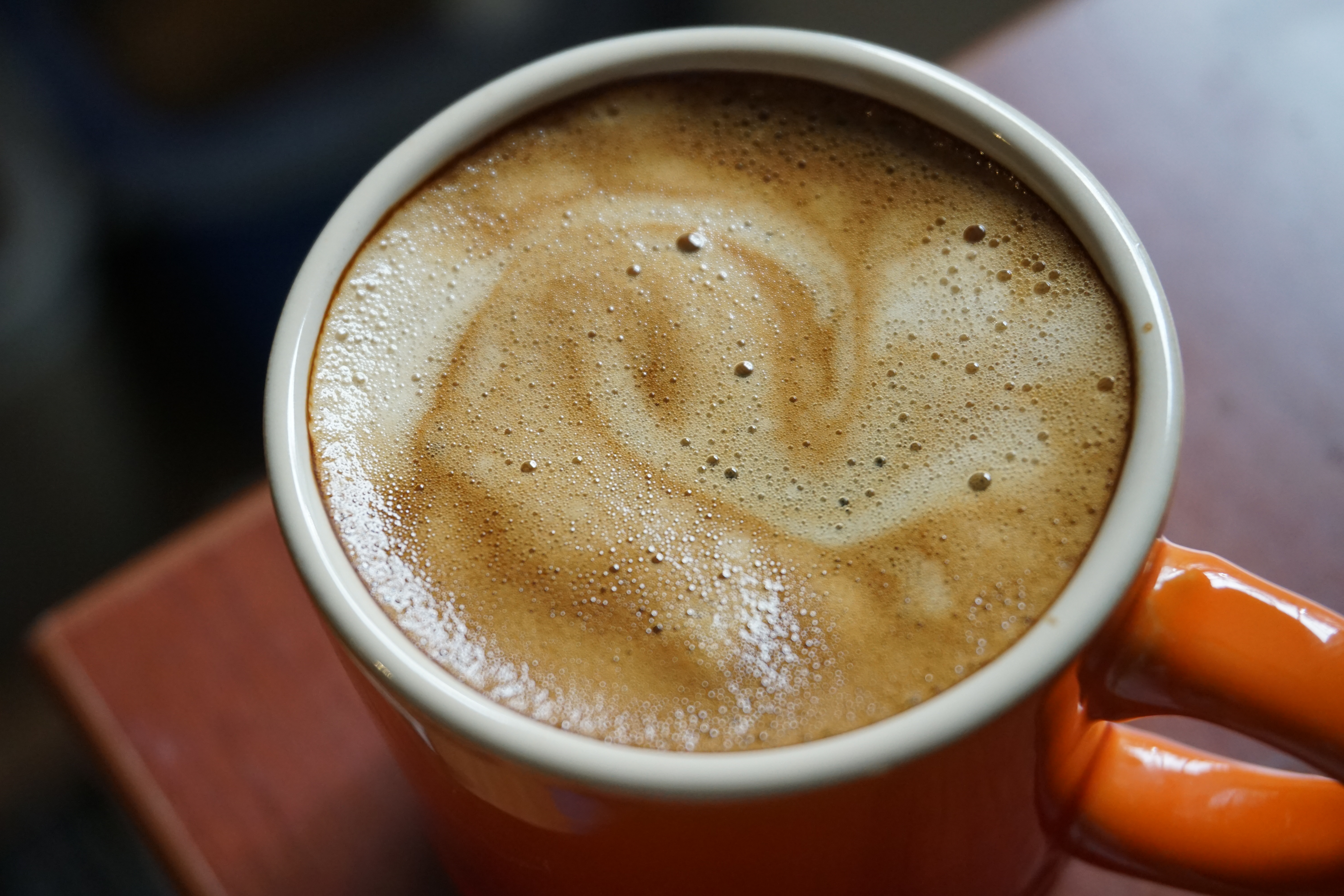
Crema foam can take on multiple colors and appearances.

"Caffè crema", and the English calque "cream coffee", was the original term for modern espresso, produced by hot water under pressure, coined in 1948 by Gaggia to describe the light brown foam (crema) on espresso. The term has fallen out of use in favor of "espresso".

As a colorful synonym for "espresso", the term and variants find occasional use in coffee branding, as in "Jacobs Caffè Crema" and "Kenco Café Crema".

== Swiss drink ==
The term "caffè crema" also refers to a long espresso drink, popular since the 1980s in Switzerland and northern Italy. It is generally served as the standard "café traditionnel" in Belgium. It is produced by running 180–240 millilitres (6.3–8.4 imp fl oz; 6.1–8.1 US fl oz) of water when brewing an espresso, primarily by using a coarser grind. It is similar to a caffè americano or a long black, except that these latter are diluted espresso, and consist of making ("pulling") a normal (short) espresso shot and combining it with hot water. By contrast, a caffè crema extracts differently, and thus has a different flavor profile.

As a long, brewed rather than diluted, espresso, caffè crema is the long end of the ristretto – normale – lungo – caffè crema range, and is significantly longer than a lungo, generally twice as long. Rough brewing ratios of ristretto, normale, lungo, and caffè crema are 1:2:3:6 – a doppio ristretto will be approximately 1 oz/30 ml (crema increases the volume), normale 2 oz/60 ml, lungo 3 oz/90 ml, and caffè crema 6 oz/180 ml. However, volumes of caffè crema can vary significantly, from 4–8 oz (120 ml–240 ml) for a double shot, depending on how it is brewed and taste, and there is no widely agreed standard measure in the English-speaking world. In terms of solubles concentration, a caffè crema is approximately midway between a lungo and non-pressure brewed coffee, such as drip or press.

The motivation for the caffè crema is that it produces a traditional large cup of coffee, just as brewed coffee does: the small size of espresso is due to the original Gaggia lever espresso machine of 1948 requiring manual pressure, and thus a single (solo) espresso of 30 millilitres (1.1 imp fl oz; 1.0 US fl oz) was the maximum that could practically be extracted. The development of pump-driven espresso in the 1961 Faema removed this restriction, but by then a taste had developed for the short espresso, and these continued to be produced on the new machines, long caffè crema only emerging in the 1980s.

The caffè crema is not a common drink in the English-speaking world and is virtually never available in cafés because of the need to significantly change the grind compared to standard espresso. Cafés instead serve Americanos or long blacks. The caffè crema was briefly used in Australia in the 1980s, but was replaced by the long black.

=== Brewing method ===
As the caffè crema is very uncommon in the English-speaking world, and not widely available outside of home brewing, there are few English-language resources on how to brew it, nor consistency in what precisely is understood by this. What is generally done is to coarsen the grind, but otherwise extract in much the same way as espresso, stopping the shot when it blonds, as is usual for espresso – the coarser grind resulting in greater volume, but the extraction taking approximately the same time (25–30 seconds). Some variants include tamping less or extracting for slightly longer (35–40 seconds), and coarser grinds generally result in less mass of grinds fitting into a given filter basket, leading some to prefer using triple-shot baskets to allow sufficient coffee.

One can make a caffè crema in a commercial setting by using the existing filter grind, which is approximately correct, in the espresso machine and otherwise brewing normally, but this would be a very unusual request.

== Crema caffè ==
In Italy, during the summer, traditional cafés (called bar, without final s, in Italian) commonly serve an iced, creamy variant of espresso called crema caffè, crema fredda di caffè, caffè del nonno and so on. This requires a special spinning apparatus making it constantly creamy, without ice scales. It can be served straight or with panna ("milk cream").

== See also ==
- List of coffee beverages
- List of hot beverages
