= Ristretto =

Short shot of espresso coffee

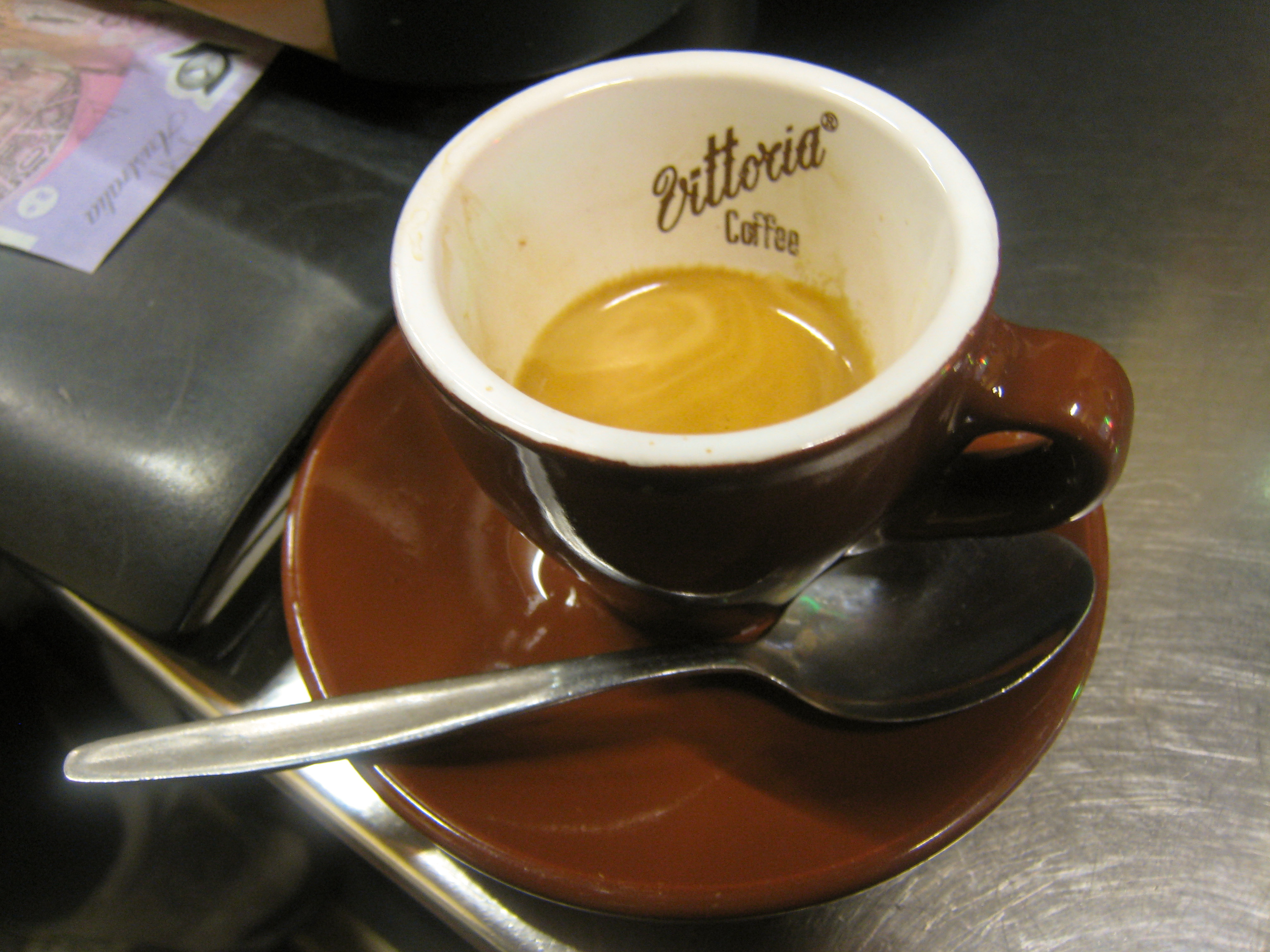
Ristretto

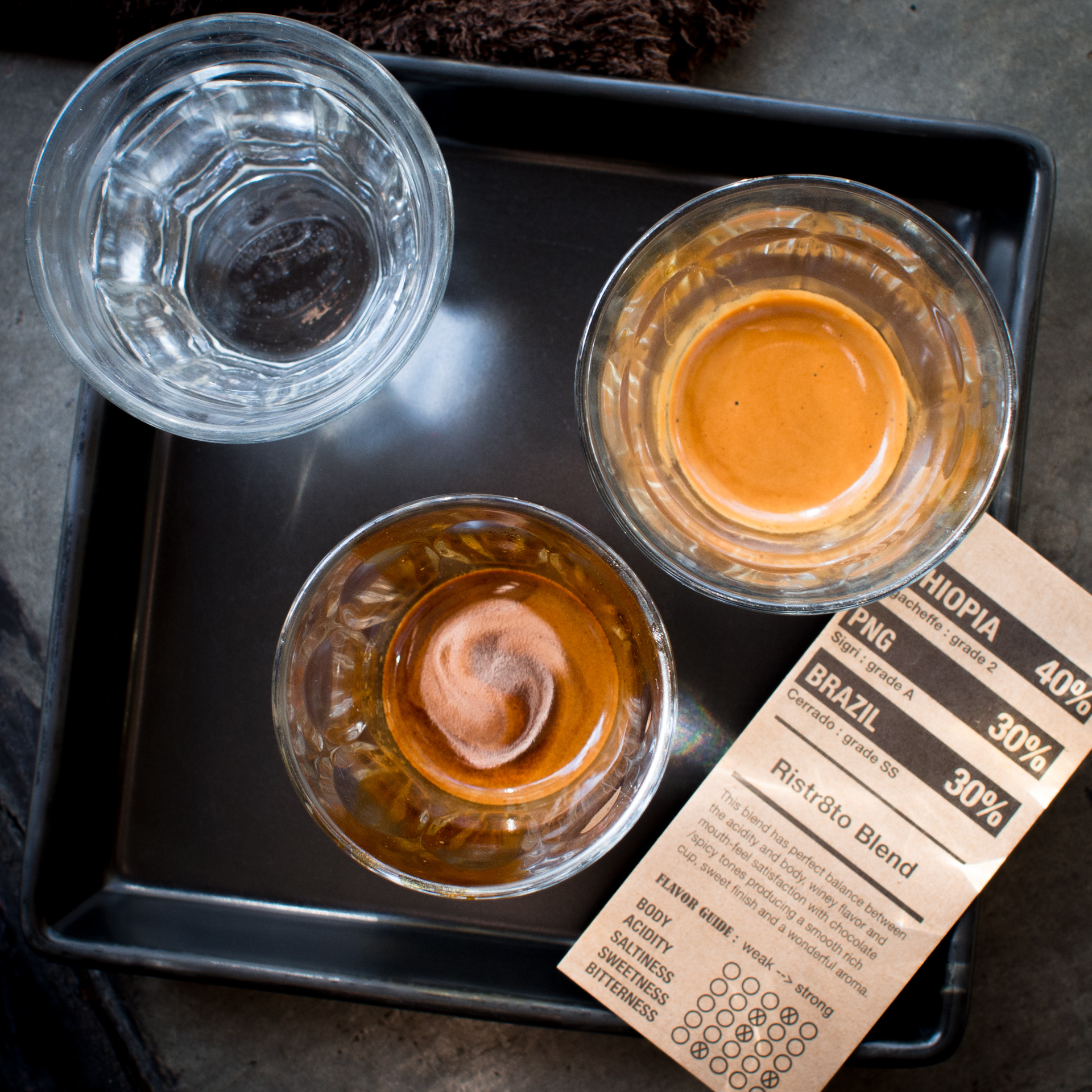
A double ristretto with the first half of the shot in the glass at the bottom of the image, and the second half in the glass on the right

Ristretto (Italian: [risˈtretto]), known in full in Italian as caffè ristretto, is a "short shot" of a highly concentrated espresso, 20 ml (0.7 imp fl oz; 0.7 US fl oz) from a double basket. It is made with the same amount of ground coffee, but extracted (also in from 20 to 30 seconds) using half as much water. A normal short shot might look like a ristretto, but in reality, would only be a weaker, more diluted, shot. The opposite of a ristretto (Italian for 'shortened, narrow') is a lungo ('long'), which has double the amount of water. In France a ristretto is called café serré.

Regardless of whether one uses a hand-pressed machine or an automatic, a regular double shot is generally considered to be around 14–18 g (0.49–0.63 oz) of ground coffee extracted into about 40 ml (2 fl oz; two shot glasses). Thus, a "double ristretto" consumes the same amount of coffee beans but fills only a single shot glass.

Coffee contains over a thousand aromatic compounds. A ristretto's chemical composition and taste differ from those of a full-length extraction for three reasons:

1. More concentrated: the first part of any extraction is the most concentrated, its color typically lying between dark chocolate and umber, whereas the tail end of shots are much lighter, varying from the color of dark pumpkin pie to varying shades of tan (see photo, above right). This is an important factor when drinking straight espresso shots.
2. Different balance: different chemical compounds in ground coffee dissolve into hot water at different rates. A ristretto contains a greater relative proportion of faster extracting compounds, proportionally fewer of the compounds characteristic of over-extraction, and thus, a different balance.
3. Fewer total extracts: relative proportions aside, fewer total coffee compounds—caffeine being just one—are extracted into ristrettos versus full length shots. This is an important factor when diluting shots into water or milk.

Straight ristrettos—shots that are traditionally drunk from a demitasse and not diluted into a larger cup containing milk or water—could be described as bolder, fuller, with more body and less bitterness. These characteristics are usually attributed to espresso in general but are more pronounced in a ristretto. Diluted into a cup of water (e.g., americano or long black) or milk (e.g., latte or cappuccino), ristrettos are less bitter and exhibit a more intense espresso character.

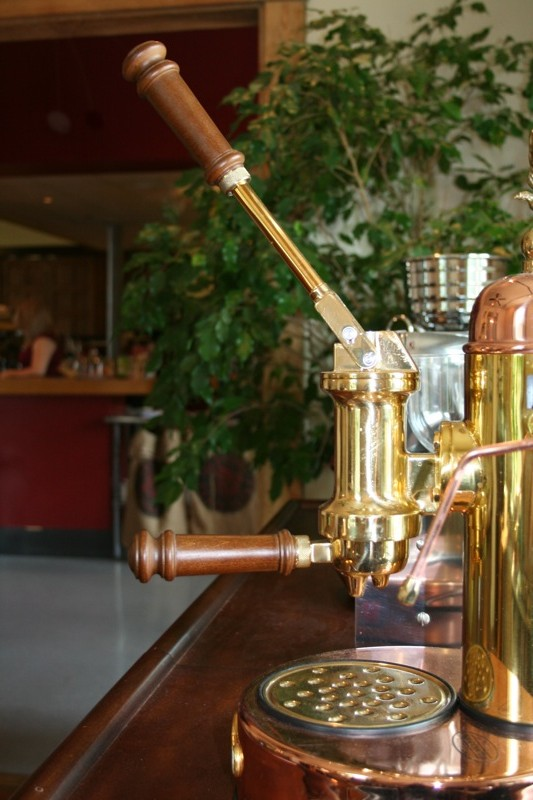
A manual espresso machine

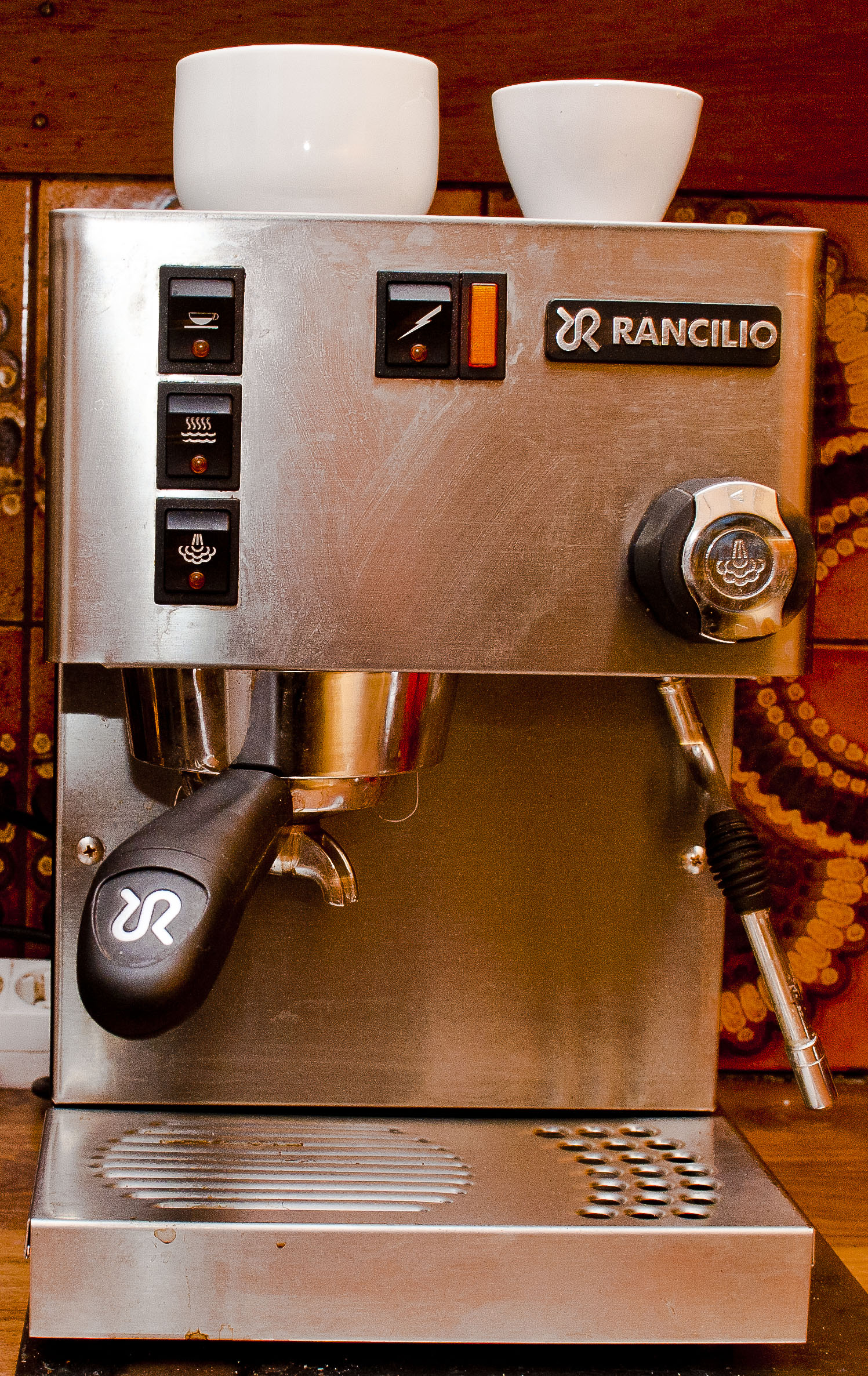
A semi-automatic (electrically pumped) espresso machine

== See also ==
- List of coffee drinks
