= List of politically motivated renamings =

This article lists times that items were renamed due to political motivations. Such renamings have generally occurred during conflicts: for example, World War I gave rise to anti-German sentiment among Allied nations, leading to disassociation with German names.

== Asia ==
- Israel: In response to United Nations General Assembly Resolution 3379, adopted in 1975, Israel renamed avenues called UN Avenue in Haifa, Jerusalem and Tel Aviv to Zionism Avenue.
- Iran: In 2006, during the Jyllands-Posten Muhammad cartoons controversy, the Iran Confectioners Union changed the name of the Danish pastry to Roses of the Prophet Muhammad.
- Philippines: On September 12, 2012, the Philippine President Benigno Aquino III signed Administrative Order No. 29 renaming parts of the South China Sea West Philippine Sea. The renamed portions of the sea are within the exclusive economic zone of the Philippines and contain the islands of Spratlys and Scarborough Shoal, which are disputed among five other countries.
- Turkey: Many placenames have been renamed.

== Oceania ==
- Australia: During World War I, many places and streets with German or 'German-sounding' titles were renamed. Jam-filled buns known as Berliners were renamed Kitchener buns, and a sausage product known as Fritz was renamed Devon (or luncheon meat).
- New Zealand: In 1998, while the French government was testing nuclear weapons in the Pacific, French loaves were renamed Kiwi loaves in a number of supermarkets and bakeries.

== Europe ==
- Cyprus: Greek-Cypriots began to market Turkish delight as Cyprus delight after the Turkish invasion of Cyprus.
- France:
  - French Revolution: The Committee of Public Safety went so far as to banish all words associated with royalty. A major example of their work was taking Kings and Queens out of playing cards and replacing them with Committee members. It lasted less than a year. It is commonly believed that this was also the time when Aces earned their status as being both the highest card and the lowest card. Furthermore, over a thousand towns and villages were renamed - an example is Lyon, which was renamed to Commune-Affranchie (Free Commune or Emancipated Commune).
  - World War I: Coffee with whipped cream, previously known as Café Viennois (Vienna coffee), was renamed Café Liégeois (Coffee from Liège) due to the state of war with Austria-Hungary. This appellation is still in use today, mainly for ice creams (chocolat liégeois and café liegeois).
- Greece: Ellinikos kafes 'Greek coffee' replaced Turkikos kafes 'Turkish coffee' on Greek menus in the 1960s and especially after the 1974 Cyprus crisis. Gyros replaced döner (ντονέρ). Many places have been renamed to avoid Turkish, Slavic, Albanian names.
- Russia:
  - During World War I, Saint Petersburg was renamed Petrograd, amounting effectively to a translation of the name from German to Russian.
  - At a meeting on November 16, 2016, with the prime ministers of Armenia, Belarus, Kazakhstan, and Kyrgyzstan, Russia's prime minister Dmitry Medvedev declared the name Americano to be "not politically correct" and suggested that Caffè Americano should be renamed Rusiano. While many considered the comments to be a joke, some restaurants, including Burger King locations in Russia changed the name on their menus. Also, in 2014, following Moscow's annexation of Crimea, several cafes on the peninsula changed their menus to read Russiano and Crimean, in place of Caffè Americano.
- Spain: After the triumph of Francisco Franco, filete imperial (imperial beef) became a euphemism for filete ruso (Russian beef), ensaladilla nacional (national salad) for ensaladilla rusa (Russian salad) and Caperucita Encarnada (Little Red Riding Hood) for Caperucita Roja (which has the same meaning but loses its hypothetical connotations).
- Ukraine: see Decommunization in Ukraine, Derussification in Ukraine, List of Ukrainian toponyms that were changed as part of decommunization in 2016 and List of streets renamed due to the 2022 Russian invasion of Ukraine
  - Russian invasion of Ukraine:
    - Some bars in Ukraine changed the name of the Moscow mule cocktail to Kyiv mule. The campaign spread to some bars in the United States to show solidarity with the Ukrainian people.
    - Several supermarkets in the English-speaking world changed the spelling of Chicken Kiev dish to the Ukrainian spelling Kyiv.
- United Kingdom:
  - World War I:
    - The German Shepherd was renamed the Alsatian and German biscuits were renamed Empire biscuits due to strong anti-German sentiment.
    - The members of the British royal house, a branch of the German House of Saxe-Coburg and Gotha, severed ties with their German cousins following several bombing raids on England by the first long-range bomber, the Gotha G.IV starting in March 1917. On July 17, 1917, King George V changed the family's name to the House of Windsor.

== North America ==
- Canada:
  - World War I: the Ontario city of Berlin was renamed Kitchener and the Saskatchewan town of Strassburg was renamed Strasbourg.
  - Cold War: the Ontario Stalin Township was renamed by Ontario legislature in 1986 to Hansen Township.
  - In 2025, due to the 2025 United States trade war with Canada and Mexico, in response to both president Donald Trump's threat of raising tariffs on Canadian imports into the United States and his expressed interest in annexing the country, some coffee shops in Canada changed the name of a popular drink from Americano to Canadiano.
- United States:
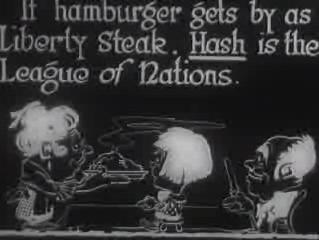
  A political cartoon lampooning the name change of hamburger meat during World War I
  - World War I:
    - The German Spitz was renamed the American Eskimo Dog.
    - Sauerkraut was marketed in the US as Liberty Cabbage.
    - Salisbury steak and Liberty Steaks were used as an alternative name for hamburgers.
    - In 1918, the town of Germania, Iowa, was renamed Lakota, Iowa.
    - In 1918, the town of New Berlin, Ohio, was renamed North Canton, Ohio.
    - In 1918, the town of German Valley, New Jersey was renamed Long Valley, New Jersey.
    - In 1918, the town of New Germantown, New Jersey was renamed Oldwick, New Jersey.
    - In 1919, the town of Berlin, Michigan was renamed Marne, Michigan.
    - In 1920, the town of Bismark, Pennsylvania was renamed Quentin, Pennsylvania.
  - Great Depression: In 1928, during the last months of the Calvin Coolidge administration, Congress approved the construction of a dam on the Colorado River southeast of Las Vegas, Nevada. The press referred to it as Boulder Dam as a reference to the construction site, Boulder Canyon. While in Nevada in 1930, Secretary of the Interior Ray Lyman Wilbur referred to the project as Hoover Dam, a reference to Republican President Herbert Hoover. Following Hoover's defeat by Democrat Franklin D. Roosevelt, Wilbur's successor, Harold L. Ickes, declared in 1933 that the dam should be called Boulder Dam. In 1947, the Republican-controlled Congress changed the name back to Hoover Dam.
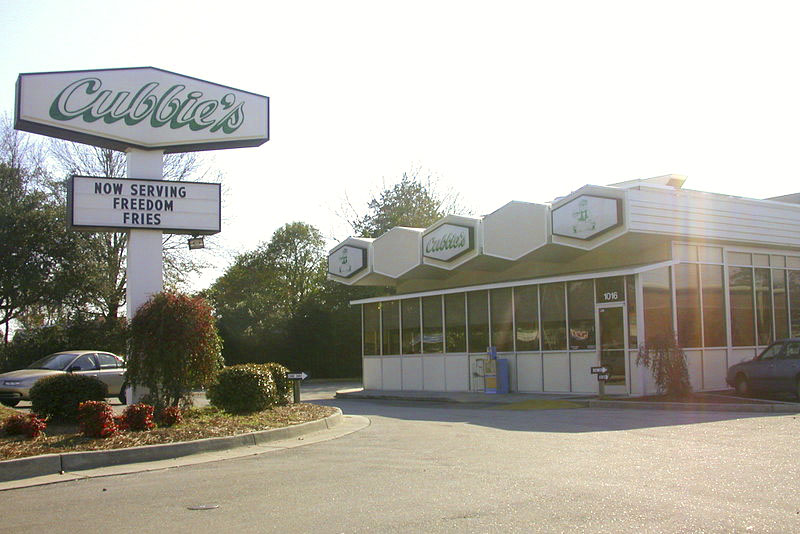
    Cubbie's in Wimington, North Carolina. "Now serving freedom fries" on the marquee.
  - War on terror: During the 2003 invasion of Iraq, there was an effort to rename French fries as freedom fries in the United States due to the French government's push to allow United Nations weapons inspectors more time, rather than sending troops to join the United States invasion of Iraq. There were simultaneous efforts to rebrand french toast as freedom toast, which included a name change at the house cafeteria at the United States Capitol building. The house cafeteria returned to using the name french fries in 2006.
  - List of name changes due to the George Floyd protests, mainly names considered to honor people with allegedly racist views, or which are racially offensive.
  - Executive Order 14172, changing the name of the Gulf of Mexico to the Gulf of America and changing the name of Denali back to Mount McKinley.
  - 2026 Presidential executive order Honoring The American History Of The Great Lakes And Renaming Lake Ontario As Lake America, changing the name of Lake Ontario to "Lake America".

== See also ==
- Geographical renaming
- Inclusive language
- Name changes due to the Islamic State
