= List of coffee drinks =

Beverages made from the seed of the Coffea plant

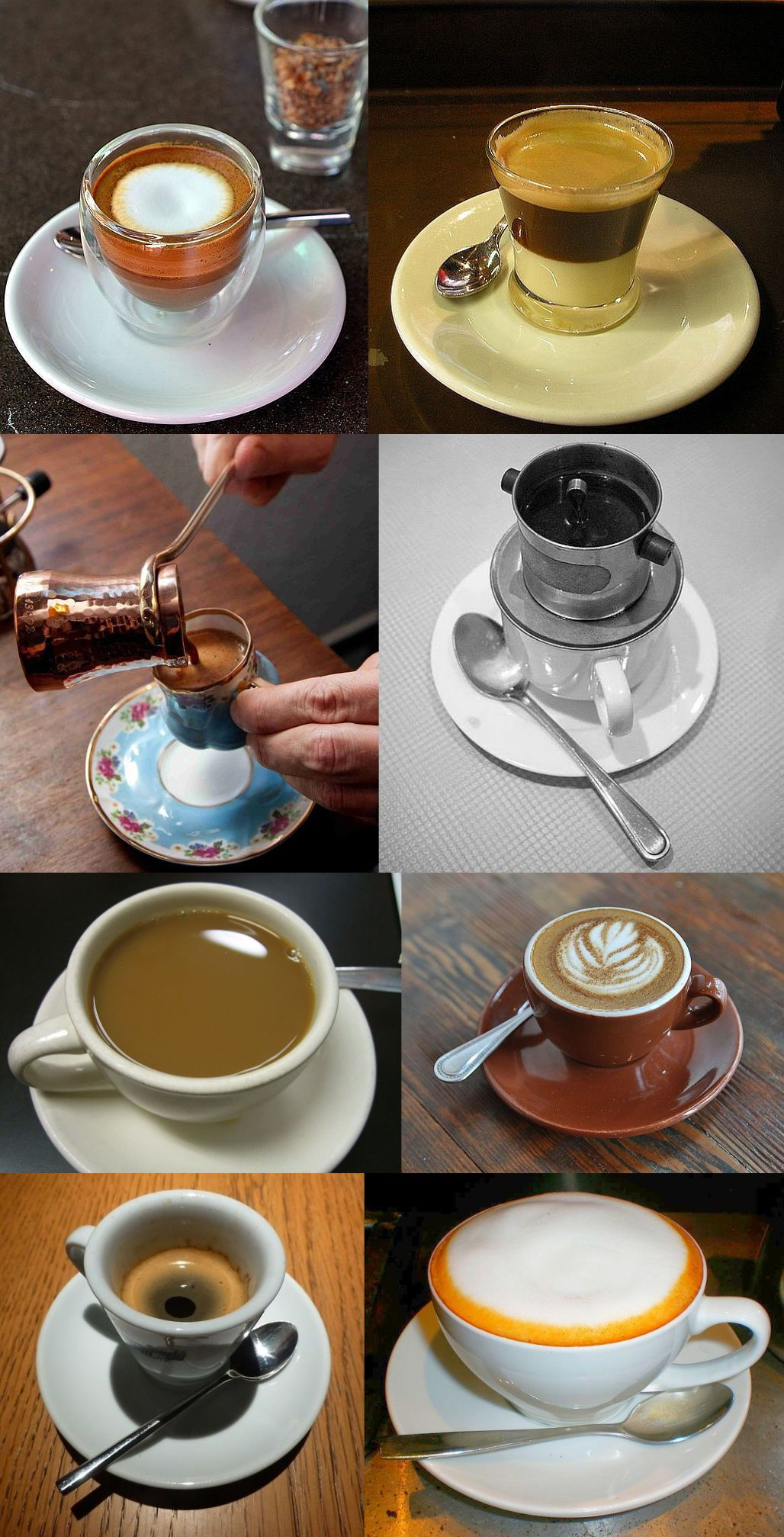

Coffee drinks are made by brewing water with ground coffee beans. The brewing is either done slowly, by drip, filter, French press, moka pot or percolator, or done very quickly, under pressure, by an espresso machine. When put under the pressure of an espresso machine, the coffee is termed espresso, while slow-brewed coffees are generally termed brewed coffee. While all coffee drinks are based on either coffee or espresso, some drinks add milk or cream, some are made with steamed milk or non-dairy milks, or add water (like the americano). Upon milk additions, coffee's flavor can vary with different syrups or sweeteners, alcoholic liqueurs, and even combinations of coffee with espresso or tea. There are many variations to the basic coffee or espresso bases.

With the invention of the Gaggia machine, espresso and espresso with milk, such as cappuccino and latte, spread in popularity from Italy and Greece in the 1950s. It then came to America, and with the rise in popularity of the Italian coffee culture in the 1980s, it began to spread worldwide via coffeehouses and coffeehouse chains.

The caffeine content in coffee beans may be reduced via one of several decaffeination processes to produce decaffeinated coffee, also known as decaf, which may be served as regular, espresso or instant coffee.

== Infused ==
=== Drip or filtered ===
Drip-brewed, or filtered coffee, is brewed by hot water passing slowly over roasted, ground coffee beans contained in a filter. Water seeps through the ground coffee, absorbing its oils, flavours and essences as it passes through the filter. The coffee grounds remain in the filter as the liquid slowly drips into a collecting vessel, such as a carafe or pot.

Paper coffee filters were invented in Germany by Melitta Bentz in 1908. To reduce waste, some coffee drinkers use fine wire mesh filters, which can be re-used for years. Many countries in Latin America and Africa, traditionally, prepare drip coffee using a small reusable bag made of cotton or other cloth.

=== French press or cafetière ===
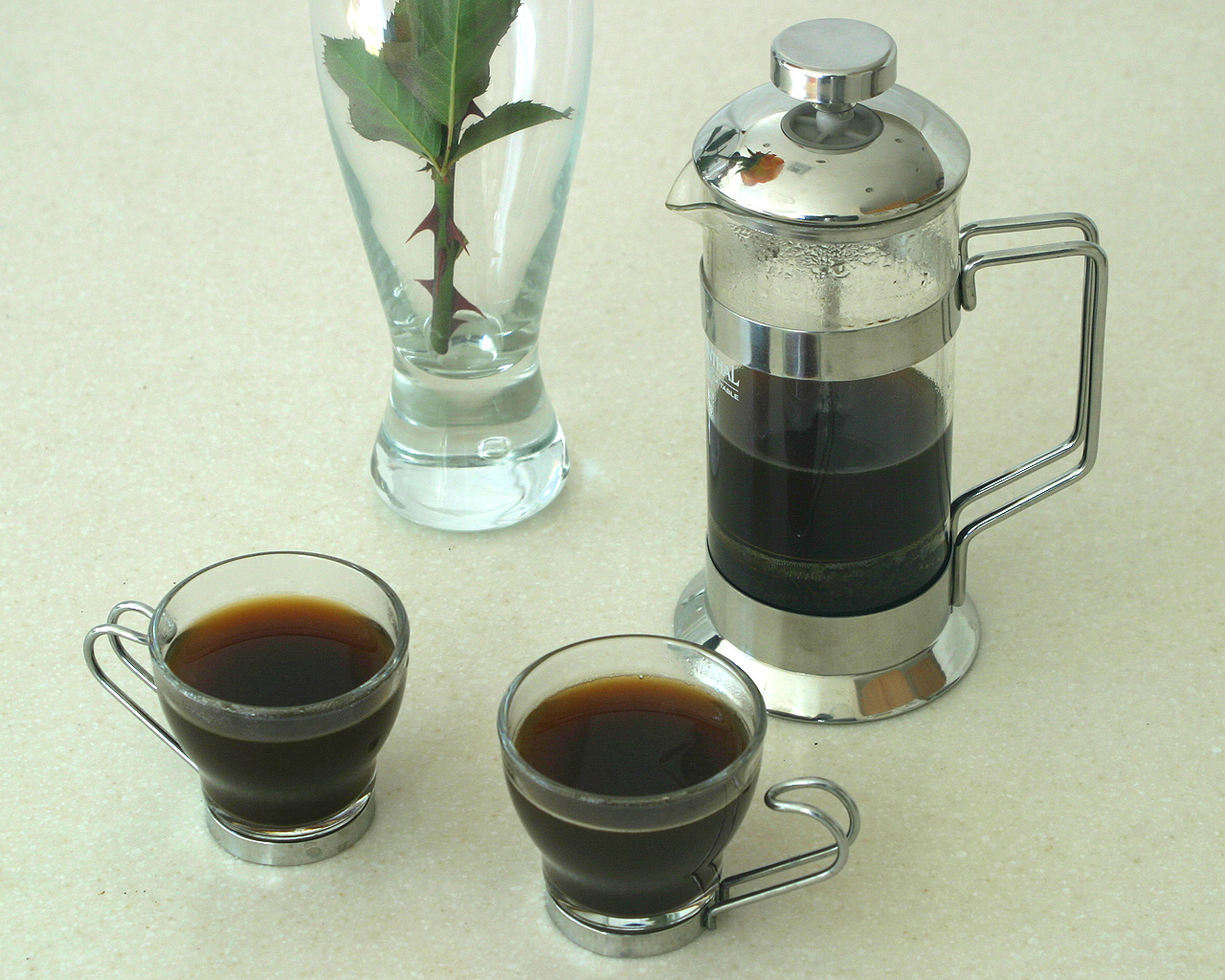
A French press set and coffee

A French press, also known as a press pot, coffee press, coffee plunger, cafetière (UK) or cafetière à piston, is a coffee brewing device patented by Italian designer Attilio Calimani in 1929. A French press requires a coarser grind of coffee than a drip brew coffee filter, as finer grounds will seep through the press filter and into the coffee.

Coffee in a French press is brewed by placing the ground coffee in the empty beaker and adding hot (93–96 °C, 200–205 °F) water, in proportions of about 28 grams (1 ounce) of coffee to 450 millilitres (15 US fluid ounces; 16 imperial fluid ounces) of water, more or less to taste. After approximately four minutes the plunger is pressed to separate the grounds and hold them at the bottom of the beaker, then the coffee is poured. Coffee press users have different preferences for how long to wait before pressing the plunger, with some enthusiasts preferring to wait longer than four minutes.

=== Cold brew ===
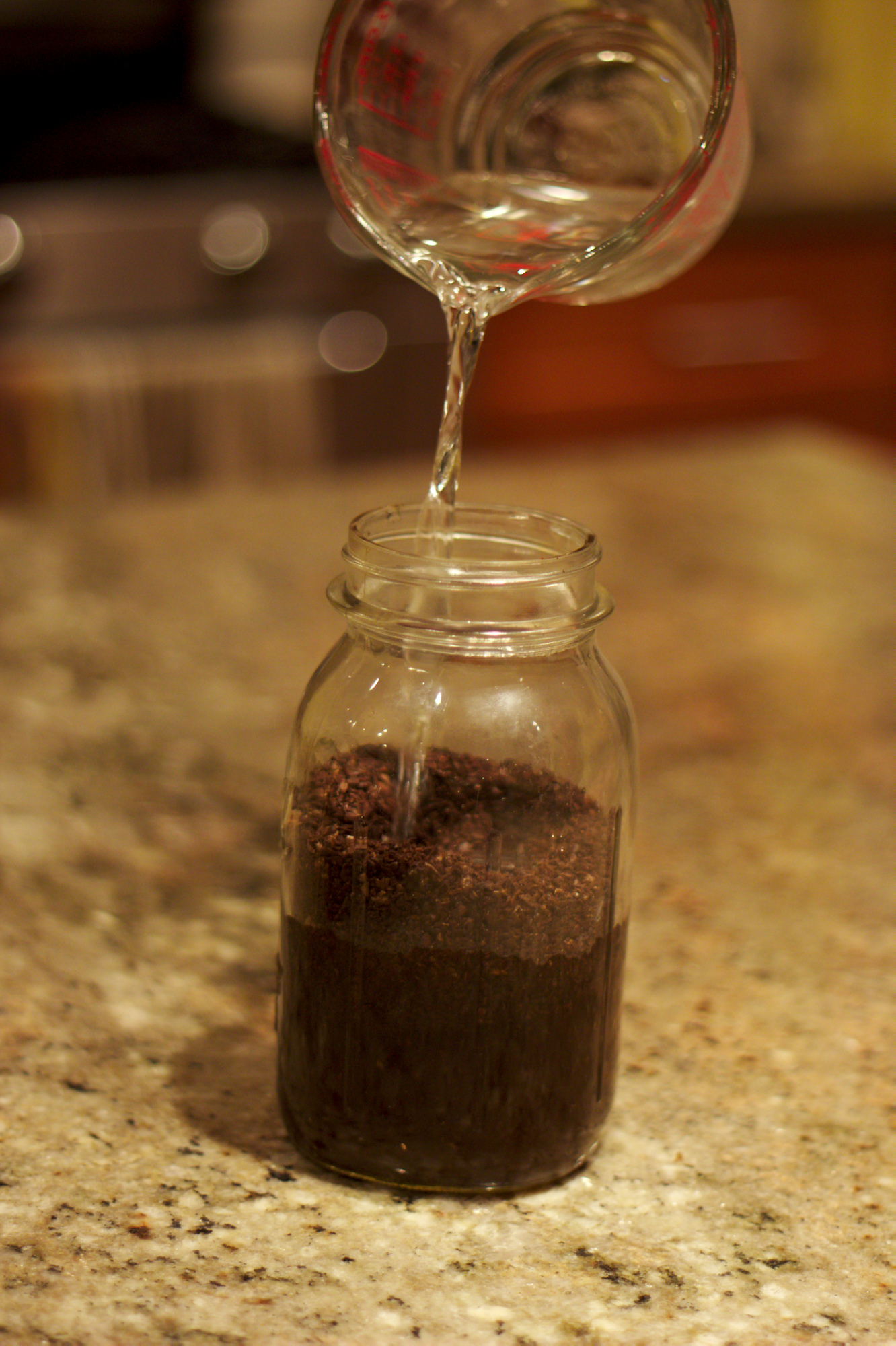
Preparation of coffee grounds for steeping of cold brew

Cold brew coffee, also called cold water extraction or cold pressing, is a type of coffee prepared by the process of steeping coffee grounds in water at cool temperatures for an extended period. Coarse-ground beans are soaked in water for 12 to 24 hours.

=== Flash brew ===
Flash brewing is another Japanese style of cold coffee brewing. It is similar to drip coffee, as it involves pouring hot water over ground coffee contained in a filter. In this method, a smaller amount of hot water is used and the coffee is dripped directly over ice which immediately cools the coffee down. Unlike cold brewing – another cold coffee method – flash brewed coffee preserves the flavor and acidity that is characteristic of hot drip coffee. Because of this, flash brew coffee is well suited for lighter roasts of coffee, chosen for their unique and complex flavors. In many coffee shops and coffee chains, iced coffee is made by taking hot coffee and adding ice, which waters down the coffee over time. Flash brewing works around this issue.

== Boiled ==
=== Turkish ===
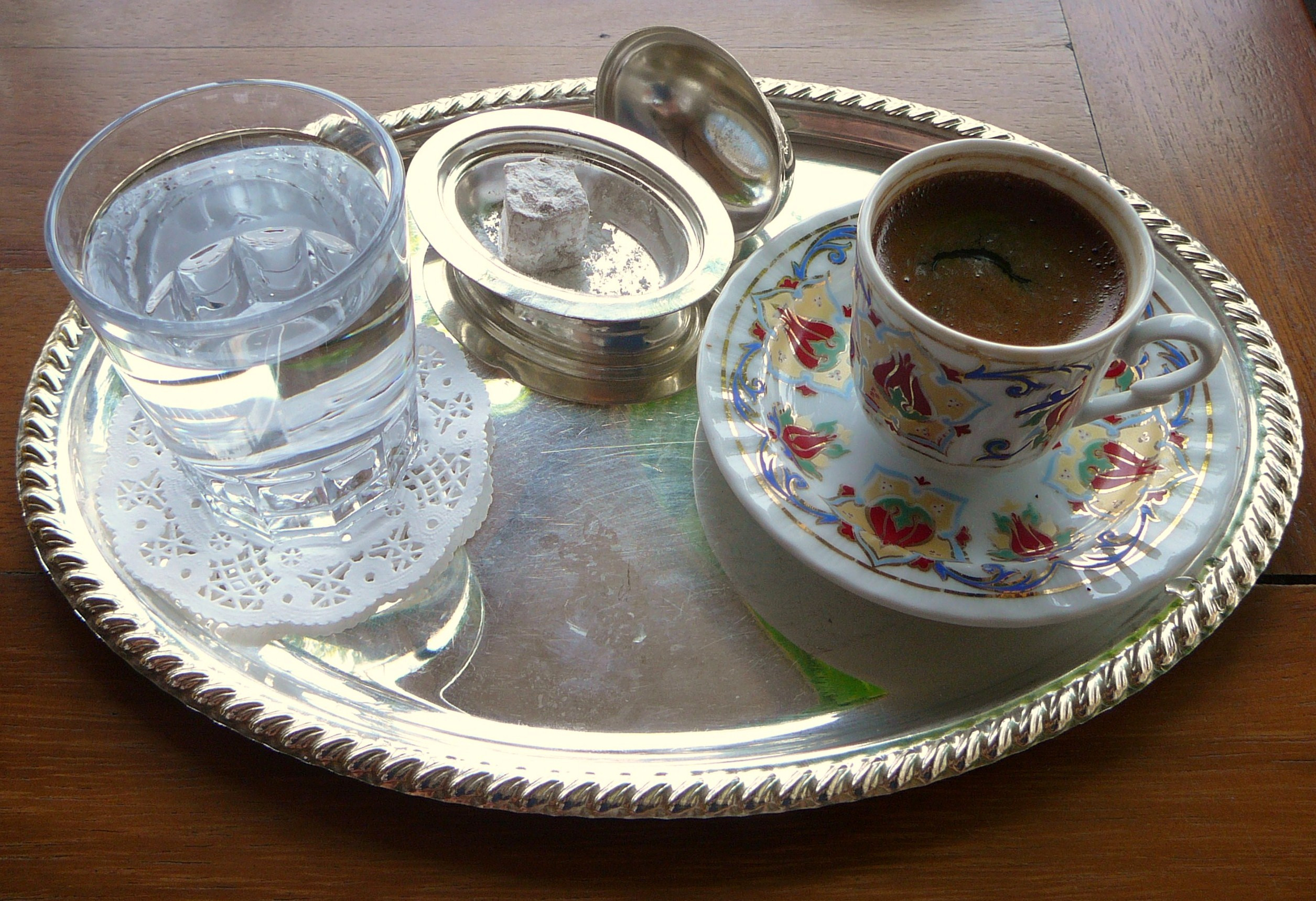
Traditional serving with a glass of water and lokum

Beans for Turkish coffee are ground to a fine powder. Turkish coffee is prepared by immersing the coffee grounds in water and heating until it just boils. This method produces the maximum amount of foam. If the coffee is left to boil longer, less foam remains. In Turkey, four degrees of sweetness are used. The Turkish terms and approximate amounts are as follows: sade (plain; no sugar), az şekerli (little sugar; half a level teaspoon of sugar), orta şekerli (medium sugar; one level teaspoon), şekerli or çok şekerli (high sugar; two or three teaspoons). Before boiling, the coffee and the desired amount of sugar are stirred until all the coffee sinks and the sugar is dissolved. If the coffee is stirred for longer (up to the boiling point), little or no foam remains. The Turkish term for this kind of coffee is köpüksüz (no foam).

Turkish coffee has been designated an Intangible Cultural Heritage of Turkey by UNESCO.

=== Arabic ===
Arabic coffee is made by boiling finely powdered Arabica coffee beans—often with spices such as cardamom, cloves, saffron, or cinnamon—in water (and occasionally briefly simmered), typically using a traditional pot like a dallah or cezve. Unlike Turkish coffee, sugar is usually not added, and it is served unfiltered in small handle-less cups called finjān. Arabic coffee is a deeply rooted cultural tradition across the Arabian Peninsula and the Levant, symbolizing hospitality and generosity, and has been inscribed as Intangible Cultural Heritage by UNESCO.

=== Kopi kothok ===
Kopi kothok is made by boiling coffee grounds and sugar together in a pot or a saucepan. It is very common in Cepu and Bojonegoro, Indonesia. The ratio of coffee grounds and sugar is generally one to two. A 1:1 ratio for more bitter coffee drinks. Milk also can be added according to the order before boiling the coffee grounds.

=== Yazdi coffee ===
Yazdi coffee, also known as Rozeh coffee, is a traditional drink served to mourners in Yazd during Muharram, dating back to at least the Qajar era. It belongs to the Middle Eastern coffee family and was nationally registered as an intangible cultural heritage of Iran in July 2019. Serving coffee at mourning ceremonies was influenced by Zoroastrian traditions and became an Islamic ritual in Yazd. The earliest written record dates to 1832.

Brewing Yazdi coffee involves roasting coffee, boiling it for hours, and adding rosewater, cardamom, and sugar. It is strained through silk cloth and served in small cups, sometimes with Yazdi cake. Yazdi coffee was registered as Iran’s intangible cultural heritage on July 4, 2019, under registration number 1893.

=== Café tropeiro ===
Café tropeiro is typical from the Brazilian tropeiro cuisine, popularized by tropeiros during the 17th and 18th centuries. It is prepared by boiling coffee powder with water and later decanting the powder with embers.

== Vacuum coffee ==
A vacuum coffee maker brews coffee using two chambers where vapor pressure and vacuum produce coffee. This type of coffee maker is also known as vac pot, siphon or syphon coffee maker, and was invented by Loeff of Berlin in the 1830s. These devices have since been used for more than a century in many parts of the world and more recently have been given a new use by bartenders and chefs to make hot cocktails and broths.

== Espresso ==
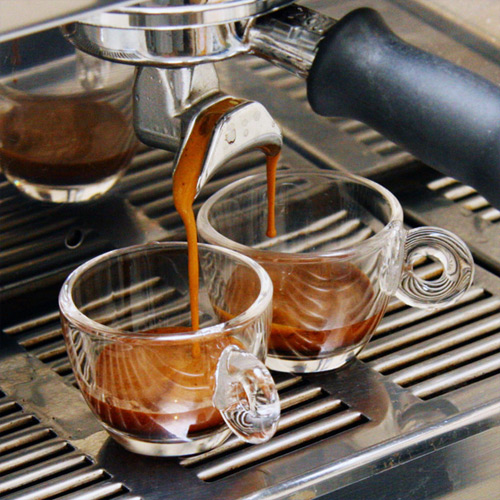
Espresso

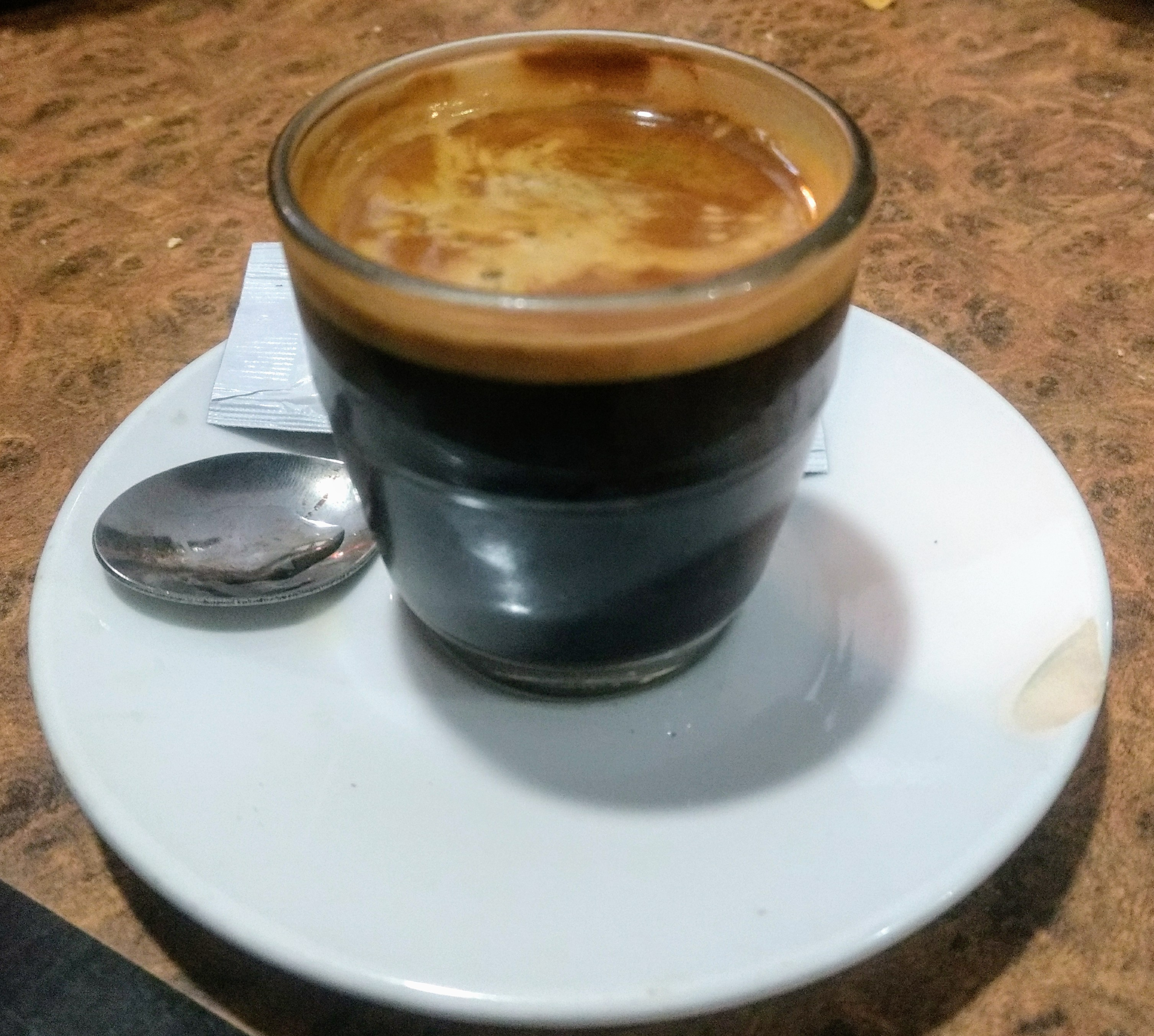
Caffè lungo

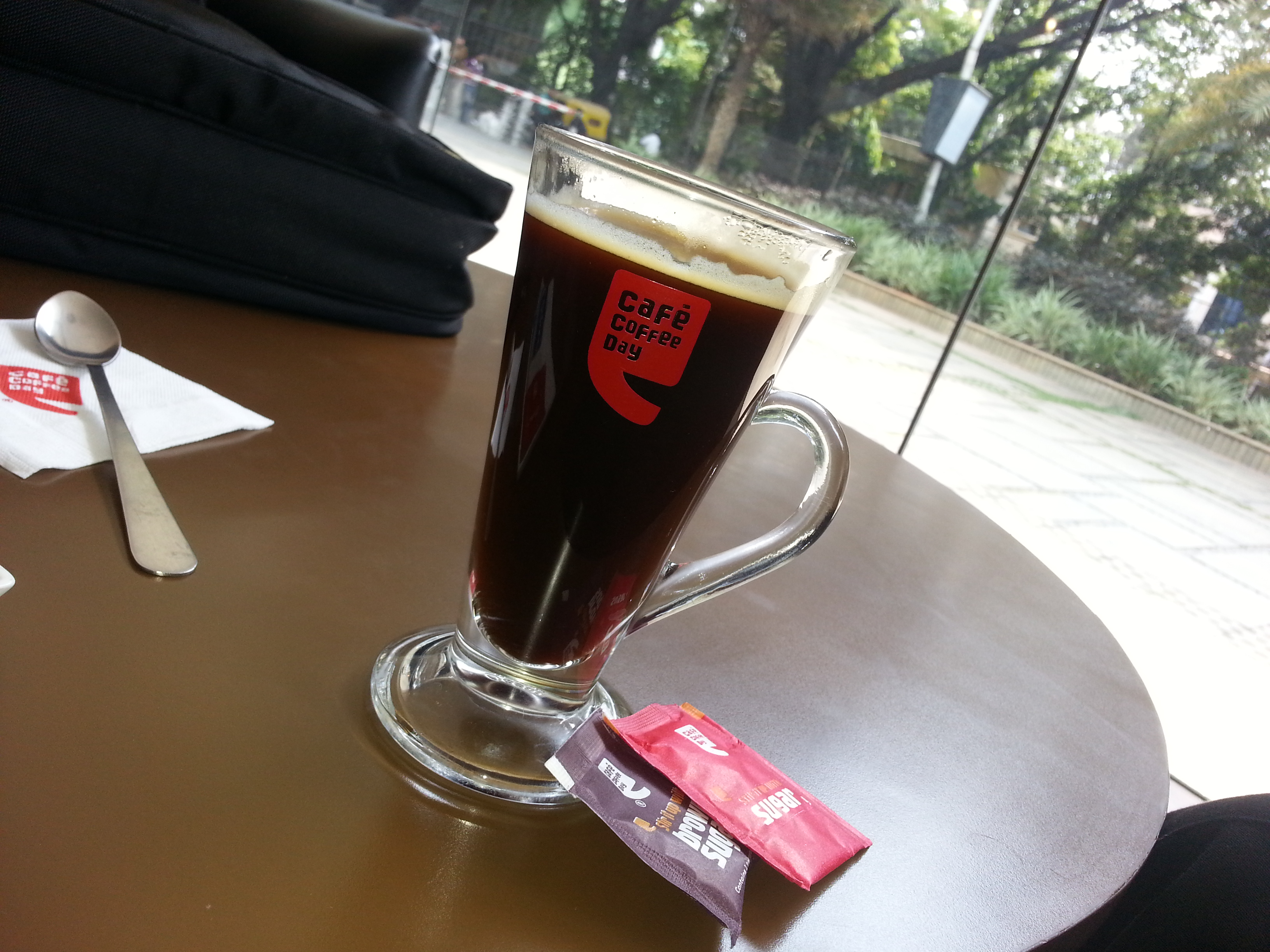
Caffè americano

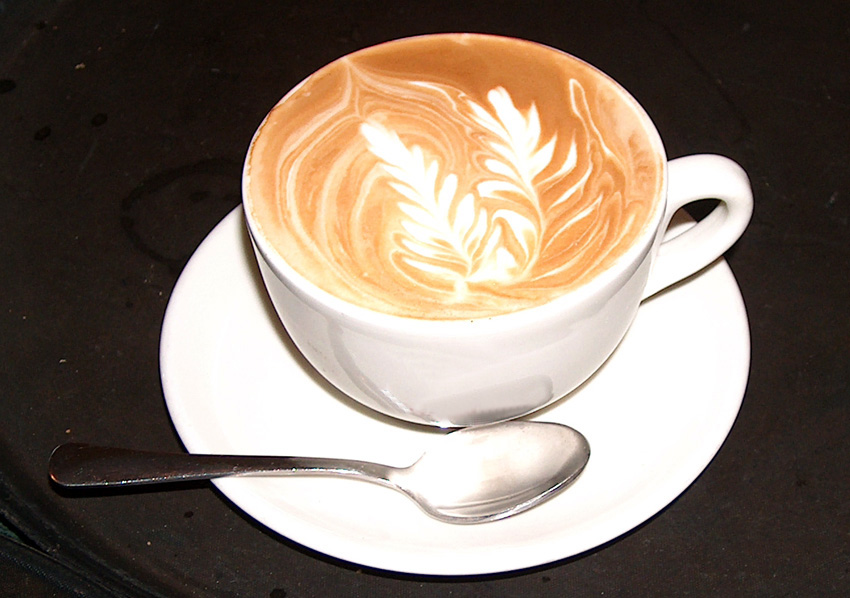
Cappuccino

Espresso is brewed by machine, forcing a small amount of nearly boiling water and steam – about 86 to 95 °C (187 to 203 °F) – under pressure through finely ground and compacted coffee. The espresso machine was patented in 1901 from an earlier 1884 machine, and developed in Italy; with the invention of the Gaggia machine, espresso spread in popularity to the UK in the 1950s where it was more often drunk with milk as cappuccino due to the influence of the British milk bars, then America in the 1980s where again it was mainly drunk with milk, and then via coffeehouse chains it spread worldwide. Espresso is generally denser than coffee brewed by other methods, having a higher concentration of suspended and dissolved solids; it generally has a creamy foam on top known as crema. Espresso is the base for a number of other coffee drinks, such as latte, cappuccino, macchiato, mocha, and americano. The term espresso, substituting s for most x letters in Latin-root words, with the term deriving from the past participle of the Italian verb esprimere, itself derived from the Latin exprimere, means 'to express', and refers to the process by which hot water is forced under pressure through ground coffee.

Doppio
Doppio is a double shot, served in a demitasse cup.
Caffè lungo
A lungo (or allongé in French) is similar to a caffè americano or a long black. However, instead of adding water to an espresso, all the water is brewed. The lungo is generally smaller than an americano or a long black.
Caffè americano
An americano is prepared by adding hot water to espresso, giving a similar strength to but different flavor from brewed coffee. The drink consists of a single or double-shot of espresso combined with between 150 and 400 ml (5 and 14 US fluid ounces; 5 and 14 imperial fluid ounces) of hot water. The strength of an americano varies with the number of shots of espresso added. In the United States, americano is used broadly to mean combining hot water and espresso in either order. Variations include long black and lungo.
Cappuccino
Latte
Cortado

Cortado is a Spanish beverage made by pouring a small amount of espresso into a small glass cup, then cutting it with an equal amount of steamed milk in order to neutralize the bitterness. The name comes from the Spanish word cortar, meaning to cut, which refers to the preparation process.

This ratio of espresso to milk gives a unique flavor in which the robustness of the coffee comes through, while the finish is velvety due to the steamed milk. Cortado is typically consumed in coffee bars, as it is not intended to be taken on the go.

Flat white

A flat white is an espresso with microfoam (steamed milk with small, fine bubbles and a glossy or velvety consistency). It is comparable to a latte, but smaller in volume and with less microfoam, therefore having a higher ratio of coffee to milk, and milk that is more velvety in consistency – allowing the espresso to dominate the flavour, while being supported by the milk.

Flat red

A flat red is a coffee drink consisting of espresso and steamed orange and pomegranate juice. The hot beverage combines the intensity of coffee with the refreshing acidity of citrus and pomegranate notes, producing a balanced flavor profile and a distinctive aroma. It contains no added sugar and no milk. The flat red was created in 2016 by Ukrainian barista Vadym Granovskiy in Kyiv.

Café cubano

Cuban tradition is to drink coffee strong and sweet, often mixing the sugar with the coffee beans before brewing. The traditional method of brewing coffee was a filter method using a cloth cone; this has mostly been replaced with an aluminium cafetera or coffeemaker—in tourist areas some cafés will have an espresso machine, though espresso machines are expensive, so espresso is not a common drink for most Cubans. Though quality coffee is grown in Cuba, it is expensive, so most Cubans drink coffee imported from Puerto Rico, and often mixed with ground peas. The Cuban habit of brewing coffee with sugar has spread to Miami, West Palm Beach, Tampa and the Keys, in Florida, where espresso is the preferred brewing method and an espresso brewed with sugar is termed café cubano, Cuban coffee, Cuban espresso, cafecito, Cuban pull, or Cuban shot. Sometimes demerara sugar is used, and sometimes the sugar (white or brown) is not brewed with the coffee, but is placed in the cup as the coffee is dripped into it, then stirred into a froth. Variations on the Miami café cubano are with a splash of milk – cortadito; and with steamed milk – café con leche.

Caffè crema

Caffè crema (Italian for 'cream coffee') refers to two different coffee drinks: an old name for espresso (the 1940s and 1950s), and a long espresso drink primarily served in Germany, Switzerland and Austria and northern Italy (the 1980s onwards), along the Italian/ Swiss and Italian/ Austrian border. As a term, it generally means "espresso", while in technical discussions, referring to the long drink, it may more narrowly be referred to as Swiss caffè crema. Variant terms include "crema caffè" and the hyperforeignism "café crema" – "café" is French, while "caffè" and "crema" are Italian, thus "café crema" mixes French and Italian.

Cafe Zorro
A cafe Zorro is a double espresso or doppio, added to hot water with a 1:1 ratio.
Ristretto

Straight ristrettos—shots that are traditionally drunk from a demitasse and not diluted into a larger cup containing milk or water—could be described as bolder, fuller, with more body, and less bitterness, but with a higher concentration of acidity. These characteristics are usually attributed to espresso in general but are more pronounced in a ristretto. Diluted into a cup of water (to make an americano or long black) or milk (e.g. latte and cappuccino), ristrettos are less bitter and exhibit a more intense espresso character.

Melbourne Magic

Originally two shots of hot ristretto three-quarter flat white.

== Moka ==
The moka pot is a stove-top or electric coffee maker that brews coffee by passing hot water driven by vapor pressure and heat-driven gas expansion through ground coffee. Named after the Yemeni city of Mokha, it was popularized by Italian aluminum vendor Alfonso Bialetti and his son Renato starting from 1933. It quickly became one of the staples of Italian culture. Bialetti Industries continues to produce the original model under the trade name "Moka Express".

Spreading from Italy, the moka pot is today most commonly used in Europe, Latin America, and Australia. It has become an iconic design, displayed in modern industrial art and design museums including the Wolfsonian-FIU, the Cooper–Hewitt, National Design Museum, the Design Museum, the London Science Museum, The Smithsonian and the Museum of Modern Art. Moka pots come in different sizes, making from one to eighteen 50 ml (2 imp fl oz; 2 US fl oz) servings.

The original design and many current models are made from aluminium with Bakelite handles, though they are sometimes made out of stainless steel or other alloys. Some designs feature an upper half made of heat-resistant glass.

== Combinations ==
=== Coffee with milk ===
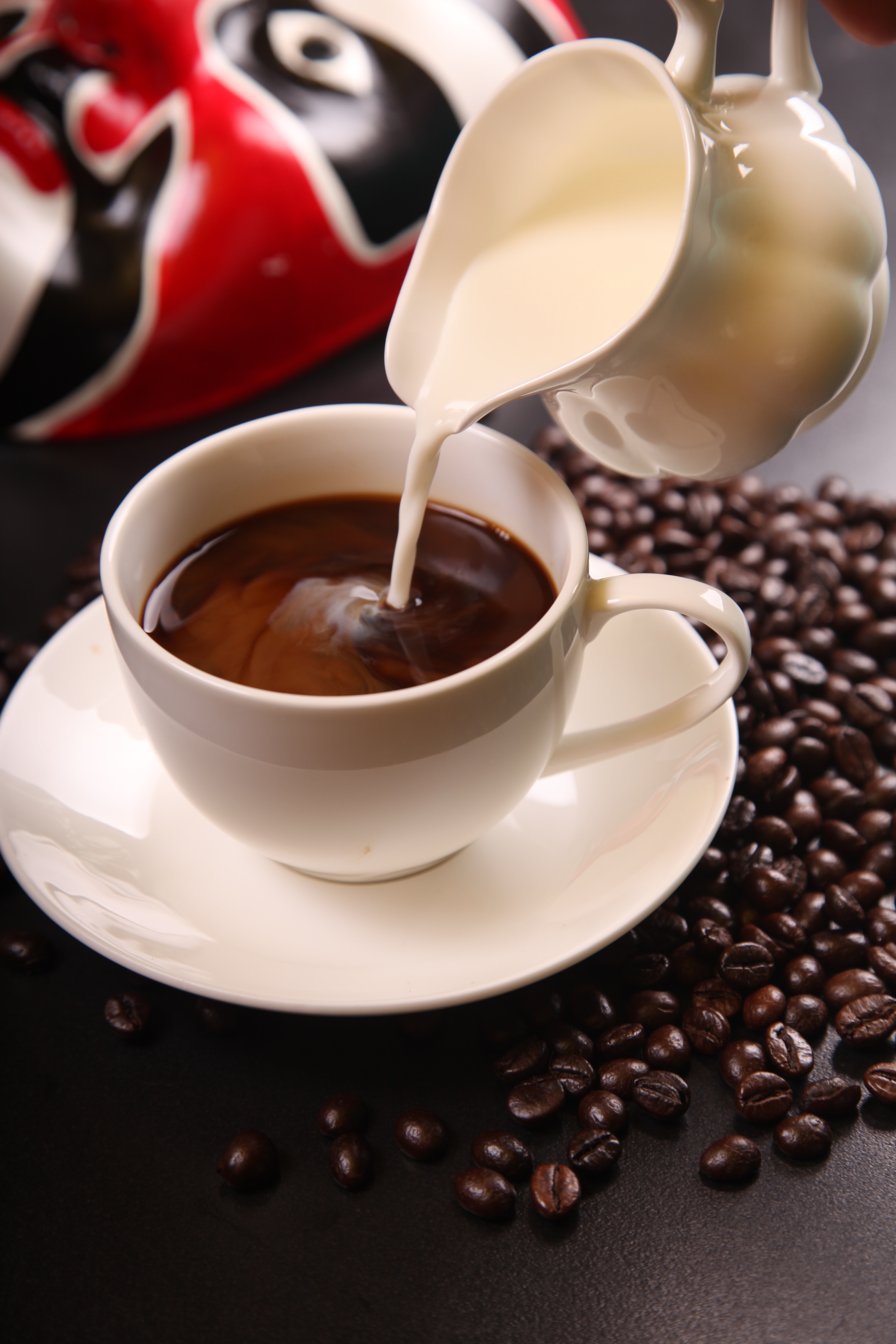
Coffee with milk

Milk coffee is a category of coffee-based drinks made with milk. Johan Nieuhof, the Dutch ambassador to China, is credited as the first person to drink coffee with milk when he experimented with it around 1660.

=== Coffee with coconut milk ===
There is a coffee drink combined with coconut milk from Blora, Indonesia. It is called kopi santen (Javanese) or kopi santan (Indonesian). Formulated for the first time in 1980 by a grandmother named Sakijah.

=== Slow-brewed and espresso ===
Regular coffee (slow brewed as with a filter or cafetière) is sometimes combined with espresso to increase either the intensity of the flavour or the caffeine content. This may be called a variety of names, most commonly red eye, or shot in the dark. Coffeehouse chains may have their own names, such as turbo at Dunkin' Donuts. and depth charge – a federally registered trademark of Caribou Coffee. At Starbucks, a double shot of espresso in the coffee may be termed a "black eye", and a triple shot a "dead eye". "Caffè Tobio" is a version with an equal amount of coffee to espresso.

=== Liqueur coffee ===
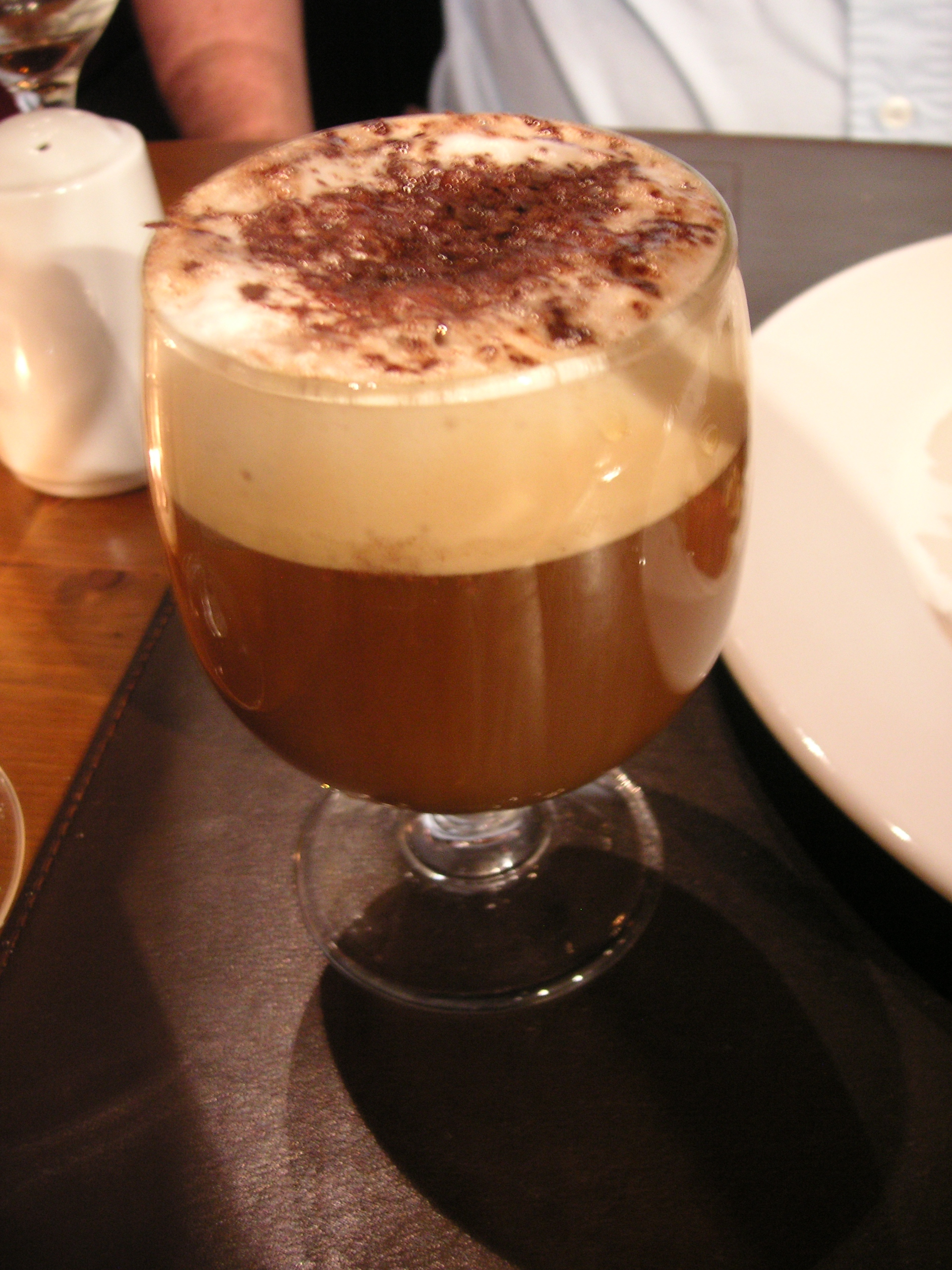
Bailey's Irish Cream and coffee

The caffeine content of these drinks, to the extent that caffeine is present in them, will not prevent intoxication from their alcohol content. Instead, the caffeine may mask the true degree of alcohol-induced loss of coordination.

- Barraquito is an old drink from Tenerife combining espresso, condensed sweetened milk, foamed milk, lemon, cinnamon and Licor 43, which was carried across the Atlantic in a later modified form as the Carajillo.
- Café Calva is a drink from the Normandy region of France, consisting of coffee with Calvados (apple brandy). The Calvados may be added to the coffee, used to soak a sugar cube before adding it to the coffee (known as "Le canard," the duck) or used as a "rinse," added to the cup after drinking the coffee.
- Caffè corretto (that is an Italian drink, consists of a shot of espresso "corrected" with a shot of liquor, usually grappa, brandy or sambuca.)
- Ponce, a hot drink, akin to tea grog (the name itself is a calque of punch) originating in Leghorn port: a shot of espresso poured on top of rum made hot with the espresso machine steamer. A lemon zest is often added.
- A carajillo is a Spanish drink combining coffee with brandy, whisky, anisette, or rum. It is typical of Spain and, according to folk etymology, its origin dates to the Spanish occupation of Cuba. The troops combined coffee with rum to give them courage (coraje in Spanish, hence "corajillo" and more recently "carajillo"). There are many different ways of making a carajillo, ranging from black coffee with the spirit simply poured in to heating the spirit with lemon, sugar and cinnamon and adding the coffee last. A similar Italian drink is known as caffè corretto. The American version of a Spanish Coffee uses a heated sugar-rimmed Spanish coffee mug with 3/4 US fluid ounce (22 ml; 0.78 imp fl oz) of rum and 1/2 US fluid ounce (15 ml; 0.52 imp fl oz) of triple sec. The drink is then flamed to caramelize the sugar, with 2 US fluid ounces (59 ml; 2.1 imp fl oz) of coffee liqueur then added to put out the flame, and then topped off with 3 to 4 US fluid ounces (89 to 118 ml; 3.1 to 4.2 imp fl oz) of coffee, and whipped cream.
- Hasseltse koffie, Vlaamse koffie or Afzakkertje (coffee with Hasseltse jenever).
- Hotshot is a Swedish shot with 1 part Galliano, 1 part coffee and 1 part heavy cream.
- Irish coffee
- Karsk, kaffegök or svartkopp (coffee with moonshine)
- Rüdesheimer Kaffee is an alcoholic coffee drink from Rüdesheim in Germany invented in 1957 by Hans Karl Adam. It is made with Asbach Uralt brandy with coffee and sugar, and is topped with whipped cream.
- A Pharisäer (Danish: farisæer), meaning a Pharisee, is an alcoholic coffee drink that is popular in the Nordfriesland district of Germany. It consists of a mug of black coffee, a double shot of rum, and a topping of whipped cream. In 1981, a court in Flensburg ruled that 2 cl (0.70 imperial fluid ounces; 0.68 US fluid ounces) of rum were not sufficient for preparing a genuine Pharisäer.
- A gunfire has its origins in the British Army, typically made by mixing black tea with rum, though in Australia and New Zealand it is more often made with black coffee instead. On ANZAC Day, this version is served to soldiers before dawn services as part of the "gunfire breakfast".

== Flavoured ==
Some coffeehouses provide flavoured syrups which customers can have added to their coffee drinks. Some non-dairy creamers have flavoured versions, such as hazelnut flavour and Irish Cream flavour (the latter is non-alcoholic). Other flavored coffees are named, and offered at coffee houses either globally or regionally.

Cafe con Miel

A cafe con miel or café miel has a shot of espresso, steamed milk, cinnamon, and honey. The name comes from the Spanish word for honey, miel.

Café de olla

Café de olla or pot coffee is a traditional coffee-based drink prepared using earthen clay pots or jars in Mexico and other Latin American countries. It is flavored with cinnamon and piloncillo. Consumed primarily in colder weathers, usually with the merienda meal, and accompanied by pan dulce pastries.

Espressino or Marocchino

The marocchino is made from espresso, steamed milk, and a dusting of cocoa powder, similar to the espressino.

Mocha or café mocha or mochaccino or rápido y sucio

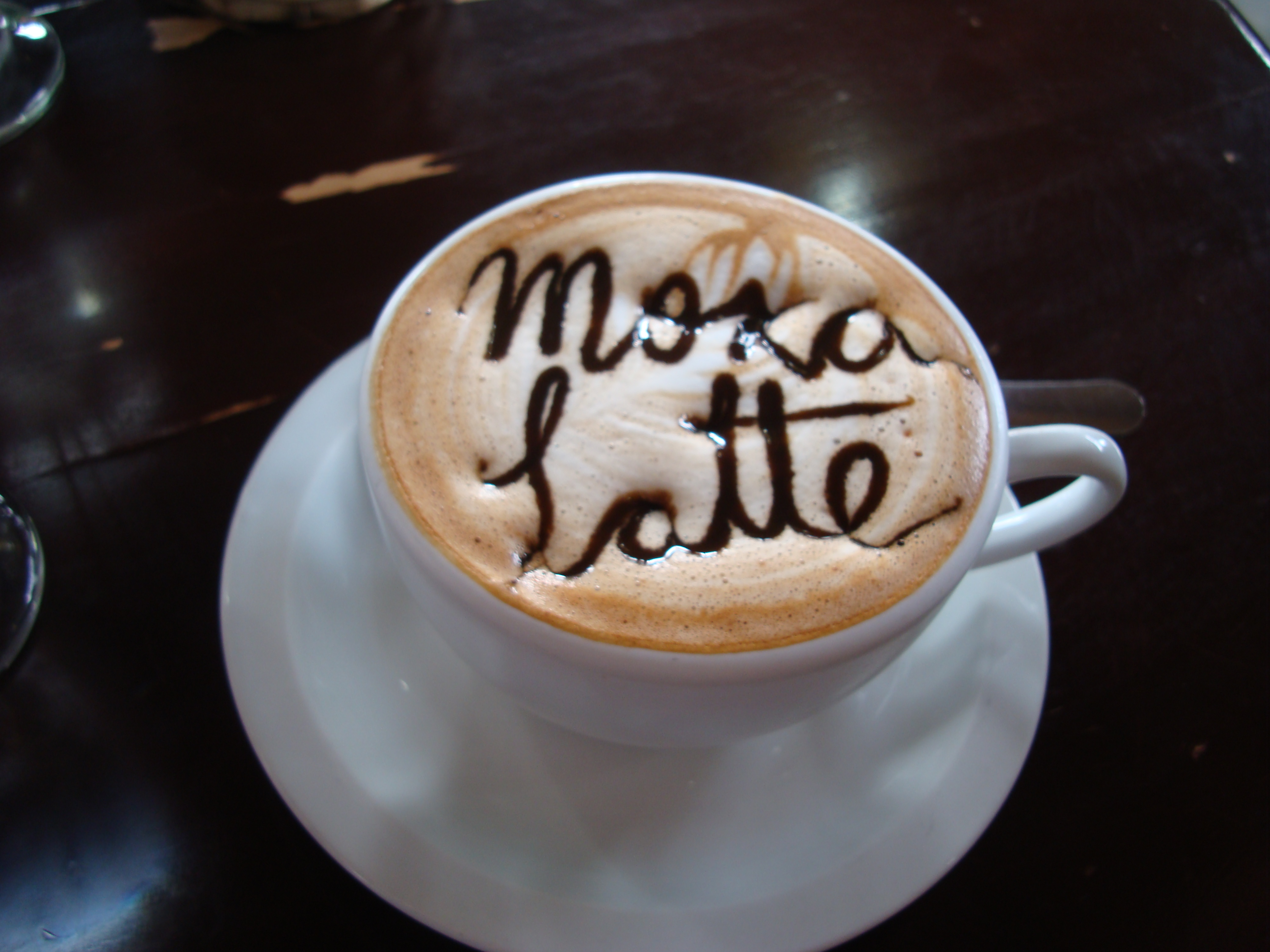
A mocha latte in Costa Rica

A café mocha is a variant of a caffè latte. Like a latte, it is typically one third espresso and two thirds steamed milk, but a portion of chocolate is added, typically in the form of a chocolate syrup, although other vending systems use instant chocolate powder. Mochas can contain dark or milk chocolate.

The term moccaccino is used in some regions of Europe and the Middle East to describe caffè latte with cocoa or chocolate. In the U.S. it usually refers to a cappuccino made with chocolate.

A cafe borgia is a mocha with orange rind and sometimes orange flavoring added. Often served with whipped cream and topped with cinnamon.

A café rápido y sucio, or a quick & dirty coffee, is three shots of espresso topped with chocolate or mocha syrup. Unlike a café mocha which has milk added or an Americano which has water added, a Café Rápido y Sucio or a Quick & Dirty Coffee is espresso and chocolate only. Any variation of this drink containing more than three shots of espresso would be referred to as a Fast & Filthy Coffee.

Melya

Melya is coffee flavoured with cocoa powder and honey. Cream is sometimes added.

Pedrocchi or Paduan Coffee

A mint coffee that originated from the city of Padua in the Caffè Pedrocchi. It is indeed known in Padua as Pedrocchi; while in the rest of Italy as Caffè Padovano, which can be translated as Paduan Coffee. It is made of a lower layer of hot espresso coffee, a middle thick layer of fresh cream and mint syrup, and an upper thin layer of cocoa powder. The beverage is not to be stirred nor added with sugar.

== Iced ==
=== Frappé ===
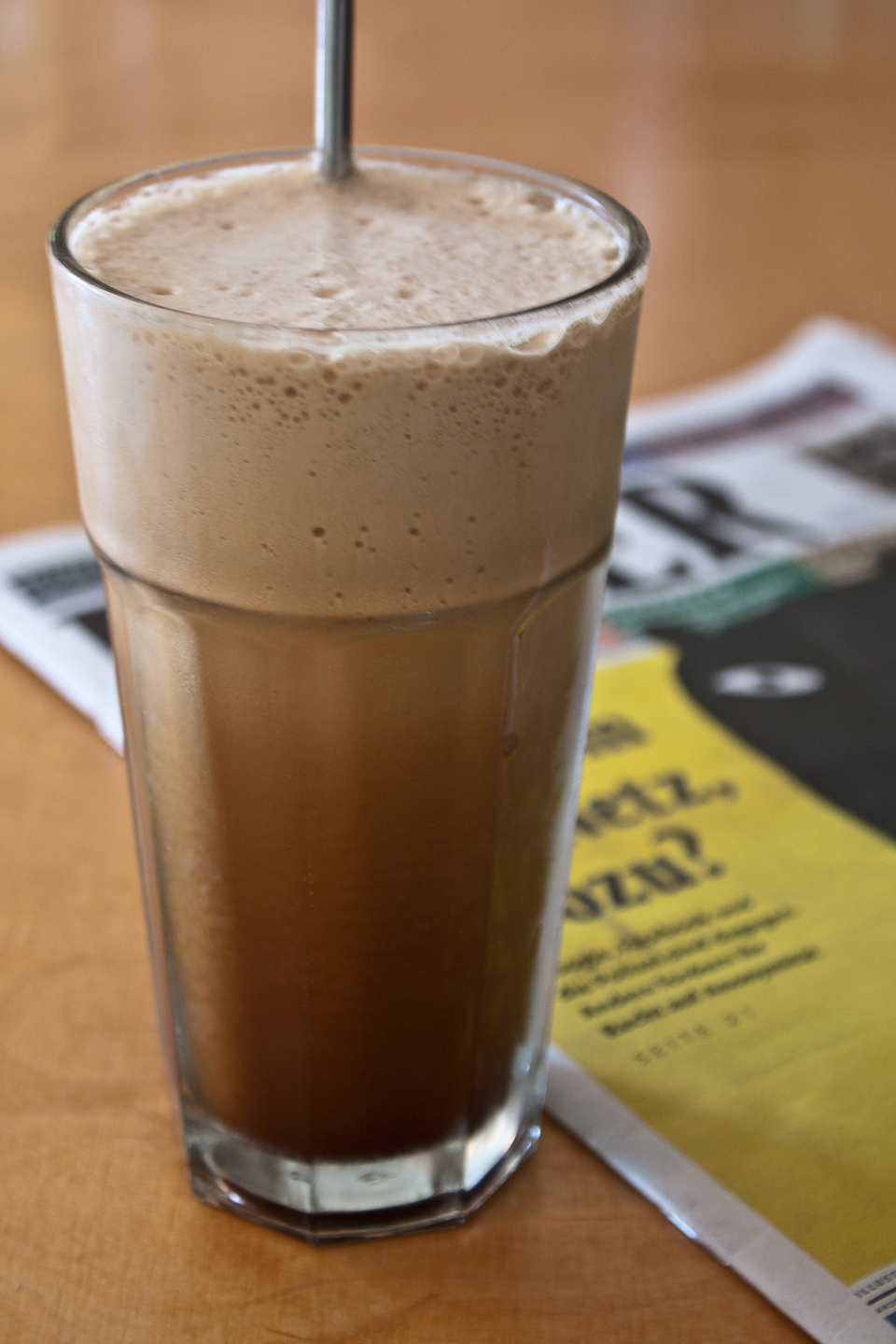
A café frappé

Greek frappé or café frappé (Greek: φραπές), sometimes called a javaccino by independent coffeehouses, is a foam-covered iced coffee drink made from spray-dried instant coffee. It is very popular in Greece especially during summer but has now spread to other countries.

=== Greek freddo preparations ===
==== Freddo espresso ====
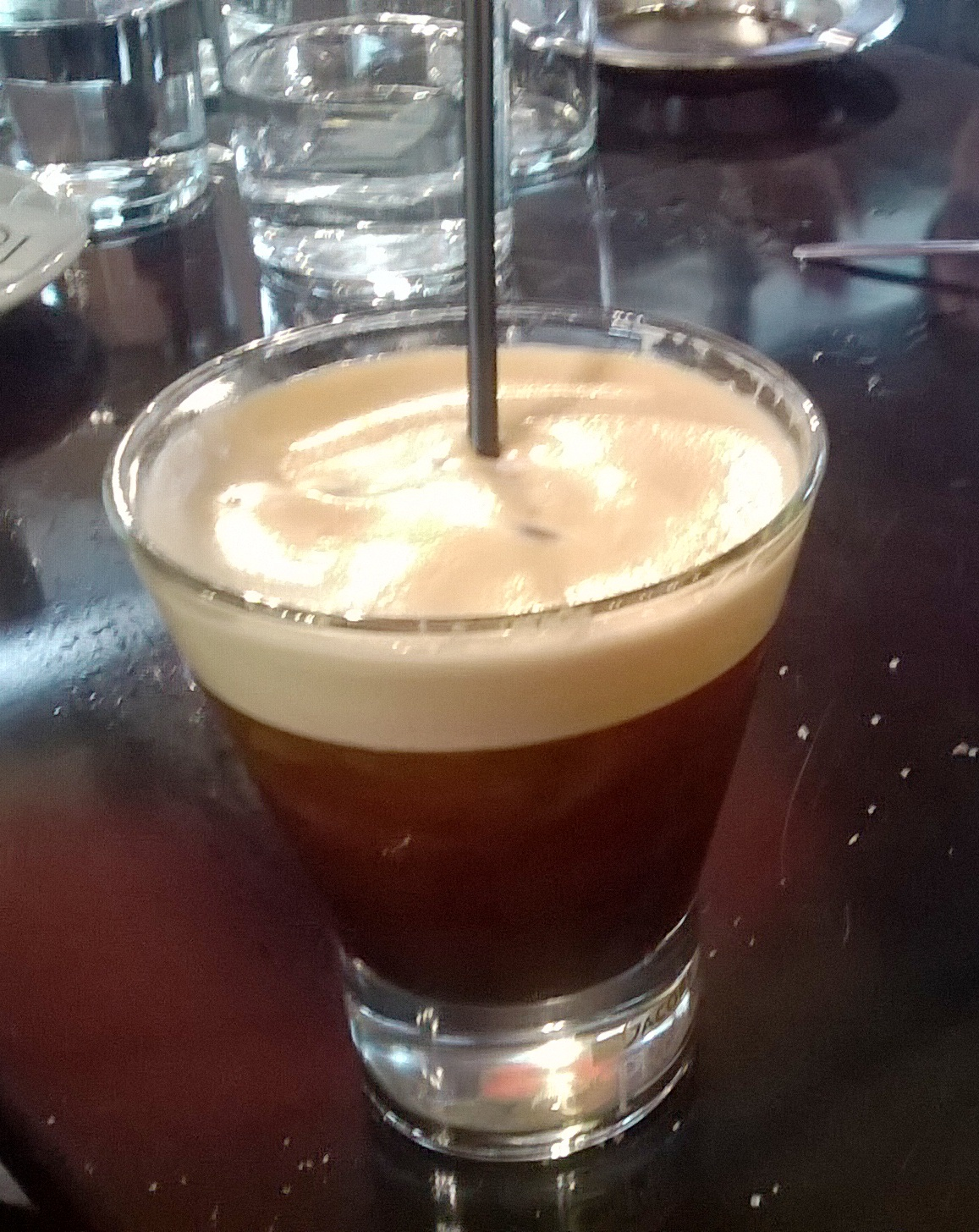
Freddo espresso

Freddo espresso is a foam-topped iced coffee made from espresso that is commonplace in Greece. It consists of two shots of espresso (30–50 ml [1.1–1.8 imp fl oz; 1.0–1.7 US fl oz]), sugar (granules or syrup), and ice (60–100 ml [2.1–3.5 imp fl oz; 2.0–3.4 US fl oz]) 1:2 (espresso shots:ice). The espresso is mixed with the sugar and ice in a frapièra (a drink mixer), which cools the espresso and produces a foam from the oils of the coffee. This mixture is then poured over ice into a serving glass.

==== Freddo cappuccino ====
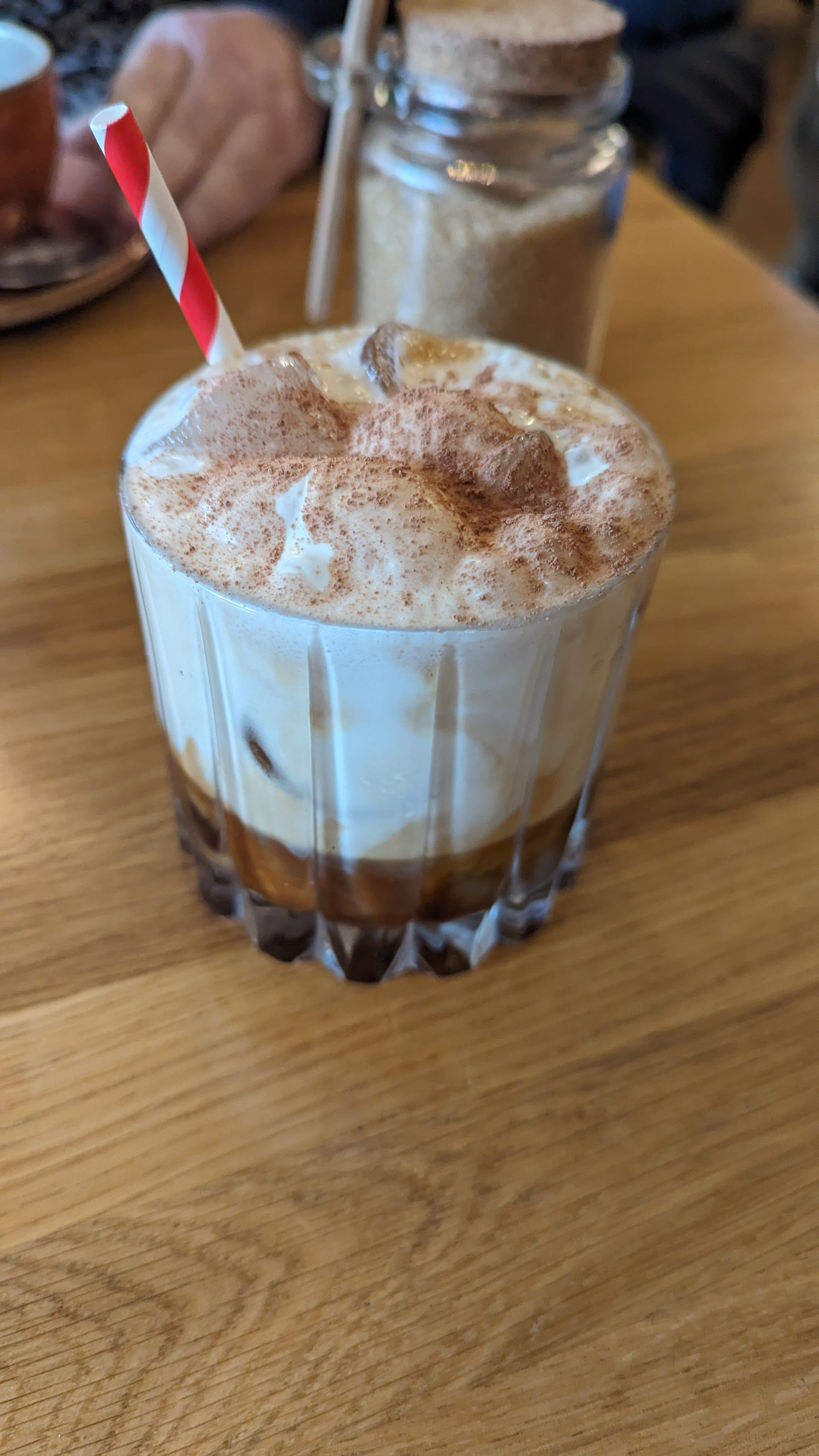
Freddo cappuccino

Freddo cappuccino is another variation of the original cappuccino and is as popular as the freddo espresso. It follows the same process as the freddo espresso but is topped with a cold milk froth called afrógala (Greek: αφρόγαλα) which is added in a ratio 1:2 (espresso shots:milk), and 1:2 (espresso shots:ice). The choice of milk used to create the afrógala may vary from fresh to condensed. Recently, the Coffee Island coffee shop (a coffee shop franchise in Greece) established a new foam and cream trend in freddo cappuccino. They use plant-based milk creamed in the frapièra. The result is a stiffer and sweeter cream.

=== Other ===
Shakerato

Shakerato is an iced coffee made by shaking espresso and ice cubes.

Espresso and tonic

An espresso and tonic is a non-alcoholic mixed drink made by mixing espresso and tonic water.

Ice shot

Originating in Australia, the minimal Ice Shot is a single shot of fresh espresso poured into an ordinary latté glass that has been filled with ice. The hot coffee, in melting some of the ice is diluted, re-freezing to a granita-like texture. The addition of a single scoop of ice-cream on top is a popular variant. No milk, sugar, extra flavouring or cream are involved.

== Instant coffee ==
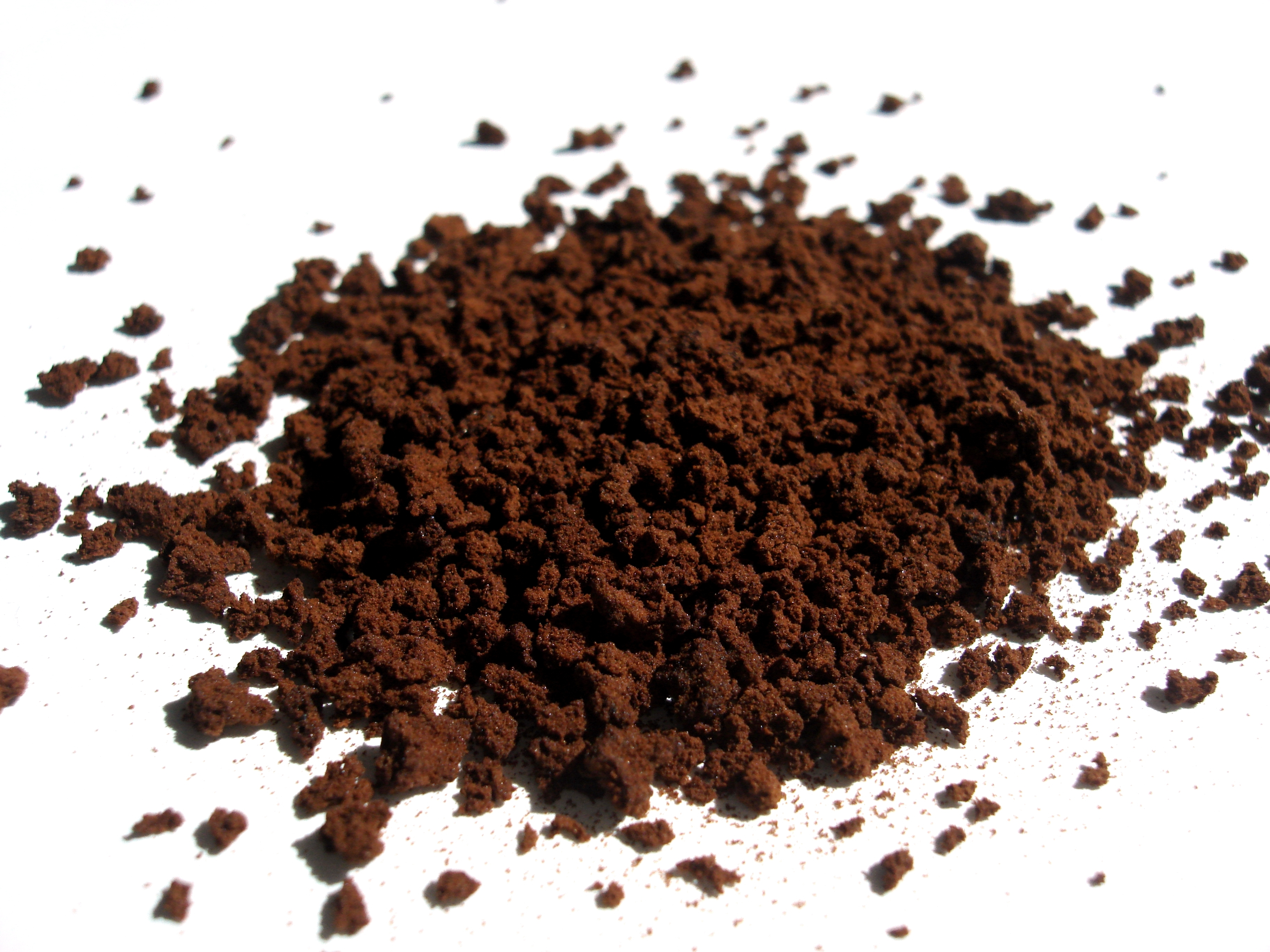
Instant coffee

Instant coffee is a drink derived from brewed coffee beans. Through various manufacturing processes, the coffee is dehydrated into the form of powder or granules. These can be rehydrated with hot water to provide a drink similar (though not identical) to conventional coffee. At least one brand of instant coffee, Camp Coffee, is also available in concentrated liquid form.

Instant coffee is used as an ingredient in other coffee drinks. Indian beaten coffee is made from instant coffee whipped with sugar and served over warm milk. A Korean drink known as dalgona coffee is prepared similarly but can be served hot or cold. A Greek frappé coffee is made again from instant coffee, sugar, and milk, but it is prepared in a cocktail shaker.

Instant coffee brands include:

- UCC
- Chock full o'Nuts
- Folgers
- Kenco
- Lavazza
- Maxwell House
- Moccona
- Mr. Brown Coffee
- Nescafé
- Sanka

== Decaffeinated ==
A decaffeination process removes caffeine from coffee beans to lower their caffeine content. Four main methods are used to extract caffeine from coffee beans:

- Soaking the beans in water, a method said to have been developed in Switzerland
- Washing beans in a solution of water and ethyl acetate
- Applying carbon dioxide, either as a liquid or in a supercritical state, to beans at high pressure
- Dissolving the caffeine with the solvent dichloromethane

Decaffeinated coffee grew in popularity over the last half of the 20th century, mainly due to health concerns that arose regarding the over-consumption of caffeine. Decaffeinated coffee, sometimes known as "decaf", may be drunk as regular brewed coffee, instant, espresso, or as a mix of regular caffeine beans and decaffeinated beans. Ludwig Roselius, a German coffee merchant and founder of the company Kaffee HAG, is credited with the development of commercial decaffeination of coffee.

== Other ==
=== Avocado coffee ===
Avocado coffee or kopi alpukat is an Indonesian coffee drink combined with avocado milkshake or commonly called jus alpukat.

=== Caffè Medici ===
A caffè Medici is a doppio poured over chocolate syrup and orange peel, usually topped with whipped cream. The drink originated at Seattle's historic Last Exit on Brooklyn coffeehouse.

=== Café Touba ===
Café Touba is the spiritual drink of Senegal, named after Cheik Ahmadou Bamba Mbacké (known as Serigne Touba) and the holy city of Touba in Senegal. During the roasting process, the coffee beans are mixed with grains of selim, and sometimes other spices, and ground into powder after roasting. The drink is prepared using a filter, similar to plain coffee. Sugar is often added before drinking.

=== Canned coffee ===
Canned coffee is ubiquitous in Japan and throughout East Asia, with a large number of companies competing fiercely and offering various types for sale. Canned coffee is already brewed and ready to drink. It is available in supermarkets and convenience stores, with vast numbers of cans being sold in vending machines that offer heated cans in the autumn and winter, and cold cans in the warm months.

Some brands in the United States have recently begun selling similar products in gas stations, grocery stores, and corner stores, though it is not nearly as widespread as the Japanese version is in Japan. Brands of canned coffee include these:

- UCC
- Folgers
- Mr. Brown Coffee

=== Coffee beer ===
Coffee beer is a drink from Jombang, Indonesia. The composition of coffee beer is coffee, sugar, water, caramel, and soda. Usually, the drink is served in a glass filled with ice cubes to add freshness to the drink. It contains no alcohol.

=== Coffee milk ===
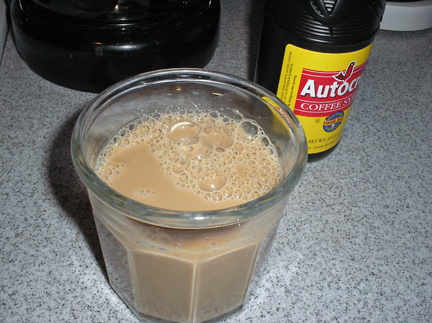
Coffee milk

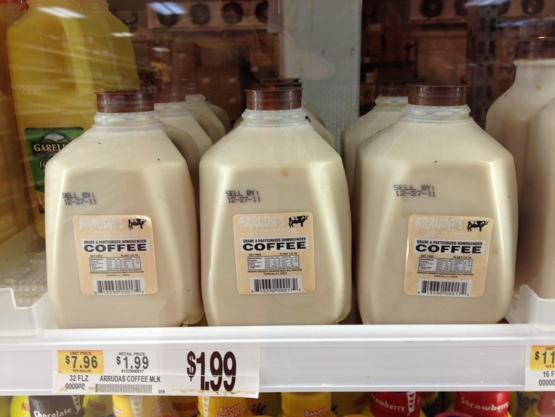
Prepared coffee milk in a supermarket dairy case

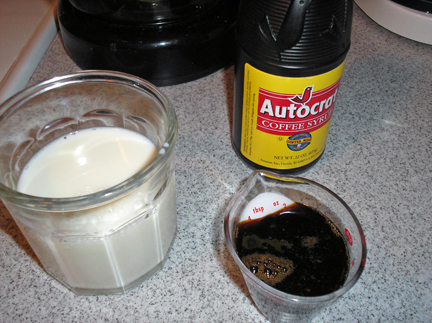
The ingredients for preparing coffee milk: coffee syrup and milk

Coffee milk is sold in two ways: prepared coffee milk and coffee syrup. It is a drink prepared or made by adding a sweetened coffee concentrate called coffee syrup to milk in a manner similar to chocolate milk. It is the official drink of Rhode Island in the United States. Coffee milk brands include:

- Farmers Union Iced Coffee (Australia) marketed as iced coffee
- Autocrat, LLC

It is popular in South Australia where it is known as iced coffee but that should not be confused with the drink of the same name made from coffee with ice but without milk or with little milk that is popular in the United States and other countries.

=== Double-double ===
Double-double or Double Double is a uniquely Canadian term that is also a registered trademark of Tim Hortons. This menu item consists of a cup of drip coffee with two creams and two sugars (or double cream, double sugar). The chain achieves flavor consistency across cup sizes by employing a pair of countertop vending machines, one dispensing cream and milk and the other dispensing white granulated sugar, with buttons for different cup sizes and amounts. The coffee is always poured over the cream and sugar to achieve the correct volume of ingredients. The drink can be made with cream or milk. Additional terms include the menu item "Regular" (one shot of each); a "triple-triple" (three shots of each); a "four-by-four" (four shots of each); and a "Wayne Gretzky" (nine shots of each), named in reference to Wayne Gretzky's jersey number 99. A "Wayne Gretzky" is more of a legend or joke than a feasible order; for comparison, a medium Regular has 6g fat and 11g sugar (approximately 3 tsp of cream and 2 1/2 tsp white sugar), so a Wayne Gretzky in a medium size would have nine times that amount: 54g fat and 99g of sugar, approximately 1/2 cup cream (27 teaspoons, or 118ml, or 4oz) and 2/5 cups of sugar (22 1/2 teaspoons). A medium cup is approximately 14oz (414ml), and would consist almost entirely of the cream and sugar.

=== Egg coffee ===
Egg coffee (Vietnamese: Cà phê trứng) is a Vietnamese drink from Hanoi with a thick texture, traditionally prepared with egg yolks, sugar, condensed milk and drip coffee.

== See also ==
- List of coffee dishes
- List of coffee varieties
- Low acid coffee
- Low caffeine coffee
- Coffee substitute
- Coffee preparation
- Sweetened beverage
