= Inclusive language =

Writing approach that avoids prejudiced or biased terms

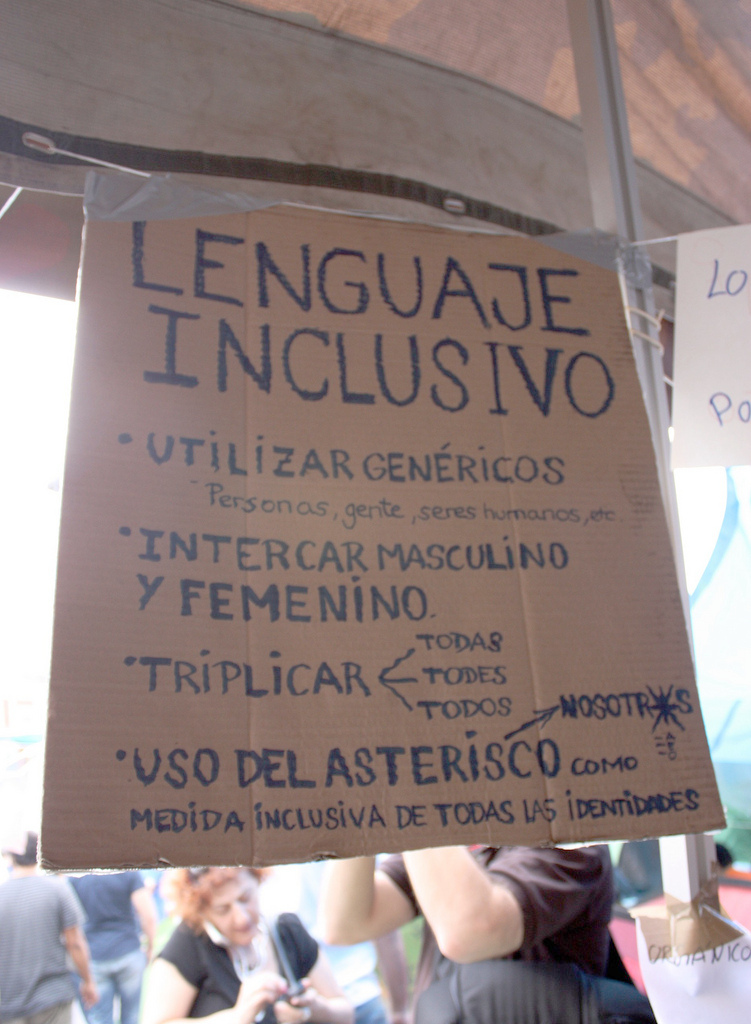
A cardboard sign calling for inclusive language at a feminist protest in Madrid, 2013, with basic usage instructions

Inclusive language is a language style that seeks to avoid expressions that its proponents perceive as expressing or implying ideas that are sexist, racist, or otherwise biased, prejudiced, or insulting to particular groups of people. It instead uses language intended by its proponents to avoid offense and fulfill the ideals of egalitarianism, social inclusion and equity. Its aim is bias-free communication, that attempts to be equally inclusive of people of all ethnicities, gender identities, sexual orientations, religious affiliations, abilities, and ages by communicating in a way that makes no assumptions about the receiver of such communication.

Its supporters argue that language is often used to perpetuate and spread prejudice and that creating intention around using inclusive language can help create more productive, safe, and profitable organizations and societies. The term "political correctness" is sometimes used to refer to this practice, either as a neutral description or with negative connotations by its opponents. Inclusive language is promoted as a matter of public policy in many countries and international organizations as well as corporations. Use of gender-neutral terminology has been controversial in languages where "all grammar is gendered", such as Spanish, French, Italian, Portuguese, and German; some areas have banned its use. Anti-gender movements, including actors identifying as gender-critical, have increasingly targeted inclusive language, especially in contexts where it affirms trans and non-binary identities. Scholars have described this resistance as part of a broader ideological backlash, often rooted in essentialist and binary notions of sex and gender, and aimed at policing language to delegitimize gender diversity.

Inclusive language is often adopted by following a language guide that lists words and expressions not to use and their substitutes. Others introduce principles to help identify concerns. Language guides are used by many organizations, especially non-profits (at least in the United States).

== Bias ==
An important part of communicating in a bias-free manner is by making sure to engage in meaningful conversations using bias-free language. The writer's word choice is vital in terms of effectively communicating in ways that do not offend the receiver. According to Locker, "Bias-free language is language that is sensitive to people's sex, race, age, physical condition and many other categories. Bias-free language does not discriminate and therefore includes all readers in a fair and friendly manner."

Bias exists everywhere, even if it is not always acknowledged. If a verbal or written communication includes any of the following, it may be biased:

1. Unsupported claims.
2. Extreme or inappropriate language.
3. For written text, there may be no clear author.
4. Spoken communication may have a speaker with a poor reputation.

These sources should be questioned for their bias because it could impact their validity in their points. Therefore, avoiding bias in all communication will ensure that the point is crystal clear and the speaker is trusted.

== Scope ==
=== France ===
In French, a reference to a mixed-gender group of friends would traditionally be written as "amis", but a gender-neutral variation changed its spelling to "ami·e·s." However, in May 2021, the Minister for Education wrote to schools across the country to say that "so-called 'inclusive' writing should be avoided, which notably uses the midpoint to simultaneously reveal the feminine and masculine forms of a word used in the masculine when it is used in a generic sense."

=== Argentina ===
As of June 2022, the city government of Buenos Aires, the capital of Argentina, banned teachers "from using any gender-neutral words during class and in communications with parents", on the grounds that it "violated the rules of Spanish and stymied students' reading comprehension". At least five organizations, "a mix of gay rights and civil rights groups", have filed lawsuits seeking to overturn" the ruling. The governor of Buenos Aires province, Axel Kicillof, rejected the authority of the Royal Spanish Academy, citing the Argentine War of Independence as a reason. Darío Villanueva Prieto, from the RAE, clarified that the RAE does not use the slang of Spanish language from the Iberian peninsula, but that it receives input from all countries in the world where the language is spoken.

=== Uruguay ===
In December 2021, Uruguay's public education agency issued a memo to limit use of inclusive language.

=== United States ===
Organizations in the U.S. with equity language guides include The Sierra Club, American Cancer Society, American Heart Association, American Medical Association, National Recreation and Park Association, Columbia University School of Professional Studies, and the University of Washington. According to George Packer, most of these guides are based on other guides such as A Progressive's Style Guide, the Racial Equity Tools glossary, and others. More recently, Karen Yin launched the Conscious Style Guide website and book.

Several tech companies promotes or provide inclusive language guides: Google, Apple, Microsoft, IBM, Cisco Talos, SAP.

== Examples ==
=== English ===
Inclusive language in English, at least in the United States, goes well beyond gender inclusivity, the following with varying levels or usage.

Rationale for suggested language change	Language or expression to be avoided, according to proponents	Replacement language proposed by proponents
To avoid implied sexism or heteronormativity with gender-neutral language	Steward/stewardess; Board of aldermen; Use of you guys to refer to a group that includes women; Manhole; Manpower; Manned; Assuming "he" or "she" based on occupation or spouse's gender	Flight attendant; City council; Gender-neutral marked plural, such as you all; Maintenance hole, utility hole, access point, service chamber; Staffing; Crewed, staffed; Singular "they", or "he or she"
To avoid sexism in any implication that women should follow "traditional" gender roles, are in any way unequal to men, are valued primarily as wives or sex objects, or that the unpaid work of women is less important than paid work	Girl (for an adult); Miss or Mrs.; Housewife	Young woman; Ms. or dropping honorifics entirely; homemaker
To avoid terminology that is disempowering, has negative connotations, or is subject to a euphemism treadmill with regard to: Race; Caste; Disability; Immigration status; Housing status; Health status	Negro, oriental (referring to a person); Untouchable; Crippled, imbecile or retarded; Illegal immigrant, refugee, citizens (referring to general population); Vagrant; Patient; Master, slave (in tech context); Blacklist, whitelist	"Black" or "African-American", Asian or East Asian or more specifically e.g. Korean, in general "person of color"; Dalit; Disabled or differently abled, intellectual disability; Undocumented immigrant, migrant, residents; Homeless, unhoused; Health care consumer, client, resident (for nursing homes); Primary/secondary, host/client; Block list, deny list, trust list, approved list, allow list
Avoid negative stereotypes of ethnic groups	To jew; To Welsh; To gyp (referring to gypsy or Romani people); A paddy wagon (possibly derived from an Irish ethnic slur)	To bargain down; To renege; To cheat or rip off; A police van
Avoiding racism, colonialism, and religious intolerance, whether overtly or by historical association	Any ethnic slur or religious slur; Anything that would be considered a microaggression; Use of the word "niggardly" (disputed due to distinct etymology from "nigger"); Use of the term "brown bag" instead of "sack lunch" (due to association with the brown paper bag test)	
Avoid sizeism and body shaming	"fat", "large", possibly "plus-sized model" or "plus-size clothing" in women's fashion	"curvy" or simply talk about "women of all sizes"
Avoid insulting human dignity by emphasizing the humanity of individuals rather than group label	"He is a gay."; "The demented"	"He is a gay person."; "People with dementia"
To avoiding implied racism or colonialism by using indigenous names instead of names used by colonizers	Indian, Bombay, primitive cultures	Native American (see Native American name controversy), Mumbai (see Renaming of cities in India, geographical renaming, and British Isles naming dispute), early cultures
Avoid offending non-Christians and non-believers (see War on Christmas)	Wishing strangers (whose religion is unknown) "Merry Christmas"; School break called "Christmas Vacation"; Numbering years with BC/AD meaning "before Christ" and "the year of the Lord" (anno Domini)	"Happy Holidays" or "Seasons Greetings"; Schools scheduling "Winter Vacation"; Numbering years with BCE/CE meaning "before common era" and "common era"
To avoid implied transphobia and binary genderism	Using "he" or "she" based on appearance or name	Asking people what pronouns they prefer to be addressed by, or introduce oneself with one's own gender pronouns (e.g. "My name is Chris and my pronouns are he/him/his.")
Taking a sex-positive position and avoiding slut-shaming	Prostitute	Sex worker
Avoid associations with slavery	Master/slave (technology)	Primary/secondary, leader/follower
Avoid association between ownership of animals and ownership of people (slavery) and in general anthropocentrism	Pet owner	Pet guardian, pet parent
Avoid stigma promoting discrimination against people with HIV/AIDS	Clean	HIV negative
Avoiding stigma with autism, and seeing various neurological conditions not as diseases to be cured, but differences to be embraced	Terms referring to people with autism; "healthy" or "normal"	'person with autism' (by proponents of people-first language) or 'autistic' (by proponents of identify-first language); "non autistic" to refer to people who are not autistic
Comments about personal appearance might be interpreted as lookism or sexual harassment, depending on the context.		

== Impact ==
=== Inclusion and divisiveness ===
Political correctness and inclusive language both focus on attempting to use neutral terms and expressions to influence psychological and social forces to combat prejudices, stereotypes, etc. However, what may be, and in many cases already has, happened is that while some markets and audiences embrace the new language, others react against it (an example being the alleged "War on Christmas"). Whether businesses and organizations embrace or reject the language, they risk alienating the opposing side. Thus inclusive language has become part of "culture wars".

=== Anti-gender opposition ===
Dorothee Beck writes that gender-inclusive language "is a trigger point for ‘anti-gender’ attacks," and describes it as "an important aspect of a broader political ‘crusade’ against gender." Lucy Jones writes, in her review of scholarly literature on language, gender, and sexuality, that anti-gender and gender-critical actors often resist the adoption of inclusive and nonbinary language, particularly in relation to pronouns and the recognition of transgender and nonbinary identities. Jones notes that gender-critical feminists frequently reject linguistic practices that affirm trans and nonbinary identities, often citing the preservation of "sex-based rights" as justification. She observes that this resistance is typically framed by a binary ideology that defines "woman" exclusively as someone assigned female at birth. Drawing on this scholarship, Jones characterizes gender-critical resistance to inclusive language as part of a broader "cisnormative preoccupation with trans people’s bodies" and a form of linguistic policing aimed at denying the legitimacy of trans and nonbinary identities. Jones situates these discursive patterns within a wider political context by citing Borba (2022), who examines the emergence of an "anti-gender register" used in trans-exclusionary discourse, including gender-critical feminism. Borba argues that this register draws on essentialist ideas about sex and gender and has gained traction through a process of enregisterment, a way of making certain ideological positions appear natural or commonsensical. He further suggests that this has been achieved in part by appropriating the language of feminist and LGBTQ+ antidiscrimination activism, reframing it to emphasize threats to the rights of cisgender women and children.

== See also ==
- Bias-free communication – Writing approach that avoids prejudiced or biased terms
- Cancel culture – Modern form of social rejection
- Color-blind casting – Casting practice in the performing arts
- Communication rights – Right to freely communicate
- Euphemism – Mild or indirect word or expression
- List of politically motivated renamings
- Newspeak – Fictional language in the novel "Nineteen Eighty-Four"
- Plain language – Clear, concise, comprehensible writing
- Speech code – Non-statutory restriction on word choice
- Stereotypes – Generalized belief about people
