= Doppio =

Type of espresso

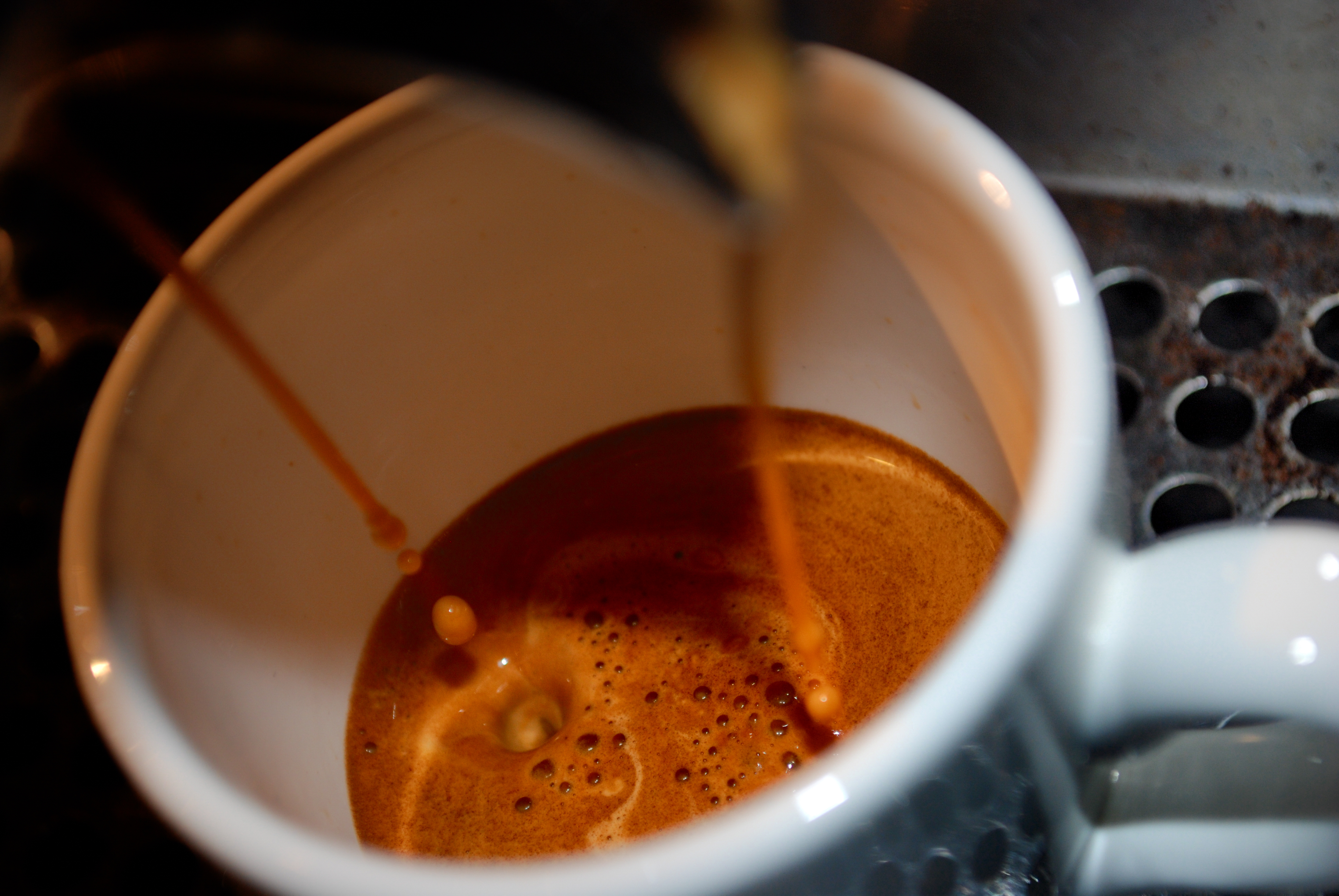
Extracting a doppio

Doppio espresso (Italian: [ˈdoppjo]) is a double shot which is extracted using double the amount of ground coffee in a larger-sized portafilter basket. This results in 60 ml (2.1 imp fl oz; 2.0 US fl oz) of drink, double the amount of a single shot espresso. Doppio is an Italian multiplier meaning 'double'. It is commonly called a standard double, due to its standard in judging the espresso quality in barista competitions, where four single espressos are made using two double portafilters.

A single shot of espresso, by contrast, is called a solo ('single') and was developed because it was the maximum amount of ground coffee that could practically be extracted by lever espresso machines. At most cafés outside of Italy, a doppio is the standard shot. Because solos require a smaller portafilter basket, solo shots are often produced by making ("pulling") a doppio in a two-spout portafilter and only serving one of the streams; the other stream may be discarded or used in another drink.

The caffeine content of a doppio can vary, but typically consists of 58–185 mg of caffeine, often averaging around 150 mg.

== See also ==
- List of coffee drinks
- Espresso
