= Long black =

Style of coffee

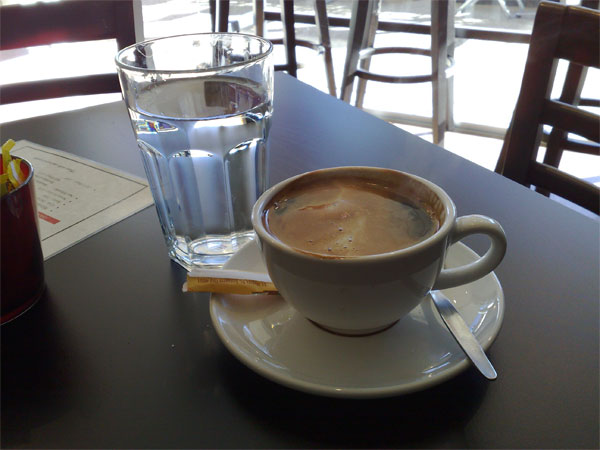
- Origin: Australia & New Zealand
- Introduced: 1950s and 1960s
- Color: Black

Long black is a style of coffee commonly found in Australia and New Zealand, introduced in the 1950s and 1960s made by pouring a double shot of espresso into hot water. It is similar to an americano, which uses hot water and one shot of espresso. However, unlike the long black, the Americano is made by pouring the hot water into the espresso, instead of the other way round.

Typically about 100–120 millilitres (4 ounces) of water is used, but the measurement is amenable to individual taste. The smaller ratio of water compared to an Americano gives it a stronger taste. Both retain the crema when brewed properly, though in the long black the crema will be more pronounced.

== See also ==
- List of coffee drinks
- Coffee culture in Australia
- Espresso (short black)
- Lungo – espresso made by allowing more water than usual to pass through the grounds
- Flat white
