= Low-acid coffee =

Coffee with pH above 5.5

Low acid coffee is any coffee above the critical pH level of 5.5 or has at least 50% less acid than regular coffee without any additives or treatments.

== Regular coffee pH ==
Low-acid coffee uses untreated green coffee beans and does not include any additives. It has a lower concentration of acidic compounds, particularly chlorogenic acids, resulting in a higher pH and less acidic taste compared to regular coffee.

The average pH of coffee ranges from 4.85 to 5.1, with a standard deviation of 0.2. Factors influencing the pH variation of coffee (4.9 – 5.3) primarily include the degree of roast. Research from the Latvian Academy of Sciences indicates that the pH varies from 5.0 in light roasts to 5.3 in dark roasts, highlighting roasting color as the most significant determinant of pH in brewed coffee.

Other factors thought to influence coffee's pH include the initial pH of the green coffee bean, varying by type (Arabica or Robusta) and its chemical composition. Arabica beans have a pH between 5.0 and 5.5, while Robusta ranges from 5.3 to 6.0. However, the complex roasting and brewing processes obscure the direct impact of green coffee pH on brewed coffee pH. The consistent pH range in brewed coffee suggests minimal influence from green coffee pH, primarily due to chlorogenic acid compounds formed during roasting.

These conclusions were further explored in 2007 by K. Fujioka and T. Shibamoto of the University of California, Davis. The study which was published in Food Chemistry analyzed the pH and chlorogenic acid content of various commercial coffee brands. The pH of the brewed coffees ranged from 4.95 to 5.99 for regular coffee and from 5.14 to 5.80 for decaffeinated coffee, with the brand exhibiting the highest pH also having the lowest total chlorogenic acid concentration (5.26 mg/g for regular, 2.10 mg/g for decaf). The researchers found a moderate correlation between coffee's pH and its chlorogenic acid content, suggesting that the acidity of coffee is related to the presence of these compounds. The study also indicated that roasting conditions could impact the final chlorogenic acid content and acidity of the brewed coffee, with darker roasts typically having lower levels of chlorogenic acids.

In 2009, a follow-up study conducted by Joon-Kwan Moon, Hyui Sun Yoo, and Takayuki Shibamoto of the University of California, Davis was published in the Journal of Agricultural and Food Chemistry investigated the relationship between the chlorogenic acid content and pH of various coffee samples. The researchers found that the pH of the brewed coffee was correlated with the total chlorogenic acid concentration, with lower chlorogenic acid levels associated with higher pH values (lower acidity). The study also demonstrated that roasting conditions impact the final chlorogenic acid content, with darker roasts (250 °C for 21 minutes) reducing chlorogenic acids by over 99% compared to green coffee beans. The findings suggest that the roasting process can be optimized to produce low-acid coffee while still retaining some level of chlorogenic acids, which have potential health benefits. These roasts successfully lowered their acid levels, departing from the typical coffee pH range of 5.1 ± 0.2 pH. However, as Shibamoto noted, samples from these roasting levels were almost charred and not drinkable, corroborating his 2007 paper's assertion that extreme roasting leads to unpalatable coffee to achieve higher pH levels. This helps explain why commercially brewed coffees do not exceed a pH of 5.3, as the taste becomes unacceptable.

== Low-acid coffee ==
In 2015, this prompted another study conducted by Masumi Kamiyama Joon-Kwan Moon, Hae Won Jang, Takayuki Shibamoto of the University of California, Davis was published in the Journal of Agricultural and Food Chemistry investigated the relationship between the degradation of chlorogenic acids, a major component in coffee beans, and the antioxidant activity and acidity of the resulting coffee. The study found that roasting coffee beans at higher temperatures, such as 250 °C, resulted in greater breakdown of chlorogenic acids compared to lower temperatures. This degradation led to the formation of potent antioxidant compounds, including pyrocatechol and 2-methoxy-4-vinylphenol. The study also observed an inverse correlation between the total chlorogenic acid content and the pH of the brewed coffee, with lower chlorogenic acid levels corresponding to higher pH values (lower acidity). These findings suggest that the roasting process, particularly at higher temperatures, plays a role in producing low-acid coffee with increased antioxidant activity. The study involved six typical brands of ground, roasted coffee beans sourced from a local market, identified as brands I through VI. Previous findings highlighted that brand VI had the lowest acidity and the least chlorogenic acid (CQA) content among the brands. Given the strong correlation between CQA levels and antioxidant activity in roasted coffees, four varieties of brand VI (VIa, VIb, VIc, VId) were further examined for their antioxidant potential. Results showed that brand VI, across all its varieties, possessed 5.4 times the antioxidant activity compared to other commercial brands. This higher antioxidant activity was attributed to the high pH (5.99) of brand VI, which promotes the degradation of chlorogenic acids into volatile antioxidants during brewing, unlike coffees with lower pH levels. This supports the idea that higher pH levels in coffee can enhance the formation of beneficial phenolic compounds.

Shibamoto presented his findings at the 246th National ACS convention in Indianapolis, where he received the AFGD Award.

In a 2024 study conducted by Abdulhakim Sharaf Eddin, Philip Junior Yeboah, Salam A. Ibrahim of the North Carolina A&T State University and published in Bioactive Compounds in Health and Disease, researchers investigated the pH and total dissolved solids (TDS) content of 11 commercially available coffee products claiming to be low in acid. The researchers found that the pH values ranged from 4.97 to 5.72, with only one sample having a significantly higher pH (5.72) compared to the others and exceeding the critical pH threshold of 5.5 for beverages. The majority of the samples had pH values between 5.0 and 5.29, which falls within the expected range for regular commercial coffee. The study also noted that factors such as roasting temperature, grind size, bean composition, and extraction time can influence the final pH and TDS of the brewed coffee.

The study found that nearly all tested coffees had high acidity despite labeling claims. The authors recommended establishing standardized definitions for low-acid coffee based on a critical pH of 5.5.

== Health effects ==
It is particularly beneficial for individuals with sensitive stomachs or conditions like gastroesophageal reflux disease (GERD), as it minimizes gastric discomfort that can be exacerbated by the caffeine and acidity found in regular coffee.

Low acid coffee was originally produced as a smoother gourmet coffee option. It was only discovered as an alternative to regular coffee when its lower acid levels were confirmed in reported studies. Therefore, with a smoother taste profile, it remains a viable option for those seeking to mitigate symptoms such as heartburn, chest pain, and chronic cough associated with GERD. Additionally, increasing awareness of the health impacts of acidic and alkaline foods has led to a broader acceptance of products like low-acid coffee alongside other pH-balanced alternatives.

Exercise has been shown to weaken the lower esophageal sphincter temporarily, increasing the risk of acid reflux. This is particularly relevant when consuming coffee in conjunction with activities such as running, which can exacerbate reflux and induce nausea.

A PH of 5.5 is also the critical threshold for accelerated demineralization in teeth by way of dissolving the hydroxyapatite of tooth enamel. Thus drinking a low-acid coffee is preferable for dental health compared to drinking normal coffee, especially for those with already weakened enamel. However even low-acid coffee should still be avoided by those with exposed dentin, as it has a higher critical PH threshold of 6.0-6.2.

== Uses ==
While not exclusively used in geriatric care, low-acid coffee is often erroneously associated solely with older consumers, overlooking its broader appeal to those with health sensitivities or diagnosed stomach conditions.

== See also ==
- Low caffeine coffee
