= Lungo =

Type of coffee drink

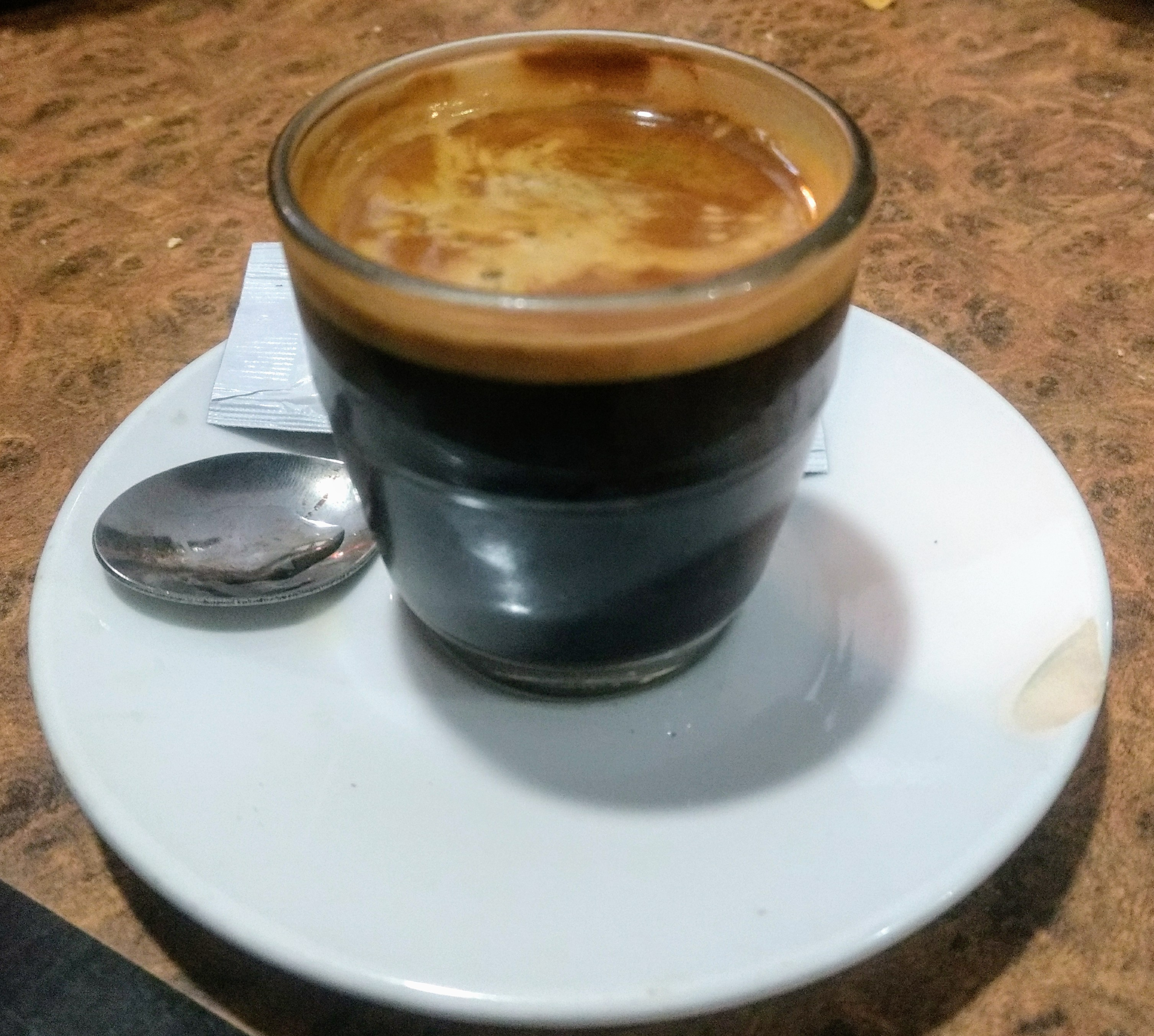
Lungo

Lungo (lit. 'long'), known in full in Italian as caffè lungo, is a coffee made by using an espresso machine to make an Italian-style coffee—short black (a single espresso shot) with more water (generally twice as much), resulting in a larger coffee ("lungo").

A normal serving of espresso takes from 18 to 30 seconds to pull, and fills 25–30 millilitres (0.9–1.1 imp fl oz; 0.8–1.0 US fl oz), while a lungo may take up to a minute to pull, and might fill 50–70 millilitres (1.8–2.5 imp fl oz; 1.7–2.4 US fl oz). Extraction time of the dose is determined by the variety of coffee beans (usually a blend of arabica and robusta), their grind, and the pressure of the machine. It is usually brewed using an espresso machine, but with twice the amount of water to the same weight of coffee, to make a much-longer drink.

In French, it is called café allongé and is popular in the Canadian province of Quebec.

== Flavour ==
As the amount of water increases or decreases relative to a normal shot, the composition of the shot changes because the flavour components of coffee dissolve at varying rates. For this reason, a long or short shot will not contain the same ratio of components that a normal shot contains. Therefore, a ristretto is not simply twice as "strong" as a regular shot, nor is a lungo simply half the strength. Moreover, since espresso is brewed under pressure, a lungo does not have the same taste or composition as coffee produced by other methods, even when made with the same ratio of water and ground coffee.

== Brewing ==
Ristretto, normale, and lungo are relative terms without exact measurements. Nevertheless, a rough guide is a grounds-to-liquid brewing ratio of 1:1 for ristretto, 1:2 for normale, and 1:4 for lungo.

== See also ==
Media related to Lungo at Wikimedia Commons

- List of coffee drinks
- Caffè americano – hot water added to espresso (in that order)
- Long black – espresso added to hot water (in that order); famous in Australia
- Ristretto – half-length extraction; the opposite of a lungo
