= Caffè americano =

American and Italian coffee

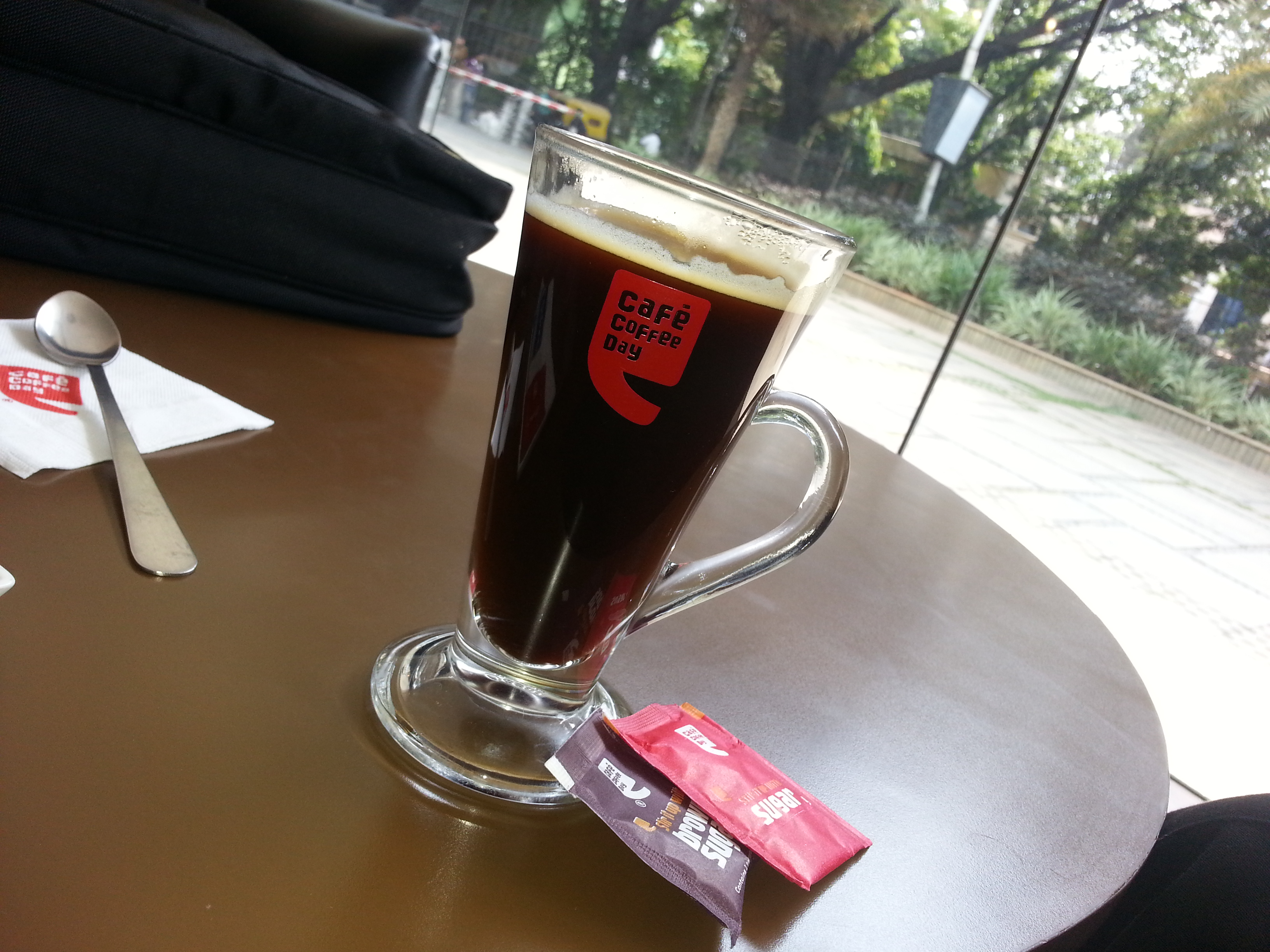
- Caffè americano served in Bengaluru
- Alternative names: Long black
- Region or state: United States; Italy
- Main ingredients: Steaming hot water and espresso

Caffè americano (Italian: [kafˈfɛ ameriˈkaːno]; Portuguese and Spanish: café americano; lit. 'American coffee'), also known as americano or American, is an espresso shot with hot water at a 1:3 to 1:4 ratio, resulting in a drink that retains the complex flavors of espresso, but in a lighter way. Its strength varies with the number of shots of espresso and the amount of water added. The name of the drink may also be written with Italian spelling and diacritics as "caffè americano", or Portuguese and Spanish spelling and diacritics as "café americano".

== Naming ==
Americano means 'American' in Italian, Spanish, and Portuguese. Some assert the term entered English from Italian in the 1970s. Caffè americano specifically is Italian for 'American coffee'. There is a popular belief that the name has its origins in World War II when American G.I.s in Italy diluted espresso with hot water to approximate the coffee to which they were accustomed. However, the Oxford English Dictionary cites the term as a borrowing from Central American Spanish café americano, a derisive term for mild coffee, dating back to the middle of the 1950s. Its first use in English appeared in the Jamaican newspaper The Sunday Gleaner in 1964. The term caffè americano entered Italian later than the English or Spanish uses, suggesting the term originates outside of Italy.

In Italy, caffè americano may mean either espresso with hot water or long-filtered coffee, but the latter is more precisely called caffè all'americana (lit. 'American-style coffee').

Following proposals to annex Canada by President Donald Trump in 2025, some cafés in Canada have begun re-branding the americano as "canadiano" on their menus.

== Preparation ==
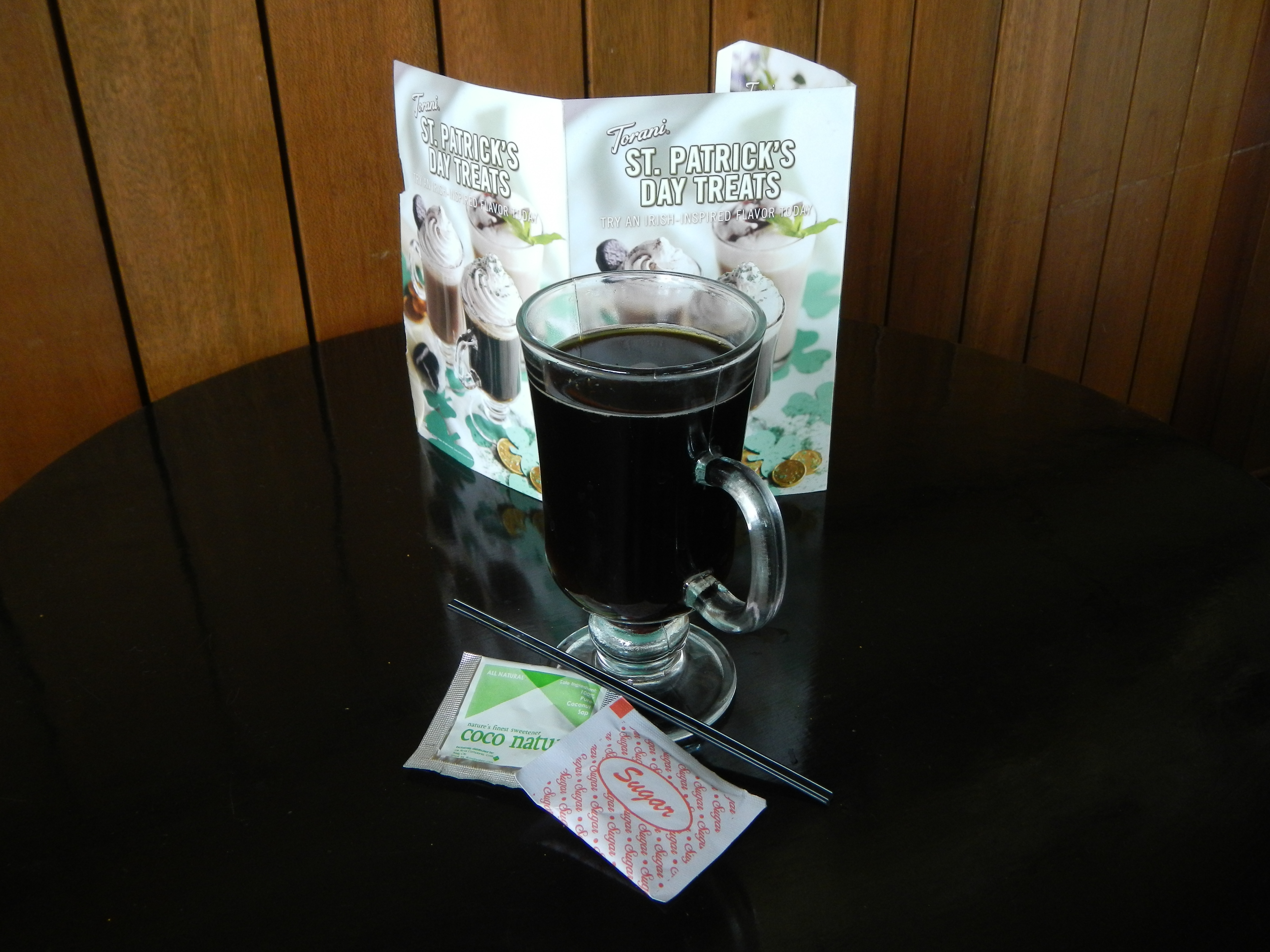
Americano as served in the Philippines

The drink consists of a single shot of espresso mixed with added water. Typically about 120 milliliters (4 imp fl oz; 4 U.S. fl oz) – 180 milliliters (6 imp fl oz; 6 U.S. fl oz) of hot water mixed with the espresso.

Long black is an Australasian drink similar to the americano (in contrast to short black for espresso), with an emphasis being placed on the order of preparation, adding water to the cup first before pouring one or two espresso on top.

In the western U.S., Italiano sometimes refers to a short americano with equal amounts of espresso and water (lungo).

== Variations ==
- A long black is made in the reverse order, by pouring an espresso shot into hot water. This helps keep the espresso's crema intact.
- The iced americano is made by combining espresso with cold water instead of hot water. The espresso is sometimes poured over ice. The iced americano is considered to be an unofficial national beverage in South Korea, where it is nicknamed "ah-ah". Its dedicated drinkers have a name, "eoljuka", which is a contraction of a Korean phrase meaning "even if I freeze to death, iced Americano!".
- Water added to espresso is known in many circles as an original americano.
- A red eye is made by combining a shot of espresso with drip coffee instead of hot water, and may be called a shot in the dark.

== See also ==
- List of coffee drinks
- Politically motivated food name changes
