= 2018 Melbourne stabbing attack =

Terror attack in 2018 in Melbourne, Australia

- Location: Bourke Street, Melbourne, Australia
- Date: 9 November 2018; 4:20 pm (AEDT)
- Target: Pedestrians
- Attack type: Stabbing
- Weapon: Knife
- Deaths: 2 (including the attacker)
- Injuries: 2
- Perpetrator: Hassan Khalif Shire Ali
- Motive: Inspired by the Islamic State

On 9 November 2018, a mass stabbing took place at Bourke Street in the Melbourne central business district, Australia. One person was killed and two others were injured before the perpetrator, Hassan Khalif Shire Ali, was shot dead by Victoria Police.

On 10 November, the Victorian Premier Daniel Andrews confirmed that the attack was "an act of terror" and is being treated as such by counter-terrorism police from both the Victoria Police and the Australian Federal Police. Police also confirmed that the attack was Islamic State-inspired.

== Incident ==
On 9 November 2018, at around 4:20 pm, a man set fire to a Holden Rodeo ute on Bourke Street between Swanston and Russell Streets, in the Melbourne central business district. The attacker emerged from the vehicle before it burst into flames. Police stated that there were propane gas cylinders in the vehicle, but they did not explode.

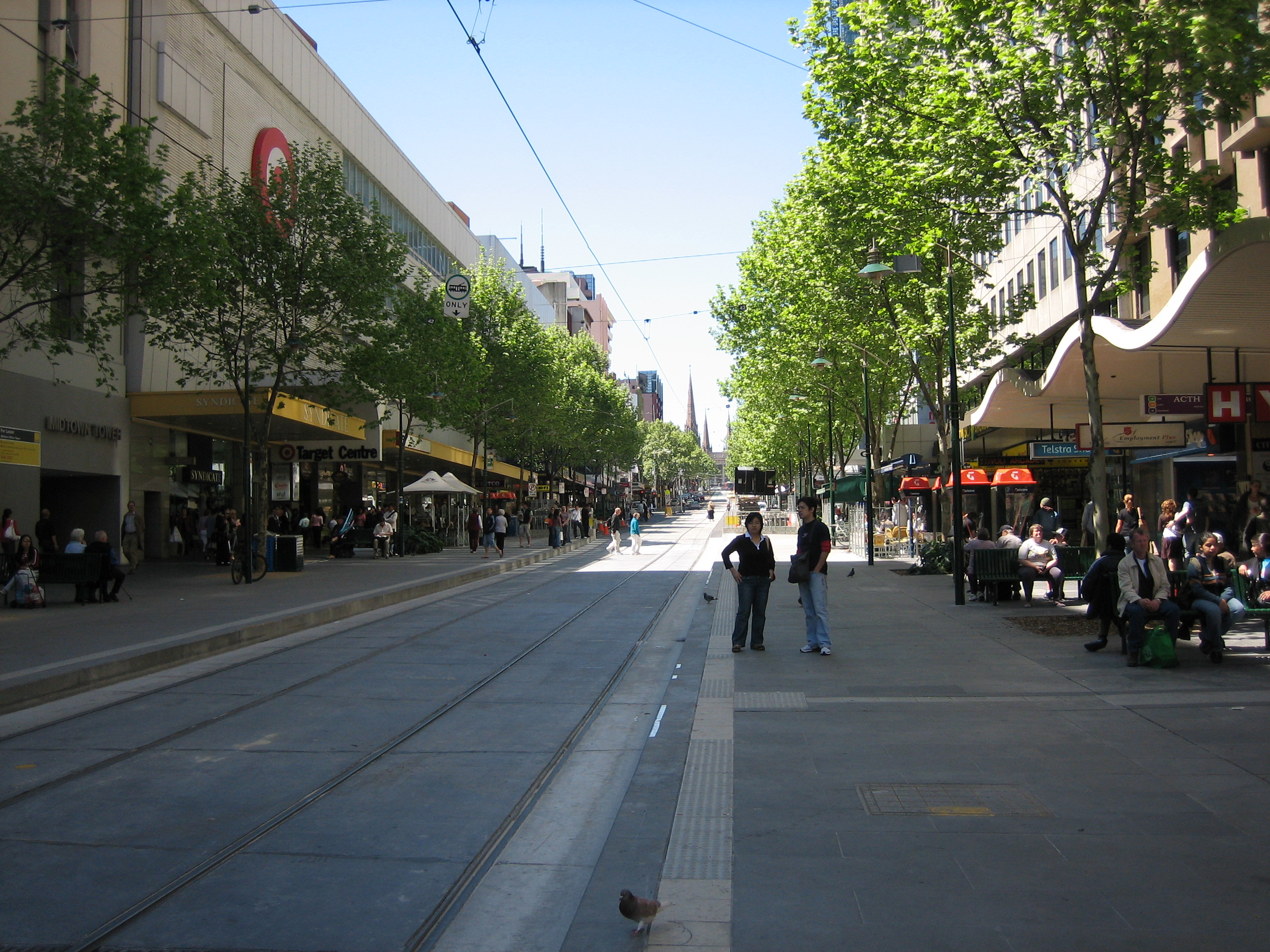
Bourke Street, near the location of the attack

The man then went on a stabbing spree with a large knife and wounded three pedestrians, one of whom later died at the scene. The attacker was then confronted by two Victoria Police patrol officers, a member of the public also attempted to ram a shopping trolley into the attacker. After slashing at the police officers, the attacker was shot once in the chest by one of the officers. The attacker was then disarmed and restrained by Critical Incident Response Team (CIRT) members utilising less lethal tactics before being taken to receive medical treatment under guard, but later died in hospital.

On 10 November, the day following the attack, Victorian Premier Daniel Andrews confirmed that "what we saw yesterday was an act of terror." The Guardian has described that he has expressed confidence in the Victoria Police to ensure the safety of Melbourne. Officers from both the Victoria Police and from the Australian Federal Police were involved in a counter-terrorism investigation.

== Perpetrator ==
Police identified the attacker as 30-year-old Hassan Khalif Shire Ali, who moved to Australia from Somalia in the 1990s with his parents and siblings and attended Al-Taqwa Islamic College. He was married with a young son.

The Chief Commissioner of Victoria Police, Graham Ashton, told the media that the attacker was known to federal intelligence agencies but was not actively monitored. The Australian Federal Police's acting national manager of counter-terrorism said Hassan's passport was cancelled in 2015 when the Australian Security Intelligence Organisation believed he was planning to travel to Syria to fight for the ISIL terrorist group, but he was never a target of joint counter-terrorism taskforce investigations as they did not believe he was a threat. Relatives and acquaintances have described Hassan as having mental health and substance abuse issues, being delusional and agitated prior to the attack, and complaining of "being chased by unseen people with spears."

Hassan's 21-year-old younger brother, Ali Khalif Shire Ali, was arrested in November 2017 for planning to commit a mass shooting at Melbourne's New Year's Eve celebration. Ali Khalif pled guilty to preparing a terrorist attack and in May 2020, he was sentenced to ten years jail, with a seven and a half years non-parole period. On 18 December 2020, Ali Khalif's sentence was increased to sixteen years, with a non-parole period of twelve years.

== Victims ==
Sisto Malaspina, aged 74, was killed when the perpetrator stabbed him above his collar bone. Eyewitnesses said it appeared Malaspina was walking over to the car after it burst into flames to offer assistance when he was stabbed. A former nurse tried to revive him by performing CPR, but the knife had severed a major artery. Malaspina was the co-owner of Pellegrini's Espresso Bar, a nearby Italian coffee bar. Flowers, messages and photos have been laid in front of the shop as a tribute.

The other two people injured were a 58-year-old retired businessman from Launceston, Tasmania, who suffered knife injuries to the head and was taken to the Alfred Hospital for surgery and a 24-year-old security guard from Hampton Park who received lacerations and was taken to the Royal Melbourne Hospital after being assessed by Ambulance Victoria paramedics.

== Aftermath ==
Sisto Malaspina was honoured with a state funeral on 19 November 2018, and a memorial and plaque were installed on the street outside of his restaurant on Bourke Street.

== See also ==
- January 2017 Melbourne car attack
- December 2017 Melbourne car attack
- Bondi Junction stabbings
