= 2017 Melbourne car attack =

2017 Melbourne car attack may refer to:

- January 2017 Melbourne car attack, which occurred on 20 January
- December 2017 Melbourne car attack, which occurred on 21 December
