= Mount White =

Mount White may refer to:

- Mount White (Antarctica)
- Mount White (Colorado)
- Mount White, New South Wales, Australia

== See also ==
- Mont Blanc (disambiguation), French for Mount White
