= Little Victories Coffee Roasters =

Coffee roaster in Ottawa, Ontario, Canada

Restaurant information
- Established: 2016
- Owners: Andrew Bassett; Jeremie Thompson
- Food type: Cafe
- Location: 44 Elgin Street, Ottawa, Ontario, Canada
- Other locations: 2
- Website: www.lvcoffee.ca

Little Victories Coffee Roasters is a coffee roastery and small chain of cafes located in Ottawa, Ontario.

== History ==
The business was started by Andrew Bassett and Jeremie Thompson, two friends who had worked as baristas since their teenage years and sought to open their own concept. The pair started out selling their beans from the back of a bicycle repair shop in Ottawa's Hintonburg neighbourhood in 2016, before opening their first brick-and-mortar location in The Glebe in 2017.

During the early stages of the COVID-19 pandemic the cafe temporarily closed to in-person dining and switched to becoming a coffee bean delivery service to stay afloat.

They opened a second location in 2021, serving as the cafe's flagship, on Ottawa's Elgin Street and around the corner from Parliament Hill. A third location, focused entirely on pour over and AeroPress-style coffee, opened in 2024, situated in Downtown Ottawa.

== Concept ==
The cafe offers Australian-style coffee, including items rarely found in Canada such as Aussie capps and magic coffee.

It discourages individuals from using the cafe to work, not providing wi-fi and treating the business as a "destination driver", providing an attractive space where individuals would feel comfortable sitting with friends and have conversations.

As a coffee roaster, Little Victories also sells its beans directly to consumers and to other restaurants and coffee shops for use.

== Recognition ==
The cafe ranked #71 in the debut World's Best Coffee Shops list, one of three Canadian coffee shops to appear on the list.

Online coffee publication Sprudge recommended Little Victories as a must-visit cafe in Ottawa, highlighting its Australian-style drinks.
