= Marios (cafe) =

Café in Melbourne, Australia

Coordinates: 37°47′53″S 144°58′42″E

Marios Cafe is an Australian café located at 303 Brunswick Street in the inner-city Melbourne suburb of Fitzroy. The cafe was established on 28 April 1986 by business partners Mario Maccarone and Mario De Pasquale. On 28th April 2026, the cafe celebrated its 40th Birthday.

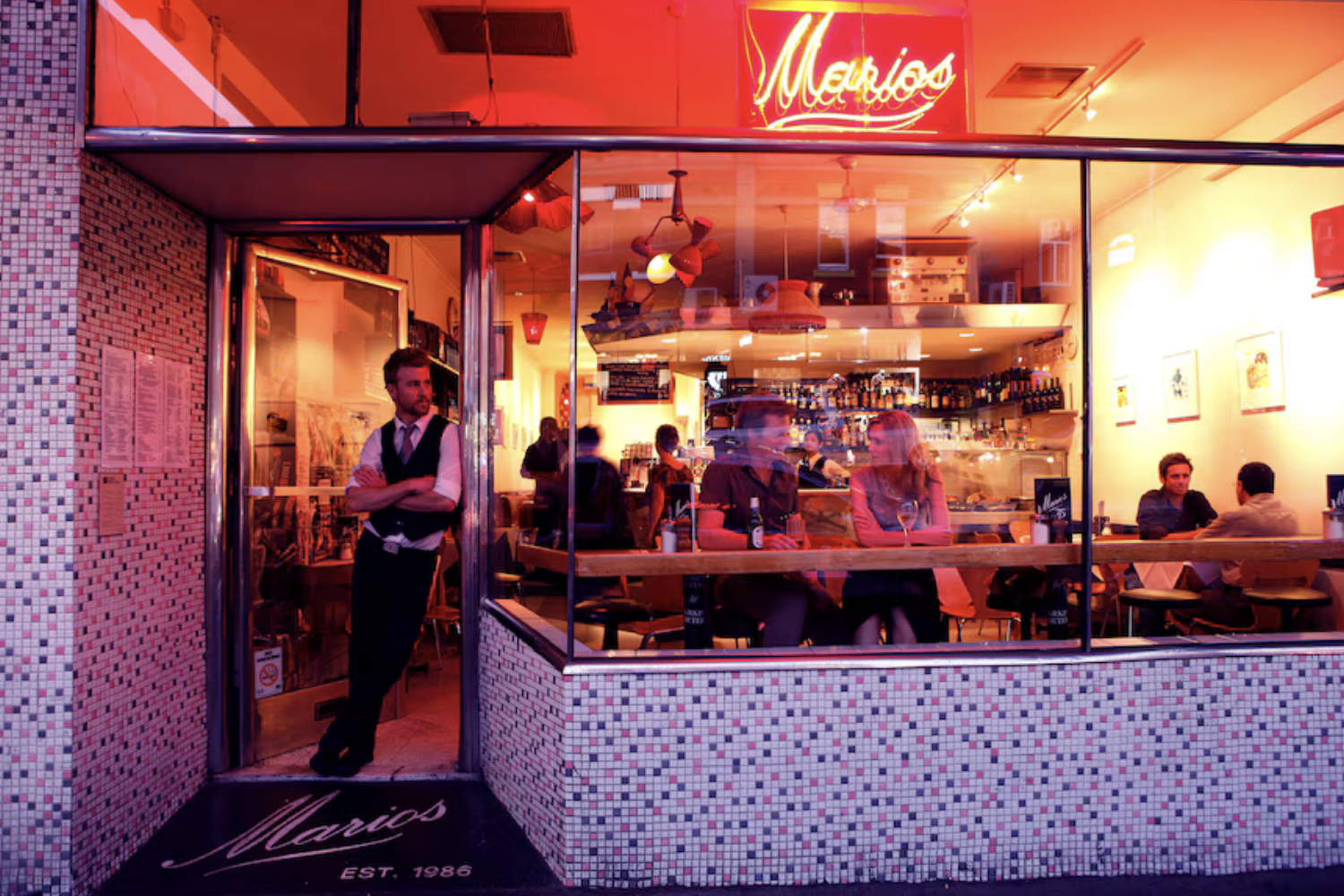
Marios staff member Dan Barron out front

== History ==
The founders, both Italian-Australian waiters with backgrounds in Melbourne's fine dining sector, met while working at Tsindos Bistrot and later spent time at Mietta's Restaurant. Rather than replicating the formality of those venues, they sought to create an inclusive, everyday dining experience in what was then a run-down, bohemian area of Fitzroy. At the time of opening, Fitzroy had only a small number of cafés, most of which served little more than coffee and light meals. Drawing inspiration from Italian institutions such as Pellegrini's and Tiamo, the founders combined fine dining elements, such as white tablecloths and uniformed waitstaff, with a casual and affordable format. The menu focused on Italian food and coffee at comparatively moderate prices for local residents.

In the 1980s, Melbourne's hospitality venues were often characterised as either pubs or formal restaurants. Marios operated within a different segment of the market, attracting a range of patrons including students, artists, musicians, writers and activists. Reports have noted that the venue was frequented by a diverse clientele and was associated with Fitzroy's cultural and social environment.

== Architectural and stylistic evolution ==
The physical character of Marios Cafe has changed little since its opening. It occupies a Victorian-era shopfront on Brunswick Street, with an interior that has remained deliberately consistent. Features have included Jazz music, white tablecloths and black-vested waitstaff. The décor has also included rotating art exhibitions, shelves lined with coffee jars and wine bottles, and the red Marios signage at the entrance.

Although Fitzroy underwent gentrification during the 1990s and 2000s, changes at Marios have been incremental. The menu continues to feature longstanding Italian dishes such as lasagne, spaghetti bolognese, carbonara, pesto and puttanesca, alongside seasonal specials. Some staff have remained employed at the cafe for extended periods. This continuity in décor, menu and personnel has contributed to the café's status as a local institution.

The egalitarian ethos of the establishment has also endured. Reservations are not taken, and no preferential treatment is given to high-profile individuals. A widely reported example occurred in the 1990s when American comedian Jerry Seinfeld attempted unsuccessfully to secure a table booking, later expressing his frustration publicly. It was reported at the time that Mr Seinfeld quipped that Melbourne was “...the anus of the world.”

== Influence on the arts and music scene ==
Since 1988, Marios Cafe has hosted rotating exhibitions of works by local artists. These exhibitions change every few weeks, with all sale proceeds directed to the artists themselves. The initiative has provided emerging artists with exposure and has effectively positioned the café as both a dining venue and an accessible exhibition space. Over the years, notable figures such as Barry Humphries and Kylie Minogue, Cate Blanchett, Nick Cave and Heath Ledger have been observed among its patrons.

== Notable events and legacy ==
In 2016, the café marked its 30th anniversary with a celebration in which menu prices were rolled back to 1986 levels, attracting long queues along Brunswick Street for $1 coffees and $4.50 lasagne. The café has also had broader influence on Victoria's hospitality sector, including contributing to reforms of liquor licensing in the late 1980s that expanded the ability of small eateries to serve alcohol.
