= Lit Espresso Bar =

Café in Toronto, Canada

Lit Espresso Bar is a Toronto based cafe that was founded in 2008, by Joe Angellotti. The business started out with one cafe located in the neighborhood retreat of Roncesvalles Avenue. His sister Nicole Angellotti joined her brother when the college and Ossington location was created soon after the first location met success. Joe has recently moved on to start his new venture, Pig Iron Roasters, which is the roaster who supplies all of the Lit Espresso Bar Cafes.

Lit is also a big part of the speciality coffee community in Toronto as Nicole sits on the planning committee for the Central Canadian Barista Competition. They also run espresso classes for anyone interested and compete in the Brewers Cup, Tasters Cup, and National Barista Competitions.

In April 2013, Joshua Tarlo, resident barista and head of quality control from Lit Espresso Bar (810 College St. & 221 Roncesvalles Ave.) took the title of Canada's top coffee brewer at the Canadians Brewers Cup in Ottawa, Ontario. Tarlo will represent Canada at the World Brewers Cup in Melbourne, Australia from May 23 to 26, 2013. Tarlo was crowned using Kemgin beans grown in Oromia, Ethiopia, and roasted at Pig Iron Coffee Roasters in Mississauga, Ontario. Joshua Tarlo placed in third at the World Brewer's Cup in May 2013.
