= St Ali =

Australian coffee roaster and café group

ST. ALi
- Type: Private
- Founded: 2005
- Headquarters: Melbourne, Australia
- Website: https://stali.com.au

ST. ALi is an independent specialty coffee roaster, retailer and group of cafés founded and based in Melbourne, Australia in 2005. As of October 2009, ST. ALi was credited with being a contributor to the third wave of coffee movement in Melbourne.

Lachlan Ward is the current CEO of ST. ALi, having succeeded long-standing CEO Salvatore Malatesta in 2022. Ward was previously a barista and later manager of ST. ALi. Ward is currently leading ST. ALi's retail expansion into Southeast Asia.

ST. ALi roasts all coffee in-house at its Port Melbourne roastery. The company is privately held, owned by employees within the ST. ALi family. For example, Lucy Ward, the sole green coffee bean buyer for ST. ALi, is a shareholder.

== History ==
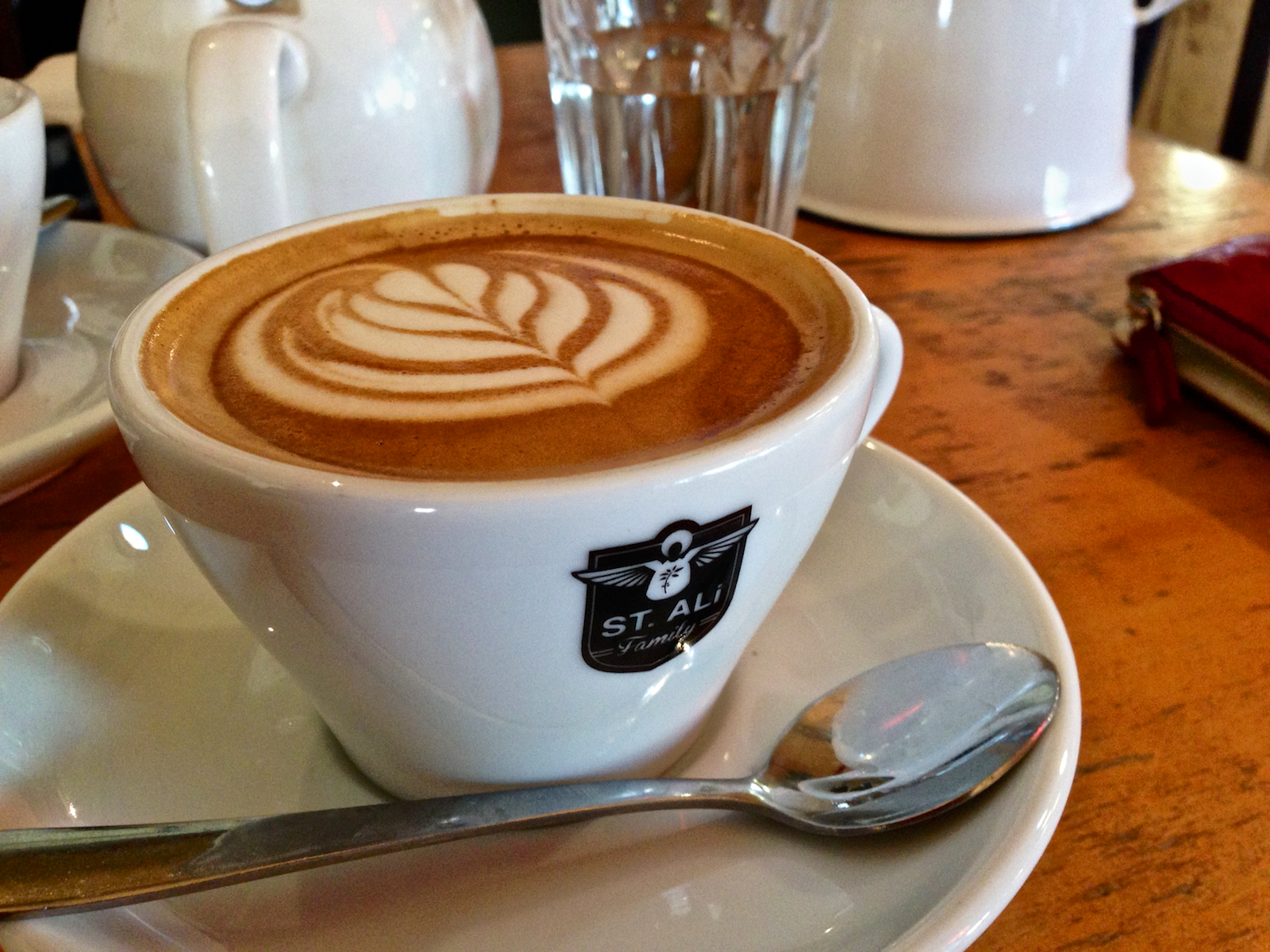
A magic (coffee) served at St Ali, South Melbourne in 2013

ST. ALi derives its name from Ali ibn Umar al-Shadhili, a 14th-century Sufi cleric who introduced coffee to Yemen.

ST. ALi's South Melbourne café was founded in 2005 by Mark Dundon. It was bought by Salvatore Malatesta in 2008. A second café, St Ali North, opened in December 2012.

From January to September 2014, ST. ALi operated a pop-up location on Collins Street, Melbourne alongside other restaurants.

In February 2014, ST. ALi set up a pop-up café and coffee masterclasses at Coffee Workers in Seoul, Korea. Also that year, ST. ALi ran a pop-up café at the London Coffee Festival. This was followed by a café installation in Milan at the design festival Ventura Lambrate as part of an Australian design contingent called ‘The Other Hemisphere'.

ST. ALi established a pop-up café in Jakarta, Indonesia in September 2014. A permanent Jakarta location was opened in 2015.

In November 2016, ST. ALi purchased North Melbourne café Auction Rooms from its founder Andrew Kelly.

In November 2017, ST. ALi partnered with Mercedes-Benz to open 'Mercedes me' at the Rialto Towers, joining six other concept stores in Tokyo, Hong Kong, Moscow, Beijing, Hamburg and Munich. ST. ALi and Mercedes-Benz engineers collaborated to develop a custom coffee roaster for the store. In March 2019, Mercedes me Melbourne hosted Melbourne Design Week events.

ST. ALi opened its first Melbourne Airport venue in April 2019 at Terminal 2 (International Departures).

In September 2020, ST. ALi partnered with Palace Cinemas to become the new Principal Partner of the Italian Film Festival.

In January 2022, ST. ALi offered two free rapid antigen tests for COVID-19 with orders over $159.99 as part of a promotional offer during shortages of the tests in Melbourne. The company apologised after backlash.

In March 2022, ST. ALi was announced as the official Coffee Partner of the Australian Grand Prix.

In April 2023, ST. ALi partnered with Formula One racing driver Valtteri Bottas and Finnish Kahiwa Coffee Roasters, of which Bottas owns 20%, to release a dedicated tote bag and coffee blend called the 'Mullet' for the 2023 Australian Grand Prix.

ST. ALi's second Melbourne Airport venue, ST. ALi Kiosk, opened at the Qantas domestic departures terminal in 2023.

In 2023, ST. ALi also opened 'St Ali & the Queen' at Queen Victoria Market, with a cocktail menu designed by World Bartender of the Year 2022 winner, Orlando Marzo.

ST. ALi opened its second Indonesian location in 2024 at the FURTHER HOTEL in Pererenan (Canggu, Bali).

In October 2024, ST. ALi entered the Philippines with its first branch at the OPUS Mall in Bridgetowne Estate, Quezon City. A flagship store in Bonifacio Global City (BGC) was then opened in October 2025, featuring an omakase-style coffee experience.

In 2025, ST. ALi released a limited-edition coffee blend, in collaboration with Porsche. The small-batch roast was released alongside a customised La Marzocco machine and Martini Racing merchandise.

In April 2026, ST. ALi was announced as the Official Coffee Supplier for the Australian Commonwealth Games Team. The partnership facilitated a dedicated café at the Australian HQ during the 2026 Commonwealth Games in Glasgow.

In August 2026, ST. ALi collaborated with Star Wars to launch a limited-edition coffee collection for Father's Day, releasing two distinct coffee blends featuring the father-son dynamic between Darth Vader and Luke Skywalker.

== Philosophy and sourcing ==
ST. ALi coffee beans are sourced through direct trade with the coffee growers themselves. ST. ALi's coffee beans are all purchased green, and small batch roasted in Melbourne using Brambati roasters.

As well as engaging in direct trade coffee sourcing, ST. ALi is a supporter of local and community initiatives, including a barista challenge run in conjunction with Melbourne City Mission, to teach disadvantaged youth work experience and barista training.

== Recognition ==
ST. ALi has been nationally and internationally recognised for the quality of its coffee and locally for its food. ST. ALi South was awarded "Best Food Cafe" in Melbourne in 2013 by The Age Good Cafe Guide. In 2016, ST. ALi won the People's Choice Award at the Time Out Food Awards for Best Takeaway Coffee in Melbourne.

ST. ALi's head of coffee, Matthew Perger, won first place at the 2012 World Brewers Cup, and has won two Australasian Specialty Coffee Association (AASCA) Detpak Australian Barista Championship titles, and also placed third at the 2011 World Barista Championship that took place in Colombia and the second place in 2013 World Barista Championship.

Representing ST. ALi, senior barista Ben Morrow won the 2016 Coffee Masters tournament for the second time at the London Coffee Festival. Earlier that year, Morrow placed sixth in the World Latte Art Championship finals in Shanghai.

Shinsaku Fukayama of ST. ALi place runner-up in both the 2016 and 2017 Australian Specialty Coffee Association (ASCA) Southern Region Latte Art and Australian Latte Art Championships, before winning both titles in 2018. Fukayama then went on to represent Australia in the 2018 World Latte Art Championships, placing fourth.

ST. ALi warehouse dispatch manager, Jae Kim, won the 2022 ASCA Southern Region Latte Art Championship and placed second in the ASCA Cup Tasters competition.

In 2026, ST. ALi's green bean buyer, Lucy Ward, was awarded a Lifetime Achievement Award at the Melbourne International Coffee Expo (MICE) for her long-standing contributions to the industry and coffee community.
