= Magic (coffee) =

Drink of ristretto coffee with steamed milk

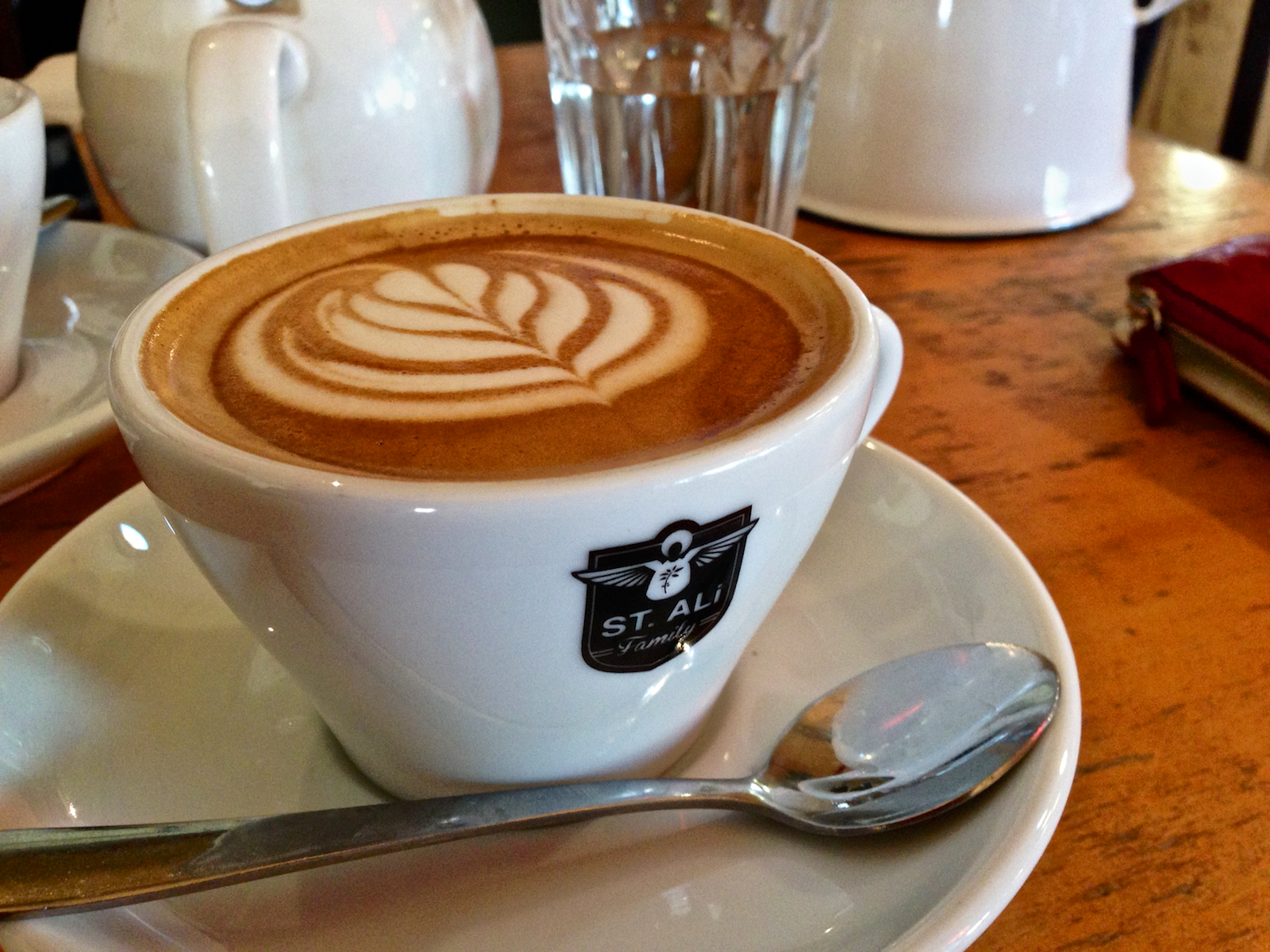
A magic at St Ali South Melbourne in 2013

A magic is a coffee drink made with steamed milk and a double ristretto—a shot of espresso pulled early—that is associated with the Australian city of Melbourne. It is served in a 120 to 150 mL (4.1 to 5.1 US fl oz) cup, around three-quarters the size of a flat white or latte. Writing in 2014, the food journalist Matt Holden described the magic as "a little less milky, a little more coffee-ish than a latte". According to Holden, the magic is what New Zealanders know as a particular preparation of the flat white. (Note: According to Holden, some preparations use espresso shots rather than ristretto)

According to the Melbourne newspaper The Age, the magic was invented in Melbourne in the 2000s. Different accounts credit the drink's creation to several Melbourne cafés: the South Melbourne café branch in the St Ali group; Cafe Ray's in Brunswick, and Newtown S.C. on Brunswick Street in Fitzroy.

An elaborate description of the Newtown S.C. account was recorded in The Age, describing Melbourne lawyer Zenon Misko's claim to the drink's origin. In Misko's telling, the magic was created when he asked the café owner, Cate Della Bosca, to modify his regular order—a double ristretto that he combined with a flat white. By reducing the quantity of flat white, the resulting drink contained a layer of foam the entire way through, without liquid separated out at the bottom. In a 2022 interview, Misko hedged his claim by saying that "if someone else claims to have invented it earlier, great".

By the early 2020s, the magic was an off-menu item in Melbourne cafés. Awareness in the city ranged from people being totally unaware of it, to regarding it as long-established and no longer novel. In other Australian cities, few people were aware of it. According to one café owner interviewed in inner-city Melbourne, ordering a magic had become more frequent in recent years, growing from "a barista-only coffee" in the mid-to-late 2010s. Outside of Australia, newspapers reported the drink was being served in Britain across 330 Marks & Spencer stores from 2023, and in cafés in Indonesia as of 2025.

== See also ==
- Coffee culture in Australia
- List of coffee drinks
- Mont Blanc (coffee)
