= Montblanc =

Montblanc may refer to:

- Montblanc, Hérault, a commune of the Hérault département, in France
- Montblanc, Tarragona, a municipality in the province of Tarragona, Catalonia, Spain
- Montblanc (company), a German manufacturer of writing instruments, watches and accessories
- Montblanc (Final Fantasy), a moogle in Final Fantasy Tactics Advance, Final Fantasy Tactics Advance A2, and Final Fantasy XII
- Montblanc Cricket, a character from One Piece

== See also ==
- Monblanc, a commune of the Gers département, in the region of Occitanie in France
- Mont Blanc (disambiguation)
