= Mont Blanc (disambiguation) =

Mont Blanc is the highest mountain in the Alps.

Mont Blanc may refer to:

== Locations ==
- Mountains in the Alps
  - Mont Blanc massif
  - Mont Blanc de Courmayeur, in the Italian part of the Mont Blanc massif, is the second-highest peak in the Alps
  - Mont Blanc de Cheilon, a mountain in the Pennine Alps in Switzerland
- Mont Blanc Tunnel, a tunnel beneath the Mont Blanc mountain
- Pont du Mont-Blanc, a bridge in Geneva
- Mont Blanc (Moon), the lunar mountain
- Mont-Blanc, Quebec, a municipality in the Laurentides region of Quebec, Canada
- Chamonix-Mont Blanc, a commune in France

== Ships ==
- SS Mont-Blanc, a World War I era French munition ship involved in the Halifax Explosion
- French ship Mont-Blanc (1793), of the French Navy

== Other uses ==
- Mont Blanc (coffee)
- Mont Blanc (dessert)
- Mont-Blanc (department) is a former département of the First French Empire
- Mont Blanc (poem) is the title of an 1816 poem by Percy Bysshe Shelley
- Mont Blanc Restaurant is a former restaurant in London
- TV8 Mont-Blanc, a Savoie-based television channel
- An older name for Montblanc (company), a German manufacturer of luxury pens, watches, and accessories
- Mont Blanc (film), Estonian 2001 animated film

== See also ==
- Montblanc (disambiguation)
