= Mont Blanc (coffee) =

Coffee drink

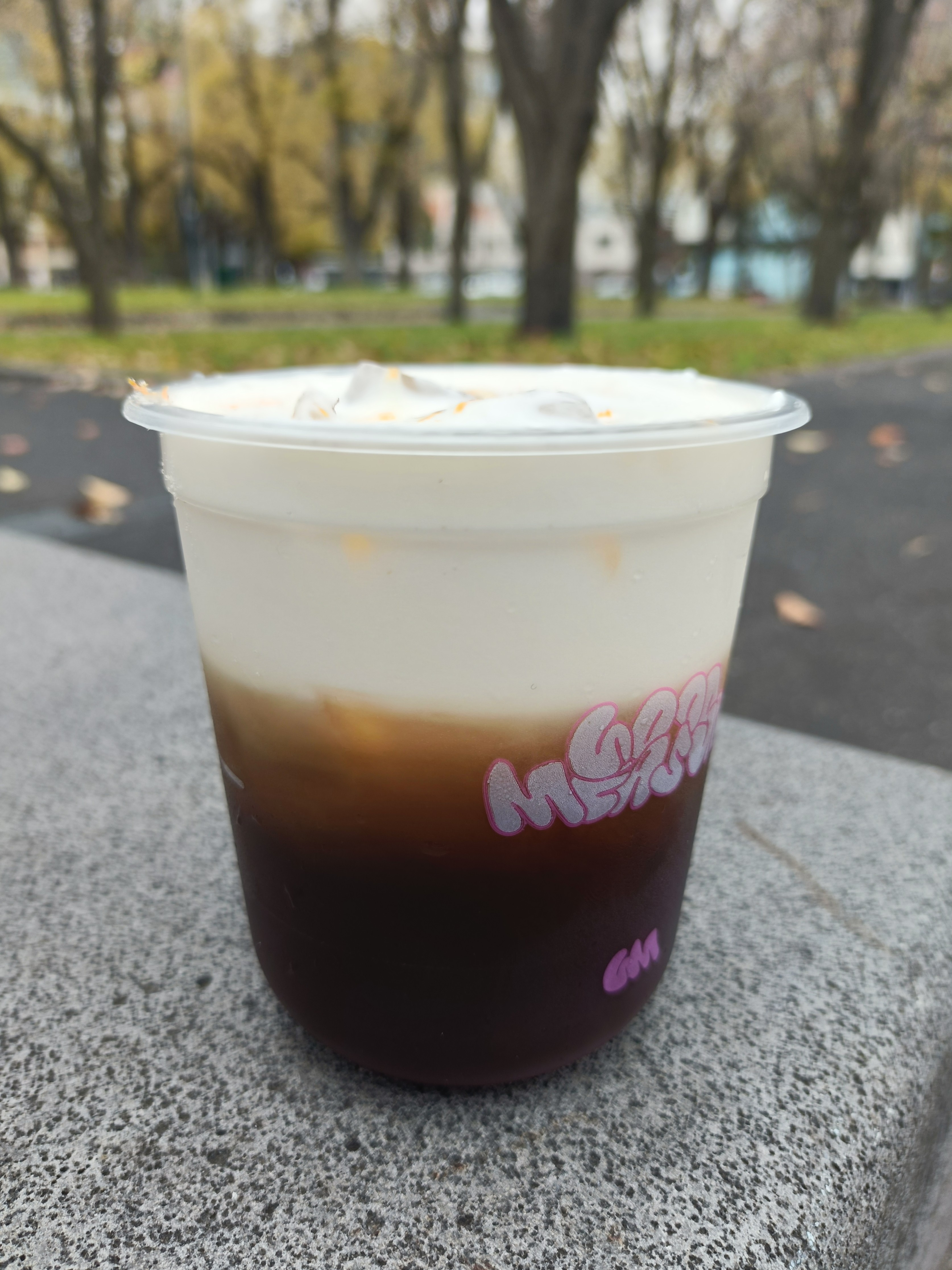
- Mont Blanc from Good Measure, takeaway
- Type: Coffee drink
- Place of origin: Good Measure
- Region or state: Melbourne, Australia
- Associated cuisine: Coffee culture in Australia
- Invented: 2021

Mont Blanc is a chilled beverage in two layers: sweetened cold brew coffee or drip coffee at the bottom, topped with a cap of cream foam with a grated nutmeg and orange zest garnish. It was first sold in late 2021 at the Melbourne bar and café Good Measure, and gained prominence the following year after videos were shared widely on TikTok. The Mont Blanc has spread to cafés in countries including Indonesia, Japan and the United Kingdom, many serving their own versions.

== Description ==
Mont Blanc is a chilled beverage in two layers: sweetened cold brew coffee or drip coffee at the bottom, topped with a cap of cream foam. (Note: In at least one source identified as black sugar syrup.) As originally intended, it is sipped and not stirred, with the coffee drunk through the foam. On the top of Mont Blanc, grated nutmeg and orange zest are included as a garnish. In variations, cafés may flavour the cream foam with ingredients such as a mixture of salt and maple syrup, oleo saccharum made from orange peel, or pistachio. Topping variations include pistachios, and orange zest with flake salt or chai dust.

== History ==
The Mont Blanc was first sold in October 2021 at the Melbourne bar and café Good Measure. In The Age, Mont Blancs were reported as being inspired by Irish coffees, while ABC News quoted Brandon Jo, a co-founder of Good Measure, saying he was inspired by a filter coffee with cream top he saw on a trip to South Korea, and developing a version for their café with his business partner.

In early 2022, content featuring the drink became popular on TikTok, which highlighted the colour-contrast between layers. By 2023, the owners reported selling 2000 Mont Blancs a week, going up to 6500 three years later, to make up almost half of sales. The highest sales, they reported, came on weekends and in the summer months. Content relating to the drink remained popular online, with newspapers variously describing the drink as "viral" and "internet famous". Versions of the drink were prepared across Australia, as well as in countries including Japan, Indonesia, India, and the United Kingdom.

Good Measure, interior and exterior
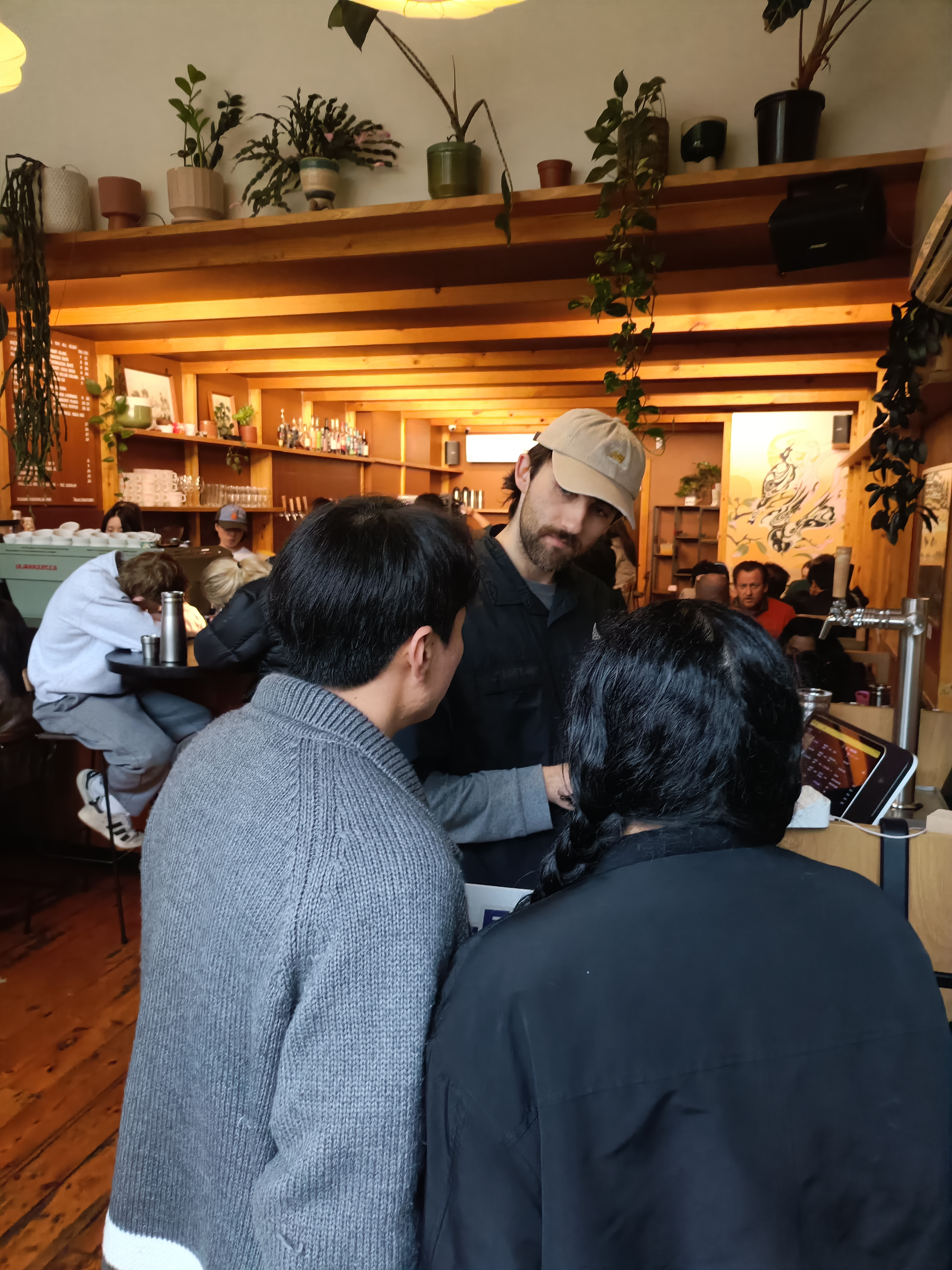
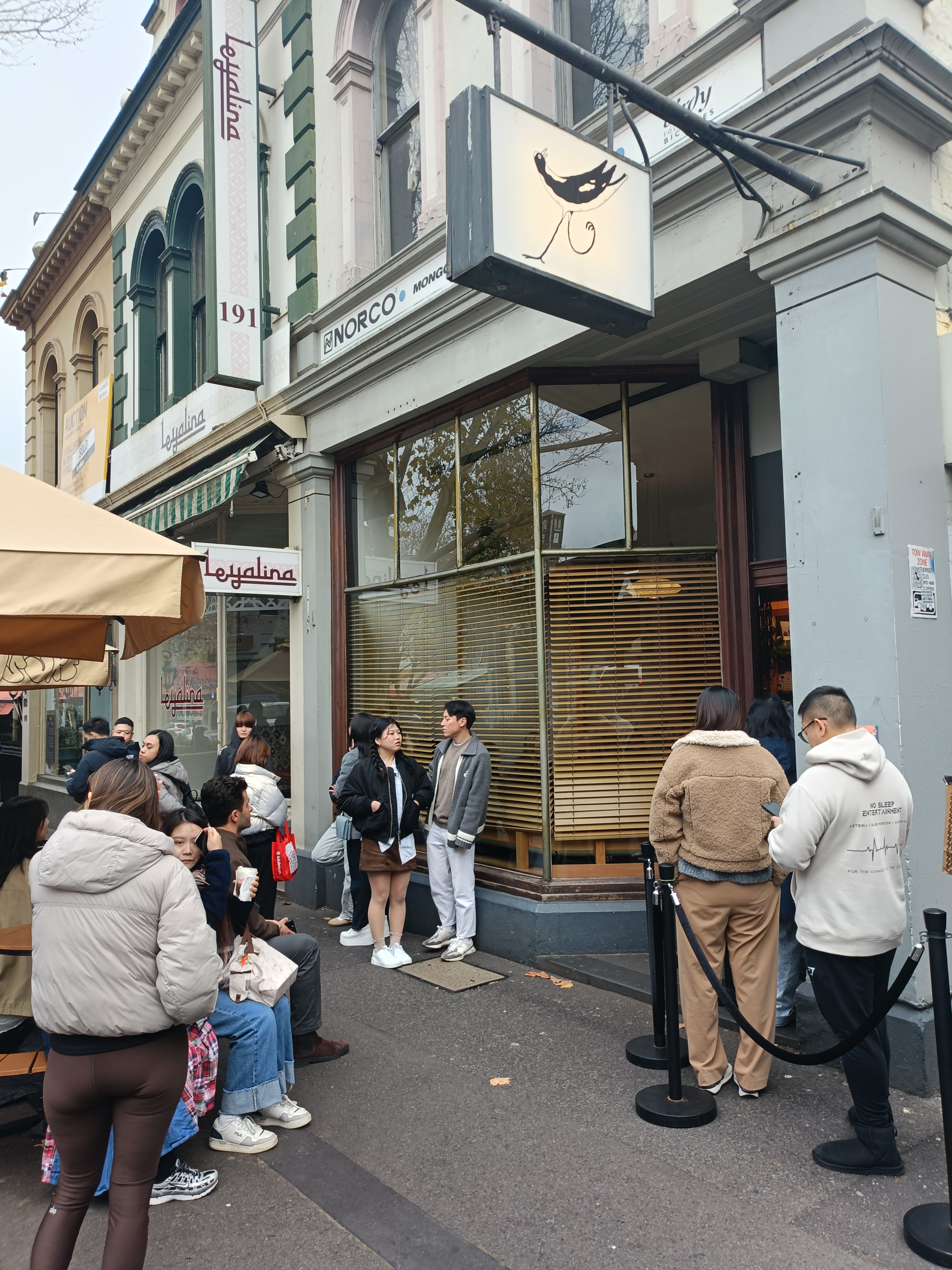

As of 2026, regular portions sold for A$9 at Good Measure and large portions for A$12. This was far more than what coffees typically sold for in Australia, where competition and consumer expectations had kept coffee drinks cheaper than in the US and UK, even as the prices of inputs had gone up. To Good Measure, the ability to charge more for a novelty drink was part of the appeal of creating the Mont Blanc. It was an early example in a wave of Melbourne cafés creating novelty drinks. In doing so, café owners sought to distinguish themselves from their competition, gain traction on social media, and appeal to customers who were unwilling to make large purchases but still sought experiences that felt luxurious.

== See also ==
- Coffee culture in Australia
- List of coffee drinks
  - Magic (coffee)
