= Pellegrini's Espresso Bar =

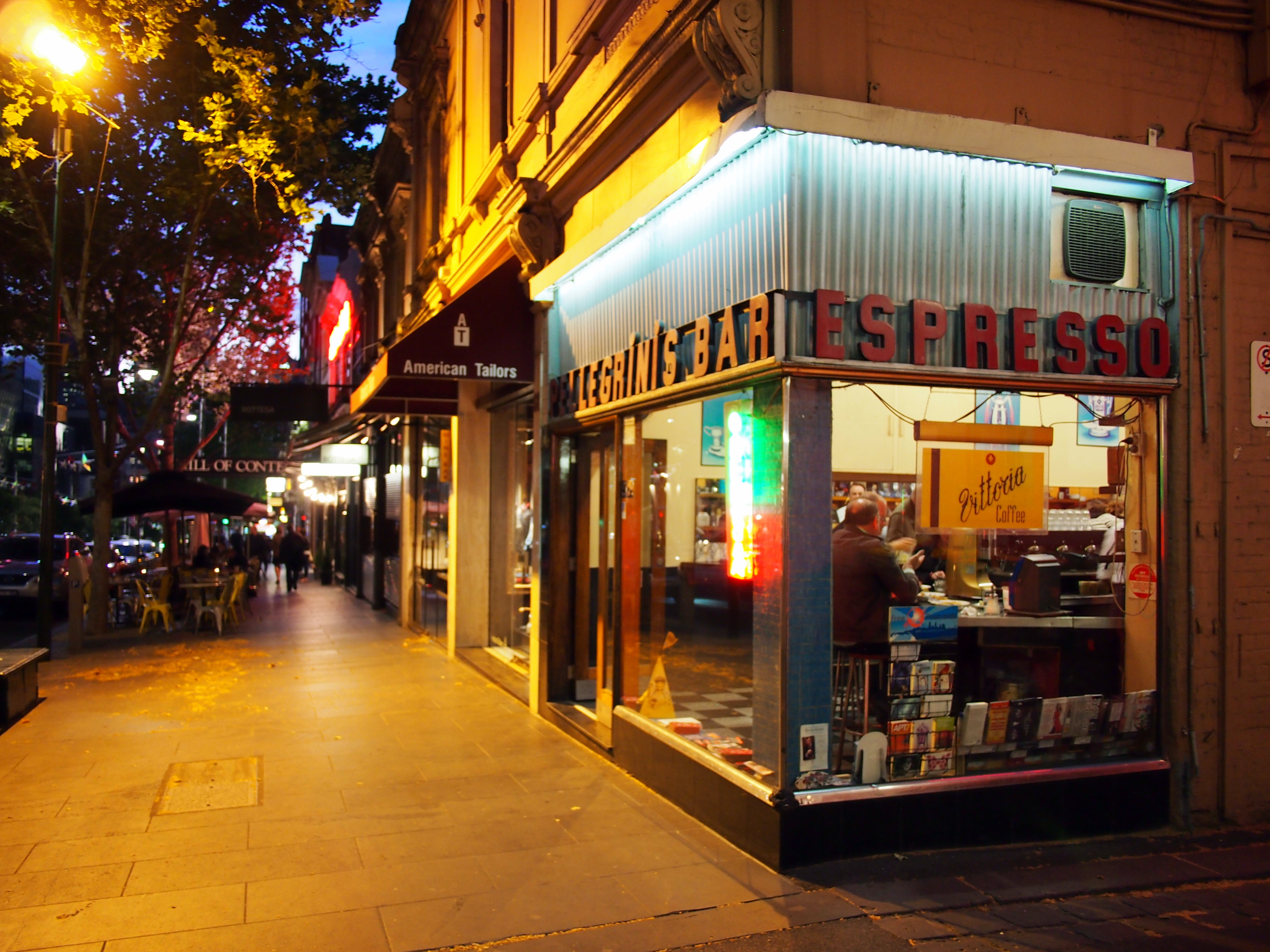
- Interactive map of Pellegrini's Espresso Bar

Restaurant information
- Established: 1954
- Owners: David & Vicki Malaspina
- Previous owners: Sisto Malaspina and Nino Pangrazio; Leo and Vildo Pellegrini
- Food type: Italian
- Location: 66 Bourke Street, Melbourne, 3000, Australia
- Coordinates: 37°48′42.2″S 144°58′16.3″E
- Website: Instagram page

Pellegrini’s Espresso Bar is a café on Bourke Street in Melbourne, Australia. Established in 1954 by brothers Leo and Vildo Pellegrini, Italian migrants who had worked at Florentino's, an Italian restaurant also on Bourke Street. Pellegrini’s was among the first cafés in Melbourne to use an authentic Italian espresso machine, helping to kickstart the city’s emerging coffee culture. While many Italian-Australian cafés in Lygon Street, Carlton, acquired espresso machines at the same time, Pellegrini’s was one of the earliest to bring espresso to the city centre. In 2014, Pellegrini’s was listed by the National Trust of Australia.

Originally a small venue, the café expanded in 1958. Its heritage-listed curved neon Espresso Bar sign, once pointing towards a now-closed rear area on Crossley Street, remains a defining feature. In its early years, the café was a hub for Melbourne’s Italian migrant community before attracting a broader crowd, theatre-goers, taxi drivers, intellectuals, and eventually tourists. The building has retained its 1950s decor and ambience with mirrored walls, red vinyl stools, a long marble counter, and classic service style that has changed little over several decades.

In 1974, the Pellegrini brothers sold the café to fellow Italian migrants Nino Pangrazio and Sisto Malaspina, working alongside them for three months to ensure a smooth handover. As Nino later recalled:

“People said it would never be the same without the Pellegrini family running the place, but we had the same mindset as them. We just continued the way they had been.”

Under Pangrazio and Malaspina, Pellegrini’s became even more firmly embedded in Melbourne’s cultural fabric, serving up Italian staples such as spaghetti bolognese, lasagne, ravioli, minestrone, and non-alcoholic watermelon granita drink. Coffee is prepared in the classic Italian style, using the same imported espresso machine that has defined the café since its opening. Tragedy struck in November 2018 when co-owner Sisto Malaspina was killed during the 2018 Melbourne stabbing attack. The event prompted a huge outpouring of grief: flowers, tribute books, and thousands lining the streets for his funeral. Victorian Premier Daniel Andrews described him as a “Victorian icon” and offered a state funeral. In 2020, a memorial table was placed outside the café bearing his portrait and the inscription “Sisto of Pellegrini’s”, alongside a plaque reading in part:

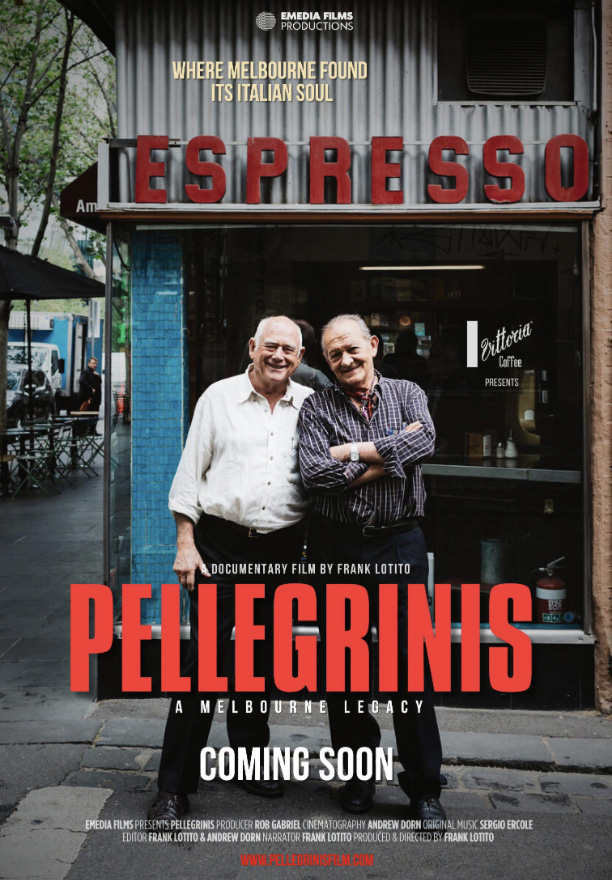
Documentary film poster

“The outpouring of grief that followed Sisto Malaspina’s death… made sense: Sisto loved Melbourne – and Melbourne loved him back.”

That same year, during the COVID-19 pandemic, Sisto’s wife Vicki and son David bought out Pangrazio’s share. David now manages the café, maintaining the traditions his father and the Pellegrini brothers began. In September 2024, long-time staff member Rocco Eliche retired after 50 years of service, marking the end of another chapter in the café’s storied history.

Pellegrini’s Espresso Bar remains at 66 Bourke Street, Melbourne VIC 3000, near the corner of Crossley Street in the theatre district. Open Monday to Thursday from morning until late evening, and slightly later on Fridays and Saturdays, it is closed on Sundays. No bookings are taken. Patrons simply find a seat at the counter and enjoy a coffee or plate of pasta, just as they would have in 1954.

== Documentary film ==
In 2025, a documentary film entitled Pellegrini's: A Melbourne Legacy, directed by Frank Lotito, was released. The film screened in select cinemas across Melbourne as well as in New South Wales, the ACT, Queensland, and South Australia. The film examines the café’s longstanding history, its cultural significance, and the enduring legacy of its esteemed figure, Sisto Malaspina.

== See also ==
- Coffee culture in Australia
