= Flat white =

Drink of espresso coffee with steamed milk

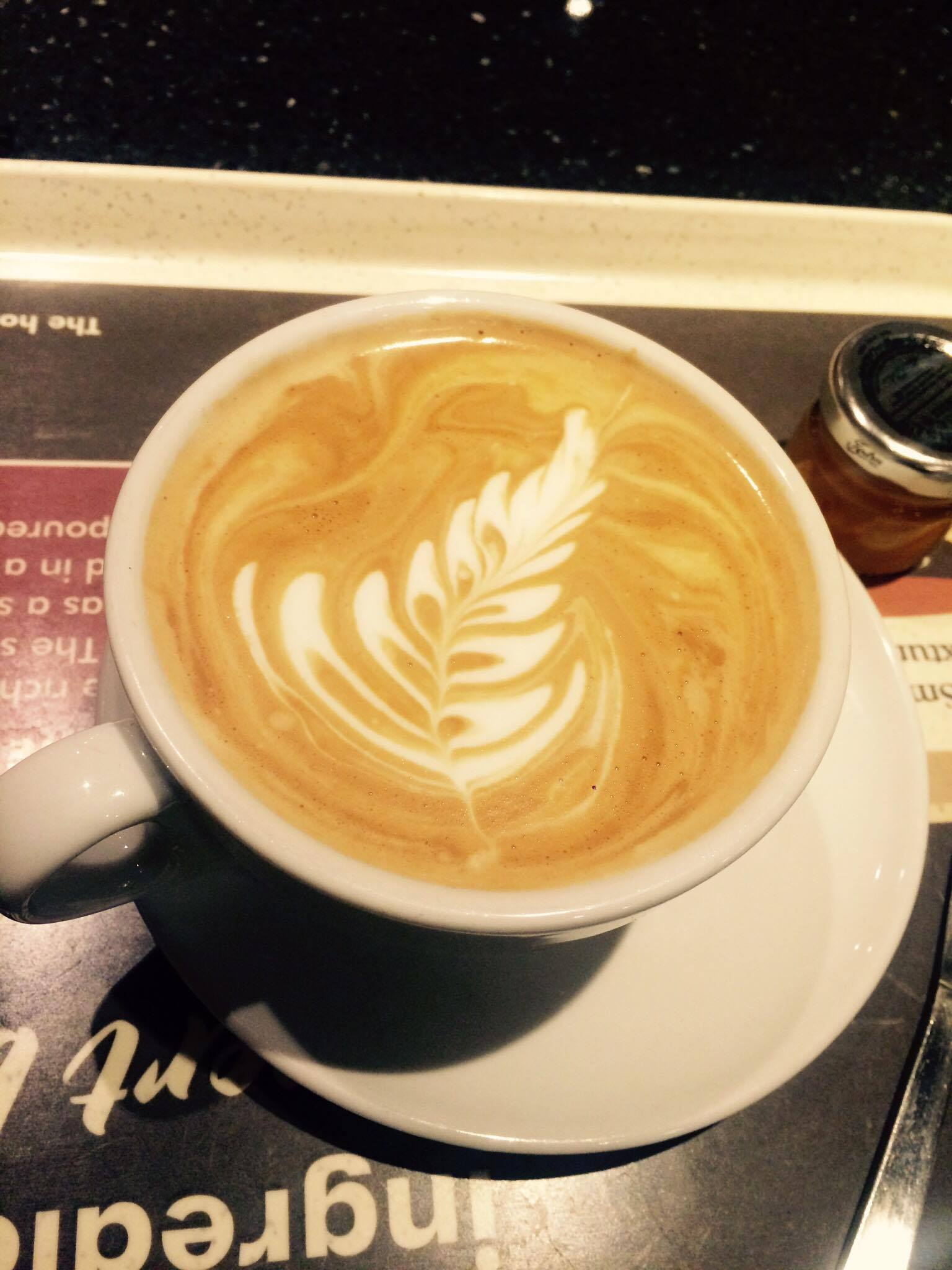
- A flat white with latte art
- Main ingredients: Espresso, steamed milk

A flat white is a drink consisting of espresso coffee and steamed milk. It generally has a higher proportion of espresso to milk than a latte, and does not have the thick layer of foam of a cappuccino. The origin of the flat white is unclear; café owners in both Australia and New Zealand claim its invention. The name, however, was in use in England in the 1960s for an espresso-based coffee.

== Description ==
Anette Moldvaer states that a flat white consists of a double espresso (50 ml; 1.8 imp fl oz; 1.7 US fl oz) and about 130 ml (4.6 imp fl oz; 4.4 US fl oz) of steamed milk with a 5 mm (0.20 in) layer of microfoam. According to a survey of industry commentators, a flat white is a shorter drink with a thin layer of microfoam (hence the 'flat' in flat white), as opposed to the thick layer of foam on the top of a cappuccino. The beverage is often served with a pattern (latte art) on the surface.

The way a flat white is made varies between regions and cafés. In Australia a flat white is usually served in a ceramic cup with a handle, often of a similar volume (200 ml; 7.0 imp fl oz; 6.8 US fl oz) to the glass in which a latte is served, but the flat white usually has less milk and microfoam. According to Tourism New Zealand, flat whites are more commonly served in a smaller cup (175 ml; 6.2 imp fl oz; 5.9 US fl oz). In both Australia and New Zealand, there is a generally accepted difference between lattes and flat whites in the ratio of milk to coffee and the consistency of the milk due to the amount of microfoam produced when the milk is heated.

A true flat white ought to have the same quantity of extracted coffee as any other beverage on the coffee menu (generally 30 ml; 1.1 imp fl oz) but because it is served in a smaller vessel (175 ml; 6.2 imp fl oz) it has stronger flavour than say a latte which is normally served in a 225 ml (7.9 imp fl oz) vessel and is subsequently milkier. The consistency of the milk is another point of difference between a flat white and a latte – a latte has a creamy, velvety layer of milk on the surface which can vary in depth depending on where you buy your coffee. A flat white has a thinner layer of the textured milk, ideally with a shinier surface.

— Tourism New Zealand

== Origins and history ==
Coffee historian Ian Bersten states that, while the origin of the flat white is unclear, the drink probably originated in England in the 1950s. The term is attested in a published source in England in 1971. In the 1963 British film Danger by My Side a character orders a flat white in an espresso bar.

Some commentators trace the flat white to Australia and New Zealand during the 1980s. There is documentary evidence of coffee drinks named "flat white" being served in Australia in the early 1980s. A review of the Sydney café Miller's Treat in May 1983 refers to their "flat white coffee". Another Sydney newspaper article in April 1984 satirised a vogue for caffè latte, stating that, "cafe latte translates as flat white." At Moors Espresso Bar in Sydney, Alan Preston added the beverage to his permanent menu in 1985. Preston claimed he had imported the idea to Sydney from his native far north Queensland. According to historian Dr Garritt Van Dyk, many wealthy Italian cane plantation owners in the area came to enjoy "white coffee: flat" in the cafés' of the 1960s to 1970s, with Preston's café popularising the drink in the southern states. Other documented references include the Parliament House cafeteria in Canberra putting up a sign in January 1985 saying "flat white only" during a seasonal problem with milk cows that prevented the milk frothing. However, the origins of the flat white are contentious, with New Zealand also claiming its invention. One New Zealand claim originates in Auckland, by Derek Townsend and Darrell Ahlers of Cafe DKD, as an alternative to the Italian latte; they recalled learning of the name "flat white" from a friend who had worked in cafes in Sydney. A second New Zealand claim originates from Wellington as a result of a "failed cappuccino" at Bar Bodega on Willis St in 1989. Craig Miller, author of Coffee Houses of Wellington 1939 to 1979, claims to have prepared a drink known as a flat white in Auckland in the mid-1980s, using a recipe from Australia.

== Similar drinks ==
The flat white is similar to a cappuccino, which is a single espresso with heated milk and a layer of thick foam served in a 150–160 ml (5.3–5.6 imp fl oz; 5.1–5.4 US fl oz) cup. The flat white, however, does not have the thick layer of foam, but rather made with only steamed milk containing microfoam.

The flat white is similar to a latte, which is espresso with steamed milk added, served in a glass. A flat white has less milk and less microfoam than a latte.

== Outside Australia and New Zealand ==
While, as documented above, the term was used in England at least as early as 1963, an article in the Daily Telegraph reports that the coffee style had been exported from Australia and New Zealand to the United Kingdom by 2005, and by 2010 was being sold in franchises of the US Starbucks chain there. By 2013 the flat white was available in Australian cafés in New York City, with Hugh Jackman co-owning one of them and endorsing the product. Starbucks introduced the flat white in American stores on 6 January 2015. In 2024, the Economist reported that one in three consumers in the UK chose a flat white, with Pret a Manger selling eight million flat whites in the previous year, nearly matching the nine million cappuccinos sold. The popularity of the beverage was also increasing in the United States.

== Related terms ==
In the UK, the phrase "flat white economy" has been used to describe London's network of internet, media and creative businesses, based on Douglas McWilliams' book The Flat White Economy: How the Digital Economy Is Transforming London and Other Cities of the Future, published in 2015, as the coffee is popular with workers in those businesses.

== See also ==
- Coffee culture in Australia
- Milk coffee
- List of coffee drinks
