= Mount White (Colorado) =

Mountain in the state of Colorado

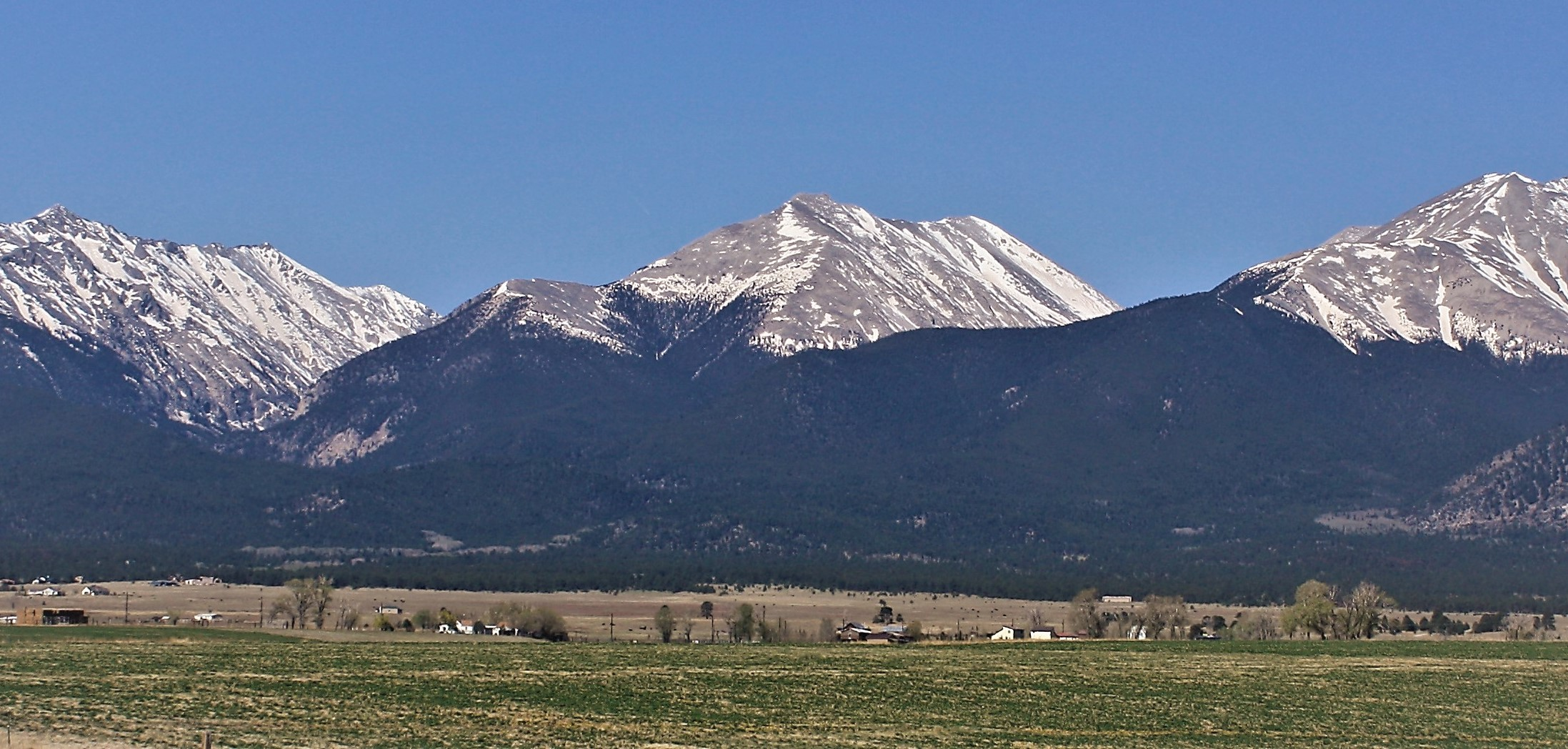
- Northeast aspect, centered, from Highway 285

Highest point
- Elevation: 13,667 ft (4,166 m)
- Prominence: 827 ft (252 m)
- Parent peak: Mount Antero (14,276 ft)
- Isolation: 0.84 mi (1.35 km)
- Coordinates: 38°39′25″N 106°14′15″W

Geography
- Location within Colorado Location within the United States
- Country: United States
- State: Colorado
- County: Chaffee
- Protected area: San Isabel National Forest
- Parent range: Rocky Mountains; Sawatch Range
- Topo map: USGS Mount Antero

Geology
- Rock age: Tertiary
- Rock type(s): Granite, quartz monzonite, andesite

Climbing
- Easiest route: class 2 hiking

Mount White is a 13,667-foot (4,166 m) mountain summit in Chaffee County, Colorado, United States.

== Description ==
Mount White is set 8 miles (13 km) east of the Continental Divide in the Sawatch Range which is a subrange of the Rocky Mountains. The mountain is located 16 miles (26 km) northwest of the community of Salida on land managed by San Isabel National Forest and can be seen from Highway 285. It ranks as the 169th-highest peak in Colorado. Precipitation runoff from the mountain's slopes drains into Browns Creek which is a tributary of the Arkansas River. Topographic relief is significant as the summit rises over 2,450 feet (747 m) above the creek in one mile (1.6 km). Mt. White and nearby Mount Antero are significant sources for aquamarine which is the state gem for Colorado. Topaz is another gemstone that can be found on White's slopes. The mountain's toponym has been officially adopted by the United States Board on Geographic Names.

== Climate ==
According to the Köppen climate classification system, Mt. White is located in an alpine subarctic climate zone with cold, snowy winters, and cool to warm summers. Due to its altitude, it receives precipitation all year, as snow in winter, and as thunderstorms in summer, with a dry period in late spring.

== Gallery ==
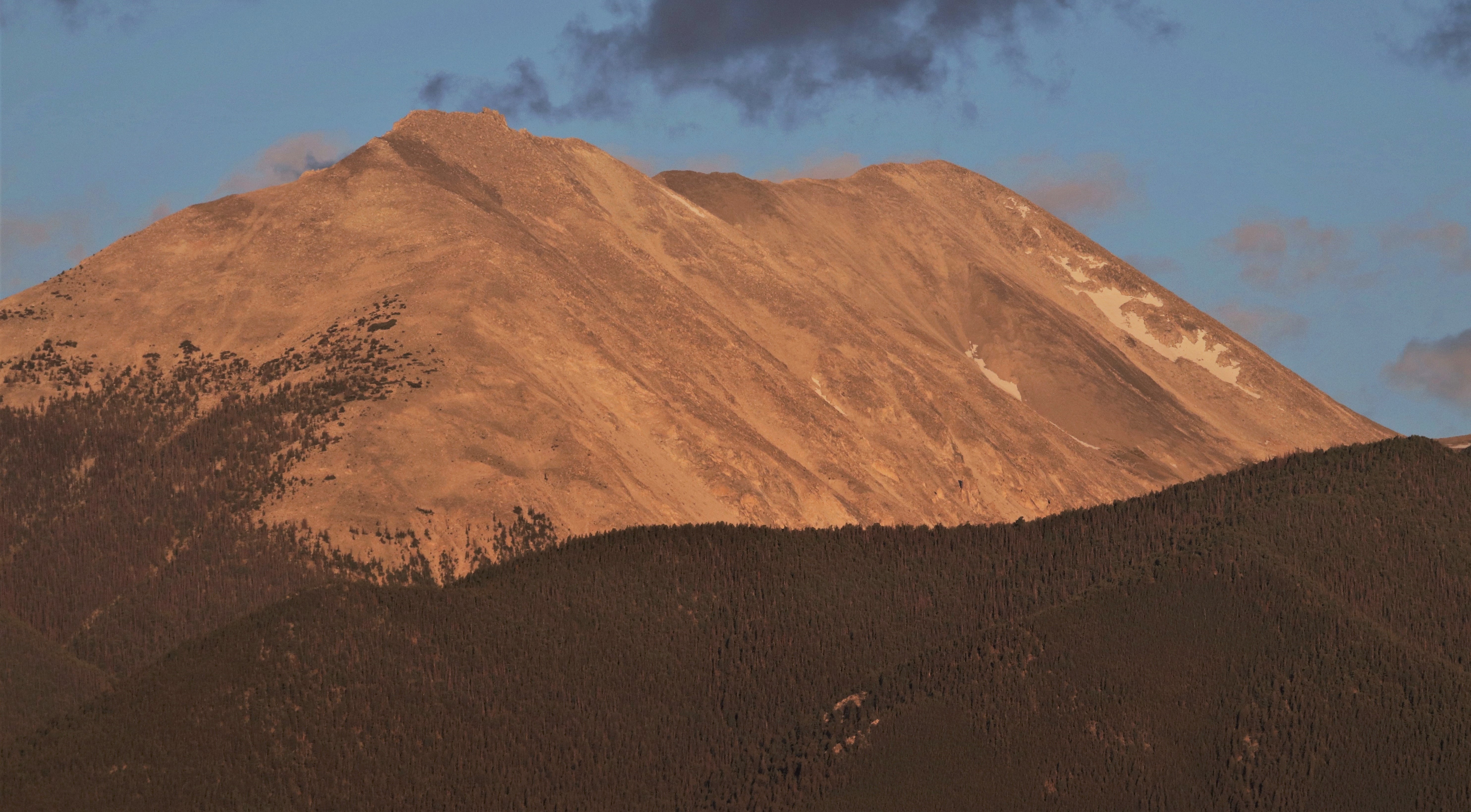
Northeast aspect of Mt. White in the morning light

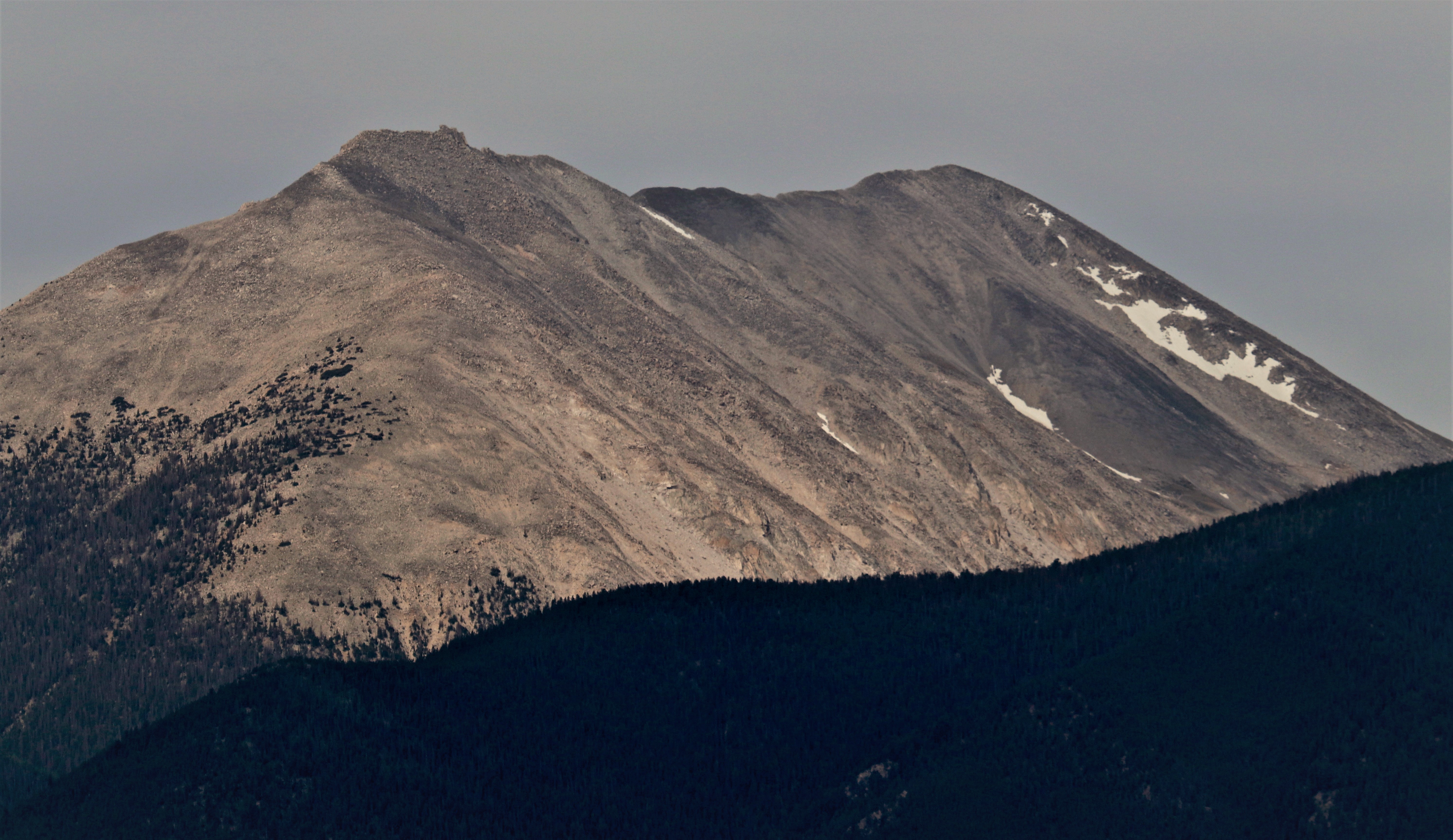
Northeast aspect

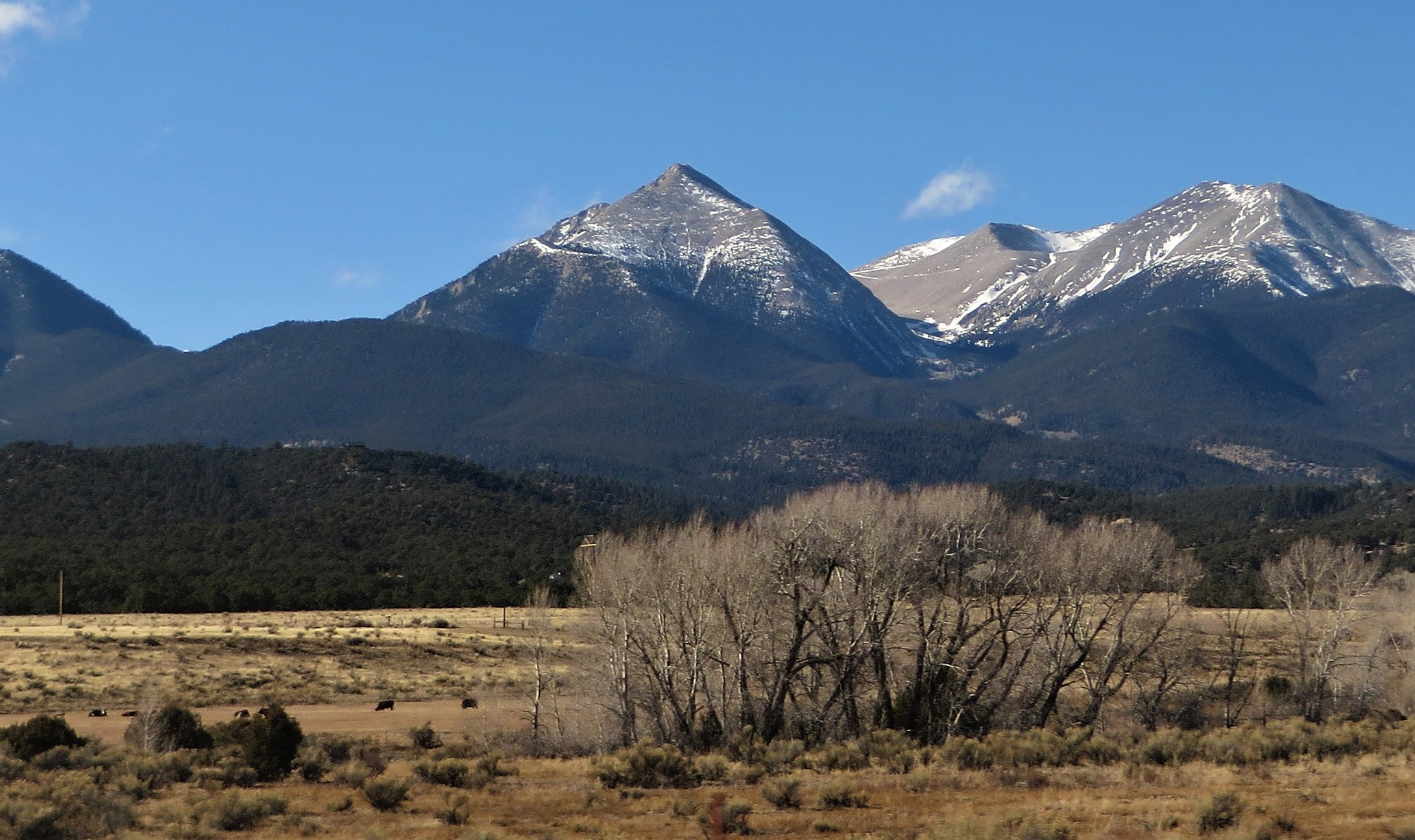
East aspect of Mt. White (center) and Mt. Antero (right) from US Route 285, Colorado

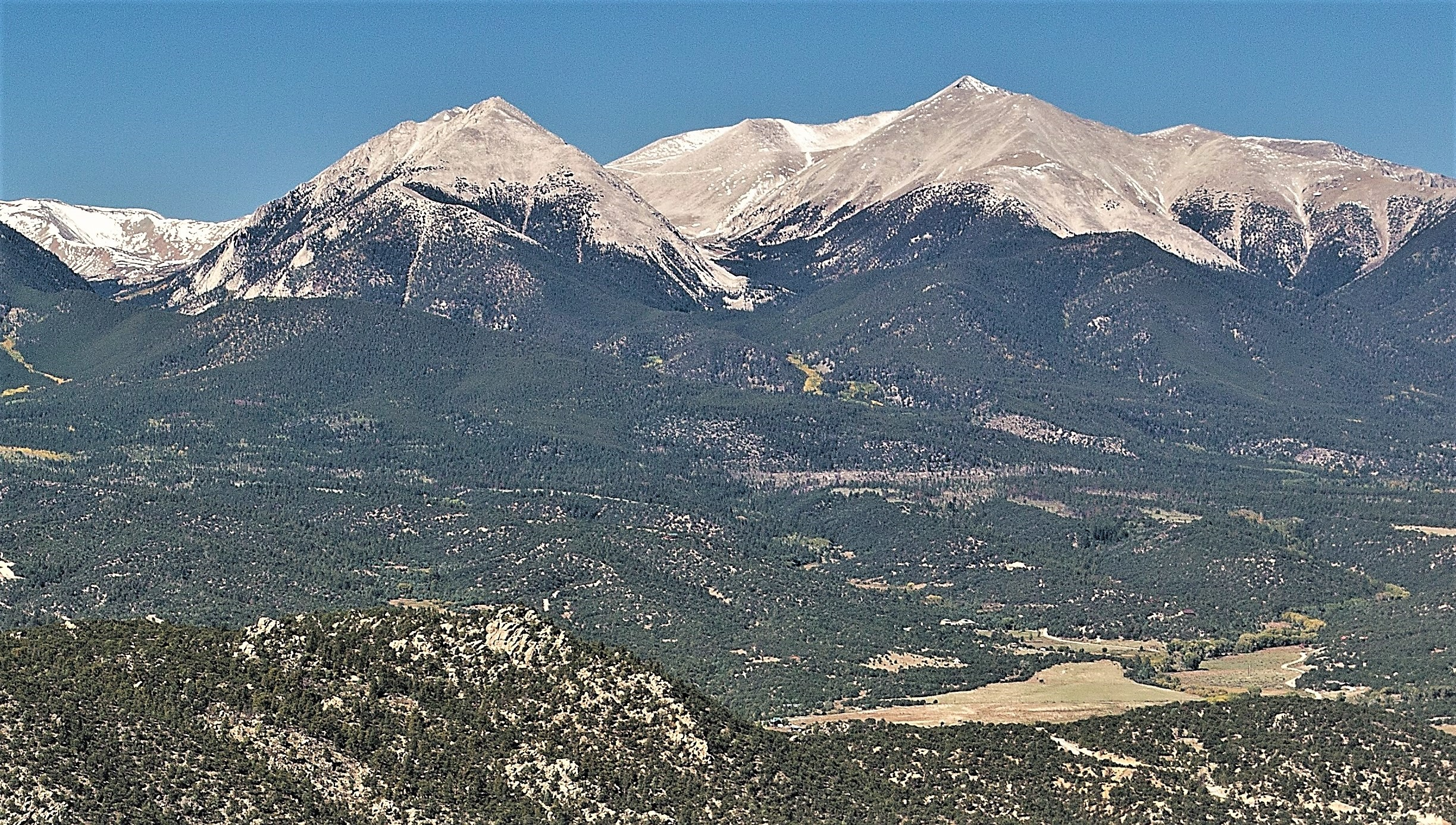
East aspect of Mt. White (left) and Mt. Antero (right)

== See also ==
- List of mountain peaks of Colorado
- Thirteener
