= World Brewers Cup =

Competition of manual coffee brewing

The World Brewers Cup (WBC or WBrC) is an annual international coffee brewing competition organized by World Coffee Events, an organization founded by the Specialty Coffee Association. The stated goal of the competition is to showcase the craft and skill of filter coffee brewing by hand, promoting manual coffee brewing and quality of service. Contestants qualify for the international competition by winning their respective national championships. As of 2019, there were approximately 40 participating national organizations. The annual location of the event is determined by the World Coffee Events organizing committee, and is typically held in conjunction with the World Barista Championship, the World Coffee Roasting Championship, and the World Latte Art Championship. The first World Brewers Cup was held in 2011 in Maastricht, Netherlands. The 2022 WBrC was held in Melbourne, VIC, Australia.

== Format and rules ==
To qualify for the World Brewers Cup, contestants must win their respective national championship organized by affiliated national organizations. The national champion may be substituted by the national organization if they are unable to attend.

The WBrC consists of two rounds: a first round and a finalist round. In the first round, every competitor is required to complete two coffee services: a compulsory service and an open service.

For the compulsory service, competitors prepare three coffee beverages utilizing the same whole bean coffee provided to them by the competition organizers. In the compulsory service, competitors' coffees are evaluated on a standardized numerical scale based on several sensory criteria including aroma, flavor, aftertaste, acidity, body, balance, and overall perception.

For the open service, competitors may utilize any whole bean coffee of their choosing and must also accompany their beverage preparation with a 10-minute presentation. During the open service, the competitor typically explains the origin of the coffee, the brewing method, and tasting notes while brewing at least three beverages, one for each of the three sensory judges. In the open service, both the taste and presentation are scored by the judges. A total dissolved solids (TDS) measurement is also taken for each beverage for reference purposes and to ensure a maximum TDS of less than or equal to 2% (20,000 ppm).

The six competitors with the highest combined score from the first round will go on to compete in the final round consisting exclusively of an open service.

One competitor from the final round with the highest score is named the World Brewers Cup Champion.

== Brewing equipment and techniques ==
Competitors may use any manual (unpowered) brewing device and technique of their choosing. In principle, any manual technique as distinct from "espresso" type extraction is permitted, including methods that use pumping or pressurized extraction so long as it is manually powered. Competitors are mandated to bring their own brewing equipment so long as it meets the criteria of being a manual device. Different devices and methods have been employed by competitors at the WBrC, including French press, pour-over, modified AeroPress and other hybrid techniques. Most competitors employ a pourover technique using commercially available brewers (such as Hario V60 or Kalita Wave) or modified versions. Some competitors have also used custom-designed brewers in competition.

There are no hard limitations on the recipes (coffee to water ratio), which may be varied by the competitor. Any bean (or combination) as well as water source, without additives, can be employed. The limitation on the final brew is only that it must be less than or equal to 2% TDS to distinguish from espresso-type coffee.

== Past winners ==
Year	Location	Winner & Affiliation (Country)	Coffee	Brewer	Grinder	Recipe	Source
2011	Maastricht, Netherlands	Keith O'Sullivan, Independent (Ireland)	Has Bean's Bolivia Finca Bolinda	Chemex			
2012	Vienna, Austria	Matt Perger, St Ali (Australia)	Washed Gesha, Finca Santa Teresa (Panama)	Hario V60			
2013	Melbourne, Australia	James McCarthy, Counter Culture Coffee (United States)	Counter Culture Hacienda Esmeralda Gesha (Panama)	Kalita Wave		24g : 380 mL, high flow for first half and restrict flow for second half, total 3:30	
2014	Rimini, Italy	Stefanos Domatiotis, Taf Coffee (Greece)	Ninety Plus, Gesha (Panama)	Hario V60			
2015	Gothenburg, Sweden	Odd-Steinar Tøllefsen, Supreme Roastworks (Norway)	Ninety Plus, Nekisse (Ethiopia)	Hario V60 (Ceramic)		20g : 300 mL @ 92 °C, 3:30 extraction	
2016	Dublin, Ireland	Tetsu Kasuya, Coffee Factory (Japan)	Ninety Plus, Gesha (Panama)	Hario V60 (Ceramic)		20g : 300 mL @ 92 °C, 3:00 extraction (Kasuya's 4:6 method)	
2017	Budapest, Hungary	Chad Wang, Jascaffe (Taiwan)	Ninety Plus, Gesha (Panama)	Hario V60 (Ceramic)		15g : 250 mL @ 92 °C, 2:00 extraction	
2018	Belo Horizonte, Brazil	Emi Fukahori, MAME (Switzerland)	Daterra Laurina (Brazil)	GINA		17g : 220 mL @80-95 °C, 2:55 extraction (hybrid immersion-pourover method)	
2019	Boston, United States	Du Jianing, Uni-Uni Roasters (China)	Ninety Plus Gesha (Panama)	Origami Dripper		16g : 240 mL @94 °C, 1:40 extraction	
2021	Milan, Italy	Matt Winton (Switzerland)	Natural-process Eugenoides, Finca Inmaculada (Columbia) + Washed Catucai (Ecuador)	Hario V60 (Metal)	Kinu M47	20g : 300 mL @ 93° & 88 °C, 2:40 extraction (over 5 pours)	
2022	Melbourne, Australia	Shih Yuan Hsu (Sherry), Taiwan	Finca Micava, Natural Carbonic Maceration Geisha	Orea Dripper V3 (black) + Kalita 185	1Zpresso K-Pro	14g with 75% ground @ 1000 microns and 25% @ 800 microns : 200 mL @ 70°C (1st pour), 95°C (remaining 3 pours), 4 total pours of 50g every 30 sec.	
2023	Athens, Greece	Carlos Medina, Chile	Cafe Granja La Esperanza, Natural Sidra (Colombia)	Origami Dripper	1Zpresso ZP6 Special 5.2	15.5g : 250 g @ 91°C, 5 total pours of 50g every 30 sec.	
2024	Chicago, U.S.A.	Martin Wölfl, Wildkaffee Austria (Austria⁣)	Gesha by Finca Maya, natural anaerobic processing by Lost Origin Coffee Lab Panama	Orea v4 with fast bottom and Sibarist filter, WDT and Melodrip	Mazzer ZM	17g ground @ 630 microns : 270 g @ 93°C, 60ml bloom, 60ml @ 40s, 50ml @ 1:20, 100ml @ 2:00	
2025	Jakarta, Indonesia	Peng Jinyang, Captain George Coffee Roaster, (China)	GN-06 Mount Totumas, Amaru lot, Natural Geisha (Panama)	SOLO Dripper	FM Grinder 11 clicks	15g:210g (96°C / 80°C), 96°C (30g first pour), 96°C (90g @ 0:30s), 80°C (90g @ 1:10s + Melodrip), 30-90-90 Technique	

== See also ==
- World Barista Championship
