= Coffee in Australia =

Coffee culture and history in Australia

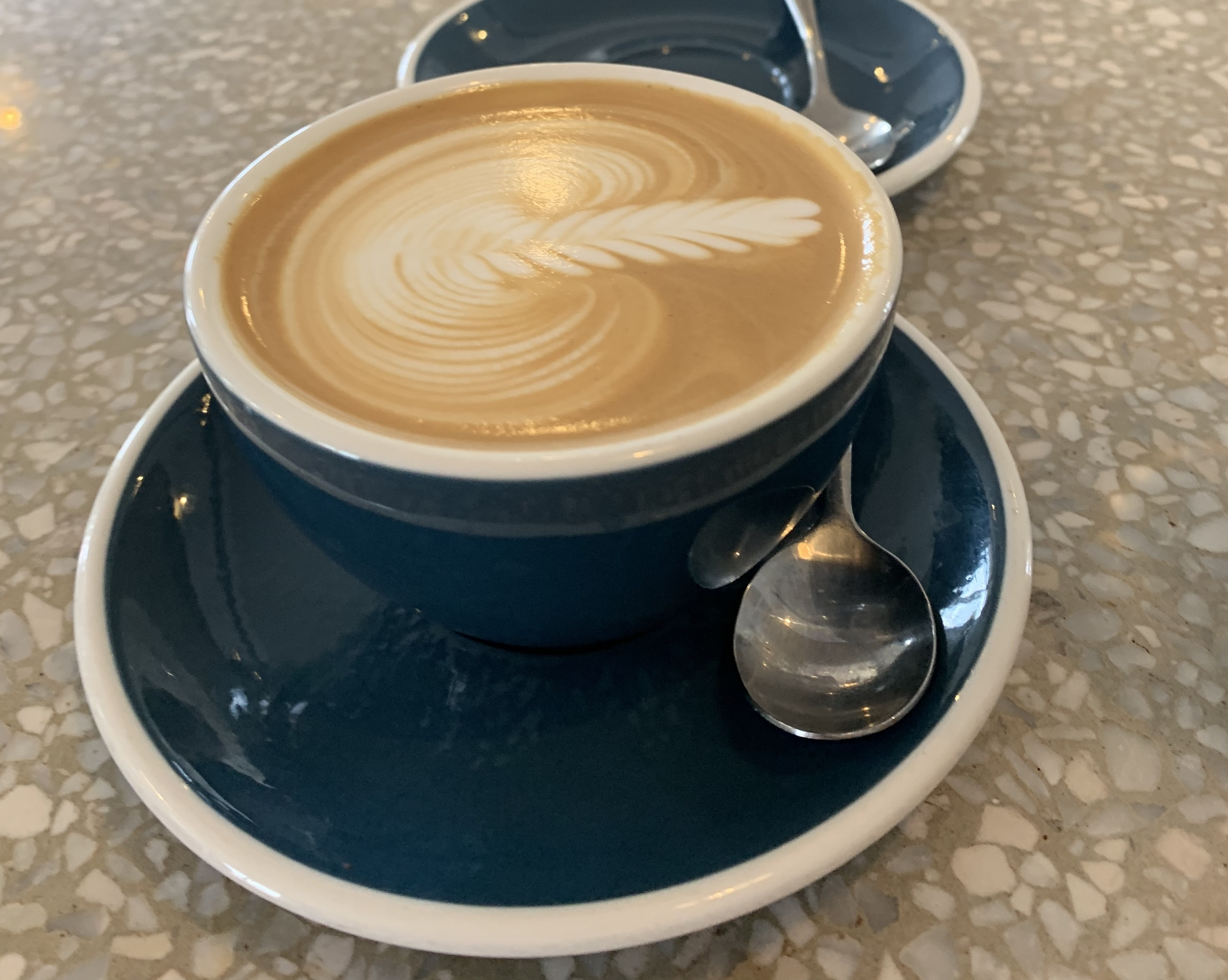
A flat white coffee, a classic Australian coffee

Coffee culture has become a significant cultural phenomenon in Australia.

== History ==
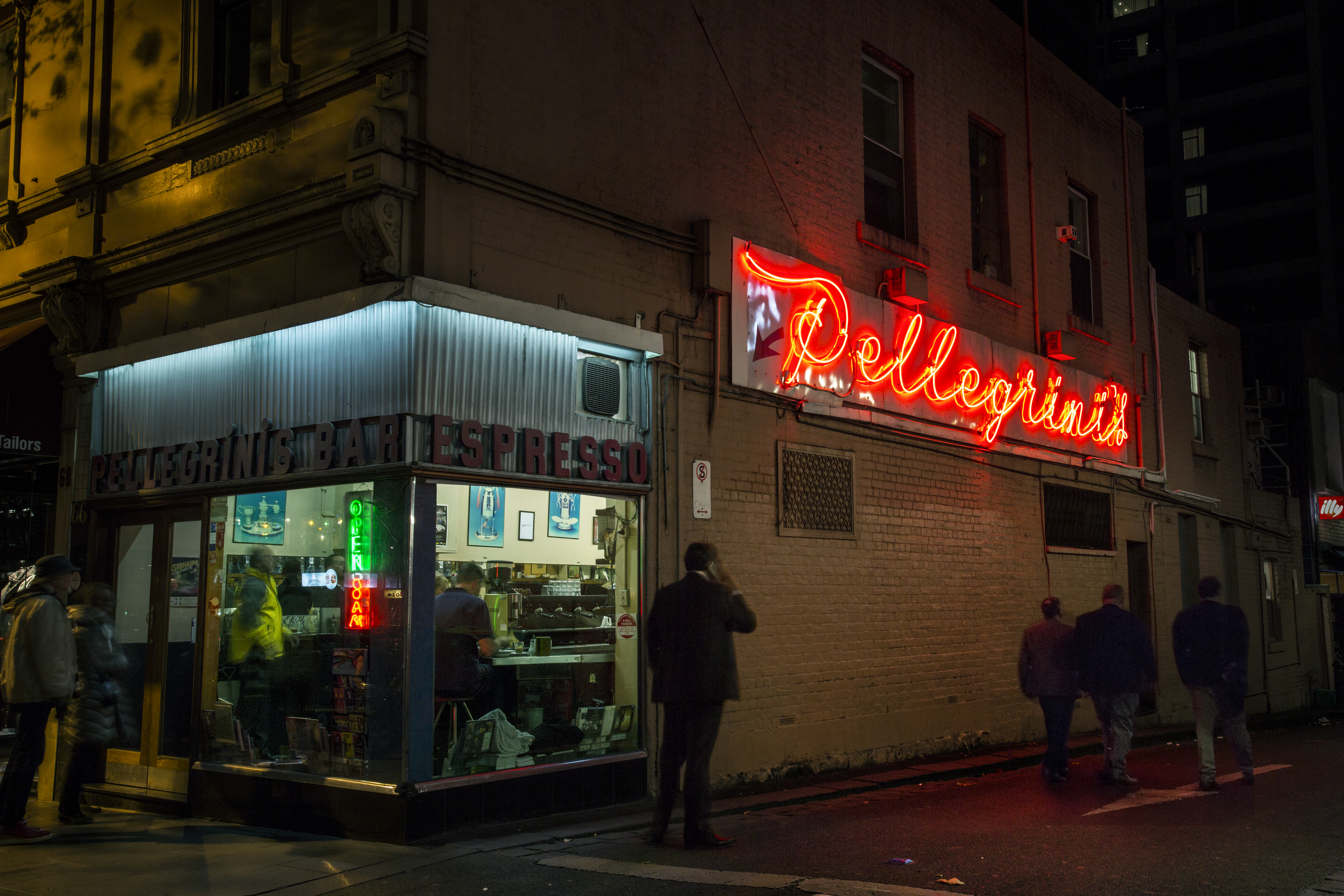
Pellegrini's Espresso Bar in central Melbourne, opened in 1954

=== 19th Century ===
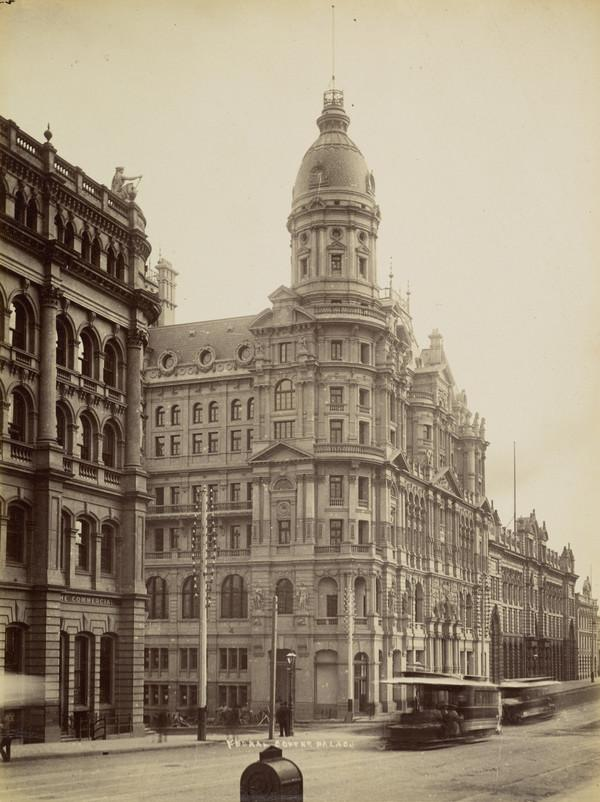
The Federal Coffee Palace in Melbourne, 1890s

According to the National Geographic, coffee and coffee seeds came to Australia on the British First Fleet in 1788. Due to an unfavourable climate, the plants failed to thrive in Sydney. The British colonists were firmly established as tea drinkers, and it was almost a century before coffee became part of Australian culture.

In Melbourne, coffee was being sold as early as 1845 by pioneer grocer Germain Nicholson at his store on the corner of Collins and Swanston Streets. People would gather at the store's window to see and smell the coffee beans being roasted and ground by steam power.

Coffee became increasingly popular in the boom decades following the gold rush, due to the rise of fashionable Parisian style coffee shops and the lobbying of the Temperance Movement, a movement of Christian women who protested anti-social drunken behaviour.

Australia was a predominantly tea-drinking society. In the early-1880s, Australians were, per capita, the largest consumers of tea in the world, reportedly consuming annually 6.61 pounds of tea per head. By the 1880s, Coffee 'palaces' were becoming increasingly common in both Australian cities and larger country towns.

Australia has developed a distinct coffee culture. The coffee industry has grown from independent cafes since the early 20th century.

=== Late 20th Century – Today ===
After the Second World War, Italian immigrants were the first to bring espresso machines to Australia.

Café culture first flourished in Leichhardt, Sydney due to its high concentration of Italian immigrants. Several Italian coffee names were eventually switched, with the caffè lungo the long black and the espresso becoming the short black.

In 1952, the first espresso machines began to appear in Australia, and many fine Italian coffee houses were emerging in Melbourne and Sydney. Pellegrini's Espresso Bar and Legend Café often lay claim to being Melbourne's first "real" espresso bar, opening their doors in 1954 and 1956 respectively. The 1950s also saw the establishment of one of Australia's most high-profile coffee brands, Vittoria, which remains Australia's largest coffee maker and distributor. The brand has existed in Australia since 1958, well before it moved to the United States.

The flat white has been described by The Economist as Australia's greatest culinary export. The flat white is an espresso-based coffee drink that may have emerged in Australia and New Zealand during the 1980s, although its origins are contested. It is an espresso with steamed milk and a thin layer of microfoam. The drink gained popularity in Australia in the late twentieth century before spreading internationally, particularly to the United Kingdom and United States. One origin theory comes from café owner Alan Preston who claims he used the term “flat white” for the menu of Sydney's Moors Espresso Bar in 1985.

In 1993, McCafé was conceptualised and launched in Melbourne, Australia and introduced to the public with help from McDonald's CEO Charlie Bell and then-Chairman and future CEO James Skinner. The chain reflects a consumer trend towards espresso coffees. McCafé outlets generated 15% more revenue than a regular McDonald's and, by 2003, were the largest coffee shop brand in Australia and New Zealand. In 2023, McCafé had over 1,000 locations in Australia.

The McCafé concept was designed to help create atmosphere and foot-traffic at the entrance to the McDonalds stores at Swanston Street, Melbourne, a very large store with the front counter a considerable distance from the shop's entrance. The first McCafé opened as a Corporate store in Melbourne. The first one in the United States opened in Chicago, Illinois, in May 2001, when there were about 300 worldwide.

In May 2003, McCafé launched in the UK, then in 2004 McCafé opened in Costa Rica and in France, and the next year, the concept was launched in Italy. In 2007, the chain expanded to Japan as part of McDonald's efforts to boost sales with healthier soup and sandwich offerings and reach out to new customers who favoured traditional coffee shops. Despite being a relatively small part of McDonald's overall strategy, there were 1,300 worldwide by 2008.

=== Local Taste and Characteristics ===
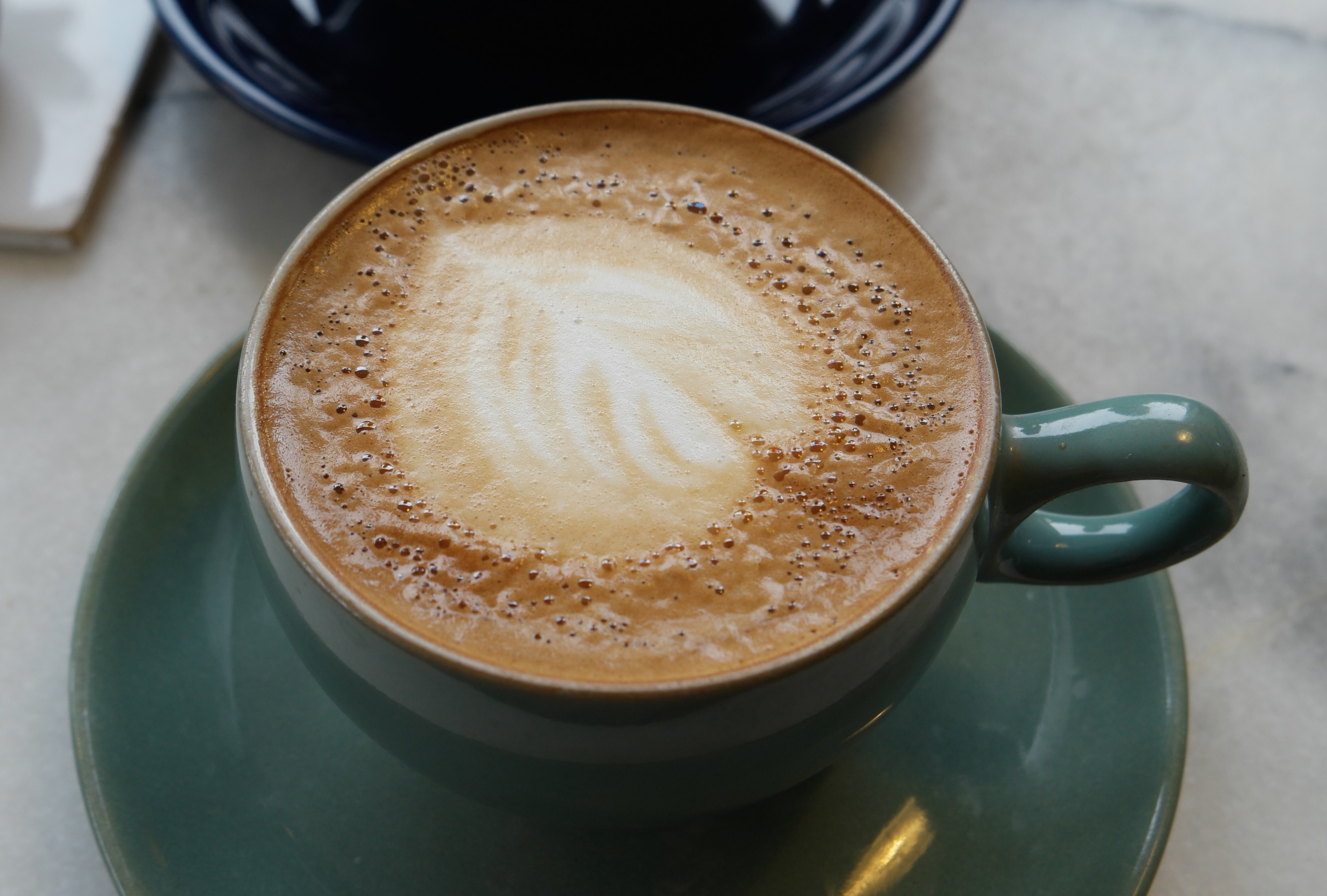
The ubiquitous Australian coffee drink, the flat white

Australians tend to prefer less sugary coffee, opting for pure rather than sugary variants. Australian café culture is said to emphasise the quality of the beverage, in addition to the quality of the coffee making process. Specialty coffee is in demand in Australia, with numerous boutique cafés. Such coffees include innovations in both the roasting and brewing processes.

In 2018, international coffee chain Starbucks had a very low market share in Australia. Australia's long-established independent cafés compete with homegrown franchises such as The Coffee Club, Michel's Patisserie, Dôme in Western Australia, and Zarraffas Coffee in Queensland. One reason for this cultural phenomenon is that unlike the United States and Asia, Australia has for many decades had an established local culture of independent cafés before coffee chains tried to enter the market. Australians are more focused on the specialty coffee culture, focusing on sourcing fresh coffee beans, roasting properly, and brewing the best coffee.

Ristretto is a more concentrated but less extracted espresso, with bolder flavour but also less bitter. The Australian iced coffee does not involve blending, and may incorporate different local flavours, ice creams and syrups. Another uniquely Melbourne coffee style is the "Magic," made with a double ristretto topped with steamed milk, typically served in a 5–6 oz tulip cup.

== Coffee Industry in Australia ==
In 2022, the Australian coffee industry generated US$5.8 billion in revenue.

Australia produces a small volume of specialty coffee, harvesting up to 600 tonnes of green beans from about 850,000 trees every year.

Coffee is grown in two main areas in Australia, northern New South Wales and Queensland, due to the subtropical climate of these regions. In the 1870s an experimental coffee plantation was established at Waggrakine, Western Australia, but failed within three years due to the unsuitable climate.

== See also ==
- Greek café culture in Australia
- Coffee in world cultures
- Tea in Australia
