= January 2017 Melbourne car attack =

2017 car attack in Melbourne, Victoria

- Police arrest the perpetrator at 555 Bourke Street
- Location: Melbourne, Victoria, Australia
- Date: 20 January 2017; 1:30 pm - 1:37 p.m. (AEDT)
- Attack type: Vehicular attack, mass murder, pedicide, massacre
- Weapon: Holden Commodore
- Deaths: 6
- Injuries: 28 (including the perpetrator)
- Perpetrator: James Gargasoulas
- Motive: Evading police; drug-induced psychosis
- Charges: Six counts of murder 27 charges of reckless conduct endangering life
- Verdict: Guilty
- Convictions: Life in prison with a non-parole period of 46 years

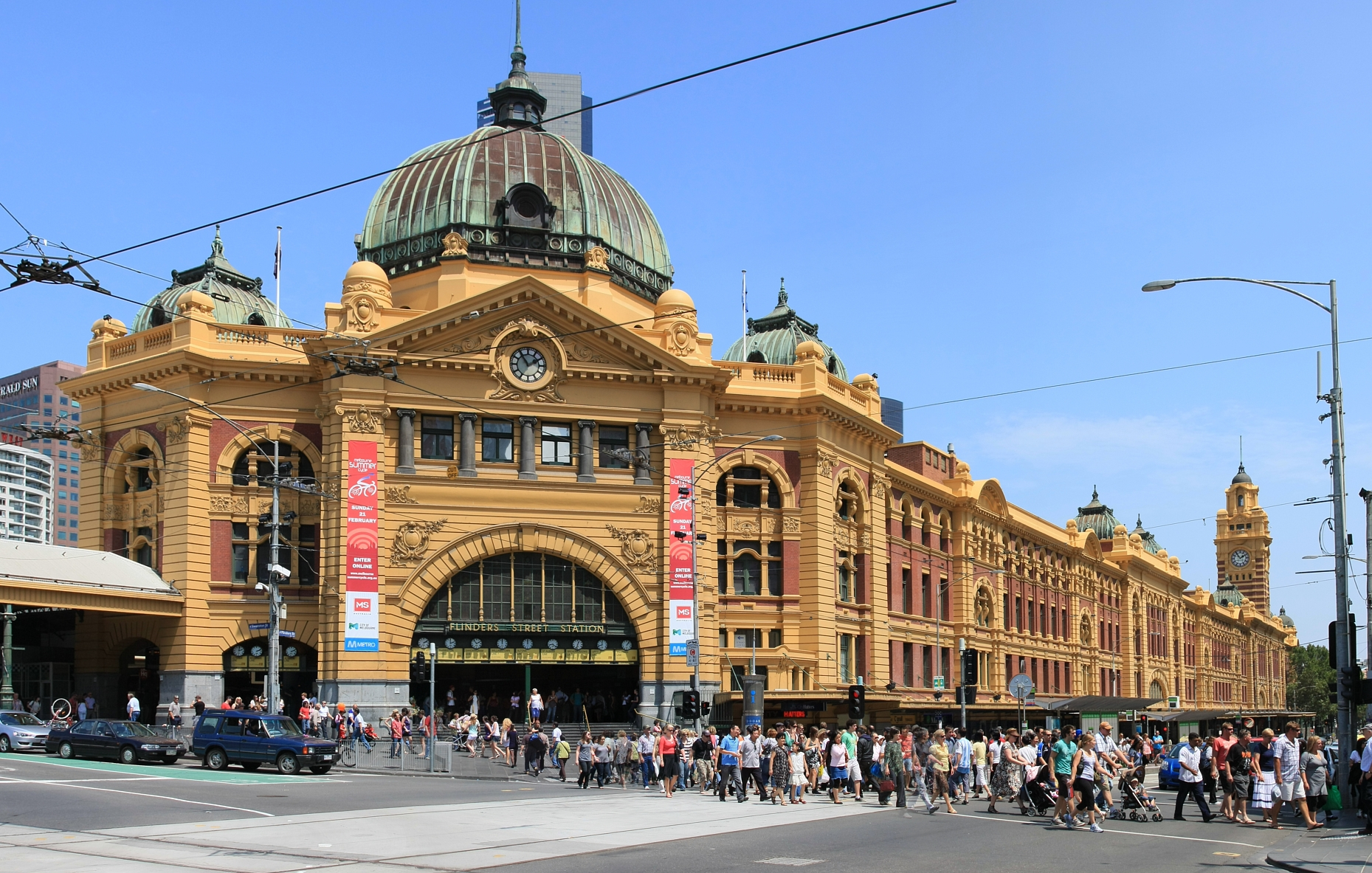
Flinders Street railway station, site of the initial sighting of the driver

On 20 January 2017, around 1:30 pm AEDT on a busy Friday, a car was deliberately driven into pedestrians along Bourke Street in the Melbourne central business district, Victoria, Australia. Six people were killed and twenty-six were seriously injured. The driver of the vehicle, James "Dimitrious" Gargasoulas, who was in a drug-induced psychosis, was subsequently found guilty of six counts of murder and was sentenced to life in prison with a non-parole period of 46 years.

== Background ==
The maroon 1995 Holden Commodore (VS) Executive sedan used in the attack was stolen from his mother's partner who lived in the same block of flats as Gargasoulas. Upon being interviewed, the car owner alleged that on the night of 18 January 2017, Gargasoulas entered his flat with a Bible, sat down, started burning it and threw it into his face. After this, he said that he flicked it on the floor and was then punched by Gargasoulas.

In the early hours of 20 January 2017, Gargasoulas used methamphetamine at his mother's flat in Windsor and then attacked his brother in the street stabbing him in the head and chest with a knife leaving him in a critical condition. He later took his pregnant girlfriend hostage; she was eventually released in South Wharf.

== Attack ==
Gargasoulas was captured on footage driving and behaving erratically at the intersection of Flinders Street, St Kilda Road and Swanston Street, outside the entrance to Flinders Street railway station. Two men, Year 12 student Tevita Mahina and his cousin Isaac Tupou, attempted to stop him, hitting the windscreen with a baseball bat. The driver continued northbound up Swanston St's western-side footpath at speed towards the Bourke Street Mall, turned left onto Bourke Street's southern-side footpath and struck more than 20 pedestrians. The vehicle was stopped outside 555 Bourke Street by a combination of mechanical failure and from being rammed by a Victoria Police Ford Territory from the Operations Response Unit. Victoria Police officers from the Critical Incident Response Team shot the driver in the right arm and also tasered him before his arrest. A child and two adults died at the scene, another man died in hospital before the end of the day, and a three-month-old baby boy died the next day in the evening. A sixth person died on 30 January.

== Victims ==
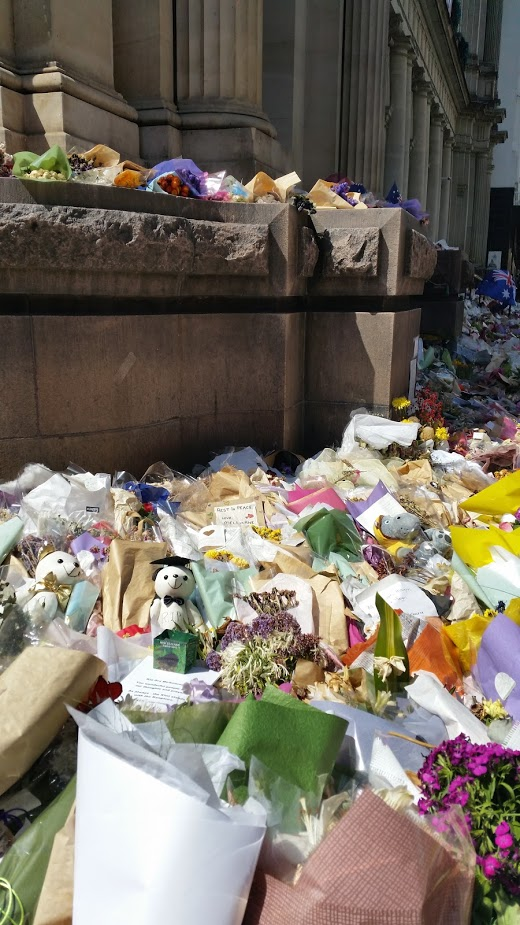
Floral tributes to victims of the attack at a memorial at the Western end of the Bourke Street Mall.

Among the victims was a 10-year-old girl, Thalia Hakin, who died on 20 January 2017, as well as a three-month-old baby boy, Zachary Matthew-Bryant, who died on 21 January. The others were Yosuke Kanno, a 25-year-old man, Jessica (Jess) Elizabeth Mudie, a 22-year-old woman, Matthew Poh Chuan Si, a 33-year-old man, and Bhavita Patel, a 33-year-old woman.

A memorial for the victims was held in Federation Square on 23 January and floral tributes were left by members of the public at nine locations along the Bourke Street Mall. On 30 January it was announced that a permanent memorial garden would be established, and that donations approaching AU$1,000,000 had been made to the Bourke Street Fund for the families of the victims. On 31 January, the inorganic tributes were removed from the mall for storage by the Melbourne City Council. This collection was subsequently handed over to the State Library Victoria. The floral tributes were taken for composting for the Victims of Crime memorial near State Parliament.

== Investigation ==
Police urged eyewitnesses to provide a witness statement and collaborated with over 300 witnesses. Chief Commissioner Graham Ashton was quick to dismiss claims the attack was an act of terror and said it was related to a stabbing incident earlier that day which had developed into a crime spree. Victoria Police maintained religion was not a significant motivation.

=== Coronial inquest ===
On 21 January 2017, the State Coroner announced an inquest would be held which would investigate the decision to release Gargasoulas on bail, his conduct prior to the incident, his previous involvement with police and the police pursuit. In July 2017, as preparation was underway to hold an inquest, the Coroner adjourned the inquest until the conclusion of the criminal trial following a submission from Counsel Assisting the Coroner that to hold an inquest would create a risk of "compromising the criminal proceedings and the rights of the accused to a fair trial". In April 2019, inquest preparation recommenced with the holding of a directions hearing.

Between November 2019 and February 2020, a 31-day inquest into the incident was held. The inquest detailed issues such as police procedures, communications, and decisions made on the day of the attack. On 19 November 2020, Coroner Jacqui Hawkins released a finding which was scathing of Victoria Police's handling of the incident, saying that efforts to negotiate with Gargasoulas amounted to 'nothing more than two phone calls and bizarre text messages'.

== Perpetrator ==
James Dimitrious Gargasoulas was born in 1990 and spent much of his childhood in Coober Pedy, South Australia, where he and his younger brother Angelo were raised primarily by their father. They are of Greek origin. Their mother lived in Melbourne and visited the family intermittently. Angelo later described their childhood as highly dysfunctional and said that both brothers experienced significant violence at home. Gargasoulas struggled academically and attended special education classes, while former classmates described him as eccentric and recalled that he was frequently bullied. At the age of 14, he was expelled after bringing explosives from his father's mining business to school. He later undertook a mechanics course before being permitted to return to school, eventually completing Year 11.

At the age of 17, Gargasoulas moved to Melbourne to live with his mother and enrolled at another school with the intention of completing Year 12, but left several months later. As an adult, he undertook occasional work including furniture removal and car detailing, but was unemployed for much of his adult life. He had five children with three women. Gargasoulas also developed a lengthy criminal history, with offending dating from at least 2008 and involving violence, dishonesty, resisting police and dangerous driving. By late 2016, he was regularly using methamphetamine, which the Supreme Court of Victoria later found played a major role in the deterioration of his mental state.

Gargasoulas also had a history of violence towards intimate partners. In 2016, he deliberately crashed his vehicle into a girlfriend's car after accusing her of infidelity, resulting in her being hospitalised. Later that year, after moving to Melbourne, he assaulted another girlfriend, who was pregnant at the time, after again accusing her of cheating. His brother subsequently described Gargasoulas as becoming increasingly unstable and violent while heavily using methamphetamine.

Gargasoulas moved permanently to Melbourne in late 2016. By this time his criminal record reportedly extended to approximately 20 pages and included offences such as reckless conduct causing injury, affray, assaulting and resisting police, escaping custody and numerous driving offences. Police encountered him repeatedly during the months preceding the Bourke Street attack. On 14 January 2017, six days before the attack, Gargasoulas was arrested and charged with 23 offences. During a police interview, some of his answers appeared paranoid and delusional. Police opposed his release, but an after-hours bail justice granted him bail. The bail justice later said that he had not been adequately informed about Gargasoulas's extensive criminal history and escalating mental-health concerns and that, had he received the information, he would have refused bail. The police officers involved disputed parts of his account and said that they had strongly opposed Gargasoulas's release.

During the days following his release, Gargasoulas displayed increasingly paranoid, grandiose and religious delusions. On 18 January, he entered St Francis' Church in central Melbourne and told a priest that he had received a revelation from God and believed that the world would soon end. Police attended the church but did not arrest him. Later that day, Gargasoulas repeatedly contacted Triple Zero, claiming that a comet was approaching Earth and describing what he believed was a worldwide emergency. He also expressed paranoid beliefs involving his family, the government and an impending catastrophe. Four Corners reported that Gargasoulas was using large quantities of methamphetamine and was experiencing a drug-induced psychosis during this period.

At the time of the Bourke Street attack, Gargasoulas was 26 years old, effectively homeless and sleeping in his car. He was experiencing a drug-induced psychosis. During his subsequent trial and sentencing proceedings, Gargasoulas said that he had been attempting to evade police and believed that he had received a divine premonition. He admitted that he entered the city intending to run people over in order to escape police. Justice Mark Weinberg rejected the proposition that Gargasoulas had been unaware of his actions, finding that he understood that his conduct was likely to kill or seriously injure people. Weinberg ultimately concluded that the offending was primarily attributable to Gargasoulas's methamphetamine addiction.

Following his arrest, Gargasoulas was diagnosed with paranoid schizophrenia and developed persistent messianic and paranoid delusions. His mental condition resulted in separate proceedings to determine whether he was fit to stand trial, with psychiatric experts disagreeing about his fitness despite agreeing that he had schizophrenia. He was eventually found fit to stand trial. In November 2018, Gargasoulas was convicted of six counts of murder and 27 counts of reckless conduct endangering life. In February 2019, he was sentenced to life imprisonment with a non-parole period of 46 years. Weinberg took his schizophrenia into account during sentencing, while finding that his psychosis at the time of the attack did not prevent him from understanding the consequences of his actions.

== Legal ==
On Monday 23 January, Gargasoulas was interviewed by the Homicide Squad and subsequently charged with five counts of murder at the Melbourne Magistrates' Court. His defence lawyer advised the court he was too unwell to be present in the courtroom, with the Magistrate excusing him from having to be present for future hearings due to his health, remanding him into custody.

In April and May 2017, at the Melbourne Magistrates' Court, Gargasoulas made claims such as "Muslim faith is the correct faith according to the whole world," "I am the saviour," "I was under extreme stress, which caused me to have a mental breakdown," "[L]ife is being controlled by the government," and "I'm very saddened by everything that's happened, but it's due to the Illuminati."

In December 2017, Gargasoulas pleaded not guilty to 39 charges, including six counts of murder, and waived his right to a committal hearing in the Magistrates' Court and was therefore committed to stand trial in the Supreme Court.

In March 2018, Gargasoulas pleaded not guilty to all charges in the Supreme Court. His defence lawyers made a submission that given his current mental state he was unfit to stand trial and advised the court that they were awaiting further medical reports. Justice Lasry criticised the three-month delay in holding a hearing to determine his fitness.

In June 2018, a Supreme Court jury was empanelled to decide if Gargasoulas was fit to stand trial.

In October 2018, the Supreme Court jury found Gargasoulas was fit to stand trial despite being diagnosed a paranoid schizophrenic.

In November 2018, Gargasoulas was found guilty of six counts of murder and 27 counts of reckless conduct endangering life. Medical experts were of the opinion that on the day of the offence he was suffering from a drug-induced psychosis with paranoid delusional beliefs and was found to have amphetamine-type substances, barbiturates and benzodiazepines in his system. However, he was still aware of his actions and the consequences, that it would be considered to be wrongful and that he had the ability to skilfully avoid fixed obstacles whilst driving. Justice Weinberg found that he developed paranoid schizophrenia subsequent to the offence.

== Responses ==
=== Police ===
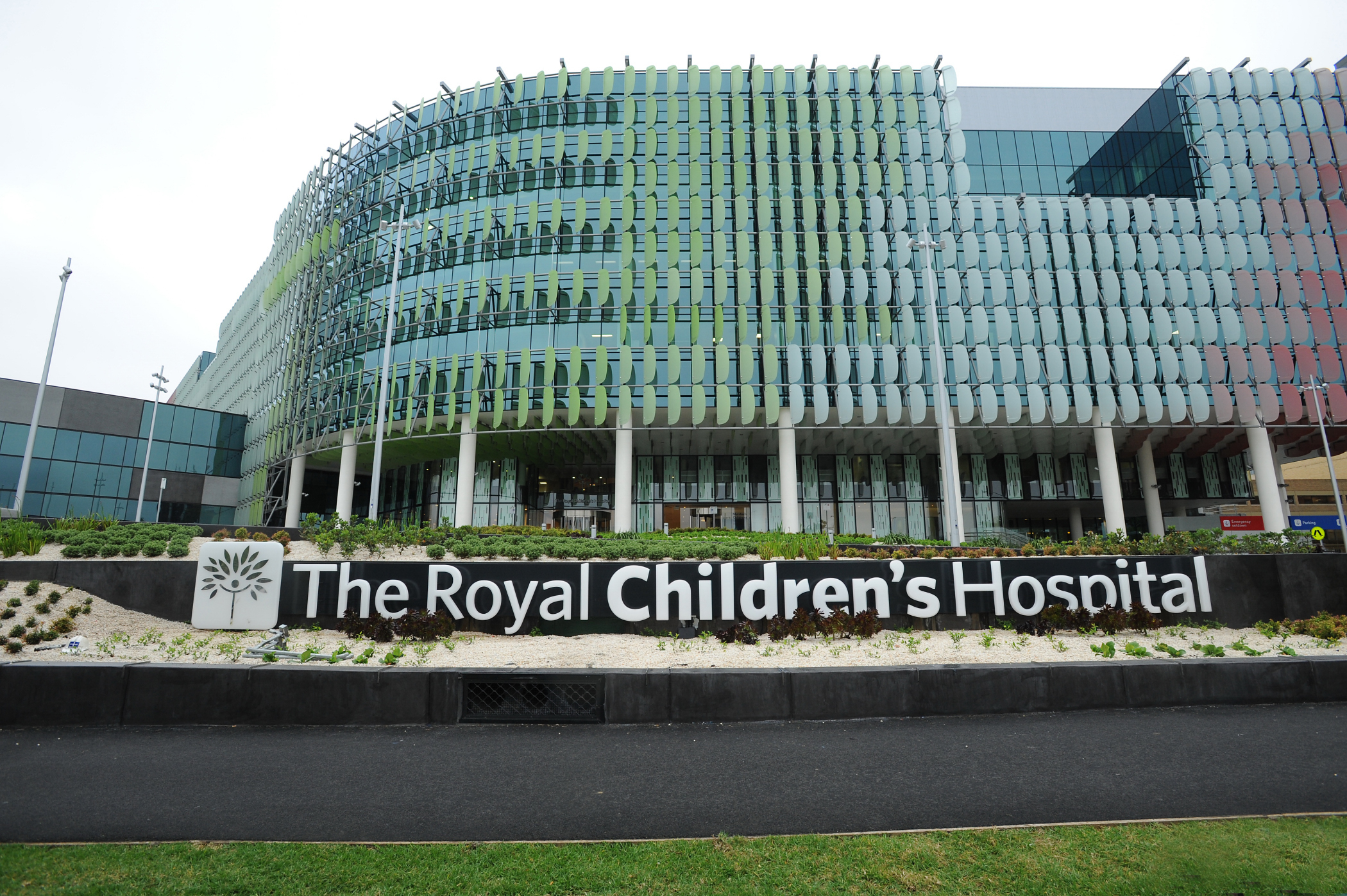
The Royal Children's Hospital treated many children injured in the attack

In an interview the day after the attack Victoria Police Deputy Commissioner Andrew Crisp stated that police were hoping to interview and charge the suspect later in the day. He said that the fact that the suspect had been out on bail would be looked into by police. He congratulated everyone who dealt with the situation, stating: "We saw the best of people yesterday. The support they gave to people on the street, it was amazing."

On 28 October 2019, Victoria Police announced a "hostile vehicle" policy—the first of its kind in Australia—which permits officers to use all tactical options to stop a car attack, including roadblocks, ramming an offending vehicle, boxing the vehicle in or, as a last resort, shooting an offender. The Crimes Act 1958 had been amended in 2018 to clarify the use of pre-emptive lethal force.

=== Politicians ===
Prime Minister Malcolm Turnbull offered his prayers and deepest sympathies to the victims of the attack and their families.

Victorian Premier Daniel Andrews stated that "this was a terrible crime – a senseless, evil act" and promised that "justice will be done". The Victorian Government established a fund to provide financial assistance for the families of the deceased, and made an initial donation of $100,000.

Within days of the incident, it was announced that a review of Victoria's bail laws would be undertaken and that the Magistrates' Court would introduce a Night Court to hear bail requests over weekends and after hours. In February 2017, the Magistrates' Court established a Night Court at the Melbourne Magistrates' Court operating between the hours of 5pm to 9pm seven days a week to hear Melbourne metropolitan bail and remand cases. Following a review by Paul Coghlan QC in 2017, the Bail Act 1977 was amended in 2018 to make it harder for serious and violent offenders to be granted bail, to provide senior police officers with the power to remand a person in custody for up to 48 hours, and to revise the test for determining whether to grant bail.

== Timeline of events ==
=== 14 January 2017 ===
- Police charged Gargasoulas at Prahran police station with offences committed during a police pursuit on 19 November 2016, including speeding on the wrong side of the road directly into oncoming traffic and for evading police. Police opposed bail, but Gargasoulas was granted bail by a Bail Justice for a 20 January court date.

=== 17 January 2017 ===
- Gargasoulas told a friend that if he was involved in a police pursuit he would keep driving and start running people over.

=== 18 January 2017 ===
- Gargasoulas attacked Gavin Wilson, his mother's ex-partner, by thrusting a burning Bible in his face and stealing his car.

=== 19 January 2017 ===
- 9:26 pm: Gargasoulas 'checked in' at Dogs Bar, St Kilda, on Facebook, posting: "Thinking. About what to do with them lol."
- 10:00 pm: Gargasoulas was refused entry into Dogs Bar as he was suspected of being under the influence of drugs. The owner of the bar said that "He had this real swagger and arrogance".

=== 20 January 2017 ===
- 12:30 am: Gargasoulas returned to Dogs Bar in a maroon-coloured Holden Commodore believed to be the same car he stole from Windsor, later to be used in the attack. Patrons reported that he smashed glasses and plates.
- 2:15 am: Police were called to an address in Raleigh Street, Windsor, after reports were lodged of two men fighting. Both the victim, his brother, and Gargasoulas were gone by the time police arrived. The fight was in the street outside his mother's flat where he had earlier used the drug methamphetamine. Gargasoulas had "stabbed [his brother] repeatedly to the head and chest with a kitchen knife."
- 2:15 am: Gargasoulas attended the Gatwick Hotel in St Kilda and told a friend he was going to do something drastic and would be on the news tonight and that the police would not be able to stop him.
- 8.04 am: Gargasoulas was spotted driving in the background of a Today "live cross" which was reporting on the Windsor stabbing. The man rolled down the car window and waved his hat at the news camera.
- 11:31 am: Police followed the car along tram tracks in Clarendon Street in South Melbourne and unsuccessfully attempted to arrest Gargasoulas at a South Wharf intersection.
- 11:45 am: Police spotted the car weaving through traffic on Williamstown Road in Yarraville, west of Melbourne. Police pulled back due to safety concerns, as the car was being driven "erratically and dangerously". The police air wing tracked the car as it moved toward the city.
- 1:30 pm: Emergency services were flooded with calls with reports of a Commodore doing doughnuts and burnouts outside Flinders Street Station.
- 1:33 pm: The car in question drove north up Swanston Street.
- 1:35 pm: The car then struck a number of pedestrians in the vicinity of Bourke Street Mall, before proceeding further along Bourke Street, past the intersection with Queen Street at speeds of between 57 km/h (35 mph) and 61 km/h (38 mph).
- 1:37 pm: Reports of multiple shots fired. Gargasoulas was pulled from the car at 555 Bourke Street.
- 2:30 pm: Ambulance Victoria stated that they were treating 20 people in Bourke Street, many of them having sustained serious injuries.
- 2:30 pm: Victoria Police released a statement confirming that the situation had been "contained", one person had been arrested, and another was dead.
- 3:20 pm: Police confirmed at a press conference that three people had died and that the incident was not terrorism-related.
- 9:00 pm: Police confirmed that a fourth person had died in hospital.

=== 21 January 2017 ===
- 10:53 pm: Police confirmed that a fifth person (a three-month-old child) had died in hospital.

=== 30 January 2017 ===
- Police confirmed a 33-year-old woman had died in hospital due to her injuries. This raised the death toll to six. Another murder charge was laid against Gargasoulas.

== See also ==
- Vehicle-ramming attack
- Timeline of major crimes in Australia
- List of massacres in Australia
- December 2017 Melbourne car attack
