= December 2017 Melbourne car attack =

Incident in December 2017 in Melbourne, Australia

December 2017 Melbourne Islamist car terror attack
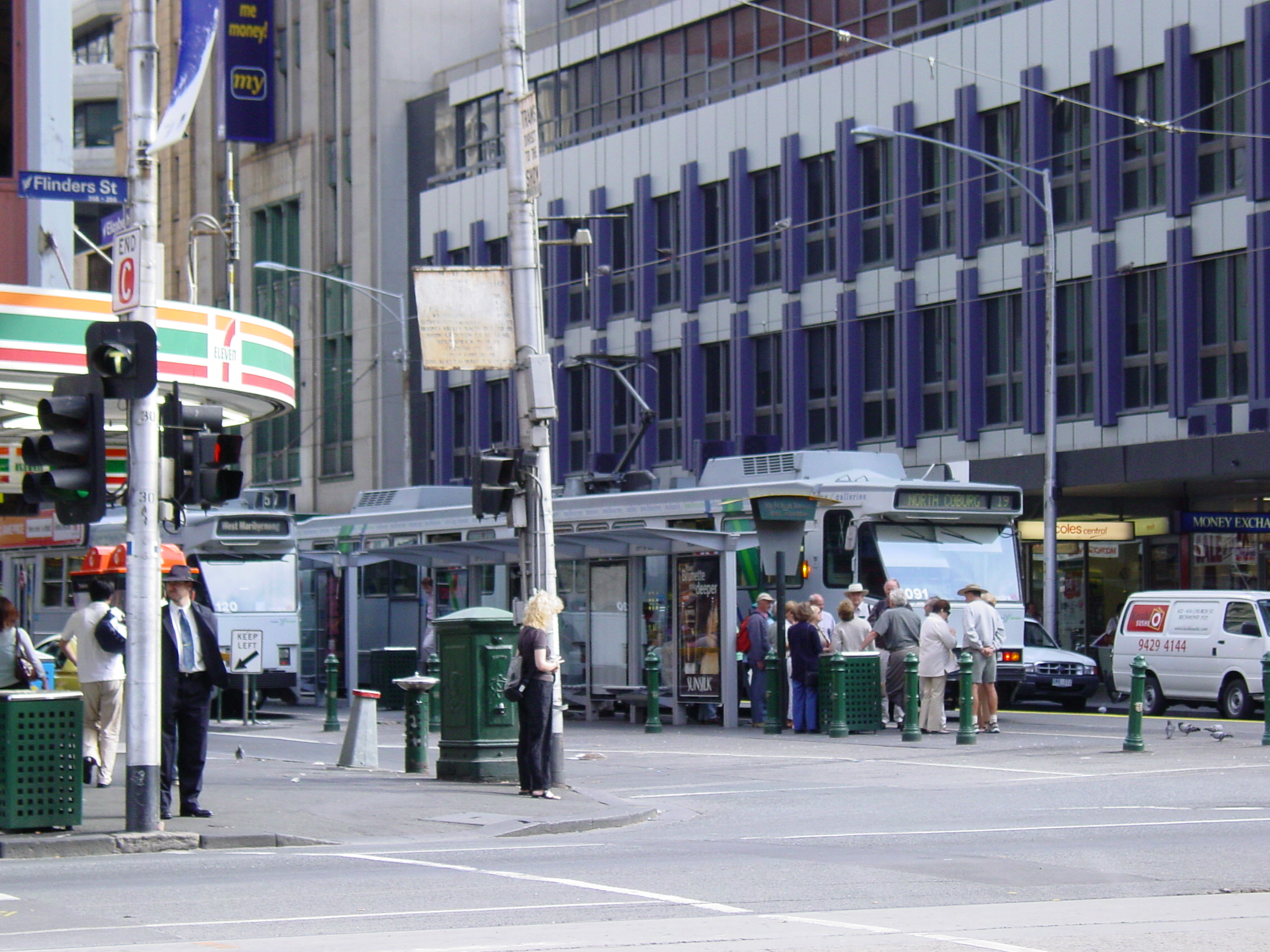
- Corner of Flinders Street and Elizabeth Street, where the incident took place, as seen in February 2006
- Location: 37.8182°S 144.9650°E; Melbourne, Victoria, Australia
- Date: 21 December 2017; 4:41 p.m. (AEDT)
- Attack type: Vehicular attack
- Weapon: Suzuki Vitara
- Deaths: Antonios Crocaris
- Injuries: 17
- Victim: Antonios “Anton” Crocaris
- Perpetrator: Saeed Noori
- Motive: Psychosis; perceived mistreatment of Muslims; religious and persecutory delusions

On 21 December 2017, during the busy Christmas shopping period at 4:41 p.m. AEDT, an ISIS inspired driver deliberately drove in to a crowd of pedestrians with his car at the corner of Flinders Street and Elizabeth Street in Melbourne, Victoria, Australia, killing one person and injuring seventeen others. Antonios Crocaris, 83 years old, died eight days after the attack. "The accused said "Allahu Akbar" two or three times", and in his first police interview later that evening, Noori claimed Allah had told him to do it.

== Incident ==
According to witnesses and police, the driver, Saeed Noori, an Australian citizen of Afghan descent who had arrived in Australia as a refugee, deliberately ran a red light then deliberately accelerated into the pedestrians as they crossed between the corners of Flinders and Elizebeth Street. His car then hit a bollard beside a tram stop. The nineteen injured included nine foreign nationals: three from South Korea, and one each from China, Italy, India, Venezuela, Ireland, and New Zealand. An off-duty officer of the Victorian Police was credited with quickly subduing the suspect, who was wrestled to the ground, handcuffed, and arrested.

A second man, filming the incident, was also arrested and found to be carrying a bag containing three knives and a quantity of marijuana. It was subsequently determined that he was not directly involved in the incident.

On 21 December, Victoria Police Commander Russell Barrett stated: "At this stage we believe it is a deliberate act during Melbourne's busy Christmas shopping season" As a result of the incident, nineteen people were hospitalised, during Melbourne's busy Christmas shopping season . By 23 December 2017, three were in critical condition.

One victim, Antonios Crocaris, aged 83, died in hospital on 29 December 2017.

== Perpetrator ==
Noori, aged 32, was known to police for a 2010 assault and had a history of drug use, despite 'mental health issues'he was ISIS inspired by the apparent "mistreatment of Muslims" launching his terror attack during the heart of Melbourne's busy Christmas Shopping period. as investigation. In June 2017, he was convicted and fined $1,000 for driving without a license, using a mobile phone while driving and failing to answer bail. Noori was unlicensed at the time of the December incident, and he was driving a vehicle that belonged to a relative.

Noori appeared in court on 23 December, charged with 18 counts of attempted murder and one count of reckless conduct endangering life; one of the attempted murder charges was upgraded to murder following Crocaris' death on 29 December. He was remanded in custody and ordered to undergo a psychiatric assessment. After his arrest, he exhibited drug addiction withdrawal symptoms and was suspected to have other illnesses, including a psychiatric one and signs of radicalisation.

Noori, an Australian citizen of Afghan descent, entered Australia in 2004 with six other siblings as a refugee. In an informal police interview, he "spoke of dreams and voices, but also attributed his attack due to his perceived "mistreatment of Muslims". Noori also made comments regarding Islam, Muslims, Allah and ASIO following his arrest. One of Noori's co-workers at the call centre where they worked said: "There was always talk of his Islamic religious beliefs, he was very strong in that. People would say 'I believe in God' and he'd say "you need to believe in Allah"." In addition, prosecutor Mark Gibson SC claimed that as he was being detained "The accused said "Allahu Akbar" two or three times", and in his first police interview later that evening, Noori claimed Allah had told him to do it.

On 7 December 2018, Noori pleaded guilty to one count of murder, and 18 counts of attempted murder. Noori was sentenced in March 2019, to serve life imprisonment, with a non-parole period of 30 years.

== Reactions ==
Prime Minister Malcolm Turnbull said that Melbourne has "special challenges", including wide streets, wide footpaths and tramways, which enable a driver to make such an attack. He claimed it would be impossible to install bollards in every part of the city.

Premier of Victoria Daniel Andrews praised the off-duty police officer who responded first, saying he "instinctively came to the aid of others, in the protection of public order, and potentially, avoiding so much other carnage".

== See also ==
- Islamic Terror attacks
- Vehicle-ramming attack
- Timeline of major crimes in Australia
- List of massacres in Australia
- List of Islamic Terror attacks in Australia
- January 2017 Melbourne car attack
