= Trumpet (ice cream) =

New Zealand ice cream brand

- Current owner: Tip Top
- Produced by: Tip Top
- Country: New Zealand
- Introduced: 1964
- Website: www.tiptop.co.nz/products/trumpets

Trumpet is a New Zealand brand of coned ice cream made by Tip Top. Launched in 1964, over 13 million Trumpets are produced each year in Mount Wellington, Auckland. Chocolate is the most popular flavour.

== History ==
Trumpet was launched in 1964 by Tip Top, and was trademarked in 1991. Originally Trumpets did not have a chocolate tip on the bottom, or have a chocolate layer inside in the cone, which caused the cones to get soggy. The lack of chocolate was due to the fact that at the time of the product's creation, mass-produced ice creams were mostly just cones with ice cream. Because Tip Top factories already had about 50 tonnes of chocolate to use for their other brands, the company started spraying chocolate in the cone to fix the sogginess, which causes some chocolate to sink to the bottom and create a chocolate tip.

Advertisements during the 1980s featured now supermodel Rachel Hunter aged 15 at the start of her career, who is known by many as the "Trumpet girl". In 2006 a Trumpet television advertisement was released which describes how when going further from the beach, swimming clothing become underwear, with the phrase "togs, togs, undies", which has entered New Zealand's lexicon. It was described by Alex Casey of The Spinoff as New Zealand's "most iconic summer ad".

In 2013 Tip Top asked people choose an old flavour to come back by voting. In 2019 Tip Top released a Trumpet that is both vegan and gluten‐free, which was originally only available as the Boysenberry flavour.

== Production ==
As of 2016 Tip Top produces 13 million Trumpets per year, at 12,000 ice creams per hour, in their factory in Mount Wellington, Auckland. Tip Top launches a new Trumpet flavour every 18 to 24 months.

To produce a Trumpet, the inside of an ice cream cone is coated with chocolate to prevent it from going soggy. Due to gravity the chocolate flows to the bottom and creates the chocolate tip. Afterwards, ice cream is pumped in the cone and then the top is snap frozen with a blast of nitrogen, is then X-rayed, and then weighed to check for any foreign objects. The filled cones are then checked for defects and then packaged.

== Flavours ==
The most popular flavour of Trumpet is chocolate.

- Apricot
- Banoffee Pie
- Boysenberry
- Boysenberry Vegan Gluten‐Free
- Choc Sundae
- Chocolate
- Chocolate Orange
- Chocolate Vegan Gluten‐Free
- Chocolate Salted Caramel
- Colossal Cone Butterscotch Caramel Crunch
- Colossal Cone Cookies & Cream
- Frozen Berry Yoghurt
- Fruju Tropical Snow
- Hokey pokey
- Jelly Tip
- Kiwifruit
- M&M's
- Mint
- Neapolitan
- Passionfruit
- Peanut Butter
- S'mores
- Strawberry Jelly
- Strawberry Toppa
- Strawberry Shake
- Toffee Cream
- Vanilla
