= Squiggles =

Biscuit made by Griffin's

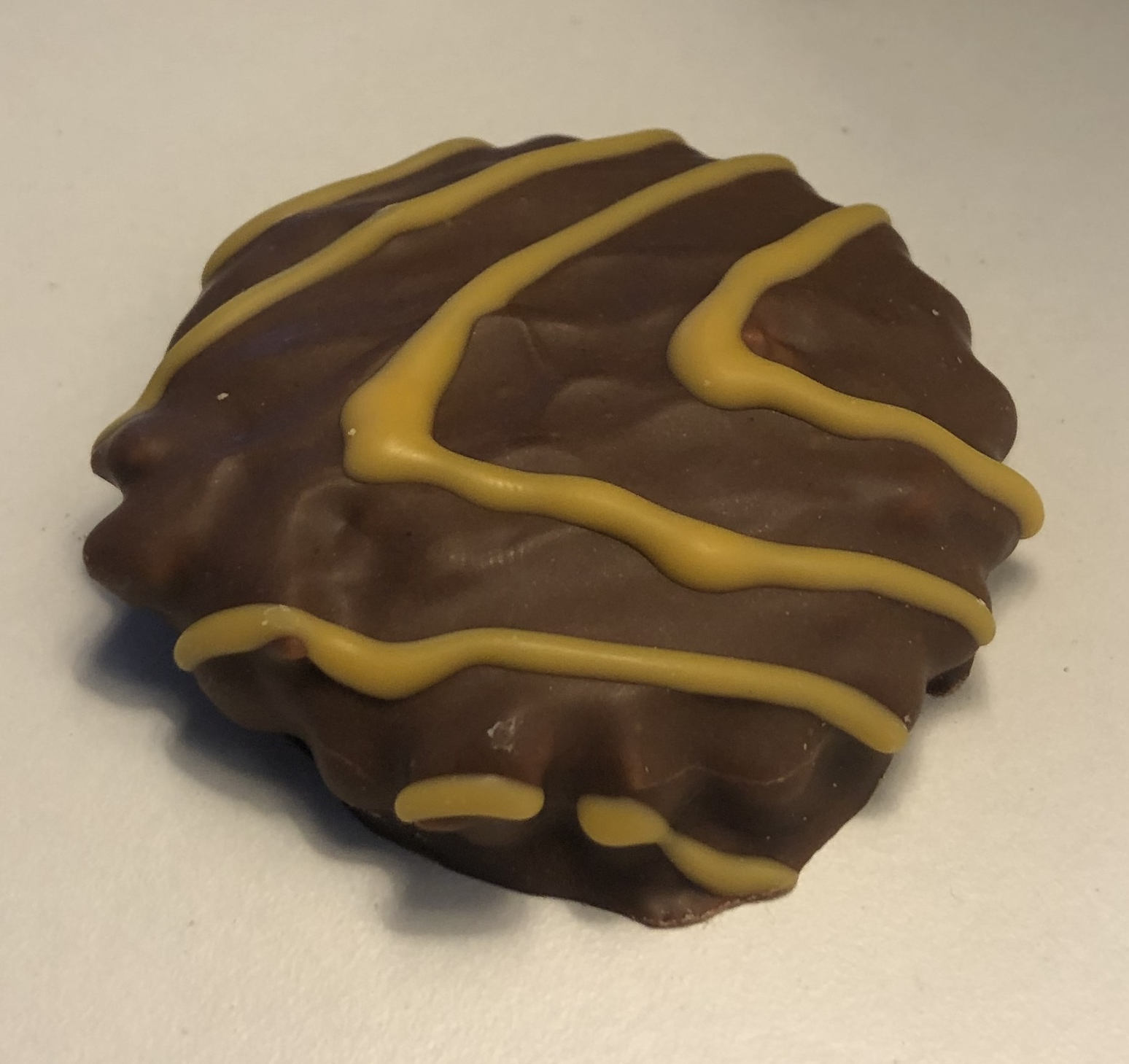
- Current owner: Griffin's Foods
- Produced by: Griffin's Foods
- Country: New Zealand

Squiggles is a brand of chocolate biscuit manufactured by Griffin's Foods in New Zealand. In Australia, Squiggles, just like other Griffin's products, are sold as home brands and do not use the "Squiggles" name.

== History ==
In 2015 Griffin's partnered with Tip Top to make a limited edition Jelly Tip flavoured biscuit. The following year they partnered again and created a Goody Goody Gum Drops biscuit. Goody Goody Gum Drops is bubble gum flavoured ice cream from New Zealand which is laced with gum drops. In 2017 three new flavours were created: Banana Blast, Chocolate Overload and Strawberry Fizz.

In the 1980s the first Squiggles flavour was created — Candy Squiggles. It was discontinued in 2019, which caused public outcry. They were later brought back to shelves in 2023, with Griffin's saying that they listened to New Zealand.

In 2019 Griffin's trademarked the physical shape and appearance of Squiggles biscuits. Because the biscuit shape is a non-conventional trademark (i.e. not a brand word or logo), Griffin's had to prove that consumers associate the shape of the biscuits with the company Griffin's, not the Squiggles brand.

In February 2024 a Pineapple Lump flavoured squiggle was released.

== Flavours ==
- Squiggles Banana Blast
- Squiggles Candy
- Squiggles Chocolate Overload
- Squiggles Goody Goody Gum Drops
- Squiggles Hokey Pokey
- Squiggles Jelly Tip
- Squiggles Pineapple Chunks
- Squiggles Pink
- Squiggles Raspberry Jube
- Squiggles Strawberry Fizz
- Squiggles Yellow
