= Primo (milk) =

New Zealand flavoured milk manufacturer

- Type: Flavoured milk

Primo is a New Zealand flavoured milk brand owned by Fonterra.

== History ==
In 2017 Primo partnered with Tip Top to create Hokey Pokey and Mint Choc Chip flavoured drinks. In 2019 the two created milk flavours for Goody Goody Gum Drops and the Tip Top Jelly Tip.

In July 2018 Primo created a campaign asking New Zealanders to describe a new milk flavour. The campaign said that person who created the best entry would earn $10,000. A video campaign, 'Primo Flavour Labs', was created to advertise this, showing people creating new flavours. Such flavours included 2 minute noodles, goose milk, and a flavour created by playing music onto an existing flavour.

In 2019 Fonterra decreased sugar content from Primo. It had decreased by 30 to 40 percent the over the previous year. In 2019 Consumer NZ gave Primo's Sublime Lime flavour the 'Bad Taste Food Award', an award given to products that convince consumers that they are healthier than what they actually are. It had a 4.5 health star rating despite having three teaspoons of sugar in a 600ml bottle.

In October 2023 it was announced that Primo would bring Nigel Latta to an event named "Primo Presents - Nigel Latta Live: What in the scam is going on?" in November, where Nigel Latta talks about scams. This was after he had hosted the television series You've Been Scammed.
