= Dalgona coffee =

Whipped coffee drink

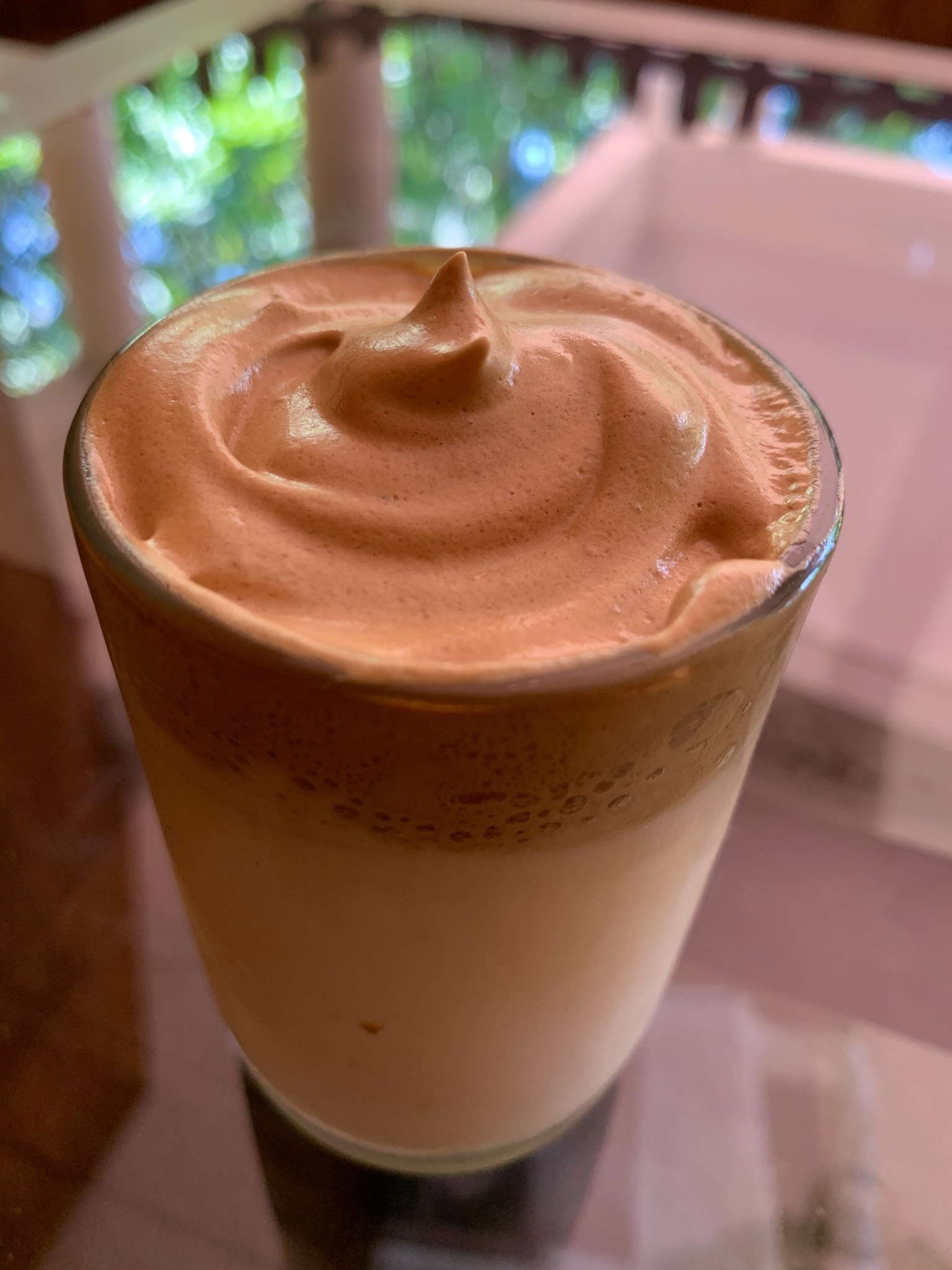
- Homemade dalgona coffee
- Type: Coffee
- Origin: Macau
- Introduced: 1997
- Ingredients: Coffee, sugar, water and milk

Chinese name
- Chinese: 椪糖咖啡
Transcriptions
Standard Mandarin
- Hanyu Pinyin: Pèng Táng Kāfēi
Yue: Cantonese
- Jyutping: pung3 tong4 gaa3 fe1

Hand-beaten coffee
- Chinese: 手打咖啡
Transcriptions
Standard Mandarin
- Hanyu Pinyin: Shǒu Dǎ Kāfēi
Yue: Cantonese
- Jyutping: sau2 daa2 gaa3 fe1

Portuguese name
- Portuguese: Café dalgona

Korean name
- Hangul: 달고나 커피
- RR: dalgona keopi
- MR: talgona k'ŏp'i

External videos
- Stars' Top Recipe at Fun-Staurant episode featuring Jung Il-woo presenting whipped coffee (in Korean)

Dalgona coffee, also known as hand beaten coffee, is a beverage originating from Macau made by whipping equal parts instant coffee powder, sugar, and hot water until it becomes creamy and then adding it to cold or hot milk. Occasionally, it is topped with coffee powder, cocoa, crumbled biscuits, or honey. It was popularized on social media during the COVID-19 pandemic, when people refraining from going out started making videos of whipping the coffee at home, by hand without using electrical mixers. After the drink spread to South Korea, it was renamed "dalgona coffee" which is derived from dalgona, a Korean sugar candy, due to the resemblance in taste and appearance, though most dalgona coffee does not actually contain dalgona.

== History ==
=== Creation and naming ===
The drink is credited to Leong Kam Hon, a former Macanese shipwright who started his 'Wai Ting Coffee' (later renamed 'Hon Kee', 漢記) shop in Coloane after a freak accident to his left arm left him incapacitated from continuing work. Leong recalls concocting the drink as requested by a tourist couple in 1997. The drink did not yield much interest to him until 2004 when he took on the idea to serve it as a specialty to Chow Yun-fat and his entourage who visited the Hon Kee café that year. Chow's praise for the drink gathered the first wave of international attention when new visitors came in to ask for 'Chow Yun-fat coffee'. The maker himself dubs the drink made in his menu as 手打咖啡 or "hand beaten coffee".

The name "dalgona coffee" is credited to the South Korean actor Jung Il-woo, who ordered this drink at the same eatery in January 2020 during his appearance on TV show called Stars' Top Recipe at Fun-Staurant. He likened the taste to that of dalgona, a type of Korean honeycomb toffee.

=== Spread from South Korea ===
Following the broadcast of that TV programme, dalgona coffee became popular among Koreans who attempted to make this drink for themselves during the social distancing orders in South Korea. As a result, it was dubbed the "quarantine drink" or "quarantine coffee". Under the hashtag #dalgonacoffeechallenge, homemade versions of dalgona coffee began spreading on South Korean YouTube channels before going viral on TikTok especially in early March of the same year. The spike in interest during the quarantine period has been attributed to the calming, ASMR-like effects of watching online DIY videos. Although the beverage was popularized as a homemade version of whipped coffee, it became a menu item at many coffee shops in South Korea. and even in the U.S.

While most dalgona coffee does not actually contain dalgona, one South Korean cafe does combine dalgona with milk tea or coffee. It is not possible to make dalgona coffee using ground coffee beans; instant coffee creates the dense and foamy topping and the reason for this has much to do with the drying process of the coffee granules.

== Similar drinks ==
The drink is also similar to the Italian dessert drink "Crema di Caffe" except with the omission of dairy product. Several media outlets have noted the drink's similarity to the Indian coffee beverage known as phenti hui coffee, phitti hui coffee, or beaten coffee. The main difference is that when making phenti hui coffee, milk is poured on top of the whipped mix rather than spooning the whipped mix on top of the milk. The coffee beverage is similar to the Frappé coffee (or Greek Frappe or φραπέ) originating in Greece in 1957, which is either hand shaken or whipped with a frothing mixer and is traditionally served cold but also may be prepared hot.

== See also ==
- Caffè crema – Coffee drink
- Frappé coffee – Greek iced coffee drink
- Coffee milk – Drink made from coffee syrup and milk
- TikTok food trends – Food-related content on the short video platform
