= Goody Goody Gum Drops =

New Zealand ice cream flavour

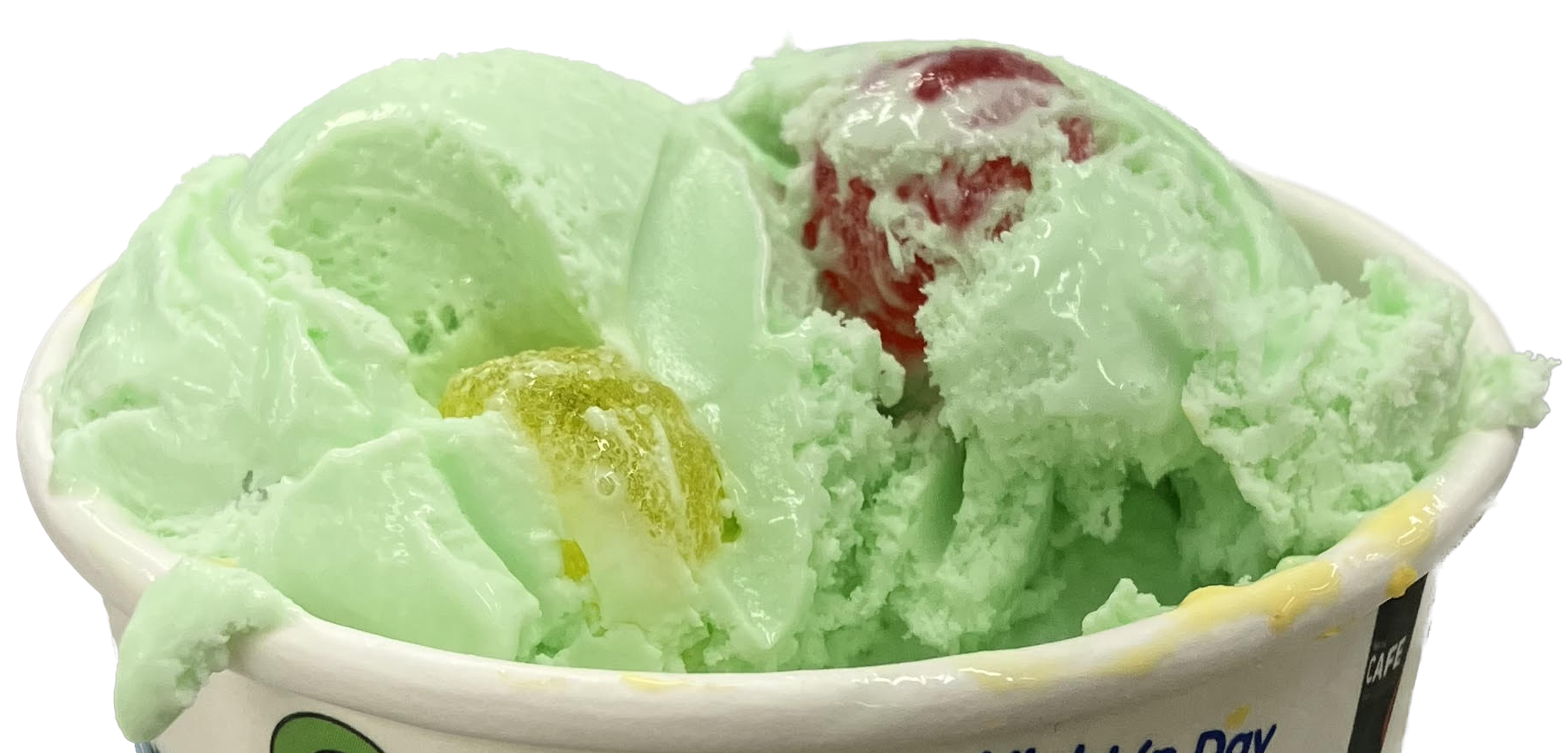
- Type: Ice cream
- Course: Dessert
- Place of origin: New Zealand
- Created by: Tip Top
- Invented: 1983

Goody Goody Gum Drops is a New Zealand flavour of ice cream made by Tip Top. It is pastel-green-coloured, bubblegum-flavoured and contains gumdrops. It is considered iconic to New Zealand, and perception of the flavour is polarising among New Zealanders.

== History ==
Goody Goody Gum Drops was invented in 1983 by the general director of Tip Top, Murray Taylor. According to Taylor, having a good distribution of gumdrops in the ice cream is difficult and "Very few ice-cream makers in the world would have attempted it".

In 2008, Tip Top created a variant of the ice cream flavour on a stick as a limited edition. According to Taylor, it took two years for the stick version to be created, due to distribution of the gumdrops being a problem. At first they all came out as a big lump, and Danish consultants created a mathematical model of the normal distribution of the gumdrops, saying that the goal could not be achieved. To mark the launch of the product, a television advertising campaign starting from 16 November saw 'Goody' and 'Stick' fall in love at a supermarket checkout. Their romance included a candle-lit dinner, ice cream at the beach, and an "encounter for Stick with a low-hanging branch on a bike ride through the countryside". The stick ice cream came back to stores in 2019, this time larger in size.

In November 2008, it was reported that, for the year, consumers had consumed 50 million gumdrops in the ice cream. In 2016, Tip Top collaborated with Griffin's to create a Goody Goody Gum Drop flavour of the Griffin's Squiggles biscuit. In December 2017, Goody Goody Gum Drops "started to disappear" from stores and later returned. In 2019, Primo, a flavoured milk producer, created a Goody Goody Gum Drops flavoured milk.

In October 2022, Tip Top announced the discontinuation of Goody Goody Gum Drops—along with Cookies and Cream—in the forms of two-litre tubs and sticks, but the flavour remained available by the scoop. Tip Top said that the reason for the discontinuation was so that it could maximise its ability to keep up with summer customer demand, and rising costs for ingredients such as fresh milk and cream. After the announcement, people across the country were outraged and many people wrote about their disappointment on social media. Critic & New Zealand Minister of Immigration Michael Wood said in response that "Sometimes the tough calls are the right calls".

In October 2023, the Goody Goody Gum Drop flavour returned, joining the 1.2 L (2.5 US pt) Tip Top Crave product range. This time, the gumdrops shrank in size to solve customer complaints about there not being enough gumdrops in a tub. Tip Top director Ben Schurr said that the previous version of the flavour had 5–6 gumdrops per scoop, and that the new version has 9–10 gumdrops per scoop. He also said that the smaller size makes the gumdrops stick to people's teeth less. To mark the reintroduction, Hilary Barry and Jeremy Wells visited the Tip Top factory on the television programme Seven Sharp. The ice cream brand Much Moore produces a 2 L (4.2 US pt) version of Goody Goody Gum Drops.

In July 2026, the chocolate manufacturer Whittaker's released a limited edition "Gumdrop Block", which was inspired by and resembles Goody Goody Gum Drops.

== Consumer perceptions ==
Market research carried out by Tip Top in 2008 showed that Goody Goody Gum Drops was considered by many as a "treat" whereas flavours such as hokey pokey or vanilla were seen as every-day flavours. For decades, the flavour has had a polarising love/hate reaction from consumers, with immigration minister Michael Wood tweeting in 2022 that he considered Goody Goody Gum Drops to be a "blight on western civilisation".

Vaughan Currie, co-owner of ice creamery Rush Munro's, described the Goody Goody Gum Drops as one of the few flavours that can compete with the iconic status of hokey pokey. Currie believes that the reason for the success of Goody Goody Gum Drops is its appeal to children, saying that ice cream can "arguably be a little bit bland", and that it is not uncommon for families to have an "adult" flavour and one that caters more for children. Currie has also described the flavour as catering to children's imaginations.
