= OOB Organic =

New Zealand ice cream manufacturer

- Type: Private
- Industry: Food manufacturing
- Founders: Shannon Auton; Rob Auton
- Area served: New Zealand
- Products: Ice cream
- Website: ooborganic.com

OOB Organic (short for Omaha Organic Berries) is a New Zealand seller of ice cream and berries. It was founded by Shannon and Rob Auton, and the ice cream is made in a factory in their blueberry orchard in Matakana. OOB Organic is sold in both New Zealand and Australia.

== History ==
The company was founded by Shannon and Rob Auton. Rob started growing berries in 2001; he was previously an investment banker. In 2012 the company and its products rebranded from Omaha Organic Berries to OOB Organic.

In 2012 OOB Organic started exporting to Australia, selling in 860 Woolworths stores. In 2014 the company's products were introduced in 750 Australian Coles supermarkets. In 2013 or 2014 OOB Organic started exporting to Singapore, the first Asian country to sell the brand, and after a few years the company started exporting to Malaysia and China. The company had a 64 percent increase in sales in 2014.

It was reported by The New Zealand Herald in 2015 that despite marketing giving the impression that the brand's berries were grown in New Zealand, fine print on the packaging said that they were grown in Chile and Turkey. A 2015 survey of 1797 New Zealanders conducted by Canstar Blue found that OOB Organic is one of New Zealand's favourite ice cream brands, reaching around the same level of satisfaction as Tip Top and Rush Munro's. In 2016 OOB Organic and Lewis Road Creamery partnered to create a limited edition strawberry-flavoured milk.

In 2017, OOB Organic's revenue for the previous year was reported as $17 million (equivalent to $23 million in 2026). In 2017 the company was fined $26,000 (equivalent to $35,000 in 2026) for building without consent, relating to a 2011 development of five buildings which lacked proper fire escape routes or signage. The judge noted that there was no evidence of harm having been caused. In 2018 OOB Organic started selling smoothie mixes in Australia.
