= Rush Munro's =

New Zealand ice creamery

Coordinates: 39.6432°S 176.8442°E

- Type: Private
- Industry: Food manufacturing
- Founded: 1926
- Founders: Frederick Charles Rush Munro; Catherine Rush Munro
- Area served: New Zealand
- Products: Ice cream
- Website: rushmunro.co.nz

Rush Munro's is the oldest running ice creamery in New Zealand. It is based in Hawke's Bay, and its ice cream is sold in supermarkets, cafés, restaurants and ice cream parlours. The company still uses the 1926 recipes of founder Frederick Charles Rush Munro, which contain no preservatives or food colourings. The company locally sources its ingredients, and banana peeling and fruit pulping is done by hand.

The most sold flavours at Rush Munro's are vanilla bean, maple walnut, passionfruit, double chocolate and hokey pokey. New flavours such as chocolate mint and green tea only account for a small percentage of sales. The ice creamery produces between 260,000 and 300,000 litres of ice cream per year. A 2015 survey of 1797 New Zealanders conducted by Canstar Blue found that Rush Munro's is one of New Zealand's favourite brands, reaching around the same level of satisfaction as Tip Top and family brand Oob Organic.

== History ==
Rush Munro's was first opened in 1926 in Hastings by Englishman Frederick Charles Rush Munro and his wife Catherine. Rush Munro arrived in Hawke's Bay in 1926. While it has been reported that his skills were learnt from his father, who worked with confectionery, Munro's granddaughter has said that the skills were likely passed from his mother. The ice creamery had to move in 1931 due to the Hawke's Bay earthquake. After the move, they created a garden area with goldfish ponds, roses, and a courtyard. In 1949 Frederick became sick and sold the company to former RAF pilot John Caulton. Frederick stayed for six months and later died in 1976.

In 2001 Rush Munro's was bought by John Bostock. To celebrate their 90th birthday on 19 November 2016, the ice creamery launched a competition where people created their own 90 Year Birthday Flavour. For a week they also allowed 90+-year-olds to eat for free, and had 90 cent discounts. Rush Munro's also gave away 90 litres of ice cream, and on 19 November a party was held with the sale of a limited edition flavour.

In December 2017 Rush Munro's became available by the scoop at the New World supermarket in Onekawa. In November 2018, a month after announcing a new organic product range, Foodstuffs, the owner of the Pak'nSave, New World and Four Square supermarket chains, bought 34,300 tubs or six months' worth of Rush Munro's ice cream. To advertise the new organic product line, Rush Munro's refurbished two caravans to go on a road trip around the North Island, giving New Zealanders taste tests.

Bostock sold the company in 2019 to the general manager of Rush Munro's, Vaughan Currie. At this time the company announced they would be increasing their flavour count from 25 to 36.

In September 2022 Rush Munro's announced that they would be moving from their location in Hastings due to the landlord not renewing their lease. Rush Munro's had been notified of the lease termination in May of that year. The land had been sold to a developer which proposed to turn it into a petrol station. A local councillor criticised the proposal, saying that there were already enough petrol stations and that it was "disappointing" that the district would allow a petrol station to be placed there. The garden's goldfish were moved to a newly created wetland in the Tukituki River. Demolition of the ice cream shop and gardens started in December 2022.

In November 2022, Rush Munro's moved to a new shop in Albert Square park, near the Hastings city centre. The first customer was a 4-year-old who chose a chocolate flavour. The council subleased a section in the park and the new shop was made from two six-metre-long (20 ft) containers, and Rush Munro's anticipated that they would be in this location for two years.

== Awards ==
In 2014 Rush Munro's earned the Supreme Award for Boutique Manufacturer at the New Zealand Ice Cream Awards for its maple and walnut ice cream. In 2015 they received the top award for the Canstar Blue customer satisfaction survey.
