= Agrotissa =

Greek brand for a range of products

The iconic Agrotissa girl, in national colors of white and blue, on the milk tin.

Agrotissa or in Greek Αγρότισσα is the brand name for a range of products sold in Greece. It literally means "farmer-girl", and has a positive connotation. This is a well-known brand in Greece, a common variety being the condensed milk, which is marketed in tins of 410 g, or 387 ml. It is designed to be used with water, in the ratio of 1:1. One tin will produce 4 glasses of milk, with 3.75% fat content. Due to its easy dry storage, this milk is often used in making Frappe which is known sometimes as Greek coffee, especially economical for canteens.

Other varieties have included canned pineapple slices in light syrup sold in cans of ten and tinned tomatoes.

It is marketed by the Atlantic Supermarkets of Greece.
