= Frappé =

Frappé or frappe may refer to:

== Food and drink ==
- Frappé coffee, an iced coffee beverage made from instant coffee originally from Greece
- Frappe, a New England term for a milkshake with ice cream
- A drink similar to the trademarked Frappuccino
- Frappe, an Italian and Corsican name for angel wings, a sweet, crisp pastry made with deep-fried dough

== Other uses ==
- Force de dissuasion (formerly Force de frappe), the French Nuclear Force
- Glossary of ballet § Frappé
