= Dalgona =

Korean candy

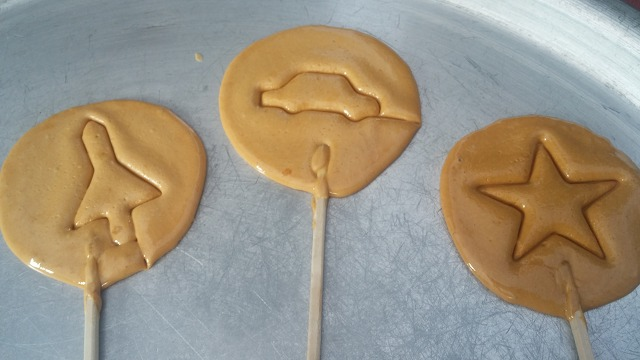
- Type: Sugar candy
- Place of origin: South Korea
- Associated cuisine: Korean
- Main ingredients: Sugar, baking soda
- Similar dishes: Honeycomb toffee

Korean name
- Hangul: 달고나
- RR: dalgona
- MR: talgona
- IPA: tal.ɡo.na

Alternate name
- Hangul: 뽑기
- RR: ppopgi
- MR: ppopki
- IPA: p͈op̚.k͈i

Dalgona (Korean: 달고나; pronounced [tal.ɡo.na]) or ppopgi (뽑기; [p͈op̚.k͈i]) is a candy made with melted sugar and baking soda originating in South Korea. It is a popular street snack from the 1960s and is still eaten as a retro food.

When a pinch of baking soda is mixed into melted sugar, the thermal decomposition of the baking soda releases carbon dioxide, which makes the liquidized sugar puff up and becomes a light and crunchy candy once cooled and hardened.

Typically, the creamy beige liquid is poured on a flat surface, pressed flat, and stamped using a cookie cutter imprinting an image on the candy such as a star or a heart. Consumers try to trim their way around the outline on the snack without breaking the picture as a challenge. Traditionally, if this trimming is completed without breaking the candy, the consumer receives another free dalgona from the seller.

Modern cafes in Korea serve novel dalgona coffee beverages where dalgona-flavoured coffee cream is heaped on top of iced tea or coffee, as well as pastries such as scones. Some cafes also used dalgona to make desserts such as bingsu and souffle.

Dalgona appeared in an episode of the Netflix series Squid Game, with a deadly version of the dalgona challenge being the second game played in the series. The success and international popularity of the show led to a revival of the candy's popularity in South Korea along with the rising prevalence around the world. Sales have doubled for dalgona street vendors as foreigners become more interested in the candy. People have also taken to social media such as TikTok and YouTube to make their own candy at home as a challenge and as a cooking recipe.

== Name ==
Dalgona was originally a term specific for expensive candies that use glucose which did not use a pattern, while ppopgi was originally candies that use sugar and thus could be easily molded into shapes such as stars and circles. Due to problems with dalgona regarding its susceptibility to getting moldy, the word dalgona began to refer to the same food as ppopgi. In the Gyeonggi Province, including Seoul and Incheon, it was mainly called dalgona and ppopgi, but the names vary from region to region.

- ttigi (띠기): Representatively, it was used in Daejeon, and other regions were used in most of Chungcheong Province except Cheongju and most of Jeolla Province except Gwangju. Ttigi reflects the characteristics of Chungcheong and Jeolla dialects in which the vowel e (ㅔ) is converted into i (ㅣ), and when changed to a standard language, it becomes ttegi (떼기).
- gukja (국자): It was mainly used in Daegu and North Gyeongsang Province, and it is said to have been called a gukja (ladle) because it was made and eaten in a ladle. In addition, it was also called pajjakkung (파짜꿍), but it is not as strong as a gukja.
- jjokja (쪽자): It was mainly used in the South Gyeongsang Province, and it is presumed to have originated from the dialect of the ladle, but it is not accurate.
- orittegi / orittigi (오리떼기/오리띠기): It was mainly used in Masan and is said to have originated from the dialect of "cutting" (오려; oryeo) and "pulling" (떼기; ttegi).
- ttong-gwaja (똥과자): In Busan, it is said that it was also called ttong-gwaja in addition to jjokja. As the name suggests, it was called ttong-gwaja (poop cookie) because it looked like a poop.
- ttegi (떼기): It is said that in Jeju Island, like Chungcheong and Jeolla, it was called ttegi by borrowing the standard language itself without transforming it into ttigi, a dialect form. Exceptionally, it is said that it was also called tikka (띠까) in some areas of Seogwipo.

== Gallery ==
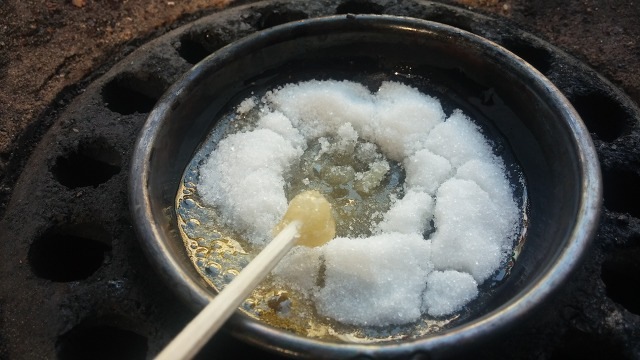
Making dalgona on yeontan (coal briquettes)

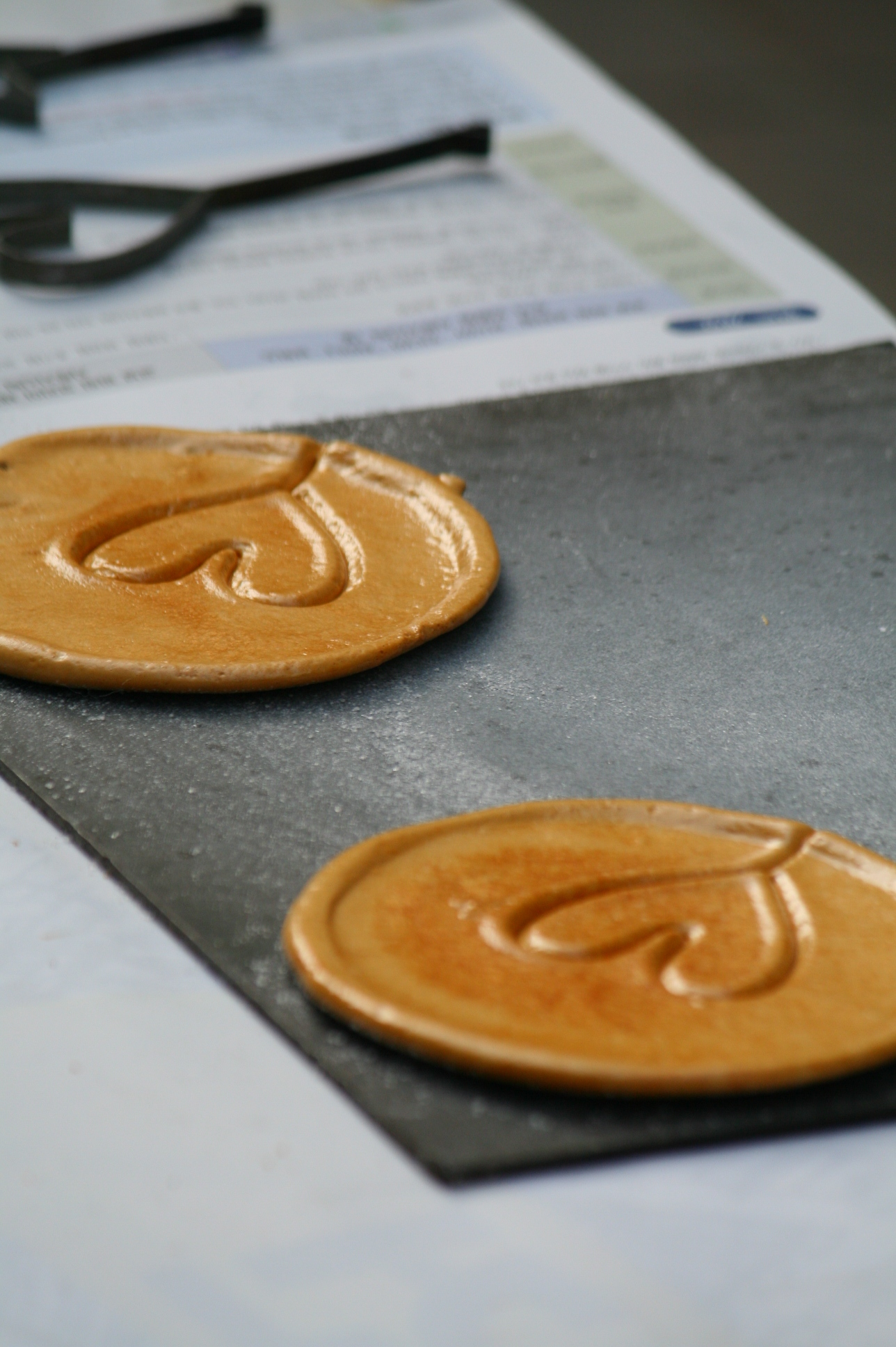
Dalgona

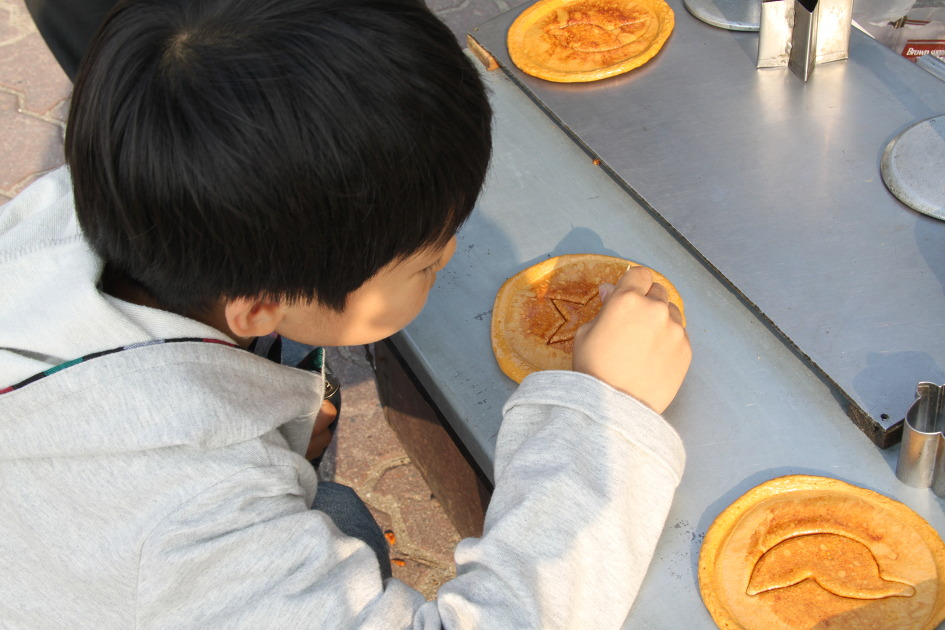
A child trying to poke a shape out of dalgona

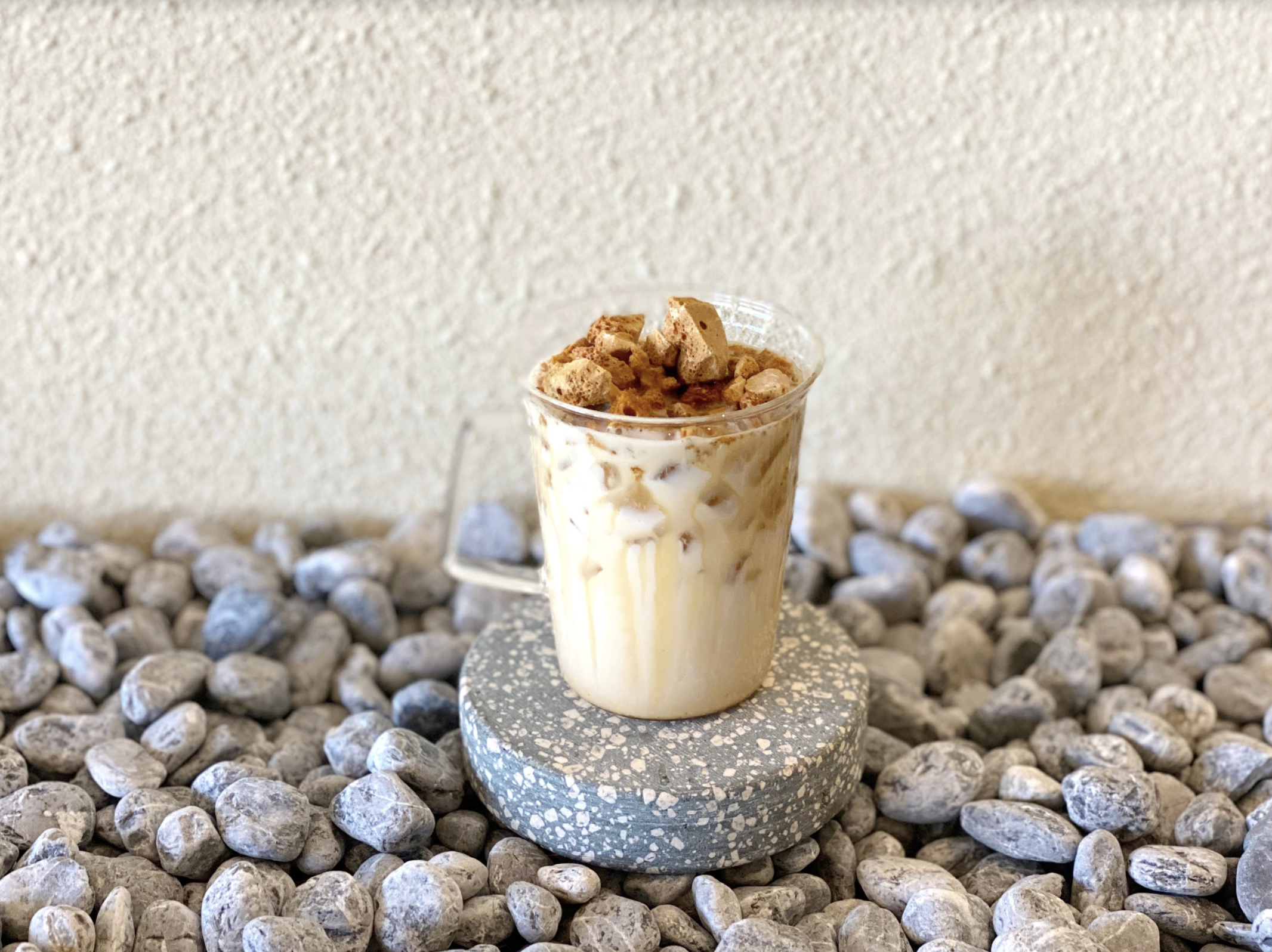
Dalgona-flavoured coffee cream on iced tea at a modern Seoul cafe

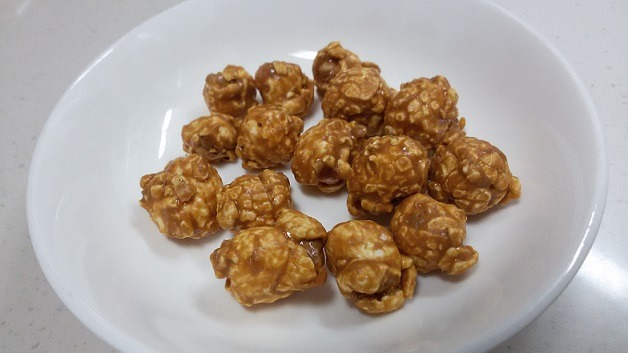
Dalgona-flavored popcorn

== See also ==
- Dalgona coffee
- Honeycomb toffee
- Katanuki
- Korean cuisine
- List of Korean desserts
- North Korean cuisine
- South Korean cuisine
- Street food in South Korea
