= Lewis Road Creamery =

New Zealand dairy company

- Founded: July 2012
- Headquarters: Auckland, New Zealand
- Products: Milk, butter, cream, ice cream, Flavoured milk
- Website: www.lewisroadcreamery.co.nz

Lewis Road Creamery is a boutique New Zealand dairy company, located in northern New Zealand. They produce a range of milk products, including varieties of milk, cream, ice cream and butter. The company is best known for its brand of chocolate milk, which in 2014 sparked a frenzied, nationwide shortage.

== History ==
During 2020 the company was sold to Southern Pastures. Southern Pastures already owned half of the company before buying the remaining shares in 2020. In April 2022 Ben Wheeler was appointed as General Manager of their New Zealand operations, wheeler was the 2021 NZ Marketer Of The Year. As part of Matariki celebrations the company launched a new limited-time product milk infused with Horopito. In 2016 Lewis Road Creamery partnered with OOB Organic to create a limited edition strawberry-flavoured milk.

== 2014 chocolate milk shortage ==
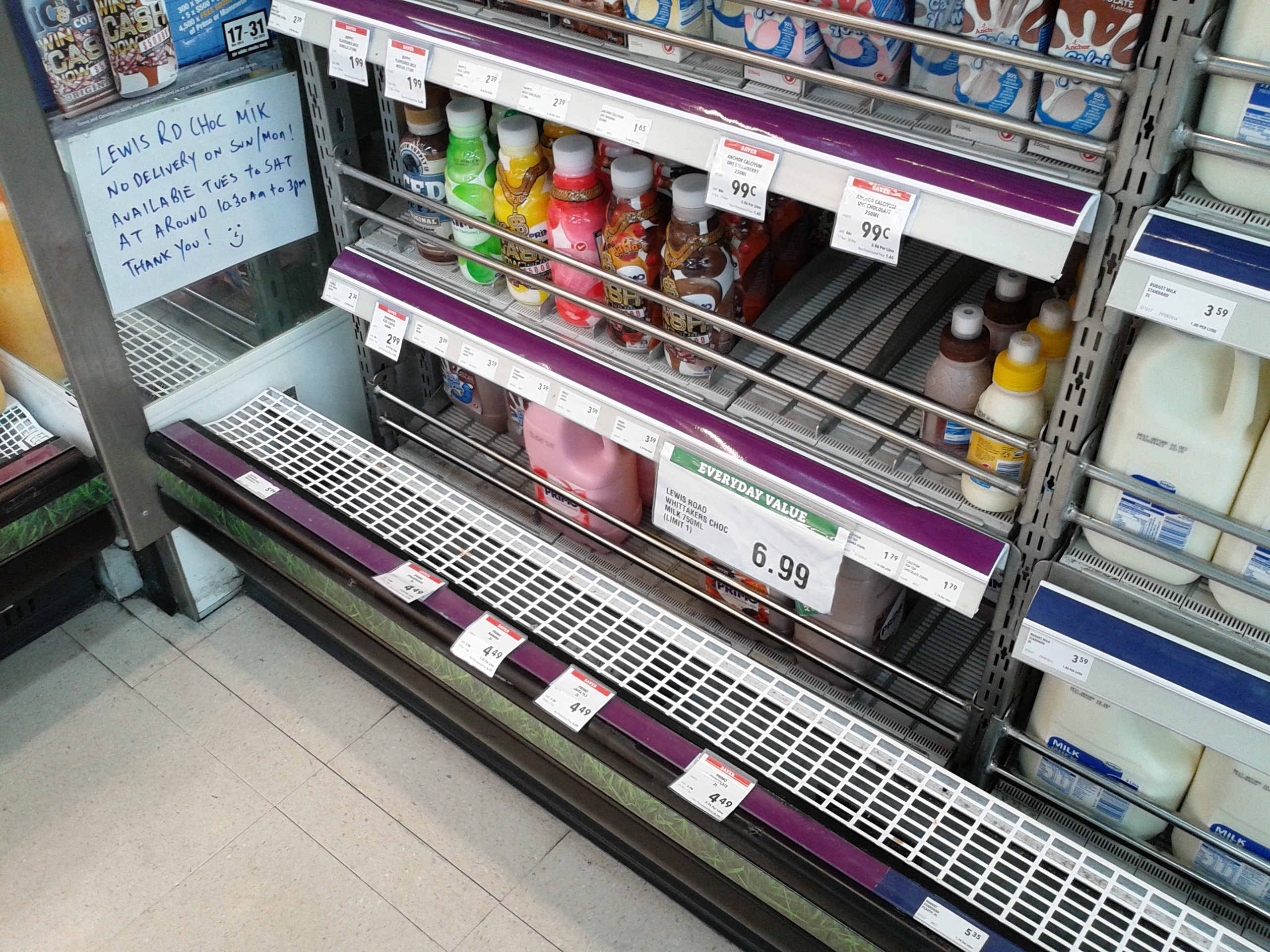
An apology note and an empty Lewis Road Creamery row at New World in 2014

In October 2014, Lewis Road Creamery in conjunction with Whittaker's Chocolate launched a new brand of chocolate milk. Initial production was staffed by around five people and totaled around 1000 liters, sold in 750ml and 300ml bottles. Reaction to its release was overwhelmingly positive, centering on its remarkable richness and creaminess. Due to its immense popularity and cult appeal, nationwide demand was greater than the quantity supplied, resulting in a shortage that often saw stores sell out of supplies before the end of the morning.

This shortage prompted local supermarkets and retailers to take extreme measures to secure stock and ensure fair purchasing. In some cases, rationing was implemented so as to limit the purchase to two bottles per person, and security guards were hired to monitor shoppers and fridges containing chocolate milk. The shortage also resulted in the emergence of chocolate milk black markets, ranging from scalpers attempting to resell bottles on TradeMe at three to four times their original price to counterfeit chocolate milk production.

Founder Peter Cullinane - formerly of Saatchi & Saatchi - insisted that they did not deliberately engineer the shortage as a marketing strategy. He claimed they were at first worried they couldn't sell the initial production of 1000 litres, but this worry turned out to be unfounded. He said they had a marketing budget of $60,000, but had to stop advertising after spending only a third of it because of unprecedented demand.
