= Caffè shakerato =

Italian iced espresso drink

- Alternative names: Shakerato
- Type: Iced coffee
- Place of origin: Italy
- Created by: Unknown
- Invented: c. 1990s
- Main ingredients: Espresso, ice, simple syrup or sugar
- Variations: Shakerato corretto (with liqueur), shakerato al cioccolato, shakerato con panna

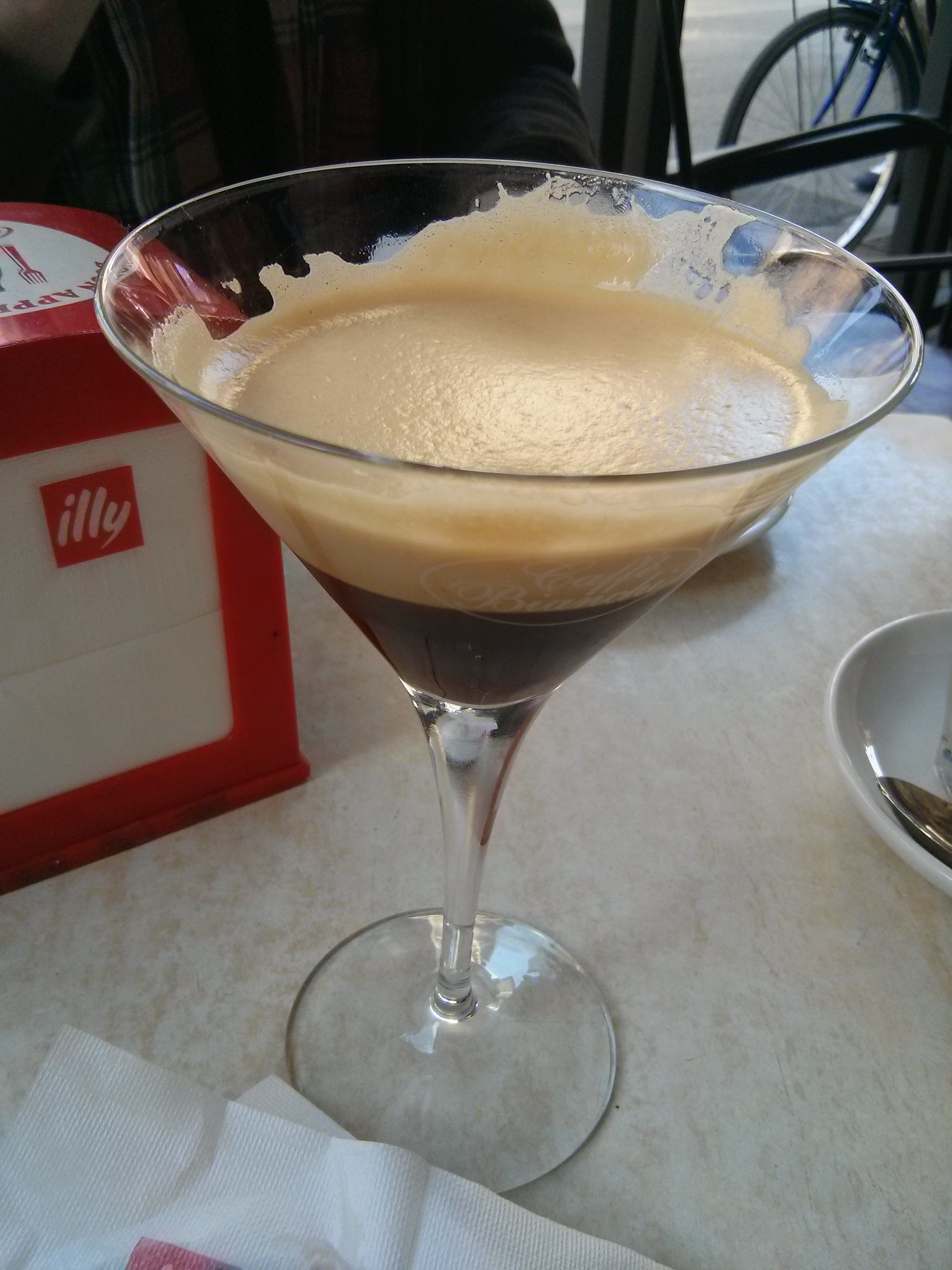
Shakerato in a martini glass, in Florence, Italy

A caffè shakerato (kafˈfɛ ʃekeˈraːto, Italian pronunciation: [ʃekeˈraːto], "shaken coffee"), commonly shortened to shakerato, is an Italian iced coffee drink prepared by vigorously shaking espresso with ice cubes and simple syrup or sugar in a cocktail shaker, then straining the mixture into a chilled glass. The result is a cold, frothy beverage with a layer of fine foam on top, typically served in a martini glass without ice.

The drink is ubiquitous in Italian cafés and bars during the summer months and is considered the country's characteristic warm-weather espresso preparation. Its name derives from the English verb "shake" with the Italian past-participle suffix -ato.

== History ==
The exact origins of the caffè shakerato are unknown, and no single inventor or precise date has been documented. Its emergence is generally attributed to Italian bartenders in the 1990s, as coffee shop culture was expanding rapidly across the country and worldwide.

The term shakerato first appeared in Italian print in 1966, in the publication Tempo presente, where it was used to describe a shaken cocktail rather than a coffee drink. Italian bartenders subsequently borrowed the vigorous shaking technique from aperitivo culture and applied it to espresso, creating a chilled, frothy coffee preparation suited to hot weather.

The drink's development was made possible by the intersection of two traditions already present in Italian bars: espresso preparation, which had become a daily urban ritual following the spread of lever-operated espresso machines after World War II, and cocktail mixing, since Italian cafés have long served double duty as both coffee houses and bars. The materials for both — espresso machines and cocktail shakers — were readily at hand behind the same counter, making the crossover natural.

Early adoption of the shakerato occurred primarily in northern Italian cities before spreading to Rome and southern regions during the 2000s. The drink gained broader international visibility in the 2010s through social media and coffee enthusiast culture, and experienced a further resurgence in the 2020s amid rising summer temperatures and growing global demand for cold coffee alternatives.

== Etymology ==
The word shakerato is a pseudo-Italian formation: the English verb "shake" with the Italian adjectival/participial suffix -ato (comparable to -ed in English). This loanword construction is characteristic of how Italian informally absorbs English terms, similar to other examples in Italian daily speech.

== Preparation ==
The shakerato is prepared by shaking together a shot of espresso with ice cubes in a cocktail shaker and simple syrup. Once a frothy consistency has been obtained it is strained into a glass. It is usually served in a martini glass. Sometimes, Baileys is added to give an alcoholic twist.

The classic caffè shakerato is made from three ingredients: freshly brewed espresso (typically a double shot), ice cubes, and a small amount of simple syrup or sugar.

The espresso is pulled and poured, still hot, directly into a cocktail shaker containing ice cubes and the sweetener. The shaker is closed and shaken vigorously for approximately 15–20 seconds. This rapid agitation serves several purposes: it chills the espresso almost instantly, dissolves the sugar, and — critically — aerates the liquid, stretching the espresso's natural crema into a tightly knit, stable foam. Espresso is technically a colloid — a solution containing solids in suspension — and during shaking, its natural oils trap air bubbles and emulsify them, producing the characteristic frothy head.

The mixture is then strained into a chilled glass, leaving the ice behind. This is one of the drink's defining features and a key distinction from most other iced coffee preparations: the shakerato is served without ice in the glass. It is typically presented in a martini glass or cocktail glass, giving it a visual resemblance to a cocktail — an association that is entirely deliberate.

Using full-sized ice cubes rather than crushed ice is important to prevent excessive dilution during shaking. Sugar or simple syrup, while technically optional, both adds sweetness and helps stabilise the foam.

== Presentation and ritual ==
In Italian coffeehouses, the preparation of a shakerato is a minor piece of theatre. Baristas — sometimes wearing bow ties in the more elegant establishments — vigorously shake the cocktail tumbler in a visible, deliberate motion before straining and presenting the drink across the bar in a single fluid sequence. This performative element is part of the drink's appeal in Italian café culture, blurring the line between barista and bartender.

This dual identity may partly explain why the shakerato has been slower to gain traction in other countries: preparing one requires a barista's full attention (much like a pour-over) and a skillset more associated with cocktail mixing than with the streamlined processes used in most coffee shops outside Italy.

== Variations ==
The classic shakerato is traditionally non-alcoholic, but several established variations exist in Italian bar culture:

- Shakerato corretto — a dash of liqueur such as amaretto, sambuca, grappa, or Baileys is added to the shaker before shaking. The term corretto ("corrected") follows the same convention as caffè corretto, the Italian tradition of "correcting" coffee with alcohol.
- Shakerato al cioccolato — cocoa powder is added to the hot espresso before shaking with ice, producing a mocha-like flavour profile while preserving the frothy texture.
- Shakerato con panna — topped with a dollop of whipped cream after straining.
- Shakerato macchiato — "stained" with a small amount of frothed milk or cold cream after straining, following the logic of the caffè macchiato.

Regional and seasonal variations may also incorporate flavoured syrups (vanilla, hazelnut), a twist of lemon zest, or a pinch of cocoa powder as garnish.

== Comparison with related drinks ==
The shakerato in context of other iced espresso preparations
Drink	Origin	Preparation	Served with ice	Milk
Caffè shakerato	Italy	Espresso shaken with ice, strained	No	No (classic)
Freddo espresso	Greece	Espresso blended/shaken with ice in spindle mixer	Yes (fresh ice in glass)	No (espresso variant)
Iced coffee (generic)	Various	Brewed coffee poured over ice	Yes	Optional
Espresso over ice	Various	Espresso poured directly over ice cubes	Yes	No
Espresso martini	United Kingdom	Espresso shaken with vodka, coffee liqueur, and ice	No	No

The shakerato is sometimes compared to the Greek freddo espresso, which uses a similar principle of shaking espresso with ice but differs in several respects: the freddo is typically made with a spindle drinks mixer rather than a cocktail shaker, is served over fresh ice in a tall glass, and produces a different foam texture. The two drinks appear to have developed independently in the 1990s, each reflecting local café equipment and customs.

== See also ==
- Caffè corretto
- Freddo espresso
- Frappé coffee
- Iced coffee
- Espresso martini
- Italian coffee
