= Jelly Tip =

New Zealand brand of ice cream

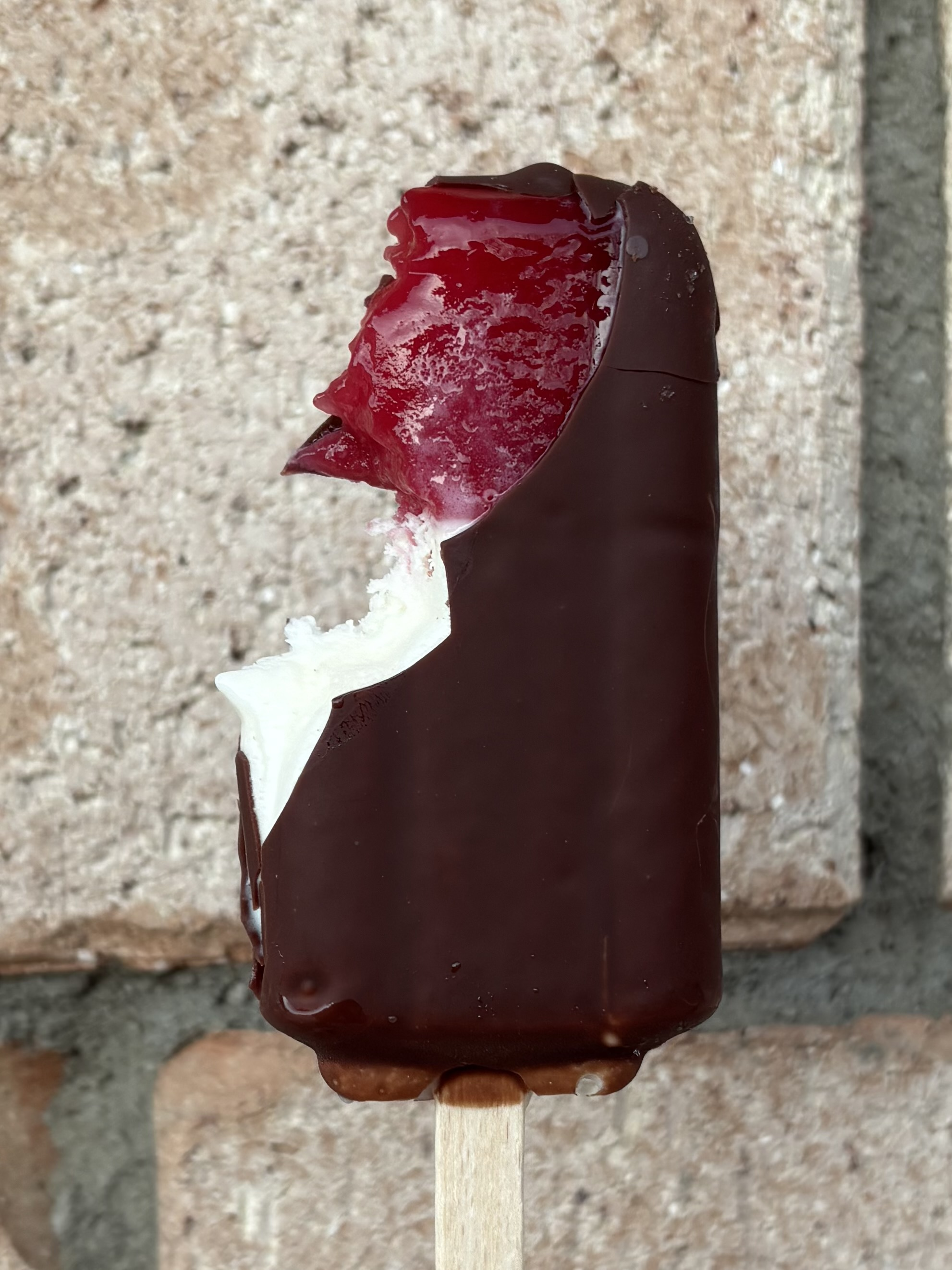
- Product type: Ice cream
- Current owner: Tip Top
- Produced by: Tip Top
- Country: New Zealand
- Introduced: 1951
- Website: www.tiptop.co.nz/favourites/jelly-tip

Jelly Tip is a New Zealand brand of ice cream made by Tip Top. It is an ice cream on a stick with a tip of jelly and coated with chocolate. Invented in 1951, it is estimated that over 150 million Jelly Tips have been sold until 2001. About four million Jelly Tips are made each year. The New Zealand Herald described it as Kiwiana.

== History ==
The Jelly Tip was invented by Tip Top in 1951, by people who were tasked with creating an ice cream for active children.

In 2011, the 75th anniversary of Tip Top, the company gave away 50,000 Jelly Tips.

In 2015 and 2021 Tip Top partnered with Griffin's Foods to create a limited edition Jelly Tip biscuit. In 2015 and 2016 there was a Whittaker's Jelly Tip chocolate block as a limited edition. It later became a permanent item and was made available in Australia in 2020. In 2015 there was a limited edition pavlova Jelly Tip, and a Squiggles Jelly Tip biscuit. In 2019 Tip Top and Primo created a Jelly Tip flavoured milk.

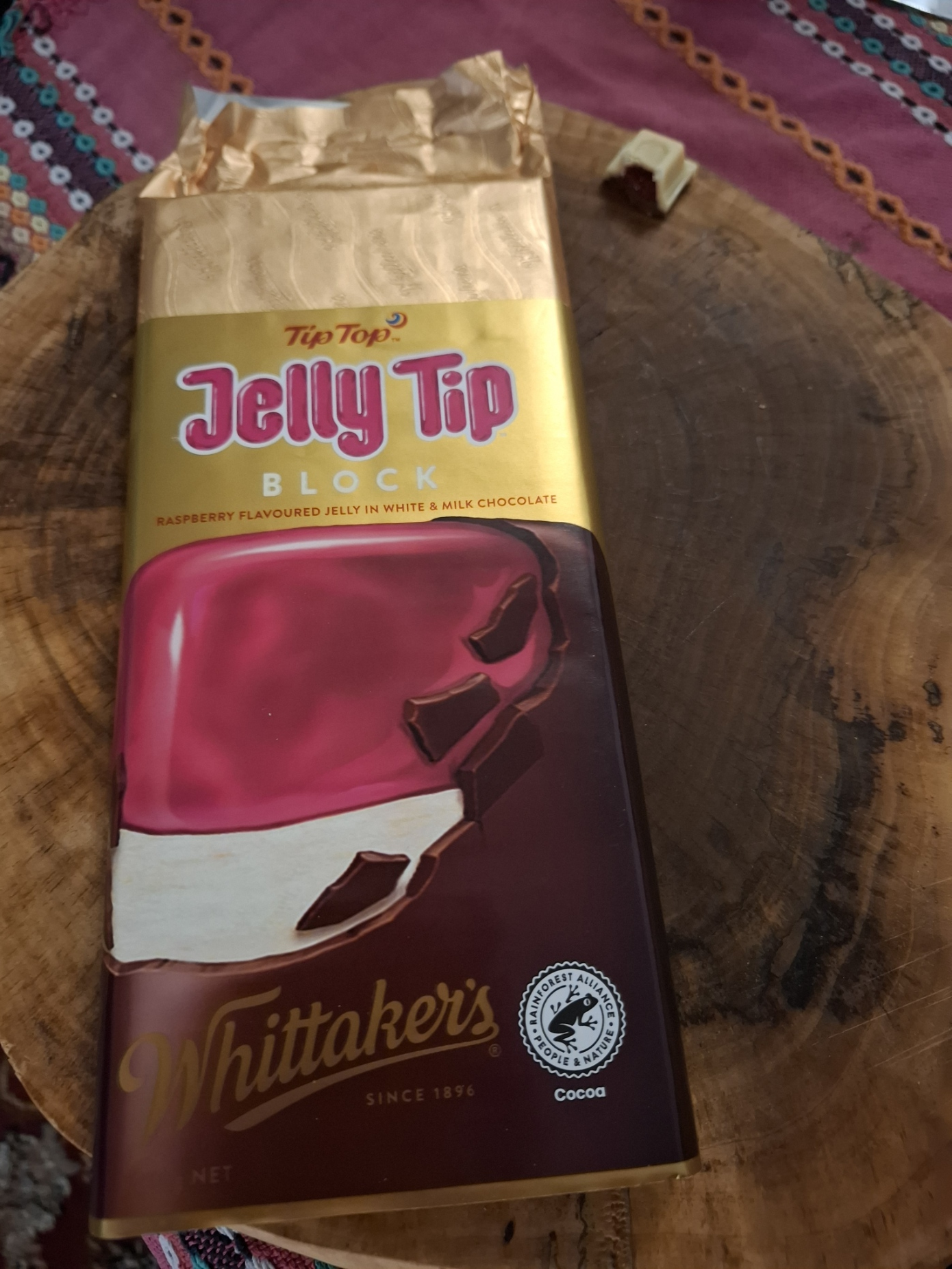
Whittaker's Jelly Tip chocolate block

== Manufacturing ==
To make a Jelly Tip, moulds are run through cold water and then jelly is put into the moulds, which is then frozen. Ice cream is then poured on top, and a stick is placed inside. After being taken out of the moulds, they are dipped in liquid chocolate, dried off, and then wrapped.

== Flavours and variations ==
- Jelly Tip Primo
- Pavlova
- Jelly Tip Squiggles biscuit
- Jelly Tip Trumpet (discontinued)
- Jelly Tip Whittaker's chocolate
