= Fruju =

Ice block brand

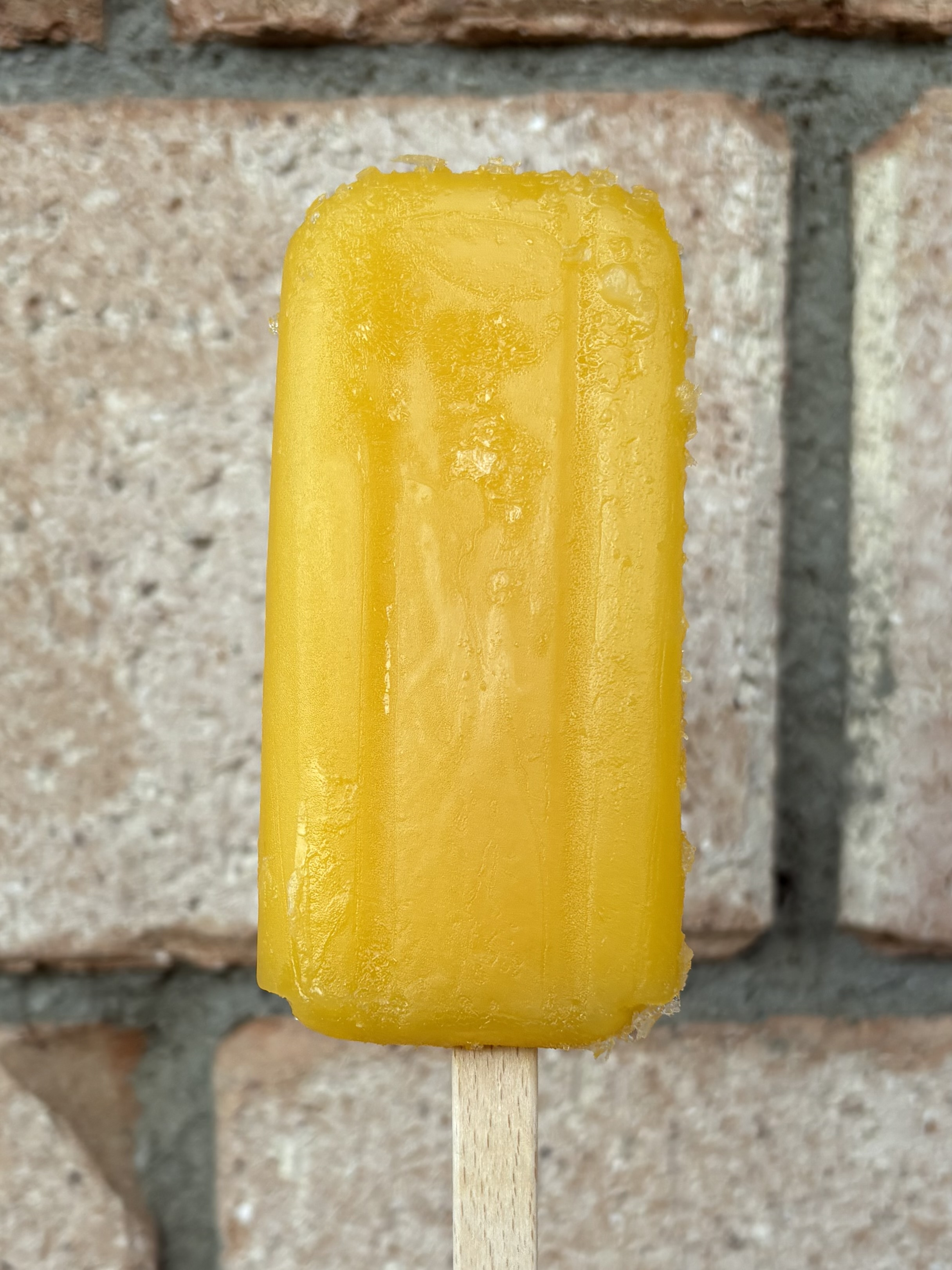
- Product type: Ice block
- Produced by: Tip Top
- Country: New Zealand
- Introduced: 1980s
- Website: Official website

Fruju is a New Zealand ice block brand manufactured by Tip Top. It stands for "fruit-juice".

== History ==
Fruju was started in the 1980s by Tip Top. The three following decades had television advertisements featuring the phrases "It's gonna hit ya" and "Ooh Aah".

In 1978 Fruju was mainly consumed by teenagers and young adults. To make the brand appealing to adults, the brand encouraged its staff to dip Frujus in gin.

The Pulp Fusion flavour was discontinued in the 2000s. In the summer of 2017 Tip Top partnered with Coca-Cola to create a Lemon & Paeroa flavour. In 2022 Fruju released the Mango Fruju. Due to limited freezer space, the Orange Rush flavour became unavailable on its own in shops except for supermarket multipacks. The discontinued flavour Tropical Snow has been brought back as a limited edition in 2014, 2017 and 2020. In late 2022 the Grapefruit & Lemon Fruju was discontinued. It was brought back in 2024 for a limited time.
