= Honeycomb toffee =

Type of sweet candy

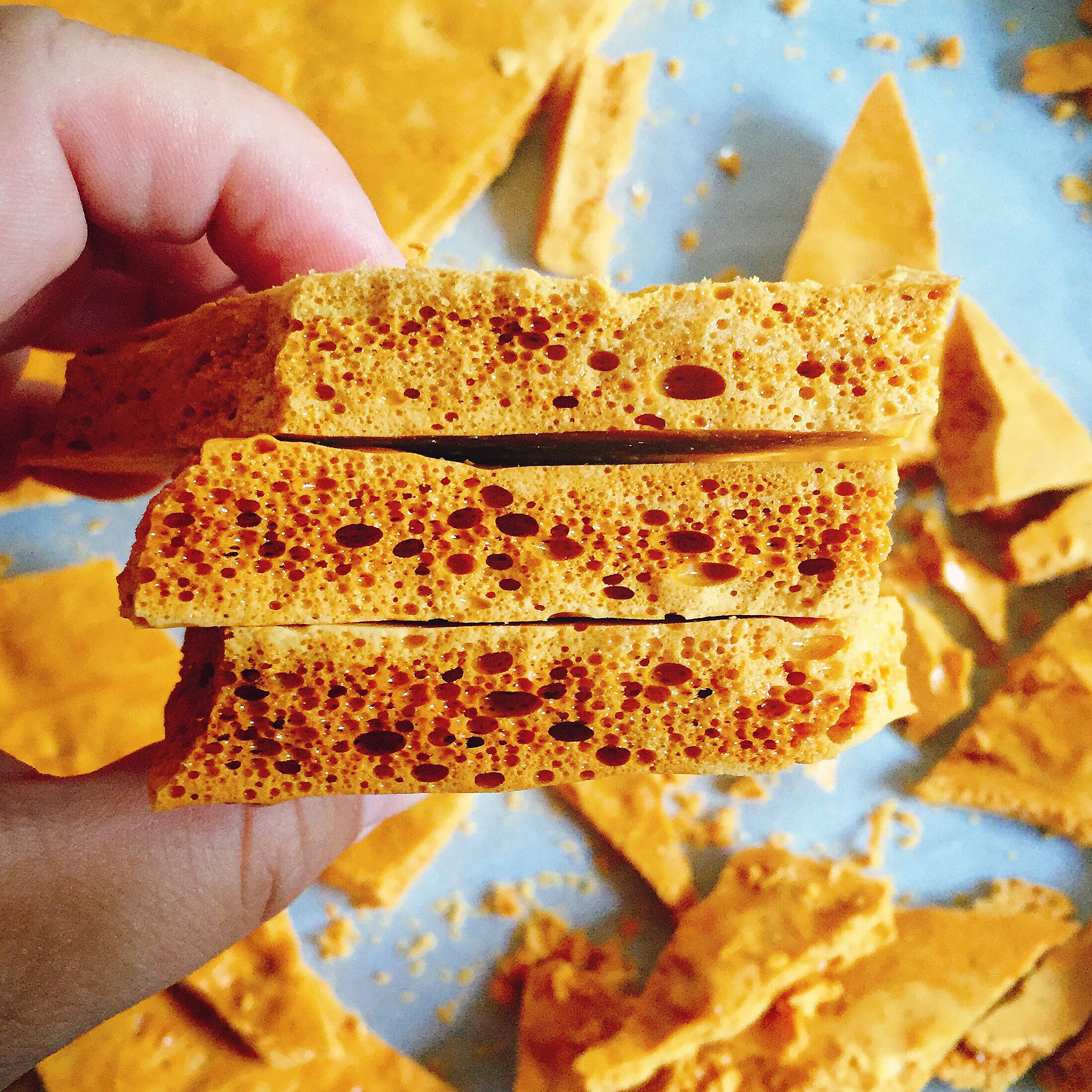
- Alternative names: Sponge candy, honeycomb candy, sponge toffee, cinder toffee, seafoam, golden crunchers, hokey pokey
- Type: Toffee
- Main ingredients: Brown sugar, corn syrup (or molasses or golden syrup), baking soda

Honeycomb toffee, honeycomb candy, sponge toffee, cinder toffee, seafoam, or hokey pokey is a sugary toffee with a light, rigid, sponge-like texture. Its main ingredients are typically brown sugar (or corn syrup, molasses or golden syrup) and baking soda, sometimes with an acid such as vinegar. The baking soda and acid react to form carbon dioxide which is trapped in the highly viscous mixture. When acid is not used, thermal decomposition of the baking soda releases carbon dioxide. The sponge-like structure is formed while the sugar is liquid, then the toffee sets hard. The candy goes by a variety of names and regional variants.

Owing to its relatively simple recipe and quick preparation time, in some regions it is often made at home, and is a popular recipe for children. It is also made commercially and sold in small blocks, or covered in chocolate, a popular example being the Crunchie bar of Britain and Canada, or the Violet Crumble of Australia.

== Regional names ==
Honeycomb toffee is known by a wide variety of names including:

- cinder toffee in Britain. Cinder toffee is a variant of honeycomb, created by cooking the sugar longer and often using specific traditional ingredients like golden syrup to produce a richer, more robustly caramelized flavor and a rustic, crunchy-and-chewy texture.
- fairy food candy or angel food candy in Wisconsin
- hokey pokey in New Zealand
- honeycomb in South Africa, Australia, Britain, Ireland, Philippines, and Ohio, United States
- old fashioned puff in Massachusetts
- puff candy in Scotland
- sponge candy in Milwaukee, Wisconsin, St. Paul, Minnesota, Northwest Pennsylvania, and Western New York is typically covered in chocolate.
- sponge toffee ("tire éponge") in Canada
- Turkish honey ("törökméz") in Hungary

== In various cultures ==
=== China ===
In China, it is called fēngwōtáng (蜂窩糖; "honeycomb candy"). It is said to be a popular type of confectionery enjoyed during childhood of the post-80s.

=== Hungary ===
In Hungary, it is known as törökméz (Turkish honey) and is commonly sold at town fairs.

=== Japan ===
The same confection is a traditional sweet in Japan known as karumeyaki (カルメ焼き), a portmanteau of the Portuguese word caramelo (caramel) and the Japanese word yaki (to bake), and thus can be roughly translated into English as "baked caramel" or '"grilled caramel." It is typically hand-made, and often sold by street vendors.

In Japan, raw egg whites are mixed with the baking soda to make the final product have a puffed up, dome shape.

=== South Korea ===
Dalgona (달고나) is a Korean candy made with melted sugar and baking soda. It was a popular street snack in the 1970s and 1980s, and is still eaten as a retro food.

=== New Zealand ===
Honeycomb toffee is known as hokey pokey (especially in the Kiwi classic Hokey Pokey ice cream) in New Zealand. A very popular ice-cream flavour consisting of plain vanilla ice cream with small, solid lumps of honeycomb toffee is also known as hokey pokey. It is also used to make hokey pokey biscuits.

=== Taiwan ===
In Taiwan, it is called swollen sugar (膨糖, péngtáng or 椪糖, pèngtáng).

== Gallery ==
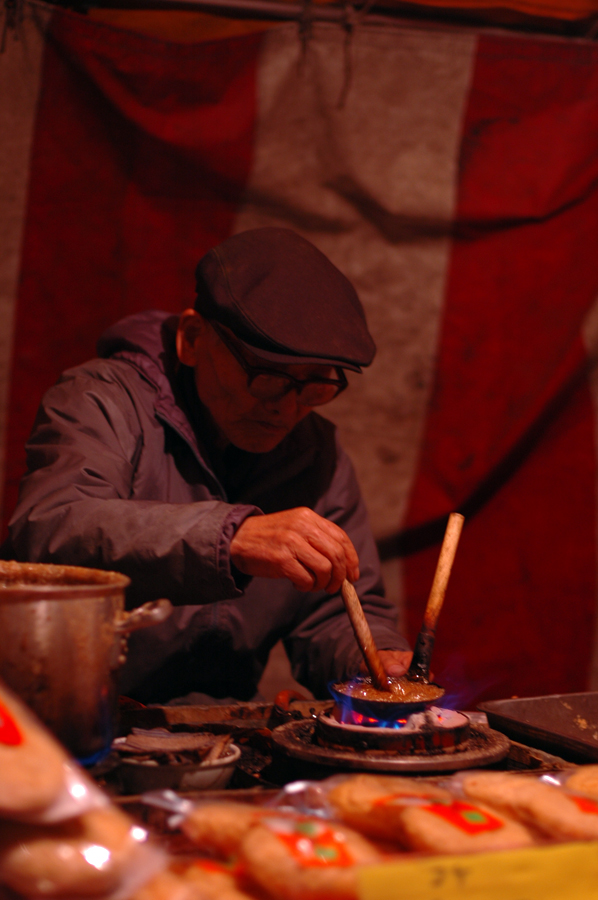
A street seller in Asakusa Tokyo offering hand-made karumeyaki

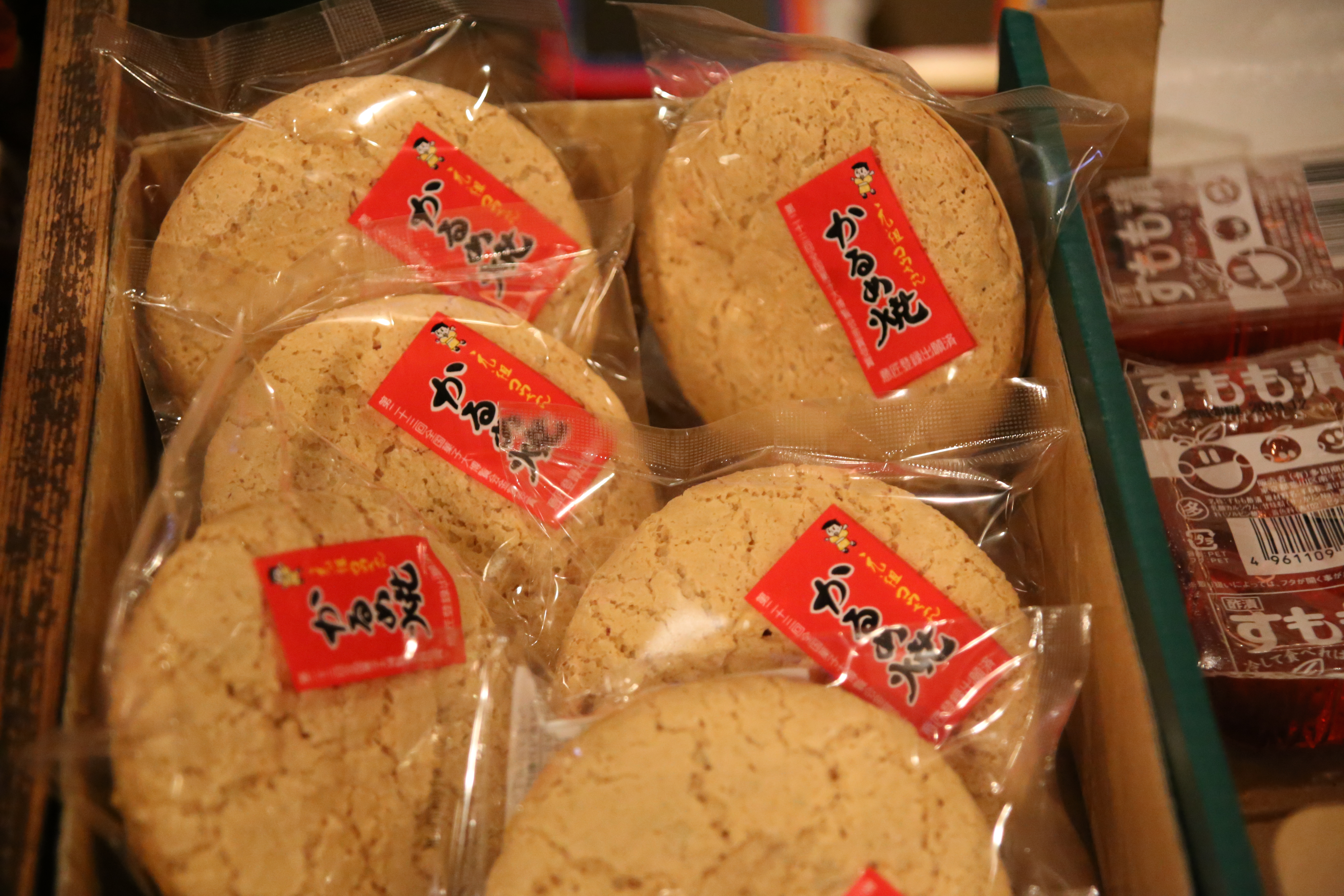
Packaged karumeyaki for sale in Japan

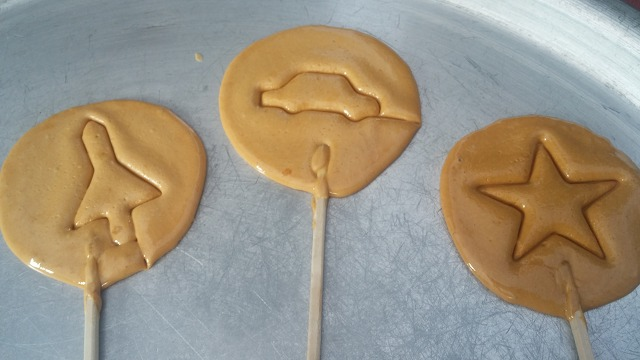
Dalgona

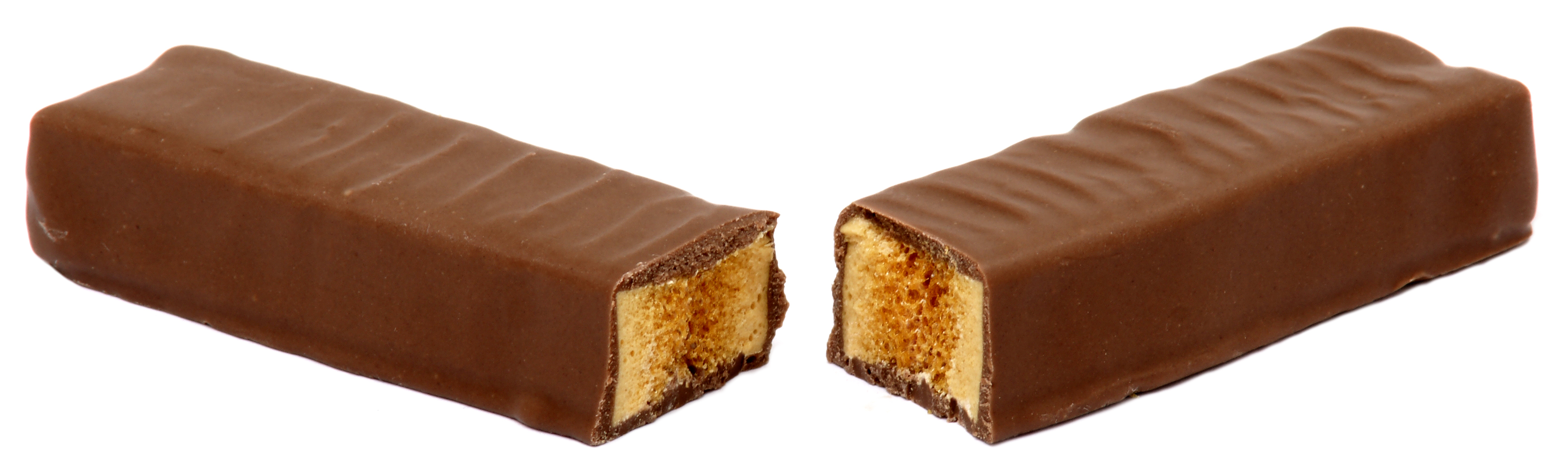
A Crunchie chocolate bar split open to reveal the honeycomb toffee inside

== See also ==
- Dalgona
- Hokey pokey
- Yellowman
- Toffee
- List of candies
