= Milk frother =

Utensil

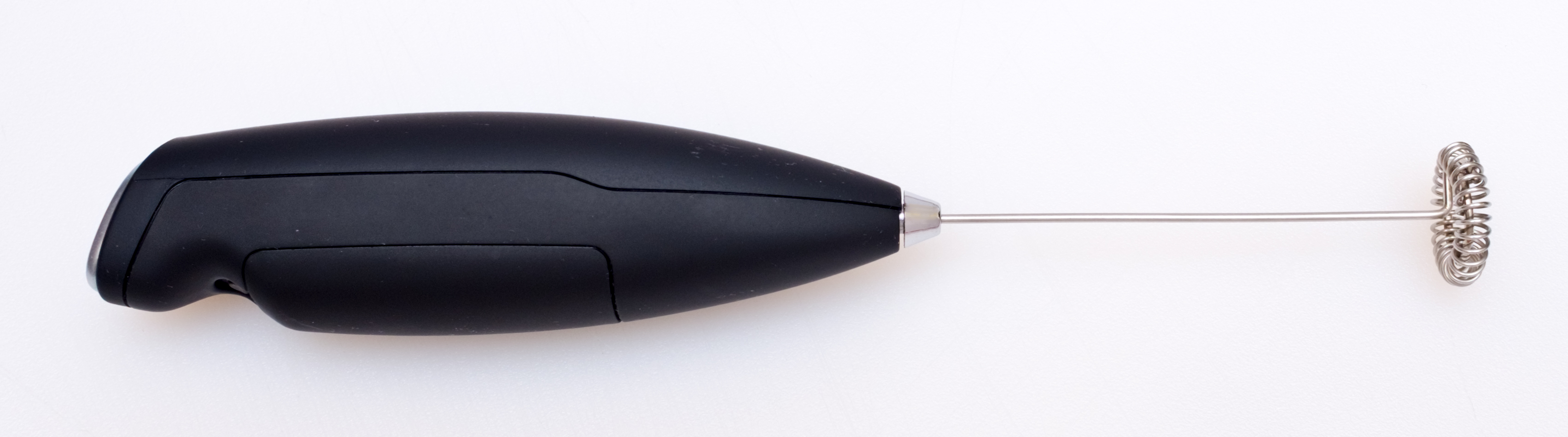
A battery powered milk frother wand

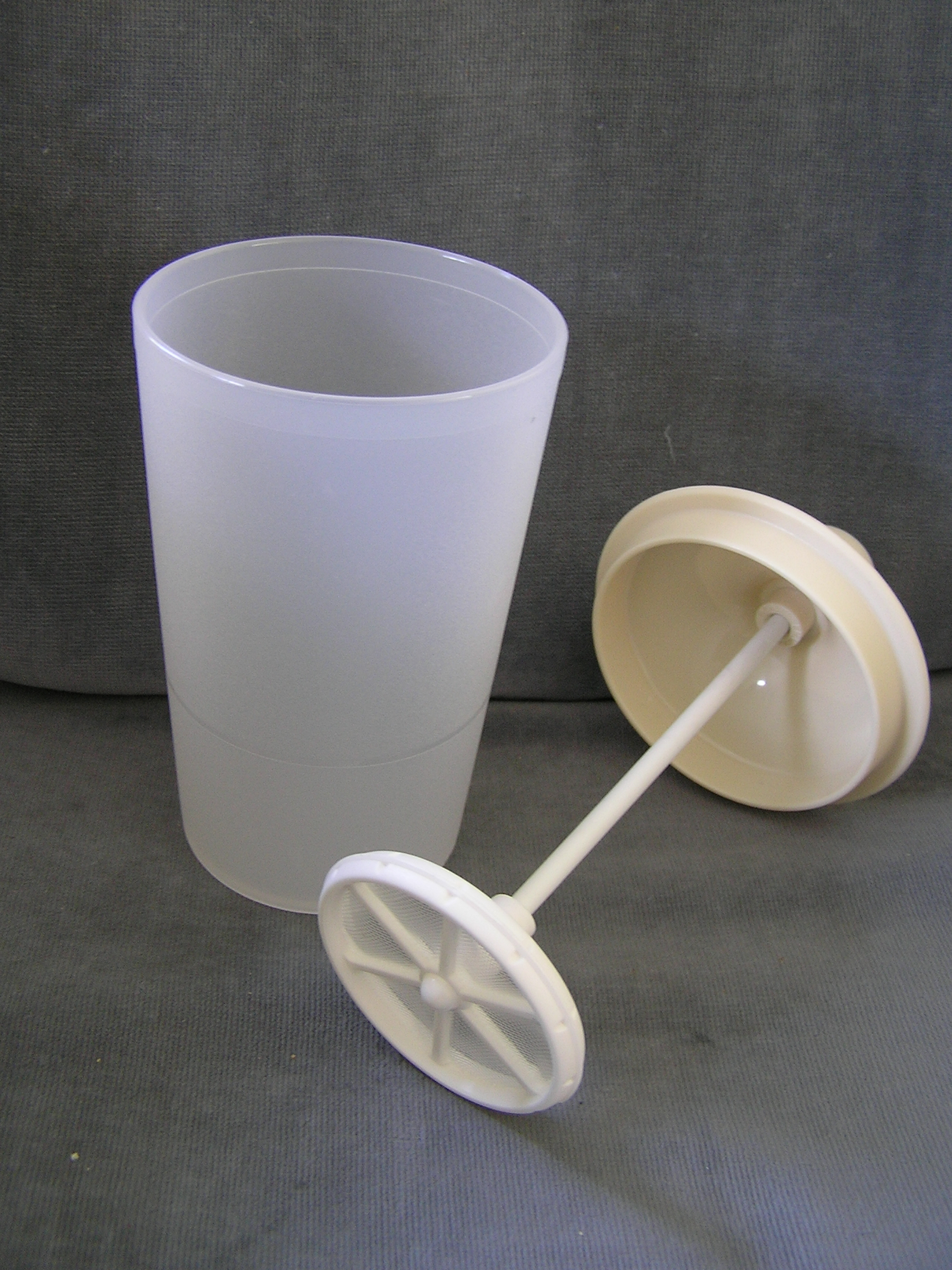
Plunger type milk frother

Use of a milk frother (handheld electric)

A milk frother is a utensil for making milk froth, typically to be added to coffee (cappuccino, latte, etc.). It aerates the milk, creating a thick but light foam. Milk frothers were introduced through the use of espresso machines that contained steamed wands that would froth steamed milk. Although created in Italy, the espresso machine and steam wands were exported internationally to other countries, and frothed milk was introduced around the world.

The tiny bubbles, which are formed during the aeration process of milk frothing, make the milk texture lighter and increase its volume. The air from milk frothers combined with the chemical properties in milk create the foamy texture of frothed milk. Milks with different protein and fat contents produce different types of foam. There are various types of milk foams based on the type of milk used in the process, and all yield different tastes and textures. There are three major types of milk frother: manual, handheld electric, and automatic. All devices create milk froth by introducing air bubbles into the milk.

== History ==
In the 1950s, espresso machines that were once native to Italy and their production of coffee were exported overseas to Mediterranean and British markets. There, the espresso based coffee drink "cappuccino" became more popular. Cappuccinos incorporated the use of frothed milk made through the steaming properties of espresso machines. Espresso machines contain a steam wand that heats milk and adds air to create the frothed milk that sits on top of cappuccinos. Cappuccinos became widely popular in Britain because of the exotic nature of milk froth and the technology used to make it.

In the US, coffee drinking shifted from the use of brewed coffee, which was beginning to decline, to specialty coffees. In 1982, the Specialty Coffee Association of America promoted the increased use of espresso machines and Italian premium coffee. Artisan baristas began making elaborate drinks such as the caffè latte and cappuccinos that incorporated the use of the steaming wand to both steam and froth milk.

== Process ==
Frothing milk involves a process that introduces air into the chemical properties of milk to create the light and airy product of frothed or foamed milk. Milk is made up of proteins, fats, and carbohydrates. The fats and proteins determine the thickness and the flavor of the foam. Milk that contains a heavier amount of fats and protein, such as whole milk, will produce a richer and thicker texture. Contrastingly, frothing skim milk, which has significantly less amounts of fats and protein, will produce a lighter and thinner foam. The protein properties in milk are what create the foamy texture in frothed milk. Casein molecules (a type of protein) form the molecular structure micelle, which get broken up when air from a milk frother is introduced. The casein molecules gravitate to the air bubbles trapping the air and creating foam.

== Types ==
=== Manual ===
A manual frother consists of a perforated mesh plunger in a cylinder, similar to a French press, which is moved up and down by hand. It takes 10–20 seconds to double the volume of milk. The cup may have a narrow spout for making foam art. They can also be used as French presses for making tea or coffee.

=== Handheld electric ===
A battery-powered milk frother wand is an electric mixer with a small, circular whisk. It froths the milk by spinning the whisk. It can also beat eggs or whipping cream in small quantities. When the device is turned on, the whisk creates a vortex and injects air into the liquid. The device is operated until the milk reaches the desired consistency.

=== Automatic ===
Automatic frothers run on mains electricity and provide a hands-free operation. They include a carafe, a power base, and a frothing disk. Most models are equipped with induction heating to warm the liquid. They operate with a press of a button and switch off automatically. Electric frothers are fast and provide high-quality foam, and may have large enough capacity to prepare multiple beverages.
