= Beaten coffee =

Indian coffee beverage

Beaten coffee or phenti hui coffee or phitti hui coffee (transl. stirred coffee) is an Indian home-style coffee beverage made mostly with instant coffee and sugar. It is known as 'beaten' as the process involves beating the coffee and sugar together with a spoon to aerate into a light brown fluffy paste-like substance. It is generally served with warm milk, which creates a thick froth on the top. Another popular way of serving it is by pouring the paste on top of a cup of warm or cold milk. Beaten coffee can be prepared without any special machines or coffee mixes. Coffee is beaten with milk, hot water, and sugar, incorporating air into the paste until frothy. As milk is added, the coffee is further dissolved and air is released creating a creamy texture.

== Similar drinks ==
The coffee beverage is similar to the frappé coffee (or Greek frappe or Nescafé frappe or φραπέ) originating in Greece in 1957, which is either hand shaken or whipped with a frothing mixer and is traditionally served cold but also may be prepared hot.
