= Frappé coffee =

Greek iced coffee drink

Frappé
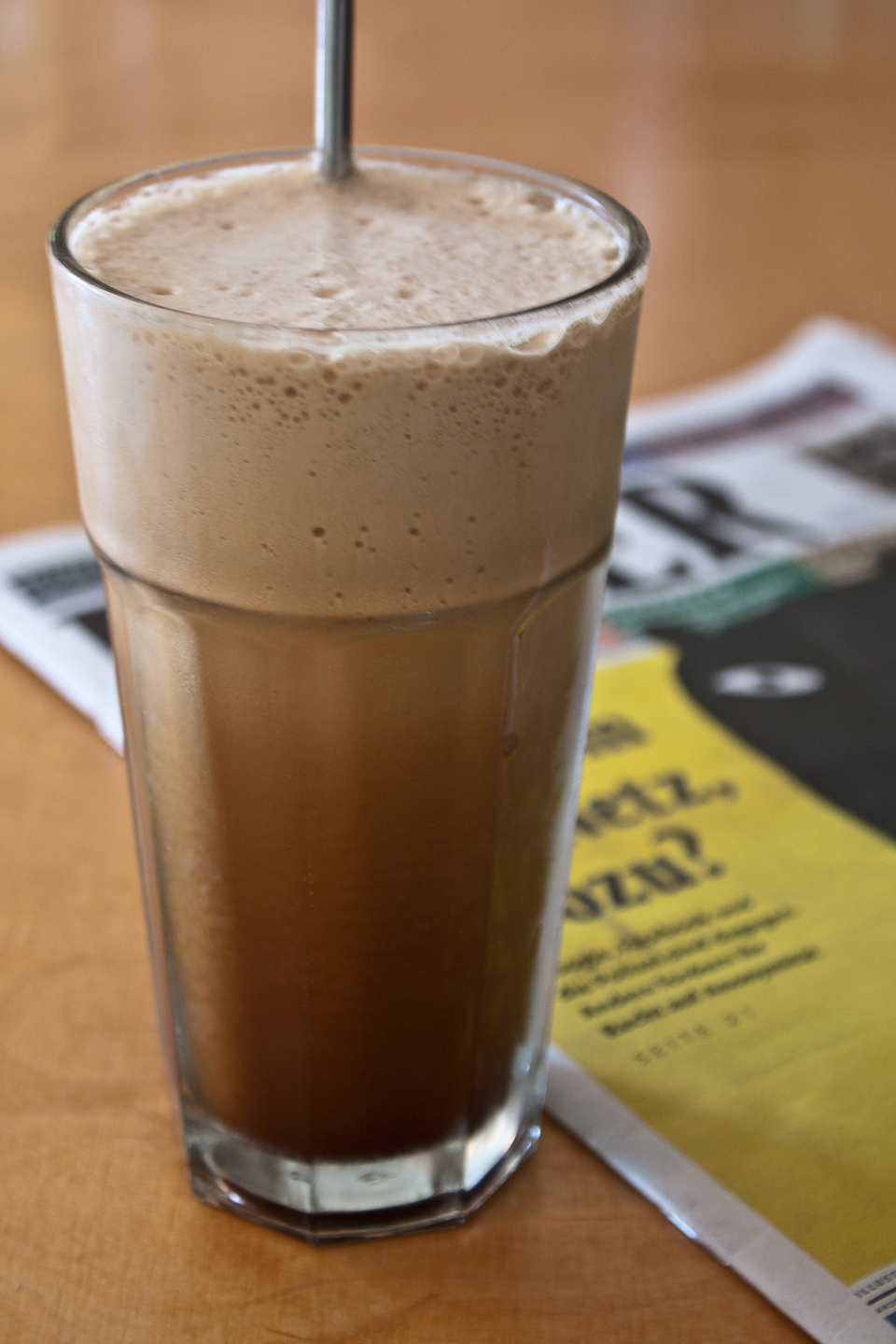
- Classic frappé with no milk
- Type: Iced coffee
- Place of origin: Greece
- Created by: Dimitris Vakondios (Δημήτρης Βακόνδιος)
- Invented: September 1957
- Main ingredients: Instant coffee, sugar, milk, water

A frappé coffee, cold coffee, Greek frappé, or just frappé (Greek: φραπέ, frapé [fraˈpe]) is a Greek iced coffee drink generally made from spray-dried instant coffee, water, sugar, ice and milk. The word is often written frappe (without an accent). The frappé was invented in 1957 in Thessaloniki through experimentation by Dimitris Vakondios, a Nescafe representative. Greek Christos Lenzos (1930–2023), a coffeehouse (1964–2013) owner in Pangrati, has been recognized for his self-made version of Greek frappé coffee. Frappés are among the most popular forms of coffee in Greece and Cyprus and have become a hallmark of postwar outdoor Greek coffee culture.

== History ==
The name frappé ('hit', figuratively 'shaken') comes from French, and describes drinks chilled with ice. Beginning in the 19th century, a variety of cold coffee drinks named café frappé (à la glace) are documented, some similar to slushies and others more like iced coffee.

It has been said that the Greek version of café frappé, using instant coffee, was invented in 1957 at the Thessaloniki International Fair. A representative of the Nestlé company, Giannis Dritsas, was exhibiting a new product for children. It was a chocolate beverage produced instantly by mixing it with milk and shaking it in a shaker. Dritsas' employee, Dimitris Vakondios, was looking for a way to have his usual instant coffee during his break but could not find any hot water, so, he mixed the coffee with cold water and ice cubes in a shaker.

Nikos Bakounakis was the first to express doubts about this story in 2006, and further evidence was later presented by the magazine Gastronomos in 2013. Based on Nestlé’s newspaper advertisements from the period leading up to the 1957 Thessaloniki International Trade Fair, it appears that the product was already being promoted as "Nescafé frappe", either as coffee with ice cubes or as an iced shaken—as suggested by its name (frappé = shaken)—or stirred drink. Furthermore, in the 1951 film Προ παντός ψυχραιμία (Pro pantós psykhaimía, Above all, stay calm) starring Mimis Fotopoulos and Dinos Iliopoulos, Iliopoulos makes a direct reference to frappé coffee, which the two protagonists prepared with a shaker at Pavlidis Patisserie on Amerikis Square in Athens: "If we make even the slightest mistake, they’ll turn us into a frappé!".

Vakondios' improvised experiment is thought to have established the frappé which quickly grew in popularity in Greece. Nestlé capitalized on the drink with intense marketing campaigns in the 1980s that broadened the drink's popularity and left the brand name Nescafé inextricably linked with the frappé. Today, the drink is usually simply called a 'frappé' in Greece, but in the past, it was often called a 'Nescafé frappé'.

== Preparation ==
A frappé can be made with a cocktail shaker or, more commonly today, with an electric milk frother or milkshake machine. First, instant coffee (traditionally Nescafé), sugar (optional), and a little water are shaken or blended together until a thick foam is made. This is then poured into the serving glass with ice cubes and cold water. Milk (traditionally evaporated milk or sometimes condensed milk) is optionally added to it. The drink is almost always served with a drinking straw as the thick foam formed on top is considered unpleasantly bitter by many.

== Frothy top ==
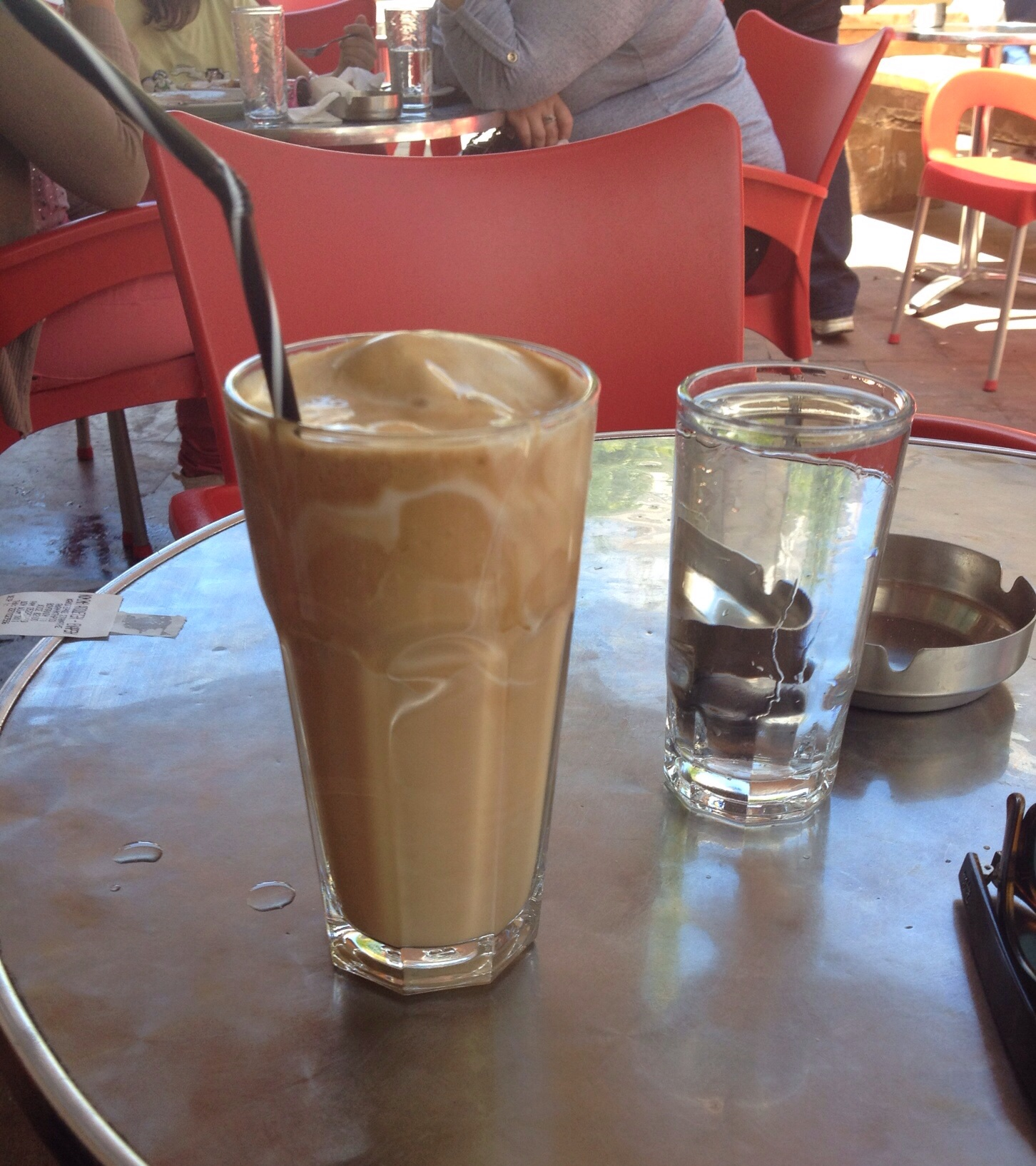
A frappé with milk

The spray-dried instant coffee used to make a frappé contains nearly no oil; this allows the frappé's characteristically thick layer of foam to form. Frappé foam is similar to crema, the foam found in espresso, but thicker and longer-lasting due to its oilless composition. It is a three-phase colloid of air bubbles, coffee solids, and water. Depending on the initial size of the foam's bubbles and the frappé's sugar content, water drains from the foam over the course of 2–10 minutes. It will thicken until it forms a nearly solid foam, which then slowly dissipates. Frappés made with freshly brewed coffee or freeze-dried instant coffee, both of which contain significantly more oils than spray-dried instant coffee, produce only short-lived foams. Moreover, the method of preparing the frappé can impact the bubbles on top of the coffee. For example, making a frappé by using a handheld shaker produces finer, longer lasting, and more stable bubbles.

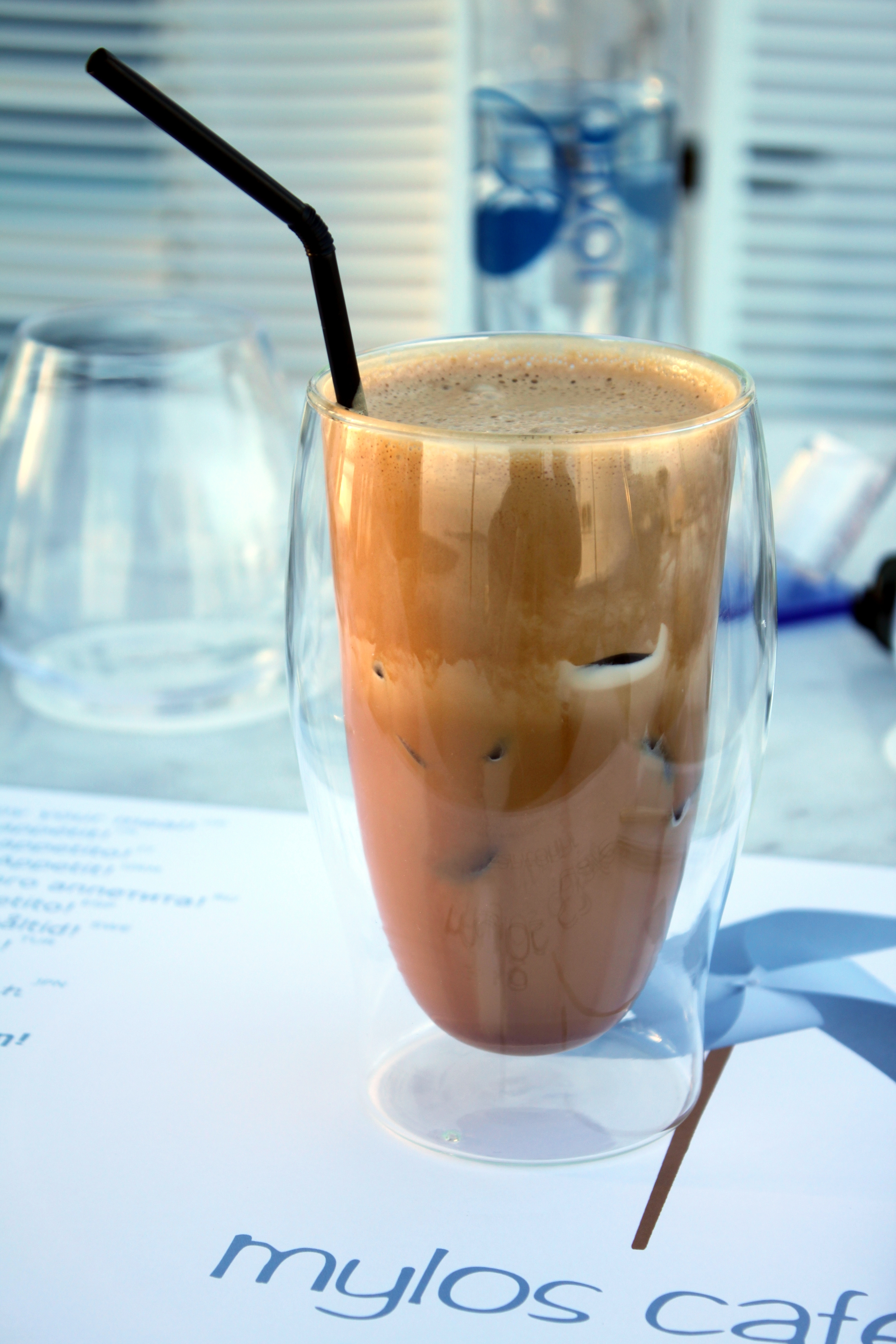
A frappé coffee

== Terminology and variations ==
In Greece, a frappé is generally ordered by specifying sweetness and the option to add milk. For 2 spoonfuls of coffee, the usual sweetness levels are the following:

- glykós (γλυκός [ɣliˈkos] 'sweet') – 4 spoonfuls sugar
- métrios (μέτριος [ˈme.tri.os] 'medium') – 2 spoonfuls sugar
- skétos (σκέτος [ˈsce.tos] 'plain') – no sugar

Milk, usually evaporated milk, is generally not added unless explicitly requested by using the phrase me gála (με γάλα [me ˈɣala] 'with milk'); likewise, it can be explicitly requested without milk by saying horís gála (χωρίς γάλα [xoˈris ˈɣala], 'without milk').

A frappé with milk is occasionally called frapógalo (φραπόγαλο [fraˈpoɣalo] 'frappé-milk'). Sometimes, particularly in Cyprus, frappés are made with milk instead of water (besides the water used in the foam). At some establishments, particularly beach bars, alcoholic liqueurs such as Kahlúa or Baileys Irish Cream are added to frappés. Other restaurants offer adding a ball of vanilla ice cream to a frappé instead of milk. Though not technically frappés (since they are not shaken), some variations are stirred with a spoon when a shaker is not available and this creates a different texture and taste. These variations are generally referred to as koutalátos (κουταλάτος [kutaˈlatos], lit. 'spoon-made') or karavísios (καραβίσιος [karaˈvisios], lit. 'of the ship') because of their association with sailors at sea.

=== Freddo espresso and freddo cappuccino ===
The freddo espresso is a Greek iced espresso which was first made in Athens in 1991 and has grown in popularity since. It is often seen as a "higher quality frappé". The freddo cappuccino is a freddo espresso topped with a cold milk-based foam called afrógala (Greek: αφρόγαλα).

=== Outside Greece ===
Although frappés are commonly associated with Greece, their popularity has grown in other nations in the recent years. Frappés first became broadly known outside of Greece during the 2004 Summer Olympics in Athens, wherein many tourists became fond of them and an article was published in the Los Angeles Times. Immigrants and tourists in Greece have also helped to take the frappé abroad.

== See also ==
- Beaten coffee – Indian coffee beverage
- Caffè crema – Coffee drink
- Dalgona coffee – Whipped coffee drink
- Frappe (New England) – Cold dairy beverage
- Frappuccino – Starbucks iced coffee drink
- Caffè shakerato – Italian iced espresso drink

== Bibliography ==
- Constantinopoulos, Vivian; Young, Daniel (2008). Frappé Nation. Athens: Editions Potamos. ISBN 978-9606691010.
