= Hokey pokey (ice cream) =

Ice cream flavour of New Zealand

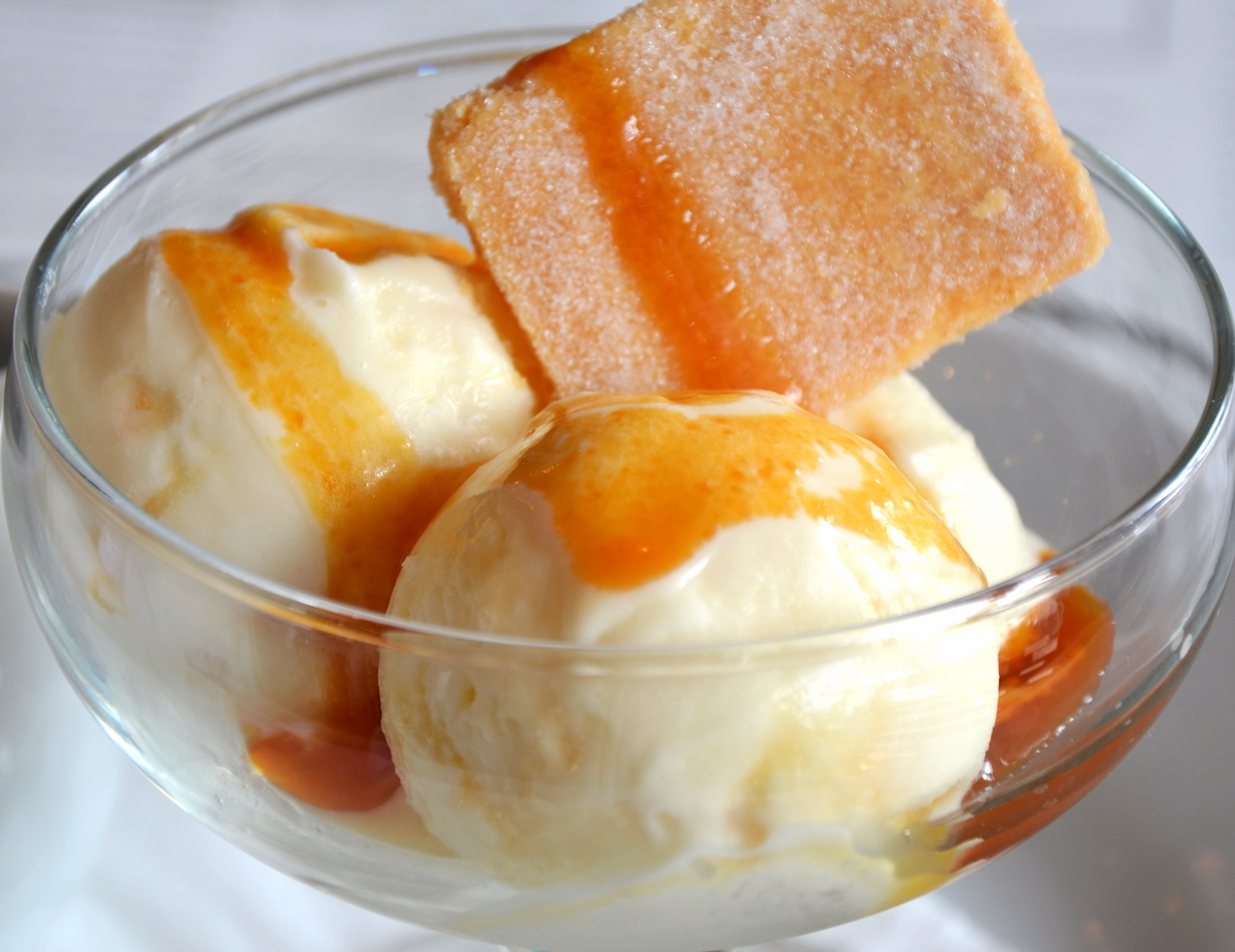
- Honeycomb ice cream with toffee and sauce
- Type: Ice cream
- Course: Dessert
- Place of origin: New Zealand
- Region or state: Dunedin, Otago
- Main ingredients: Vanilla ice cream and honeycomb toffee

Hokey pokey is a flavour of ice cream in New Zealand and Australia consisting of plain vanilla ice cream with small, solid lumps of honeycomb toffee. Hokey pokey is the New Zealand term for honeycomb toffee. The original recipe until around 1980 consisted of solid toffee, but in a marketing change, Tip Top decided to use small balls of honeycomb toffee instead.

It is the second-most popular ice cream flavour behind vanilla in New Zealand, and is a frequently cited example of Kiwiana. It is also exported to Japan, Australia, and the Pacific Islands.

== Origins and etymology ==
The term hokey pokey has been used in reference to honeycomb toffee in New Zealand since the late 19th century. The origin of this term, in reference to honeycomb specifically, is not known with certainty, and it is not until the mid-20th century that hokey pokey ice cream was created.

"Hokey pokey" was a slang term for ice cream in general in the 19th and early 20th centuries in several areas—including New York City and parts of Great Britain—specifically for the ice cream sold by street vendors or "hokey pokey men". The vendors, mostly of Italian descent, used a sales pitch or song involving the phrase "hokey pokey", for which several origins have been suggested. One such song in use in 1930s Liverpool was "Hokey pokey penny a lump, that's the stuff to make ye jump".

The term hokey pokey likely has multiple origins. One of these is the expression "hocus-pocus", which is possibly the source of the name hokey pokey in New Zealand. As a general name for ice cream outside New Zealand, it may be a corruption of one of several Italian phrases. According to "The Encyclopedia of Food" (published 1923, New York) hokey pokey (in the U.S.) is "a term applied to mixed colors and flavors of ice cream in cake form". The encyclopedia says the term originated from the Italian phrase oh che poco, 'oh how little'. Alternative possible derivations include other similar-sounding Italian phrases: for example ecco un poco, 'here is a (little) piece'.

== Related uses ==
- Hokey Pokey (The Ice Cream Song) (1975) is a song by Richard & Linda Thompson.
- Hokey Pokey is an ice cream parlour chain originally founded in the Prenzlauer Berg section of Berlin, Germany.
