= Tip Top (ice cream) =

Ice cream brand in New Zealand

Tip Top New Zealand
- Company type: Subsidiary
- Industry: Frozen confectionery manufacturing
- Founded: 1936
- Headquarters: Auckland, New Zealand
- Products: Ice cream, ice blocks
- Number of employees: 380
- Parent: Froneri
- Website: www.tiptop.co.nz

Tip Top is an ice cream brand founded in 1936 in Wellington, New Zealand, and now owned by the UK-based Froneri (a joint venture between PAI Partners and Nestlé). It was formerly known as Fonterra Brands (Tip Top) Ltd, a subsidiary of the Fonterra Co-operative Group based in Auckland, New Zealand.

== History ==
In 1936 Albert Hayman and Len Malaghan opened their first ice cream parlour in Manners Street, Wellington, followed in the same year by two more milk bars, one in Wellington and one in Dunedin. The Tip Top Ice Cream Company was registered as a manufacturing company in 1936. The name Tip Top was either chosen after Malaghan gave a Māori boy in a train an ice cream, and after being asked what he thought of it, the boy said "Oh, it's tip top", or that Hayman and Malaghan heard a person on a train say his meal was "tip top". By 1938 Tip Top was manufacturing its own ice cream and was successfully operating stores in the lower half of the North Island, and in Nelson and Blenheim.

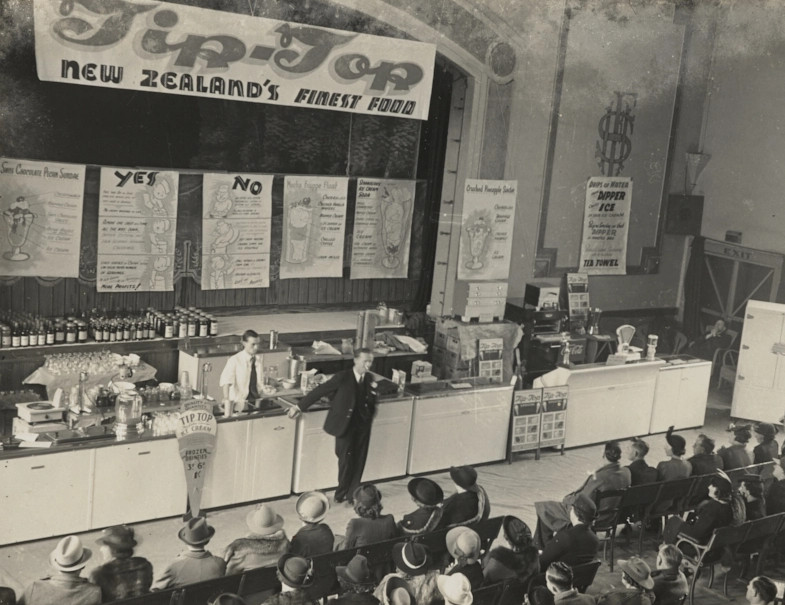
Sales presentation at a Tip Top Ice Cream conference in Wellington, 1940s

In May 1938 Tip Top Ice Cream Company Auckland Limited was incorporated into the growing ice cream business. Due to distribution difficulties and World War II, this was operated as a completely separate company from the Wellington Tip Top. By 1960 the company had expanded to such an extent that a parent company was formed, General Foods Corporation (NZ) Limited.

In November 1962, Hayman and Malaghan opened the biggest and most technically advanced ice cream factory in the Southern Hemisphere, at Mount Wellington, Auckland. The Tip Top factory included staff houses and 20 acres (81,000 m^{2}) of farm land overlooking the Southern Motorway and cost NZ$700,000. Prime Minister Keith Holyoake attended the opening ceremony. The Auckland Tip Top factory was originally a seasonal factory, which worked only to produce ice cream for the summer months. They sold for a shilling, and early innovations led to ice cream inventions like Topsy, Jelly Tip, FruJu and Ice Cream Sundaes. The commercial success of these products transformed the Mt Wellington site into a 24-hour, year-round operation.

General Foods Corporation (NZ) merged with J. Wattie Canneries Ltd and Cropper-NRM to form Watties Industries Ltd in 1968. As demand grew over the years, further plants were opened in Christchurch and Perth. In 1991 the Christchurch factory was upgraded to meet the stringent export requirements of the Japanese market.

In April 1997 Heinz Watties sold Tip Top to a Western Australian food processor, Peters & Browne's Foods. This merger of Peters & Browne's and Tip Top created the largest independent ice cream business in the Southern Hemisphere with combined sales of $550 million. Four years later in June 2001, New Zealand's national dairy co-operative Fonterra bought Tip Top Ice Cream after purchasing the Peter and Browne's Foods Business. In 2007 the Christchurch factory was closed, with all production moving to Auckland.

In 2019 Fonterra sold Tip Top for $380 million to UK-based company Froneri, a joint venture owned by the Swiss Nestlé and the French PAI Partners, citing a conflict of interest between Fonterra being a dairy nutrition company and Tip Top being a confectionery business.

In October 2022, Tip Top discontinued two flavours of ice cream including the Cookies & Cream flavour that had just won a national award in the previous month, to considerable public outcry in New Zealand.

== Operation ==
At the time of the 2019 sale to Froneri, Tip Top produced around 41 million litres of ice cream a year. Tip Top Ice Cream is exported to Australia, Japan, Taiwan, Malaysia, Indonesia and the Pacific Islands.

== List of brands ==
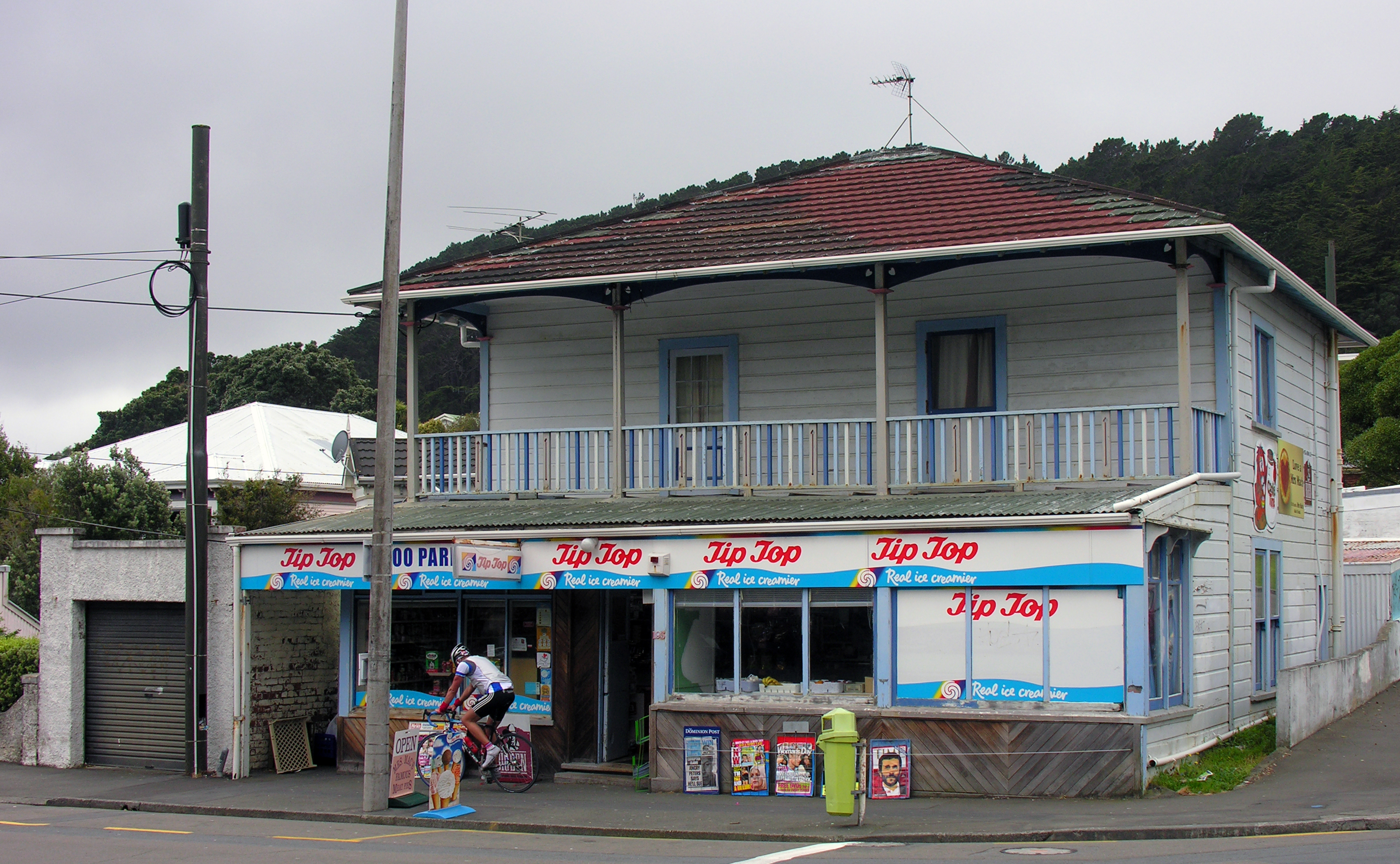
A dairy (convenience store) in Wellington bearing Tip Top branding

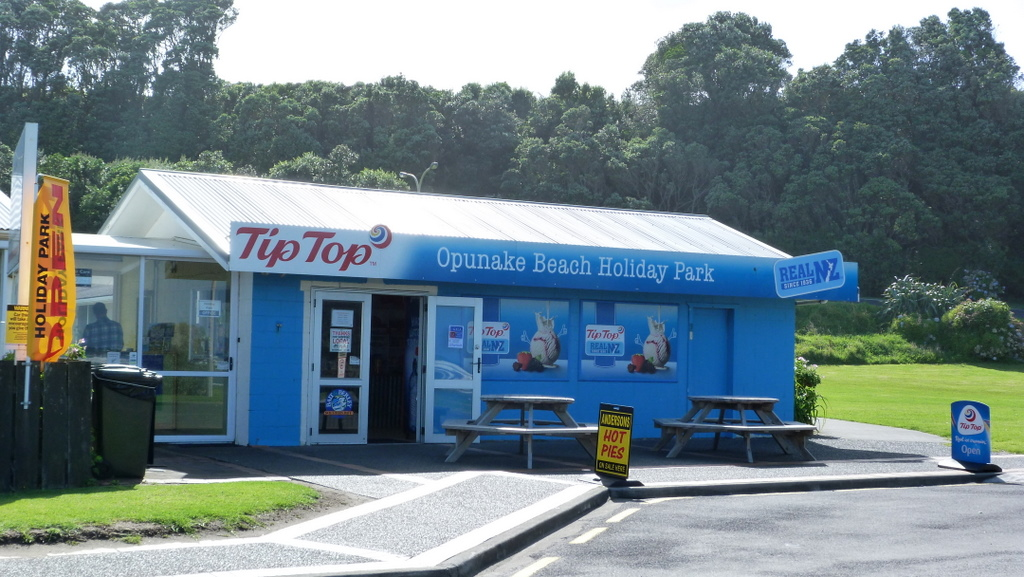
A dairy in Ōpunake bearing Tip Top branding and with a Tip Top footpath sign

=== Pre 1950s ===
- Tip Top Ice cream available in quarts (1 litre approx) and pints (600ml approx)
- Eskimo Pie (now known as Polar Pie)
- Topsy (first stick ice cream produced by Tip Top), named after a cow

=== 1950s ===
- Jelly Tip
- Rocky Road
- Toppa
- TT2's
- Joy Bar

=== 1960s ===
- Trumpet (first introduced in 1964)
- Fruju
- Moggy man

=== 1970s ===
- Popsicle
- R2D2 Space Ice
- Choc Bar

=== 1980s ===
- Crofters Cheesecakes
- Goody Goody Gum Drops
- Batman
- Hokey Bar (with heart of gold)

=== 1990s ===
- Memphis Meltdown
- Teenage Mutant Ninja Turtles (in a 2-litre bowl with the ice cream resembling one of the turtles)
- Moritz
- Cadbury Ice Cream range (in 2 litre bowls and novelty cones)
- Sonic the Hedgehog Milk Ice
- Paradiso

=== 2000s ===
- Popsicle Creamy (previously Chill)
- Screwball
- Soft Serve
- Ronald McDonald ice cream
- Cone Ball
- Choc bar
