= Coffee culture =

Traditions and social behaviors associated with the consumption of coffee

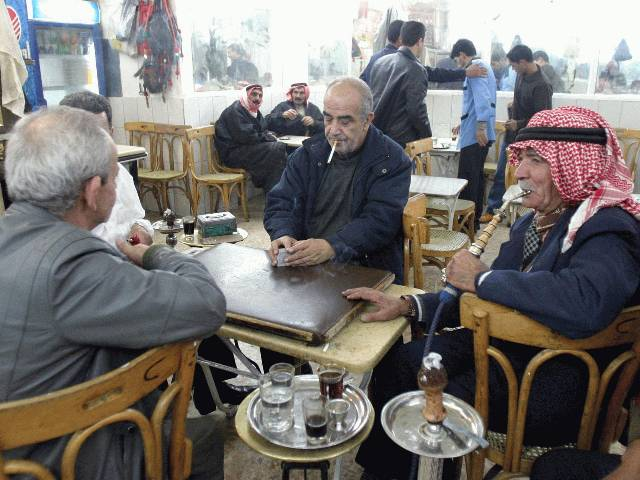
A coffeehouse in Damascus (2003)

Coffee culture is the set of traditions and etiquette that surround the consumption of coffee, particularly as a social lubricant. The term also refers to the cultural diffusion and adoption of coffee as a widely consumed stimulant. In the late-twentieth century, espresso became an increasingly dominant drink contributing to coffee culture, particularly in the Western world and other urban areas worldwide. In the early twenty-first century, mobile coffee carts and pop-up espresso bars also became part of coffee culture, offering specialty drinks at markets, festivals, and retail events.

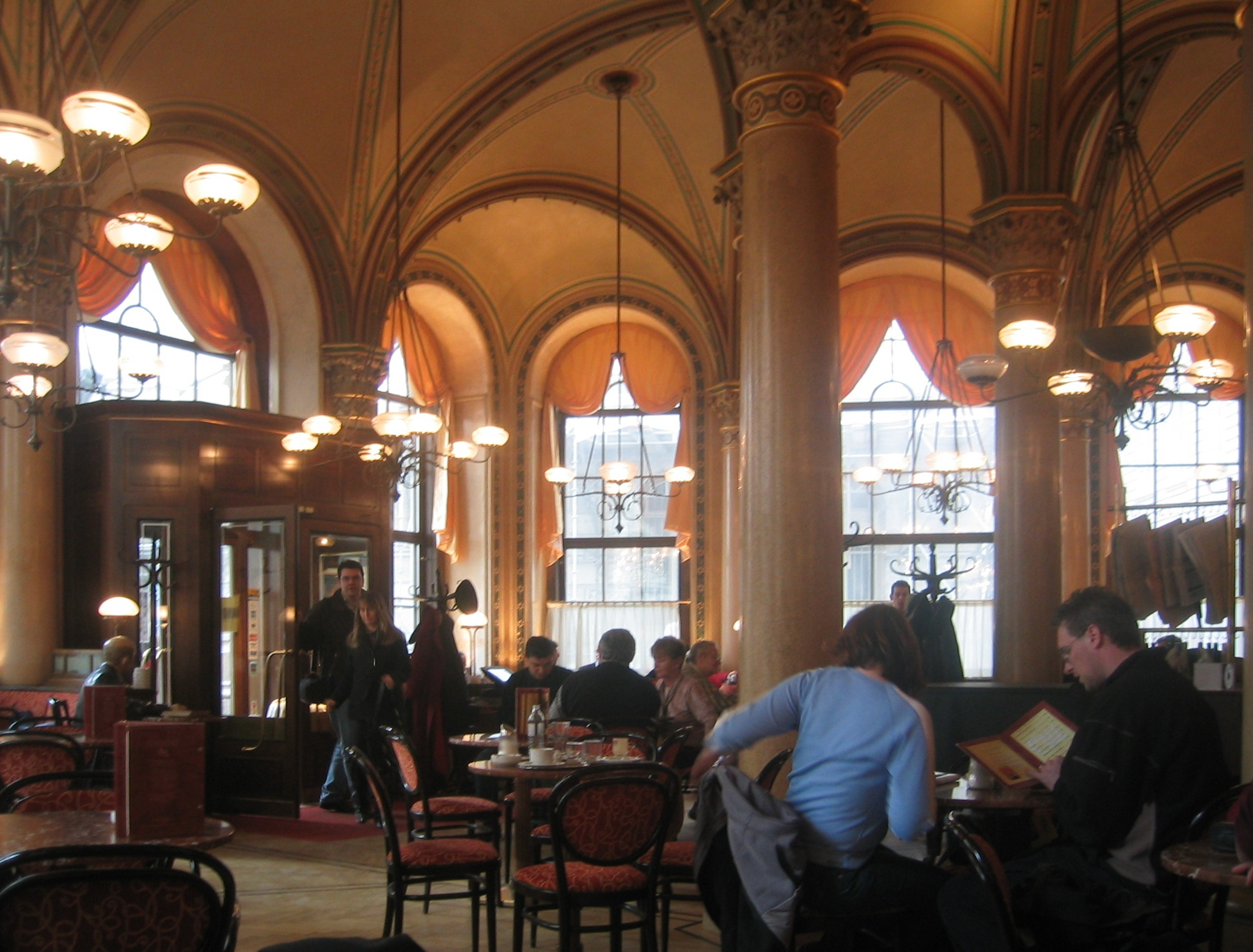
A Viennese coffeehouse (2004)

The culture surrounding coffee and coffeehouses dates back to 16th-century Ottoman Turkey. Coffeehouses in Western Europe and the Eastern Mediterranean were not only social hubs but also artistic and intellectual centres. In the late 17th and 18th centuries, coffeehouses in London became popular meeting places for artists, writers, and socialites, as well as centres for political and commercial activity. In the 19th century, a special coffee house culture developed in Vienna, the Viennese coffee house, which then spread throughout Central Europe. Les Deux Magots in Paris, now a popular tourist attraction, was once associated with the intellectuals Jean-Paul Sartre and Simone de Beauvoir.

Elements of modern coffeehouses include slow-paced gourmet service, alternative brewing techniques, and well-decorated atmosphere.

In the United States, coffee culture often describes the ubiquitous presence of espresso stands and coffee shops in metropolitan areas and the spread of massive, international franchises such as Starbucks. Many coffee shops offer customers access to free Wi-Fi, encouraging business or personal work at these locations. Coffee culture varies by country, state, and city.

In urban centres worldwide, it is not unusual to see espresso shops and stands within walking distance of one another or on opposite corners of the same street. The term coffee culture is also used in popular business media to describe the deep impact of the market penetration of coffee-serving establishments.

== History ==
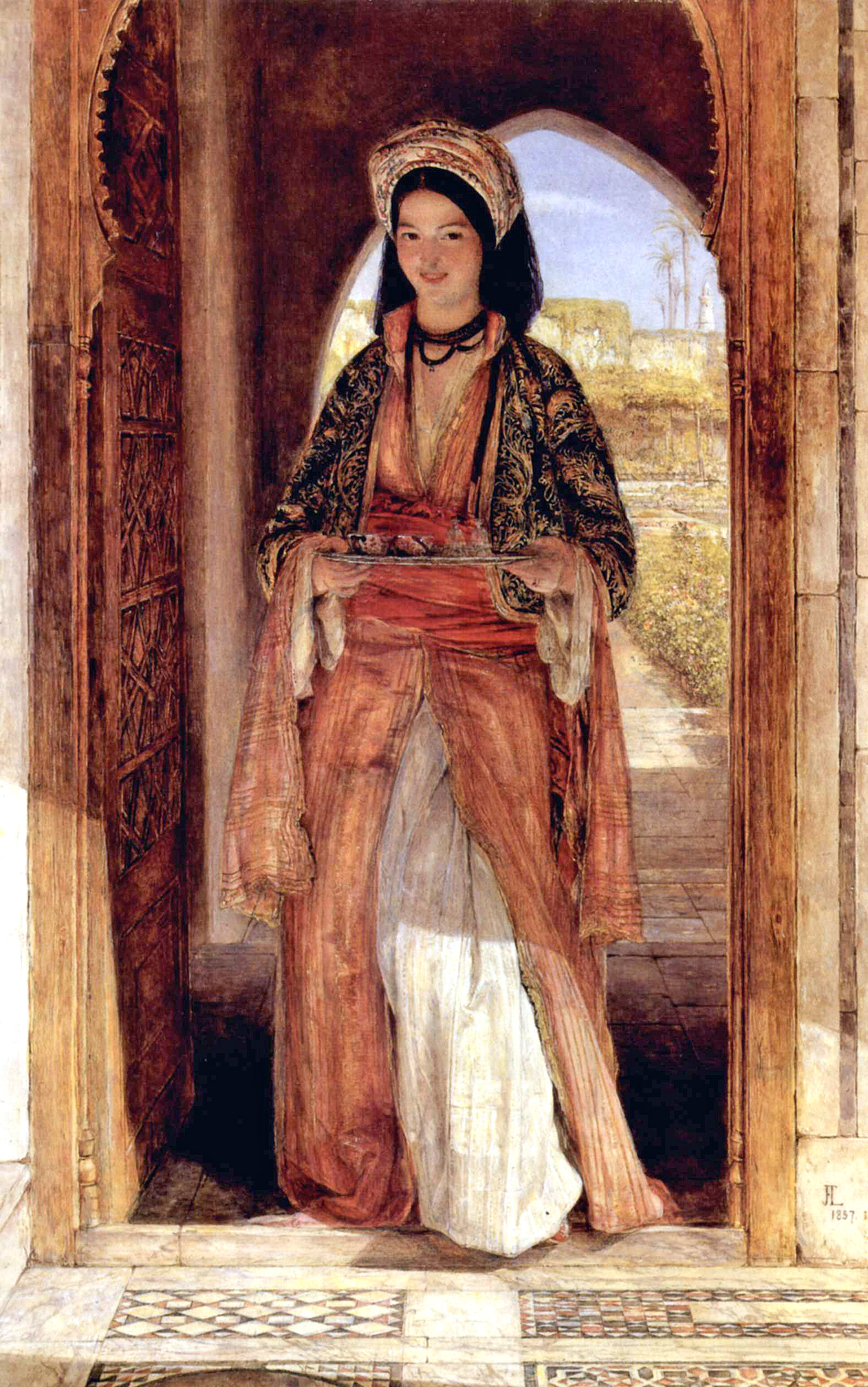
A coffee bearer, from the Ottoman quarters in Cairo (1857)

The earliest-grown coffee can be traced from Ethiopia. Evidence of knowledge of the coffee tree and coffee drinking first appeared in the late 15th century; the Sufi shaykh Muhammad ibn Sa'id al-Dhabhani, the Mufti of Aden, is known to have imported goods from Ethiopia to Yemen. Yemeni sufis drank coffee to help in concentration when they chanted the name of God.

By 1414, the plant was known in Mecca, and in the early 16th century was spreading to the Mamluk Sultanate in Egypt and North Africa from the Yemeni port of Mokha.

During the 15th century, coffee was known to be a beverage used in the Ottoman Empire. Later, in the early 16th century coffee was forbidden by conservative imams but a fatwa by the Grand Mufti Ebussuud Efendi overturned this ban. Also during this period, coffee plants spread from Africa to the Arabian Peninsula, the Levant and Persia. From the Middle East, coffee drinking spread to Italy, then to the rest of Europe, and coffee plants were transported by the Dutch to the East Indies and to the Americas.

Within a year of the Battle of Mohacs (1526), coffee had reached Vienna by Turks. In Italy, like in most of Europe, coffee arrived in the second half of the 16th century through the commercial routes of the Mediterranean Sea. In 1580 the Venetian botanist and physician Prospero Alpini imported coffee into the Republic of Venice from Egypt. The first coffeehouse in England was opened in St. Michael's Alley in Cornhill, London. The proprietor was Pasqua Rosée, the servant of Daniel Edwards, a trader in Turkish goods. By 1675, there were more than 3,000 coffeehouses throughout England.

In 1658 the Dutch first used them to begin coffee cultivation in Ceylon (now Sri Lanka) and later in southern India; but abandoned this cultivation to focus on their Javanese plantations in order to avoid lowering the price by oversupply. Within a few years, the Dutch colonies (Java in Asia, Suriname in the Americas) had become the main suppliers of coffee to Europe. The Dutch also introduced it to Japan in the 17th century, it remained a curiosity until the lifting of trade restrictions in 1858 (the first European-style coffeehouse opened in Tokyo in 1888). Coffee also came to India from Baba Budan, a Sufi saint who introduced coffee beans from Yemen to the hills of Chikmagalur, Karnataka, in 1670. Since then coffee plantations have become established in the region, extending south to Kodagu.

Gabriel de Clieu brought coffee seedlings to Martinique in the Caribbean in 1720. Those sprouts flourished and 50 years later there were 18,680 coffee trees in Martinique enabling the spread of coffee cultivation to Saint-Domingue (Haiti), Mexico and other islands of the Caribbean. The French territory of Saint-Domingue saw coffee cultivated starting in 1734, and by 1788 supplied half the world's coffee. Coffee had a major influence on the geography of Latin America. For many decades in the 19th and early 20th centuries, Brazil was the biggest producer of coffee and a virtual monopolist in the trade. However, a policy of maintaining high prices soon opened opportunities to other nations, such as Venezuela and Colombia. Worldwide production is increasing as of 2021.

== Coffeehouses ==
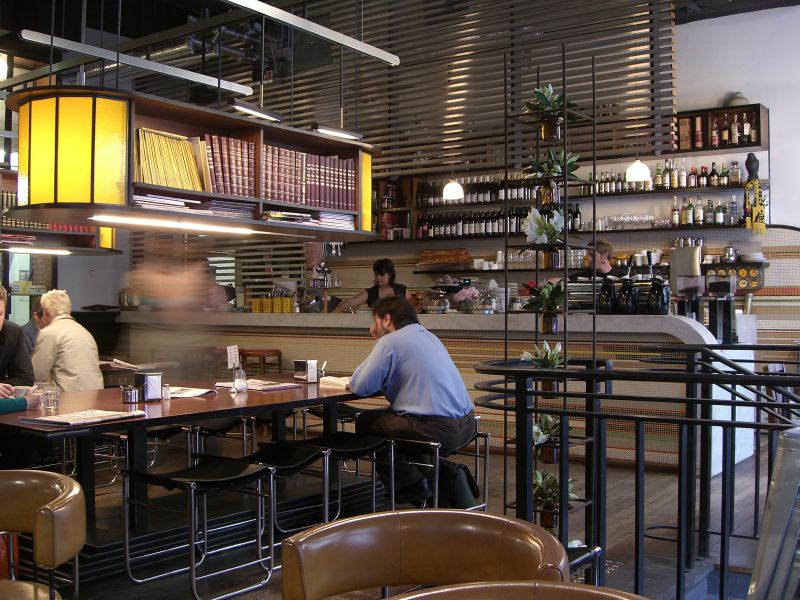
A coffee shop at a library in Melbourne (2006)

A coffeehouse or café is an establishment that primarily serves coffee, as well as other beverages. Historically, cafés have been important social gathering places in Europe, and continue to be venues of social interaction today. During the 16th century, coffeehouses were temporarily banned in Mecca due to a fear that they attracted political uprising.

In 2016, Albania surpassed Spain as the country with the most coffeehouses per capita in the world. In fact, there are 654 coffeehouses per 100,000 inhabitants in Albania; a country with only 2.5 million inhabitants.

Café culture in China has multiplied over the years: Shanghai alone has an estimated 6,500 coffeehouses, including small chains and larger corporations like Starbucks.

Additionally, Seoul, South Korea, has a high concentration of coffeehouses. There was a 900% rise in coffee shops between 2006 and 2011, as well as an 1800% rise in national sales during this same time. There is a coffee Expo in Seoul that attracts many buyers and sellers, and continues to promote the growth of coffee within South Korea.

In addition to coffee, many cafés also serve tea, sandwiches, pastries, and other light refreshments. Some cafés provide other services, such as wired or wireless internet access (the name, internet café, has carried over to stores that provide internet service without any coffee) for their customers. This has also spread to a type of café known as the LAN Café, which allows users to have access to computers that already have PC games installed.

== Social aspects ==
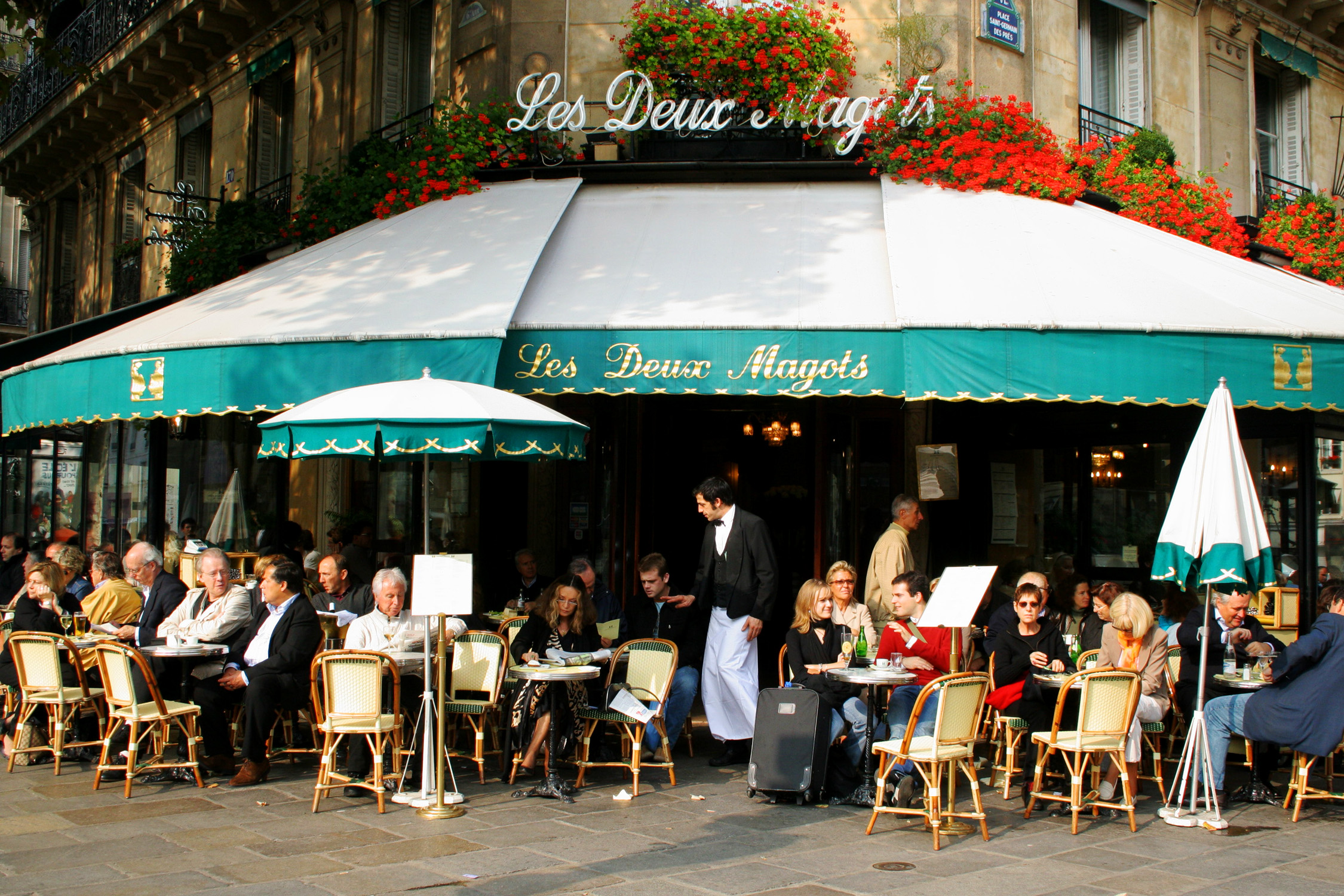
Les Deux Magots in Paris, once a famous haunt of French intellectuals (2006)

Many social aspects of coffee can be seen in the modern-day lifestyle. By absolute volume, the United States is the largest market for coffee, followed by Germany and Japan, with Canada, Australia, Sweden and New Zealand also being large coffee-consuming countries. Countries in Northern and Western Europe consume the most coffee per capita, with Finland typically occupying the top spot with a per-capita consumption of 12 kg (26 lb) per year, followed by Norway, Iceland, Denmark, The Netherlands, and Sweden. Consumption has vastly increased in recent years in the traditionally tea-drinking United Kingdom, but is still below 5 kg (11 lb) per person per year as of 2005. Turkish coffee is popular in Turkey, the Eastern Mediterranean, and southeastern Europe.

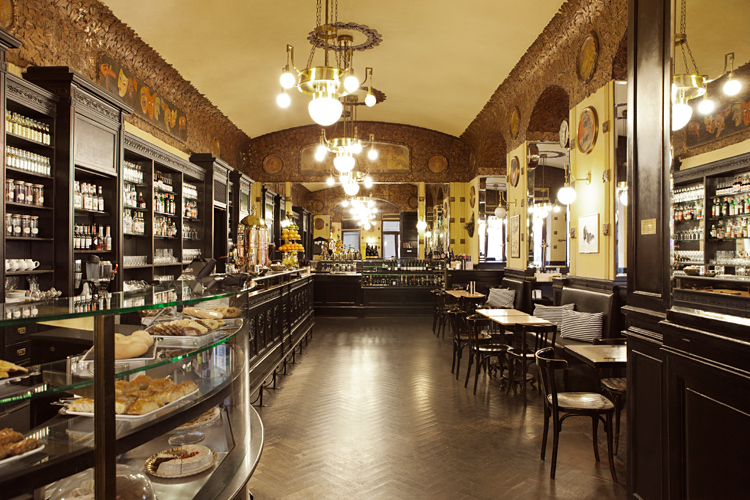
Caffè San Marco in Trieste, known for its artists, writers and intellectuals (2014)

Coffeehouse culture had a strong cultural penetration in much of the former Ottoman Empire, where Turkish coffee remains the dominant style of preparation. The coffee enjoyed in the Ottoman Middle East was produced in Yemen/Ethiopia, despite multiple attempts to ban the substance for its stimulating qualities. By 1600, coffee and coffeehouses were a prominent feature of Ottoman life. There are various scholarly perspectives on the functions of the Ottoman coffeehouse. Many of these argue that Ottoman coffeehouses were centres of important social ritual, making them as, or more important than, the coffee itself. "At the start of the modern age, the coffeehouses were places for renegotiating the social hierarchy and for challenging the social order". Throughout the existence of the coffeehouse, banning of women from the houses was quite prevalent. They were banned from visiting them in England; however, they often frequented them in parts of Germany. The ban may have been due to the 1674 "Women's Petition Against Coffee" which stated:

The Excessive Use of that Newfangled, Abominable, Heathenish Liquor called COFFEE has Eunucht our Husbands, and Crippled our more kind Gallants, that they are become as Impotent, as Age.

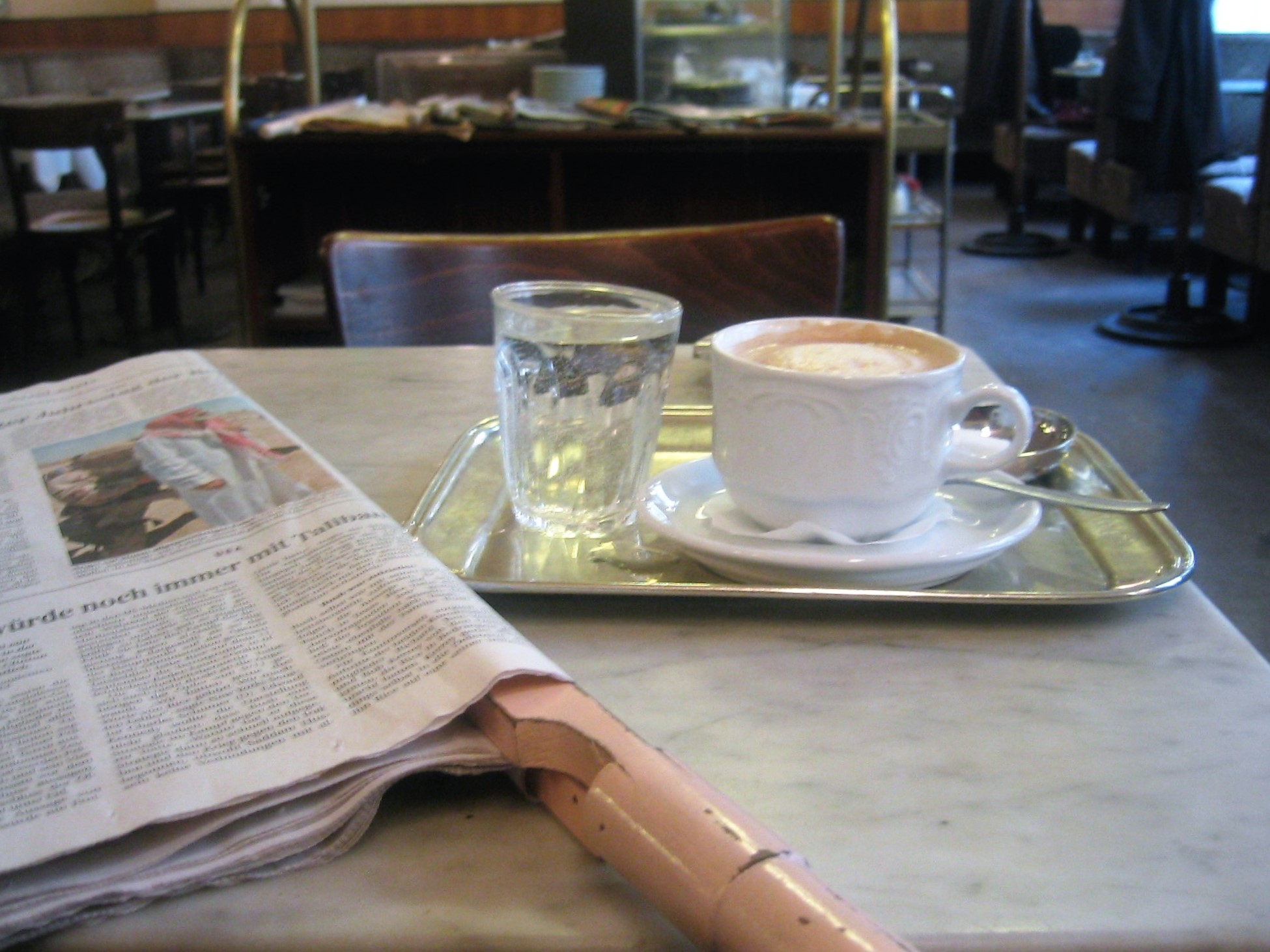
Central European Habsburg coffee house culture: news, coffee, the glass of water and the marble table top (2004)

Coffee has been important in Austrian and French culture since the late 19th and early 20th centuries. Vienna's coffeehouses are prominent in Viennese culture and known internationally, while Paris was instrumental in the development of "café society" in the first half of the 20th century.

The Viennese coffee house culture then spread across Central Europe. Scientists and artists met in the special microcosm of the Viennese coffee houses of the Habsburg Empire. The artists, musicians, intellectuals, bon vivants and their financiers met in the coffee house and discussed new projects, theories and worldviews. A lot of information was also obtained in the coffee house, because local and foreign newspapers were freely available to all guests. This multicultural atmosphere and culture was largely destroyed by the later National Socialism and Communism and only persisted in individual places that remained in the slipstream of history, such as Vienna or Trieste. Trieste in particular was and is an important point of reference in terms of coffee culture, because it is the most important port and processing location for coffee in Central Europe and Italy. In this diverse coffee house culture of the multicultural Habsburg Empire, various types of coffee preparation also developed. This is how the world-famous cappuccino developed from the Viennese Kapuziner coffee via the Italian-speaking parts of the empire in northern Italy.

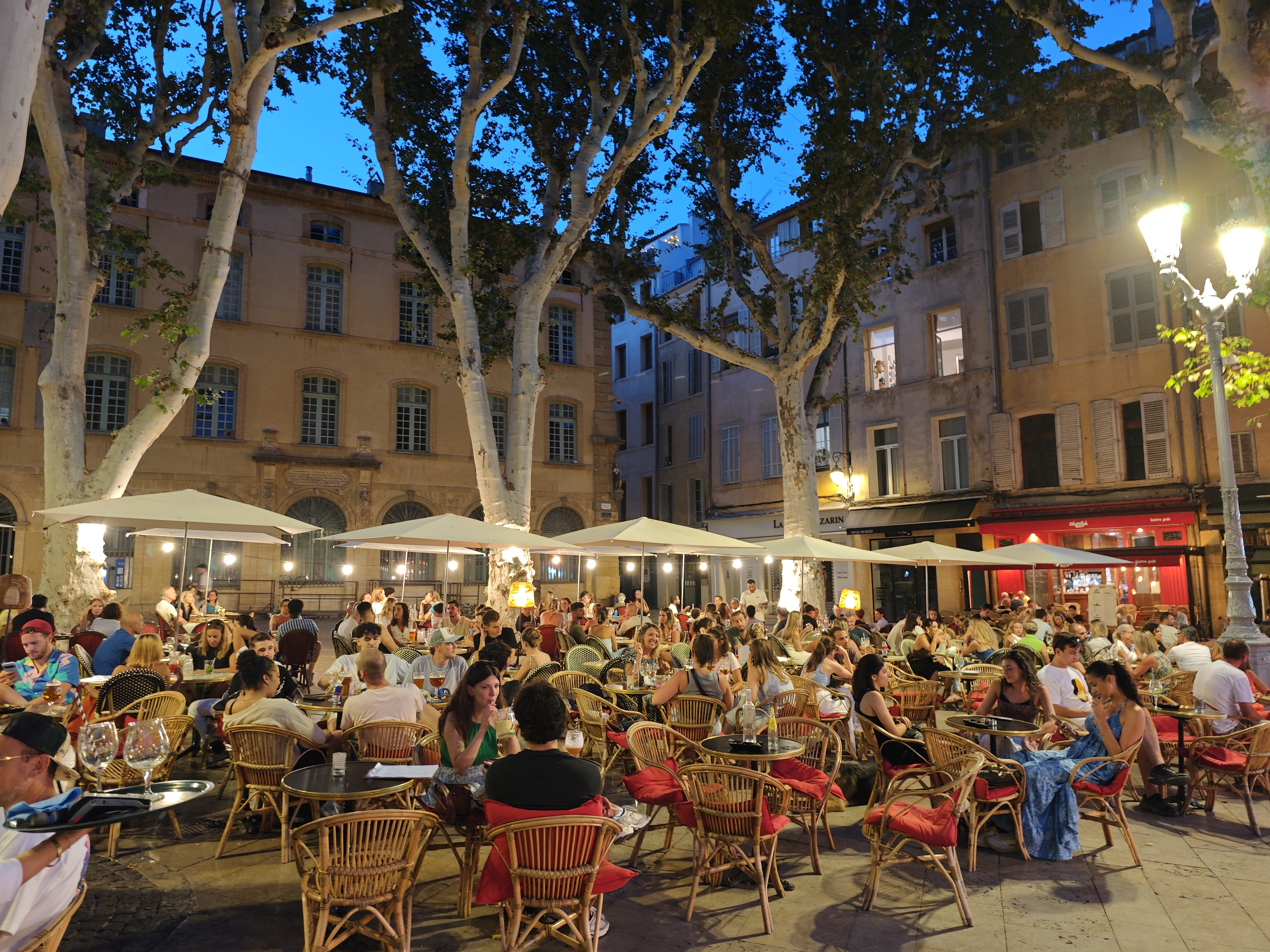
Evening Café Culture in Aix-en-Provence

In France, coffee consumption is also often viewed as a social activity and exists largely within the café culture. Espresso based drinks, including but not limited to café au lait and caffè crema, are most popular within modern French coffee culture.

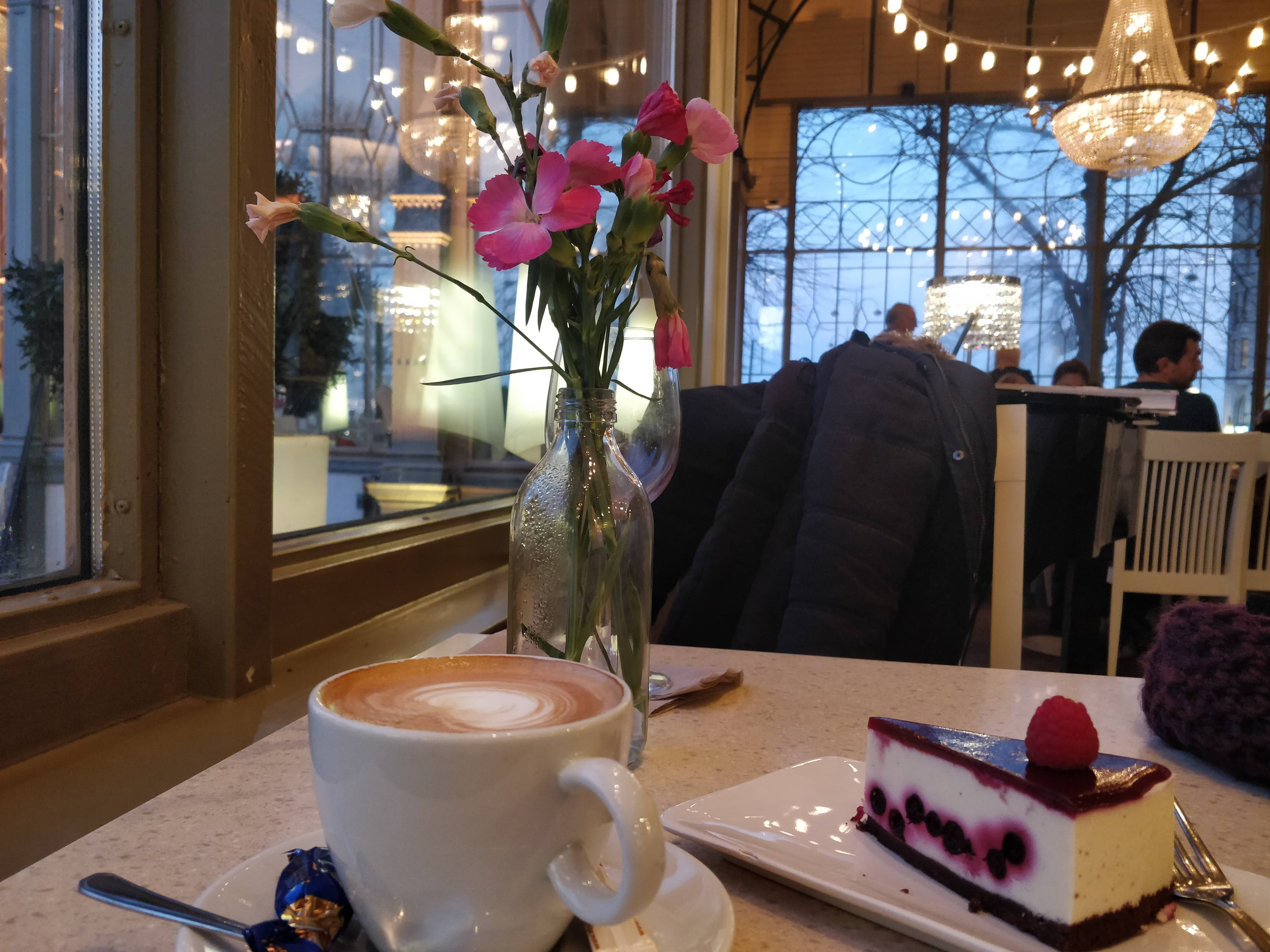
A cup of coffee with cheesecake at a cafe in Helsinki, Finland

Notably in Northern Europe, coffee parties are a popular form of entertainment. The host or hostess of the coffee party also serves cake and pastries, which are sometimes homemade. In Germany, Netherlands, Austria, and the Nordic countries, strong black coffee is also regularly consumed during or immediately after main meals such as lunch and dinner and several times a day at work or school. In these countries, especially Germany and Sweden, restaurants and cafés will often provide free refills of black coffee, especially if customers purchase a sweet treat or pastry with their drink. In the United States, coffee shops are typically used as meeting spots for business, and are frequented as dating spots for young adults.

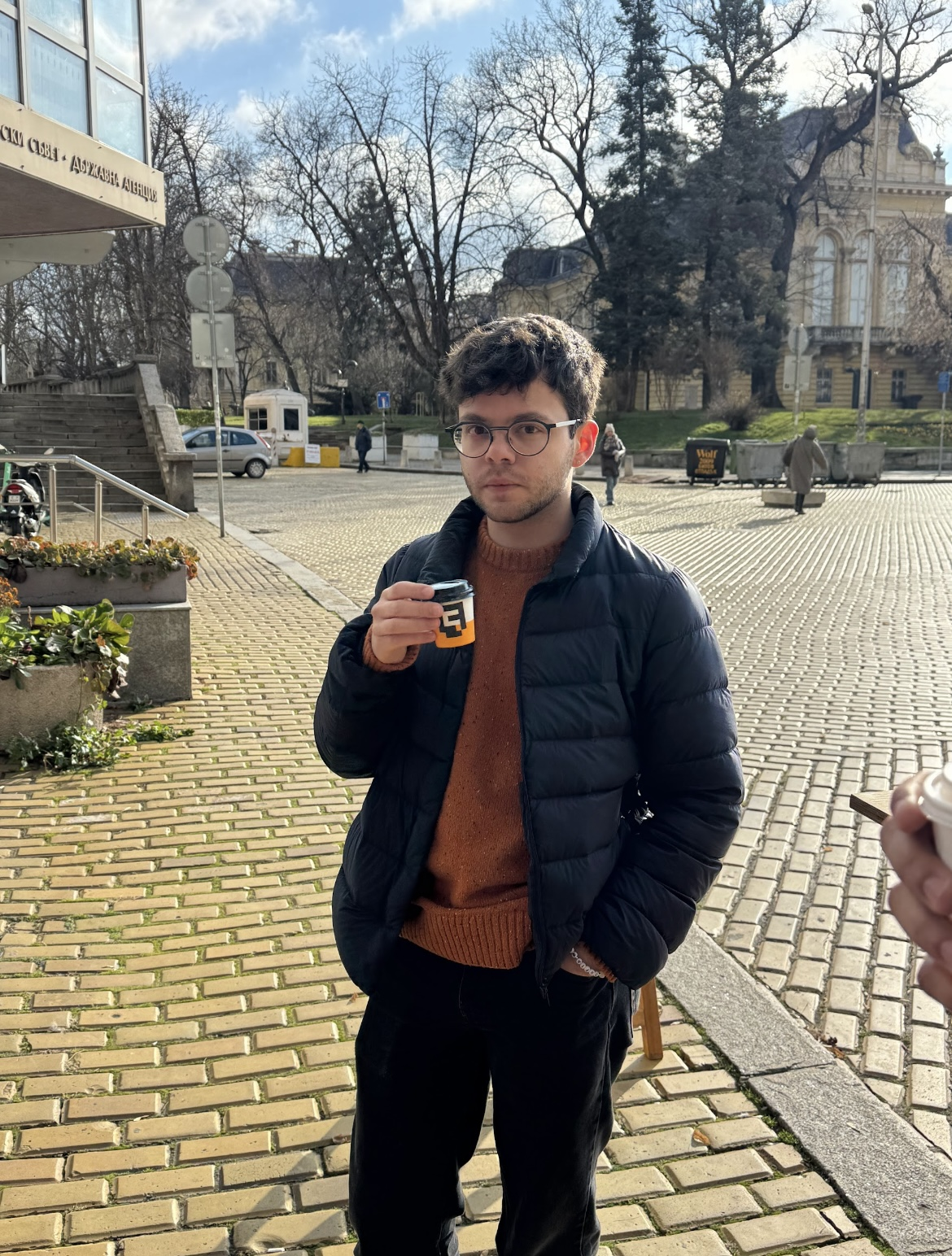
A North American with his coffee.

In North America, coffee is less of a social commodity. While in the rest of the world, one typically sits in a coffee shop to enjoy the drink, North Americans commonly take their coffee to go. North Americans also typically drink larger coffees (up to 24 ounces), whereas coffee is usually consumed in smaller quantities (2 to 8 ounces) elsewhere.

Coffee has played a large role in history and literature because of the effects of the industry on cultures where it is produced and consumed. Coffee is often regarded as one of the primary economic goods used in imperial control of trade. The colonised trade patterns in goods, such as slaves, coffee, and sugar, defined Brazilian trade for centuries. Coffee in culture or trade is a central theme and prominently referenced in poetry, fiction, and regional history.

== Coffee utensils ==
- Coffee grinder
- Coffee pot, for brewing with hot water, made of glass or metal
- Coffeemaker
- Coffee cup, for drinking coffee, usually smaller than a teacup in North America and Europe
- Saucer placed under the coffee cup
- Coffee spoon, usually small and used for stirring the coffee in the cup
- Coffee service tray, to place the coffee utensils on and to keep the hot water from spilling onto the table
- Coffee canister, usually airtight, for storing coffee
- Water kettle, or coffee kettle, for heating the water
- Sugar bowl, for granular sugar or sugar lumps or cubes
- Cream pitcher or jug, also called a creamer, for fresh milk or cream

== Coffee break ==
A coffee break is a routine social gathering for a snack or short downtime by employees in various work industries. Allegedly originating in the late 19th century by the wives of Norwegian immigrants, in Stoughton, Wisconsin, it is celebrated there every year with the Stoughton Coffee Break Festival. In 1951, Time magazine noted that "since the war, the coffee break has been written into union contracts". The term subsequently became popular through a 1952 ad campaign of the Pan-American Coffee Bureau which urged consumers to "give yourself a Coffee-Break — and Get What Coffee Gives to You." John B. Watson, a behavioural psychologist who worked with Maxwell House later in his career, helped popularise coffee breaks within American culture.

== Coffee competitions ==
Coffee competitions take place across the globe with people at the regional competing to achieve national titles and then compete on the international stage. World Coffee Events holds the largest of such events – the World Coffee Championships – in a different location each year. The competition includes the World Barista Championship – a competition that judges Baristas worldwide on drink taste, presentation, technique, and cleanliness – the World Brewer's Cup – a competition that judges coffee brewers on hand-brewed filter coffee – the World Latte art championship, World Cup Tasters championship, a Coffee Roasters championship and a Cezve/Ibrik championship.

== By country or region ==
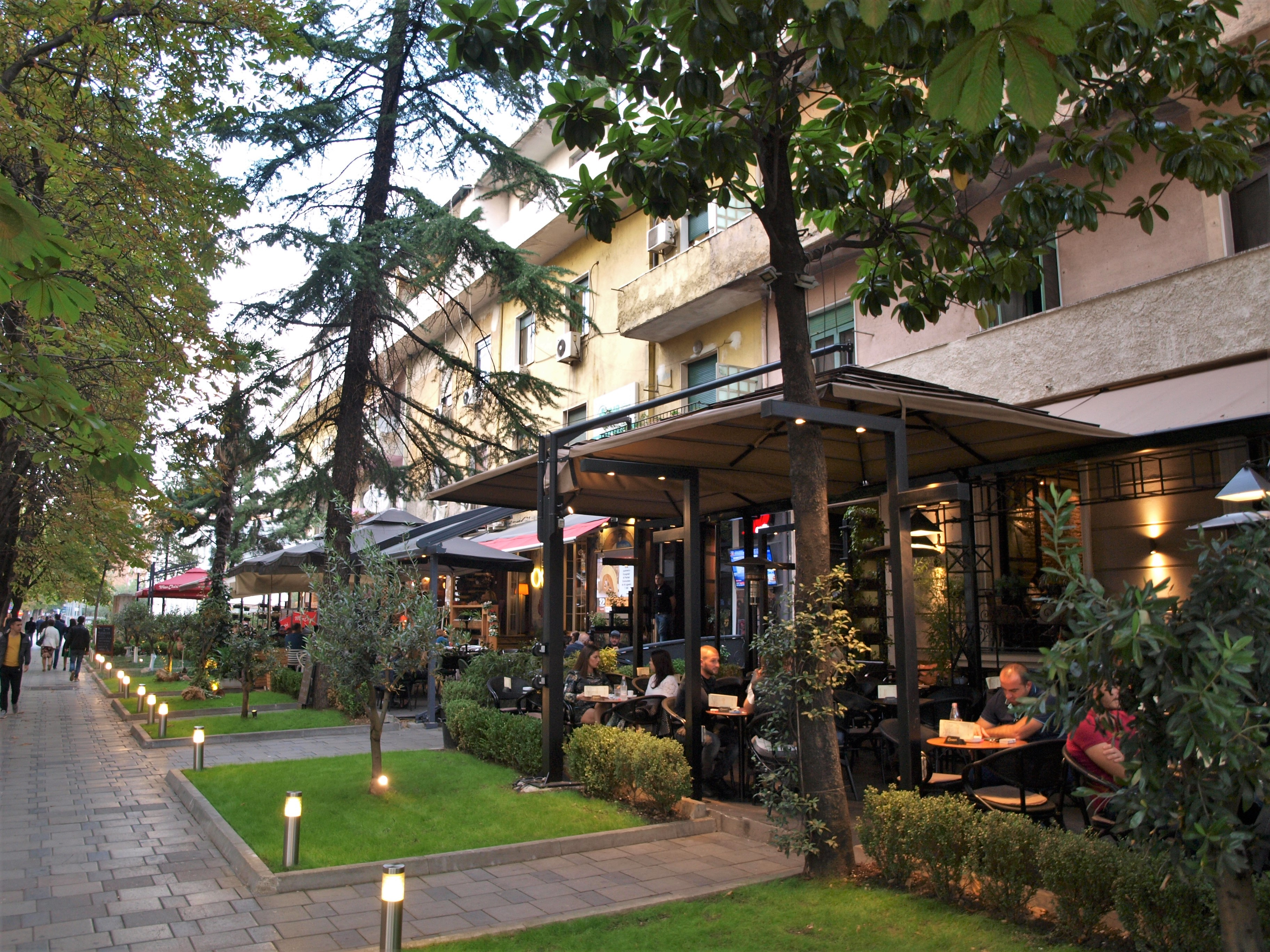
Cafés in central Tirana (2017)

=== Albania ===
In 2016, Albania surpassed Spain by becoming the country with the most coffeehouses per capita in the world. There are 654 coffeehouses per 100,000 inhabitants in Albania, a country with only 2.5 million inhabitants. This is due to coffeehouses closing down in Spain because of the economic crisis, whereas Albania had an equal amount of cafés opening and closing. Also, the fact that it is one of the easiest ways to make a living after the fall of Communism in Albania.

=== Australia ===
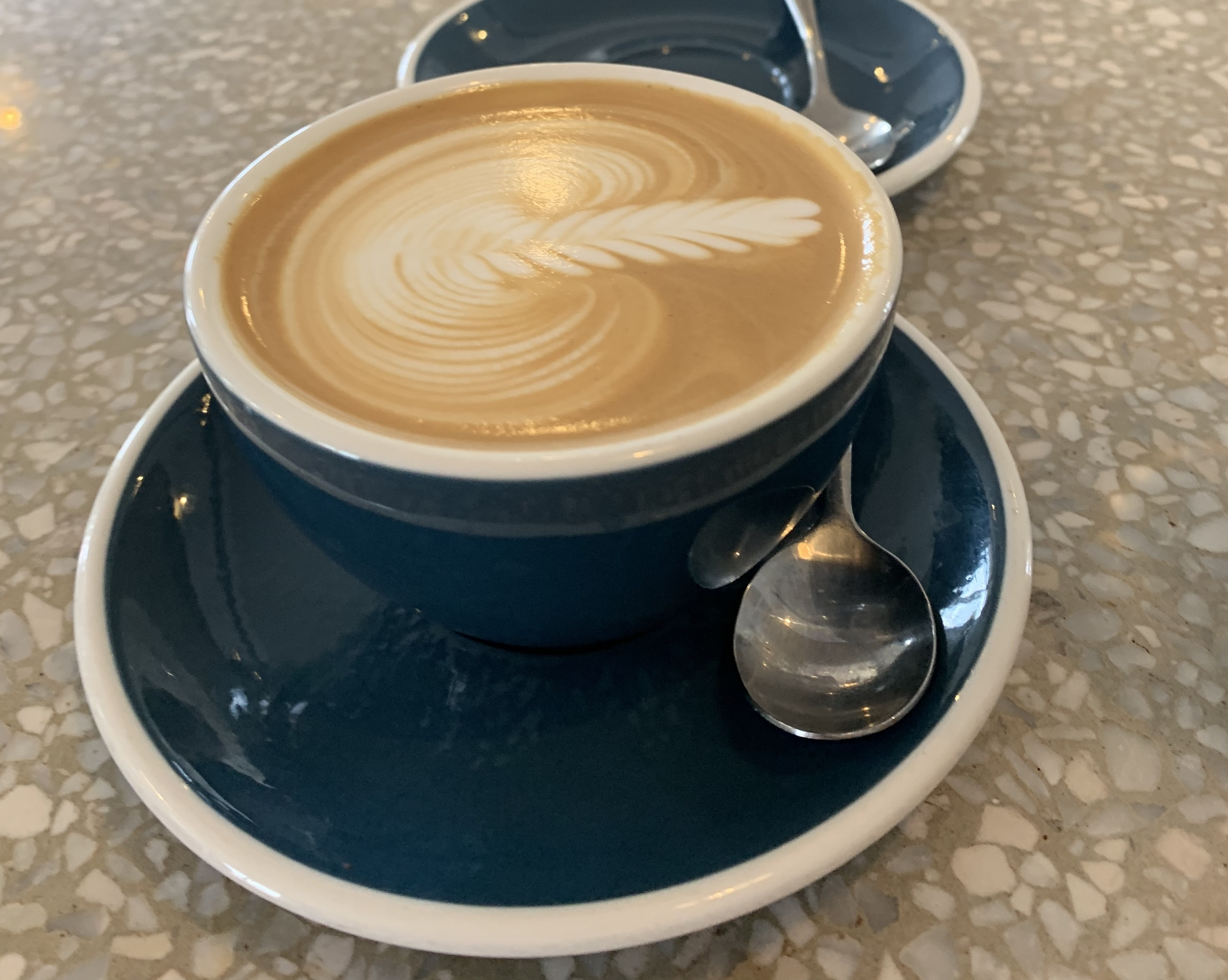
A flat white coffee, a classic Australian coffee

Coffee culture has become a significant cultural phenomenon in Australia.

==== Greek-Australian ====
Greek café culture in Australia (Greek: Ελληνική κουλτούρα καφενείον στην Αυστραλία) is part of the shared history of Greece and Australia. For unskilled penniless Greek migrants, it was a pathway to success in which they created community hubs where Australians socialised. Greek cafés are also a singularly Australian phenomenon: the success of Arthur Comino’s fish shop in Sydney gave rise to a chain migration that saw hundreds of Greek migrants open oyster saloons across Australia by 1900.

Adapting to market changes and food trends, Greek proprietors went on to run fish shops, fruit shops, ice cream parlours, sundae shops, milk bars, snack bars, confectioneries, and cafés that dotted the Australian landscape for much of the twentieth century.

=== Esperantujo ===
In Esperanto culture, a gufujo (plural gufujoj) is a non-alcoholic, non-smoking, makeshift European-style café that opens in the evening. Esperanto speakers meet at a specified location, either a rented space or someone's house, and enjoy live music or readings with tea, coffee, pastries, etc. There may be a cash payment required as expected in an actual café. It is a calm atmosphere in direct contrast to the wild parties that other Esperanto speakers might be having elsewhere. Gufujoj were originally intended for people who dislike crowds, loud noise and partying.

=== Hong Kong ===
In the 1920s, mostly wealthy people or those with higher socioeconomic status could afford to drink coffee whereas ordinary people were rarely able to afford the drink, which was more expensive than traditional beverages. Yuenyeung (coffee with tea) was invented in Hong Kong in 1936.

=== Italy ===
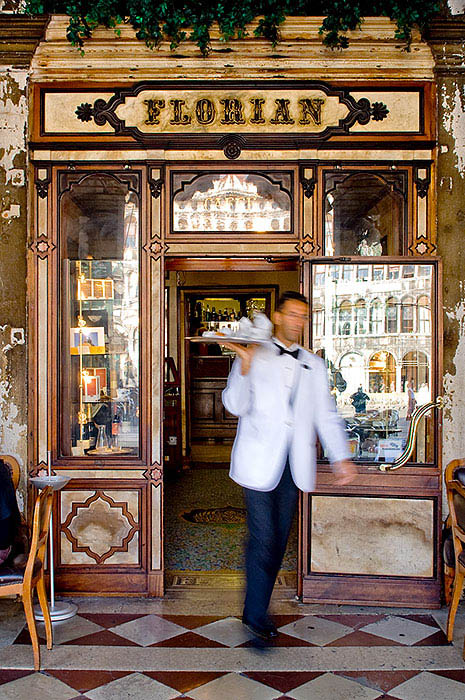
Caffè Florian in Venice (2015)

In Italy, locals drink coffee at the counter, as opposed to taking it away to drink elsewhere. Italians serve espresso as the default coffee, do not flavor espresso, and traditionally never drink cappuccinos after 11:00. In fact, dairy-based espresso drinks are usually only enjoyed in the morning. A macchiato is an espresso shot with a splash of milk. The oldest cafe in Italy is Caffe Florian in Venice.

In terms of coffee consumption, the city of Trieste, once the port of Austria-Hungary, stands out, because inhabitants from Trieste drink an average of 1,500 cups of coffee per year and capita; about twice the average that is consumed elsewhere in Italy.

=== Japan ===
In 1888, the first coffeehouse opened in Japan, known as Kahiichakan, which means a café that provides both coffee and tea. In the 1970s, many kissaten (coffee-tea shop) appeared around the Tokyo area such as Shinjuku, Ginza, and in the popular student areas such as Kanda. These kissaten were centralized in estate areas around railway stations with around 200 stores in Shinjuku alone. Globalization made the coffee chain stores start appearing in the 1980s. In 1982, the All Japan Coffee Association stated that there were 162,000 stores in Japan. The import volume doubled from 1970-80 from 89,456 to 194,294 tons.

=== Puerto Rico ===
Puerto Rico’s coffee culture today is vibrant and centered around a mix of traditional and contemporary coffeehouses and specialty cafés. While most of the island's coffee bean production comes from Adjuntas, Lares, Utuado, and Yauco, classic coffee shops to modern styles can be found throughout the island. Certain regions and shops, have their own style and even produce local sweets such as coffee flan (Spanish: flan de café), cakes and treats.

Events related to coffee are an important part of the island’s cultural calendar and attract both enthusiasts and industry participants. The annual Yauco National Coffee Festival in the mountainous municipality of Yauco celebrates Puerto Rico’s coffee heritage with tastings, farm tours, workshops, barista demonstrations, music, food, and artisanal markets. Other coffee-related gatherings and expos also occur throughout the year, highlighting local producers, promoting specialty coffee, and reinforcing the role of coffee culture in Puerto Rican community life.

=== South Africa ===
==== Cape Town ====
Coffee culture in Cape Town is thriving, and the city is considered one of the coffee capitals of the world, and one of the best cities for the drink. It is home to the headquarters of four of South Africa's five largest coffeehouse chains, as well as 10 roasteries, and numerous independent cafés.

=== Sweden ===
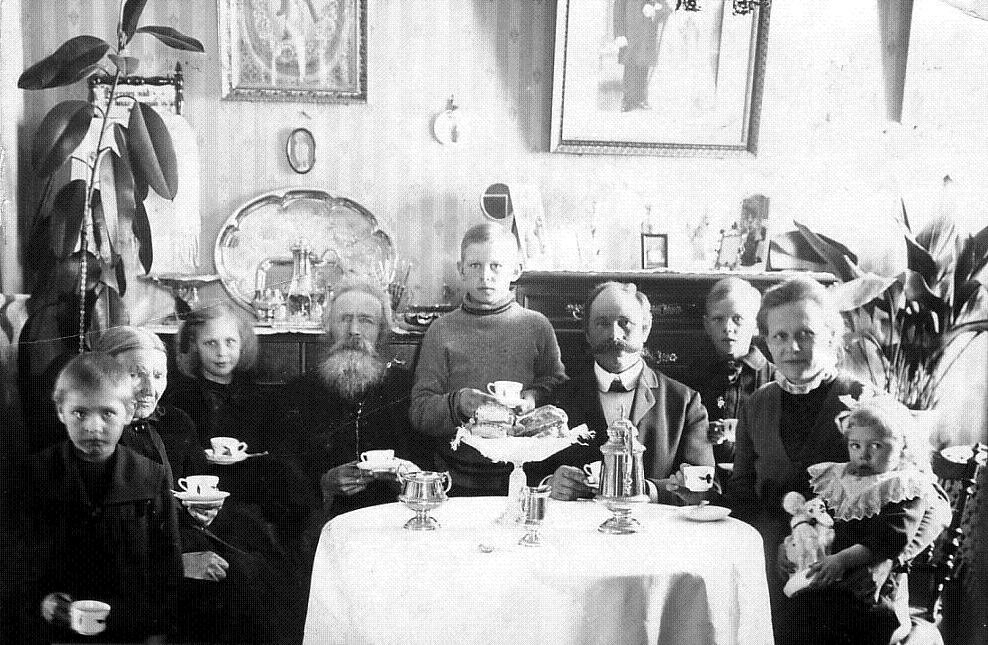
Family in Söderhamn, Sweden, seated for fika (c. 1916)

The first recorded shipment of coffee arrived in 1685 in Gothenburg but only gained popularity in the early-eighteenth century, among the wealthy. Various royal edicts and bans later attempted to curb coffee consumption. King Gustav III opposed coffee, commissioning an experiment on its effects. Restrictions ended in 1823, after which coffee became a staple. Sweden is now among the highest per capita consumers of coffee in the world.

Swedes have fika (pronounced [ˈfîːka]; back slang of kaffi [coffee, dialectal]), which is a coffee break with sweet breads or sometimes pastries, although coffee can be replaced by tea, juice, lemonade, hot chocolate, or diluting juice for children.

The tradition has spread throughout Swedish businesses across the world. Fika is a social institution in Sweden and the practice of taking a break with a beverage and snack is widely accepted as central to the Swedish way of life. As a common mid-morning and mid-afternoon practice at workplaces in Sweden, fika may also function partially as an informal meeting between co-workers and management, and it may even be considered impolite not to partake in the proceedings. Fika often takes place in a meeting room or a designated fika room. A sandwich, some fruit, or a small meal may be called fika like the English concept of afternoon tea.

== Education and research ==
An American college course entitled "Design of Coffee" is part of the chemical engineering curriculum at University of California, Davis. A research facility devoted to coffee research was under development on the UC Davis campus in early 2017.

Trieste is the seat of the Università del Caffè, founded in 1999 by Illy. This competence center was created to spread the culture of quality coffee through training all over the world, to train Barrista and to carry out research and innovation.

== In media ==
Coffee culture frequently appears in comics, television, and film in varied ways. The comic strips Adam and Pearls Before Swine frequently centre the strip around visiting or working at coffee shops. Television shows such as NCIS frequently show characters with espresso in hand or distributing to-go cups to other characters. In the television show Friends, the main cast gathers at the fictional coffee shop Central Perk in nearly every episode. Gilmore Girls, a popular show from the early 2000s, depicts the central characters Lorelai Gilmore and her daughter Rory frequently referencing their need for coffee, as well as enjoying coffee at their local diner, Lukes. In the NBC series Frasier, the characters are often seen drinking coffee at the fictional Café Nervosa, which is said to have been inspired by the real-life Elliott Bay Café in Seattle.

== See also ==
- Café society
- Coffee culture in former Yugoslavia
- Coffee in world cultures
- Coffee service
- List of coffeehouse chains
- List of coffee festivals
- Tea culture
