= Coffee production in Puerto Rico =

Aspect of the economy of Puerto Rico

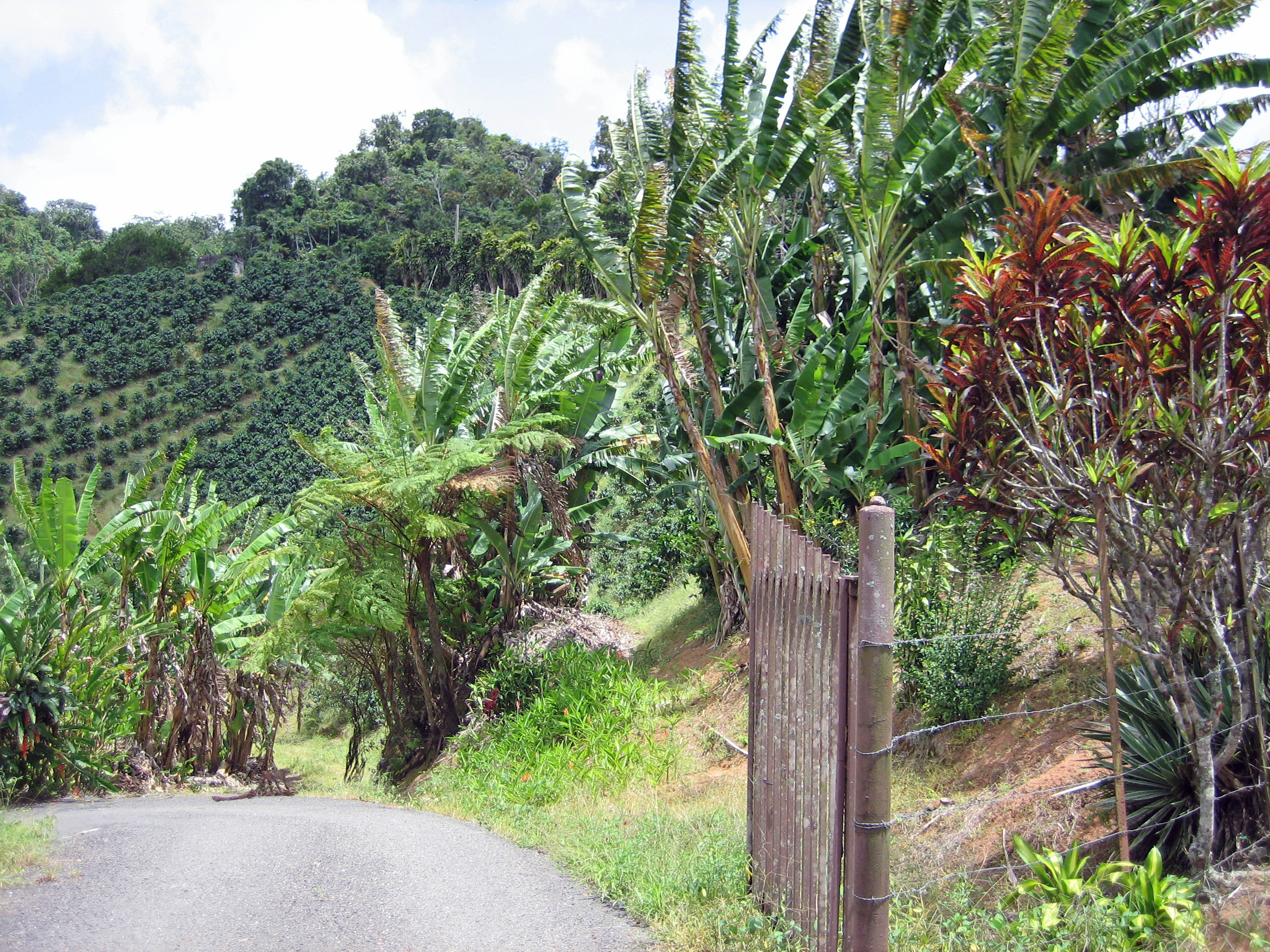
Coffee plantation in Puerto Rico

Coffee production in Puerto Rico has a checkered history between the 18th century and the present. Output peaked during the Spanish colonial rule but slumped when the autonomous island was ceded by Spain to the United States in 1898 and the devaluation of the Puerto Rican Peso forced Puerto Ricans to sell their land and become wage laborers instead. In recent years, the gourmet coffee trade has grown exponentially with many of the traditional coffee haciendas of the Spanish colonial period being revived. Puerto Rican coffee is characterized as smooth and sweet.

== History ==
Coffee was first introduced to Puerto Rico in 1736 as a minor cash crop during Spanish colonial rule from nearby Martinique, and was mostly consumed locally. By the end of the 18th century, the island produced more than a million pounds of coffee a year. By the late 19th century, coffee production peaked, and the island was the world's seventh largest producer of coffee. Utuado was the most prominent site in coffee production before 1898. This rapid rise in the quantity and quality of coffee produced in the island is attributed to immigrants from Europe who brought their expertise to bear on its growth.

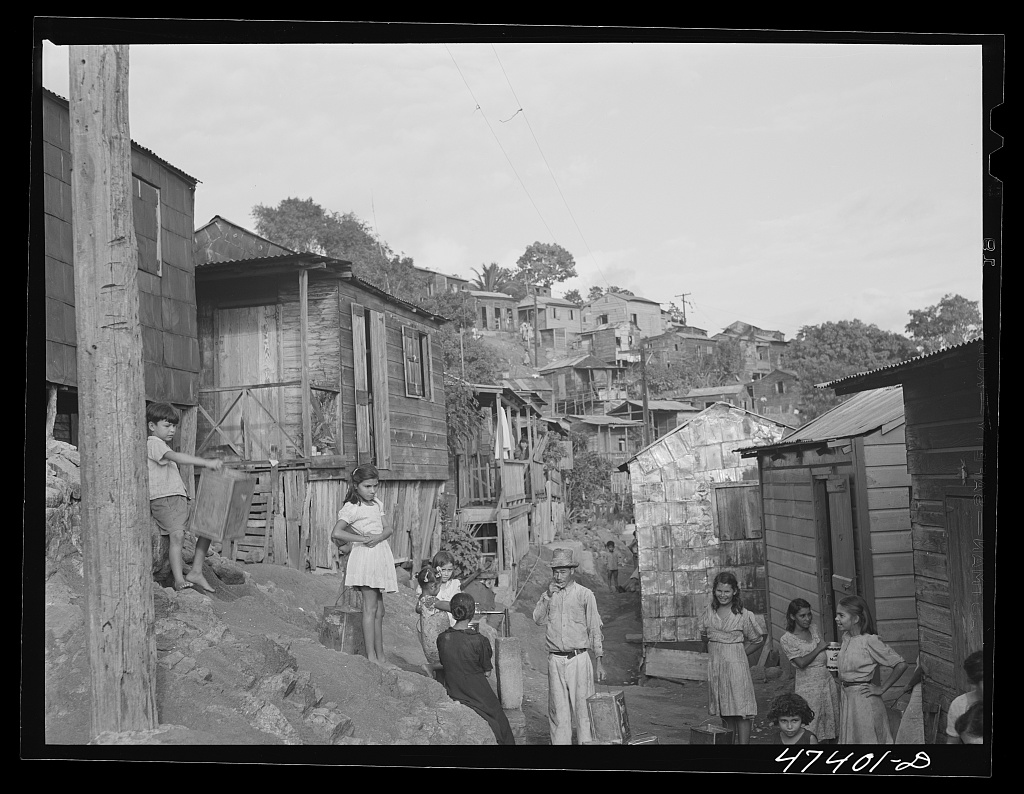
Slum area in coffee town Yauco

In 1898, the United States obtained the island from Spain, and it subsequently saw a decline in coffee production as emphasis moved towards growing sugar cane commercially. However, there is now a resurgence of coffee production, with the traditional hacienda estates reopening, and additional areas being brought under the crop. New coffee farms have started in the Cordillera Central where the nutrient content in the volcanic soil is conducive to high value production of gourmet coffee.

== Production ==
The island's coffee producing areas are spread throughout Puerto Rico, lying at an elevation range of 2,400–2,780 feet (730–850 m) in the western central mountainous terrain extending from Rincón to Orocovis. There is also potential for growing coffee in the higher elevations in places such as Ponce, with a peak of 4,390 feet (1,340 m) in elevation. The main areas which produce coffee are in the municipalities of Yauco, Adjuntas, San Sebastián, Lares, and Las Marías in the northwestern central part of the country. In recent years, production has been affected by factors such as cloud cover, climate change, high cost of production, and the effects of political unrest. It is also reported that about half of the crop remains unpicked because pickers are not available.

Coffea arabica is the main species of coffee grown; popular varieties are Bourbon, Typica, Pacas and Catimor. The local consumption accounts for one third of the produce. Coffee from the Dominican Republic and Mexico is also imported for commercial grade coffees for local consumption by fast foods and most small town cafeterias. However, the exported quantity is very limited.

== Coffee Harvest Celebrations ==
There are a number of celebrations and festivals that honor the end of the coffee harvesting season in Puerto Rico. Typically each major producing region has its own version of this.

The oldest and most celebrated annual coffee festival in Puerto Rico is the Yauco Coffee Festival or Festival del Café. Its inaugural year was 1975.

Other festivals which take place in Puerto Rico are:

- Fiesta del Acabe del Café (Adjuntas)
- Fiesta del Acabe del Café (Maricao)

== See also ==
- List of countries by coffee production

== Bibliography ==
- Van Atten, Suzanne (5 February 2013). Moon Puerto Rico. Avalon Travel Publishing. ISBN 978-1-61238-339-2.
- Barrier, Brooke (2008). Fodor's Puerto Rico. Fodor's Travel Publications. ISBN 978-1-4000-0731-8.
- Beisner, Robert L.; Hanson, Kurt W. (2003). American Foreign Relations Since 1600: A Guide to the Literature. ABC-CLIO. ISBN 978-1-57607-080-2.
- Moldvaer, Anette (1 July 2014). Coffee Obsession. DK Publishing. ISBN 978-1-4654-3476-0.
- Perez, Gina (4 September 2004). The Near Northwest Side Story: Migration, Displacement, and Puerto Rican Families. University of California Press. ISBN 978-0-520-93641-6.
