= Coffee production in Martinique =

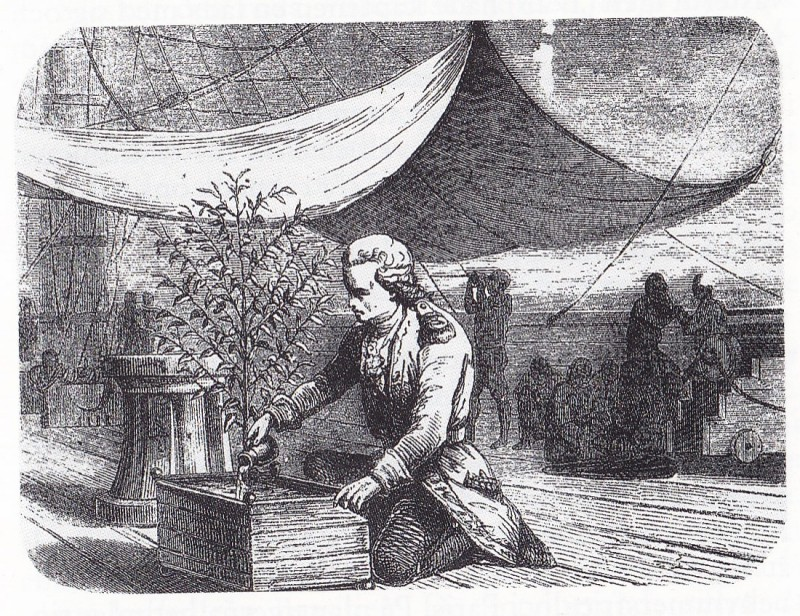
Gabriel de Clieu with coffee plant

Coffee production in Martinique dates to 1723 and its establishment is credited to the French naval officer Gabriel de Clieu. It later spread to other places in the Caribbean and South America from Martinique, an overseas region of France.

== History ==
Jules Rossignon wrote that in 1723, Royal Physician Pierre Chirac gave Gabriel de Clieu, a French navy lieutenant, a coffee tree to be planted in Martinique. In spite of King Louis XV refusing permission to do so, de Clieu took a cutting from a coffee plant in the royal gardens during a night time burglary and planted it in Martinique. He gave the seeds to De la Guarigue-Survillier, colonel of the Martinique militia, and to other inhabitants of the island, who planted them. Clieu faced many challenges while transporting the coffee plant, including a pirate attack and an Atlantic storm. The glass box in which the plant was being carried broke; and when faced with water shortage during the voyage he shared his water ration with the plant. After finally reaching his destination, he planted the crop, which grew and in a few years, coffee plantations were established in the Martinique.

Coffee plantations proliferated in Martinique, with some 18 million coffee trees planted, until the earthquake of November 7, 1727. The assiduity and perseverance of the settlers were such that this island produced by itself more coffee than was required for the consumption of the whole of France. From Martinique some coffee trees were sent to Santo Domingo, Guadeloupe, and other neighboring islands, and on to Central and South America.

== Production ==
According to the 2013 statistics of FAO, production of green coffee in the country was 25 tons from a cropped area of 30 ha with yield rate of 21,875 hectogram per ha.

== See also ==
- Economy of Martinique
- List of countries by coffee production

== Bibliography ==
- Pan American Union (1902). Coffee: Extensive Information and Statistics (Public domain ed.). U.S. Government Printing Office.
- Robertson, Carol (2010). The Little Book of Coffee Law. American Bar Association. ISBN 978-1-60442-985-5.
