= Kona Coffee Cultural Festival =

Food festival in Hawaii, US

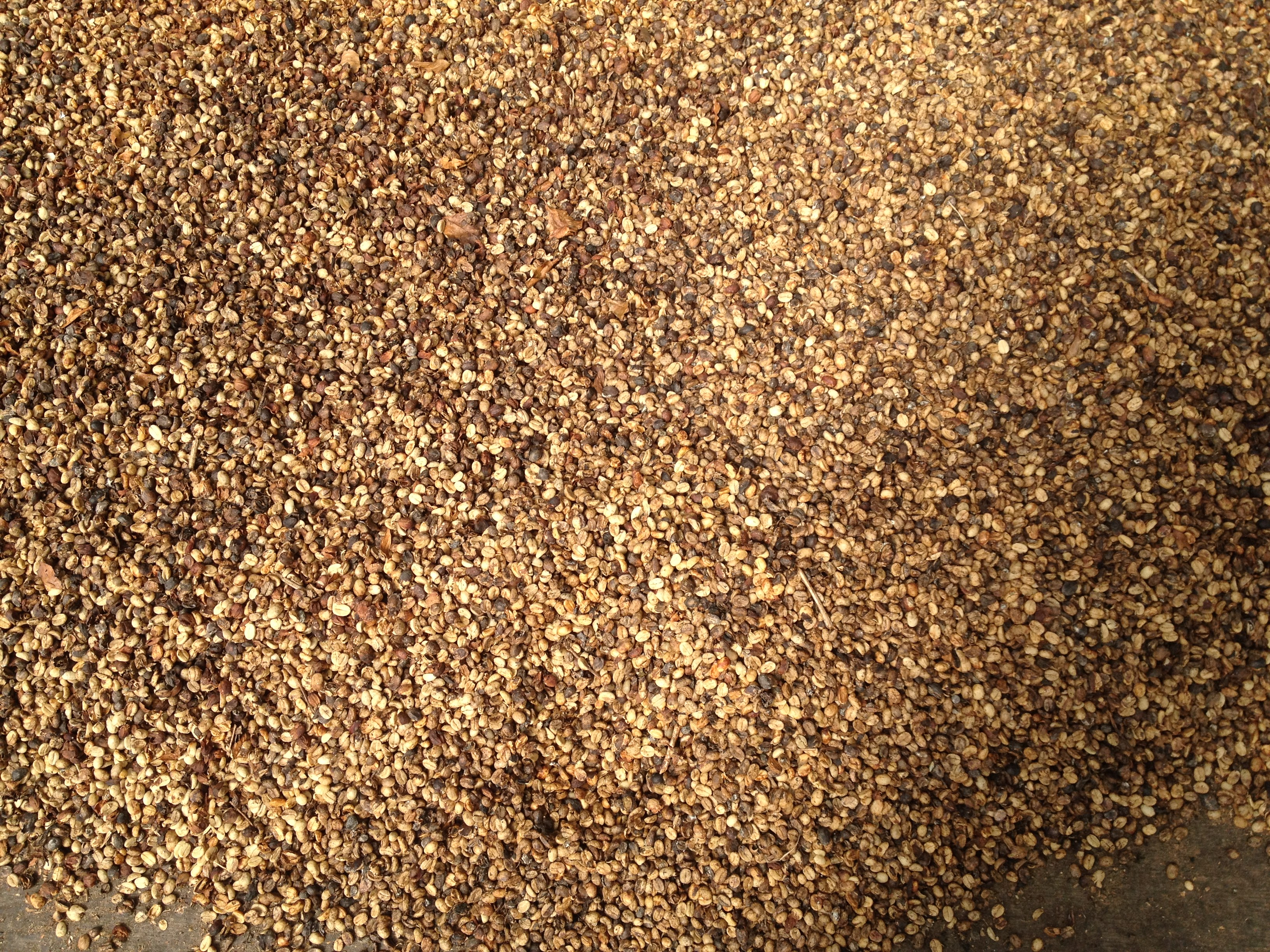
- Unroasted Kona coffee beans
- Nickname: Kona Coffee Fest
- Status: Active
- Genre: Food festival
- Date: November
- Frequency: Annually
- Locations: Kona, Hawaii, U.S.
- Inaugurated: 1970; 56 years ago
- Attendance: 16,000–18,000 (2008)
- Website: konacoffeefest.com

The Kona Coffee Cultural Festival is an annual festival celebrating Kona coffee and the cultural heritage of the coffee-farming communities of the Kona district on the Island of Hawaiʻi. The festival, which was first held in 1970, runs for ten days each November and has been described as the oldest food festival in Hawaii. Its events include a coffee cupping competition, the Miss Kona Coffee scholarship pageant, a lantern parade, farm tours, recipe and lei contests, and a hoʻolauleʻa.

== History ==
The Kona Coffee Cultural Festival began with a 1970 meeting in Hilo between the chamber of commerce and local businesspeople who discussed the possibility of creating a community event to draw visitors to the Kona coast. It was decided that the event should be focused on the area's best-known crop, Kona coffee. The early festivals were short events, typically only lasting a single day or a weekend, and were primarily targeted at visitors. In 1977, Norman Sakata, a local farmer who had attended the first festival, pressed for the festival to honor Kona's pioneer farmers. His advocacy resulted in the festival's tradition of naming elderly farmers and community figures as the parade's grand marshals. Other early organizers included Alfreida Fujita, who helped the festival promote foods and goods from Kona's ethnic communities.

In 1989 the festival was renamed from the "Kona Coffee Festival" to the "Kona Coffee Cultural Festival" to recognize the variety of cultures that make up Kona's heritage. The festival took on its current ten-day format in the early 1990s. In 2007 the festival was recognized as a major festival by the Hawaii Tourism Authority and, by 2008, the festival's annual attendance had reached 18,000 people. Mel Morimoto, a former manager of the Kona Coffee Living History Farm, became the festival's president in 2012. The festival consolidated to a single parade in 2011 and, in 2018, Valerie Corcoran stepped into the role of festival president. The 2020 festival was cancelled because of the COVID-19 pandemic. After a brief, four-day festival in 2021, the festival returned to full capacity in 2022.

== Events and organization ==
The festival hosts a number of recurring events every year. The Kona Coffee Cupping Competition is a blind tasting of coffees from local farms (typically between 50 and 80). Entries are scored on the Specialty Coffee Associations' 100-point scale. The festival runs a beauty pageant and scholarship competition to crown "Miss Kona Coffee" and "Miss Aloha Hawaii." The festival opens with a lantern parade which ends with a bon dance. The festival is run by a volunteer board of directors and a large number of community volunteers (between 500 and 1,000 every year).

== See also ==
- Coffee production in Hawaii
- Kona coffee
- List of coffee festivals
- Yauco National Coffee Festival
