= Coffee in Sweden =

Coffee was introduced to Sweden in the late 17th century, and today coffee plays a significant role in Swedish culture, characterised by Sweden ranking among the world's top coffee consumers per capita, and a distinct tradition of coffee breaks known as Fika.

== History ==
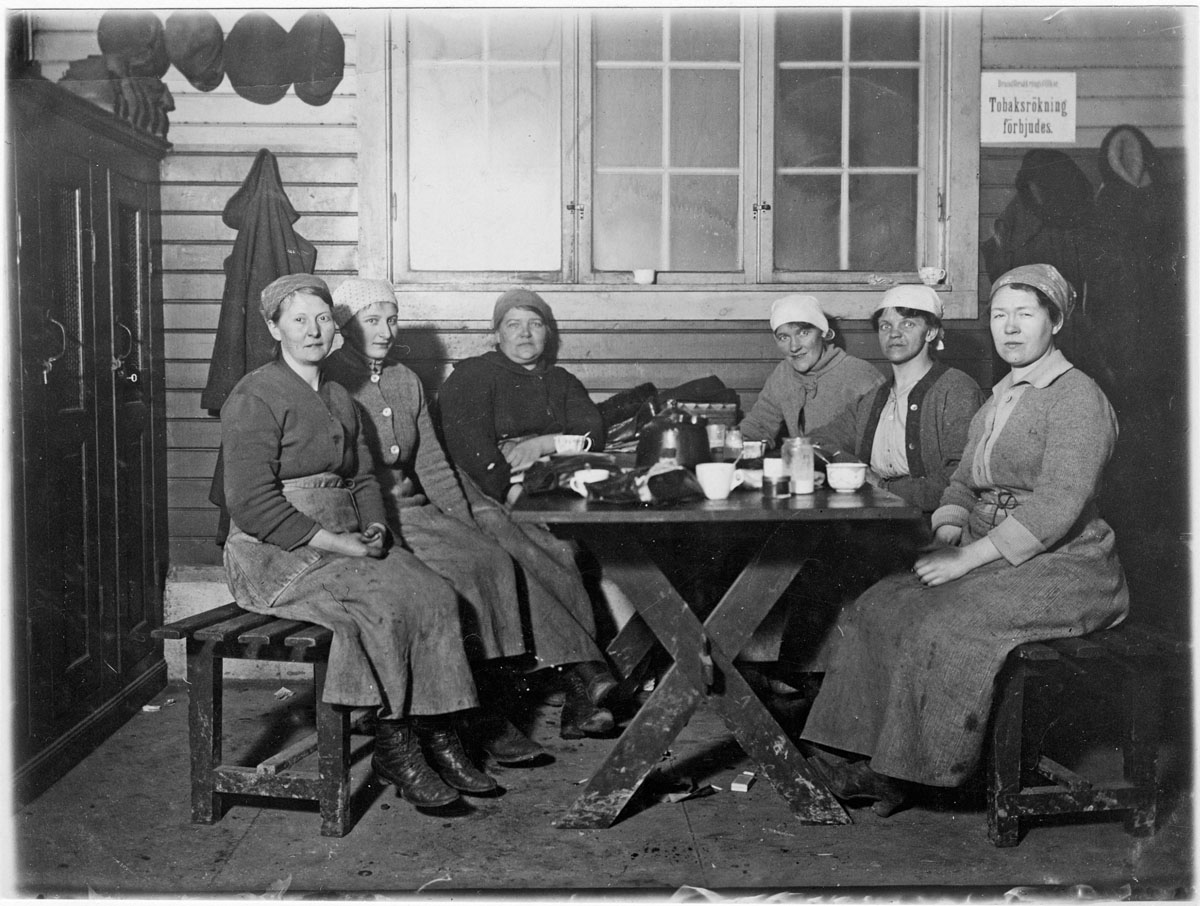
Cleaning women at coffee break in tram depot, Stockholm 1930

=== Early history ===
Coffee was introduced to Sweden in the mid-17th century. In 1657, Swedish diplomat Claes Rålamb encountered coffee during a diplomatic mission to Constantinople. He described it as a "cooked drink of beans" consumed hot. Despite this early mention, coffee did not gain immediate popularity in Sweden.

The first recorded shipment of coffee arrived in 1685 in Gothenburg. Initially, coffee was regarded as a medicinal product and was sold in pharmacies. Its high cost restricted consumption to the wealthier classes. King Charles XII, during his stay in the Ottoman Empire in the early 18th century, developed a taste for coffee and introduced Turkish coffee-making practices upon his return, contributing to its spread in Sweden.

=== Restrictions ===
Coffee consumption faced opposition in its early years. Critics such as Carl Linnaeus warned of its health effects, advocating for herbal alternatives, while economic concerns, including the negative balance of trade caused by the importing of exotic 'luxuries' including coffee, led to government bans. King Gustav III opposed coffee, commissioning an experiment on its effects. Between 1756 and 1823, coffee was prohibited on five occasions, but these bans were largely ineffective. Coffee consumption continued, with underground societies known as "coffee guilds" forming during prohibition periods. Restrictions ended in 1823.

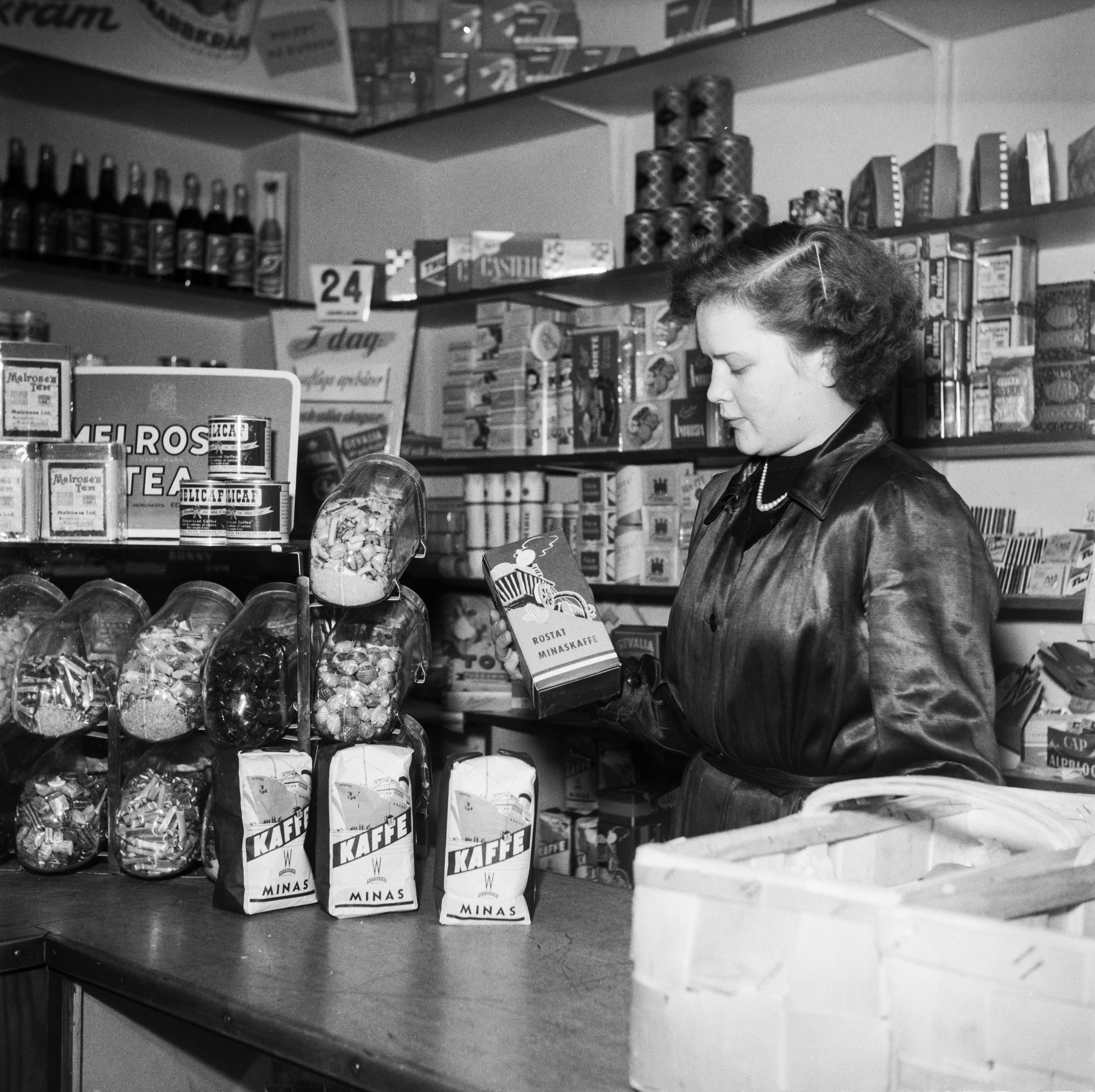
Coffee for sale in a Swedish shop 1951

=== Widespread popularity ===
Coffee gradually gained popularity in Sweden, becoming a staple by 1850, even among the working class and rural poor. While brännvin (vodka) could be home-distilled, coffee beans had to be imported. As a result, rural Swedes often consumed coffee-based or coffee-like beverages up to five times a day, stretching their supplies with local substitutes such as dried chicory, grains mixed with syrup, or a dough made from rye and potatoes.

Around this time, the temperance movement and new alcohol regulations transformed Swedish drinking culture. Alcohol consumption during work hours became socially unacceptable, with coffee replacing it as the drink of choice for workers. This shift led to a café boom, with Stockholm hosting nearly 800 cafés by 1887.

The introduction of the iron stove in the 19th century made home coffee brewing accessible, and coffee became central to Swedish households. The cultural tradition of Fika began to emerge during this time.

== Coffee culture in Sweden today ==
=== Fika ===
A fika follows the offering of the Mass at Engelbrekt Evangelical-Lutheran Church in Stockholm.

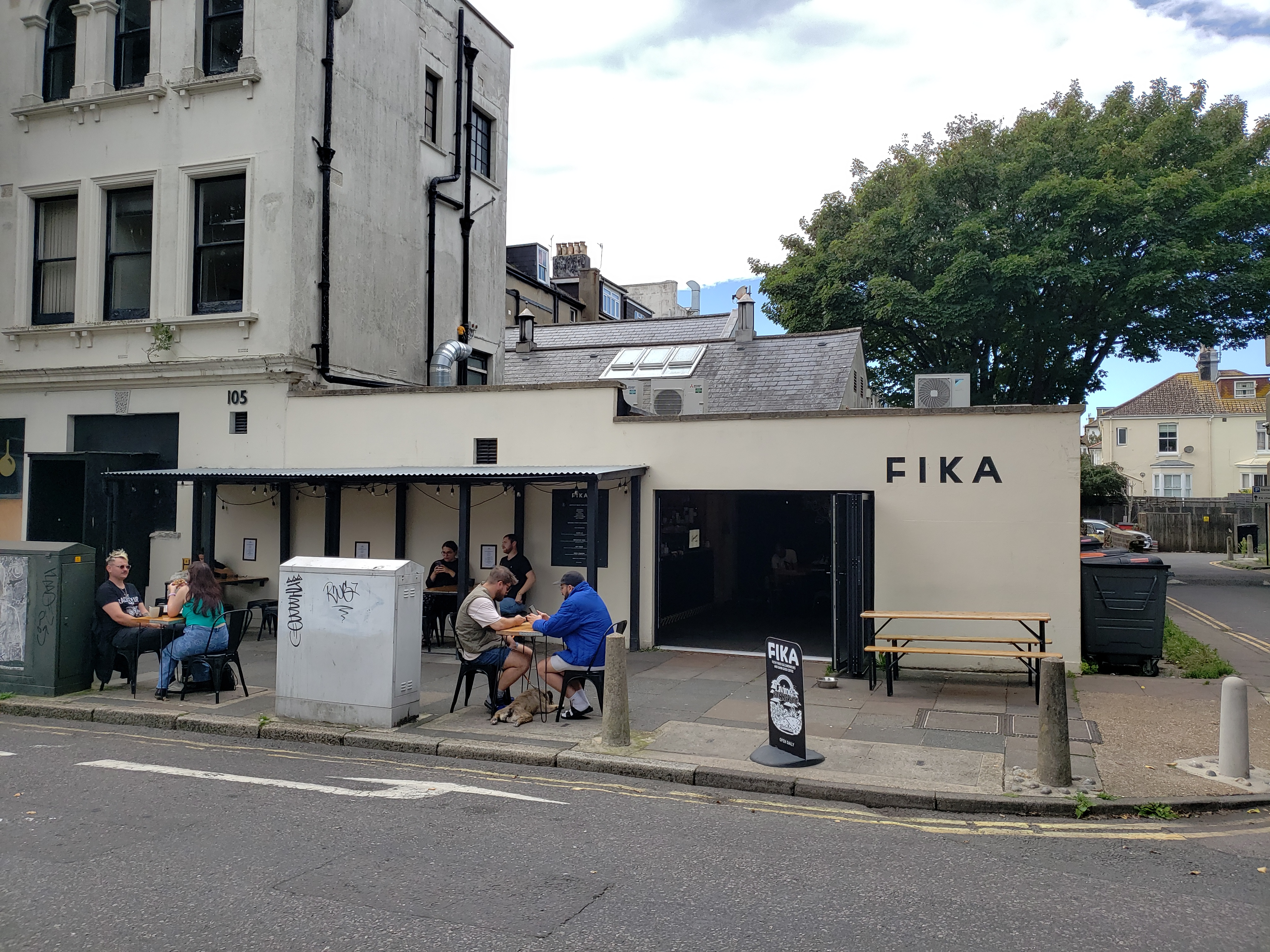
A Swedish-themed café called Fika in Brighton, England

Fika is a well-established tradition within Swedish coffee culture, characterised by a designated break during which individuals consume coffee, typically accompanied by buns or pastries, in a social setting. The origin of fika is after the conclusion of Mass on Sundays at church, as a form of Christian fellowship. The temperance movement in Sweden led to the popularity of coffee over alcohol. At present, fika is regarded as a social institution that encourages pausing from daily tasks. It is commonly observed after church services, at workplaces, at homes, as well as at cafes across Sweden. The practice, derived from a slang inversion of the word 'coffee' (Swedish: kaffe), has historical roots dating back to the late 19th century. Traditionally, fika takes place at set times, such as mid-morning and mid-afternoon, though in contemporary settings it can occur more informally. Some Swedish workplaces facilitate fika through designated communal spaces, and in some cases, fika breaks are explicitly included in employment contracts. The coffee consumed during fika is often accompanied by pastries such as cinnamon buns or other baked goods, including seasonal items like saffron buns and semla, though savoury options may also be included.

In the 21st century, the concept of fika has gained international recognition, with cafes inspired by the tradition opening in cities around the world. It has also been linked to workplace productivity, as studies suggest that regular breaks contribute to efficiency and well-being.

In Swedish workplaces, coffee and tea are universally provided free of charge for all staff, forming the foundational provision for the fika practice—a dedicated break typically observed in the midmorning or midafternoon, with no formal agenda attached. The food and refreshments accompanying workplace fika vary in provision: they may include baked or store-bought pastries, or homemade items such as sandwiches and fresh fruit brought in by employees. In Sweden's healthcare sector, a distinct fika provision model is common: workplaces supply coffee, tea and pre-prepared sandwiches for staff, with the associated costs deducted directly from employees' salaries.

=== Consumption ===
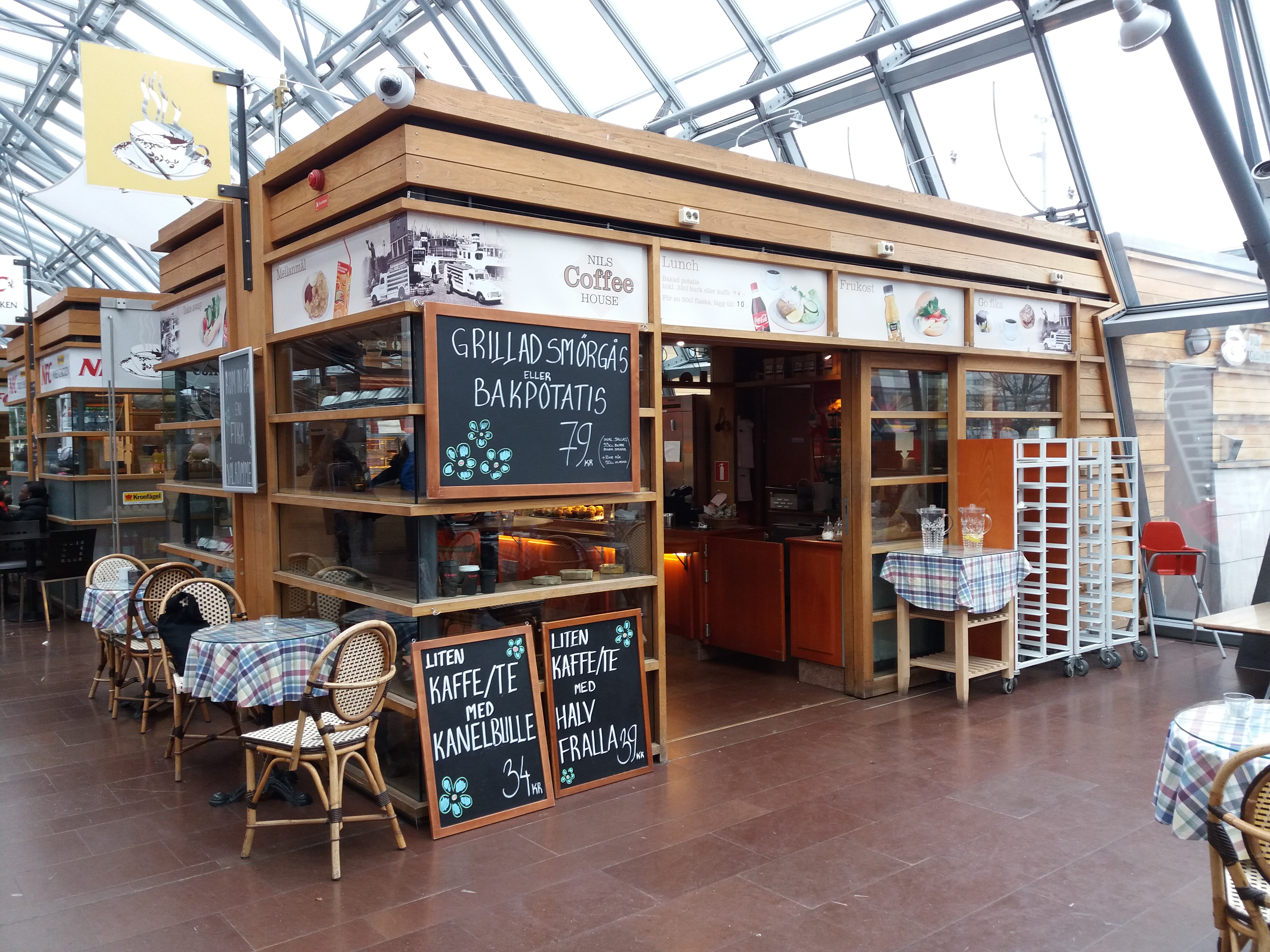
A coffee shop in Gothenburg

Sweden is among the highest coffee-consuming countries globally, with an average consumption of approximately 8.2 kg (18 lb) per capita annually. Brewed coffee remains the most popular preparation method, although espresso-based drinks have gained traction.

Another historic coffee preparation method in Sweden, still common in the Northern Sweden, is "kokkaffe", or boiled coffee. This process involves adding water and coarsely ground coffee to a pot or pan, bringing it to a boil, and then straining it into a cup or flask.

Swedes generally prefer medium to dark roasts, and the popularity of speciality coffee has grown in recent years. Cafés featuring artisanal brewing methods and micro-roasteries have become more common.

== Industry ==
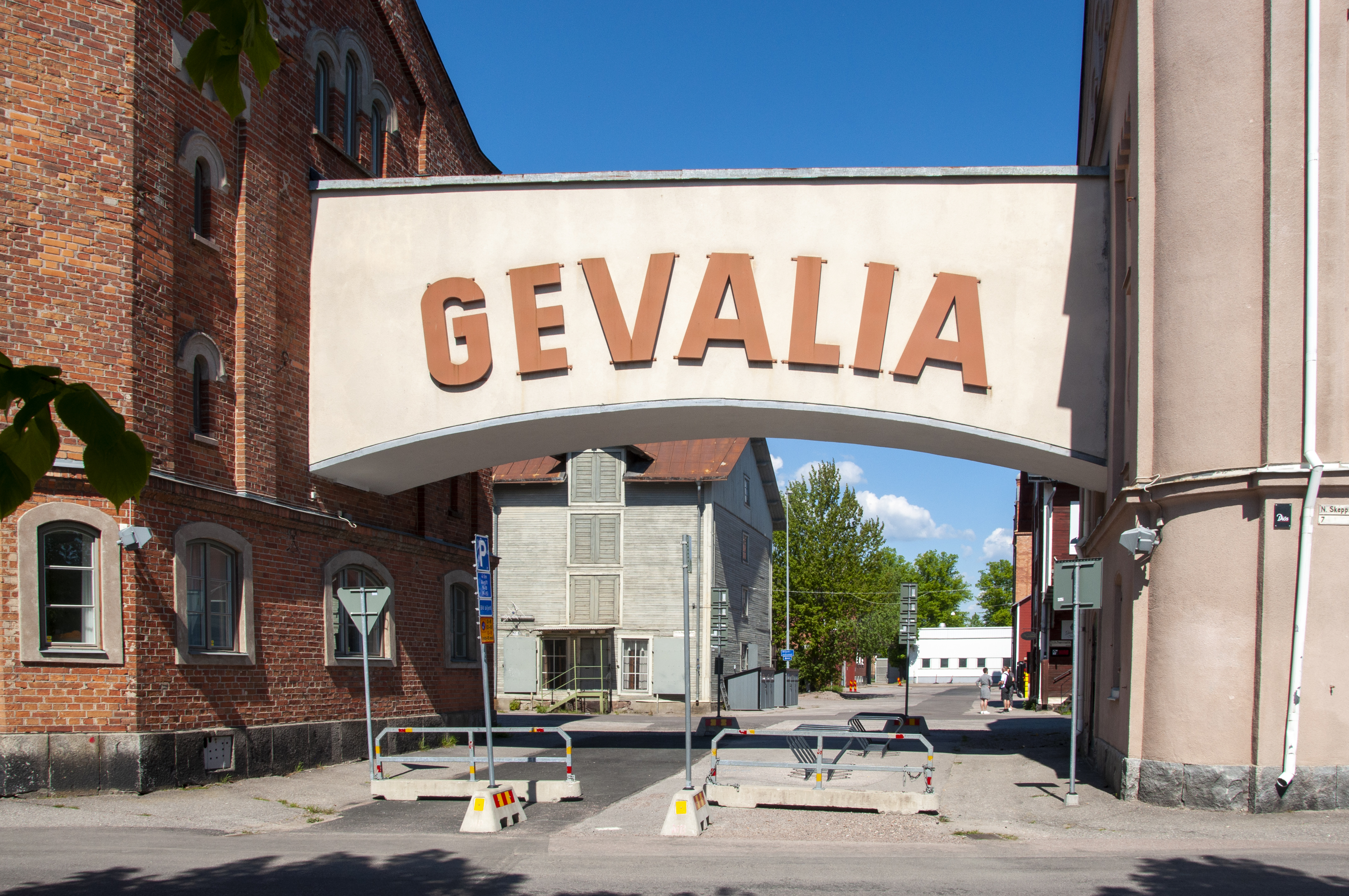
Gevalia coffee roastery in Gävle

Sweden's coffee industry has an annual roasting volume of approximately 88,000 tonnes, accounting for about 5% of the European Union's total. The industry includes a mix of large-scale roasters and smaller micro-roasteries.

Four major companies dominate the Swedish coffee market:

- Gevalia, owned by JDE Peet's, based in Gävle, holds around 40% of the market share.
- Zoégas, owned by Nestle, located in Helsingborg, accounts for approximately 20% of the market.
- Löfbergs, headquartered in Karlstad, has about a 15% share.
- Arvid Nordquist, based in Stockholm, holds around 9% of the market.

These companies primarily import green coffee beans through the ports of Gothenburg and Gävle. Smaller roasters and micro-roasteries, specialising in speciality coffee, account for the remaining market share.
