= Pierre Chirac =

French physician (1650–1732)

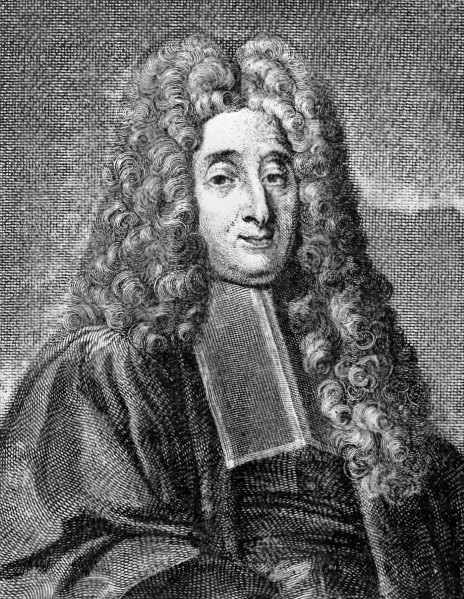
- Born: 1650; Conques, Guyenne, France
- Died: 1 March 1732 (aged 81–82); Marly-le-Roi, France
- Education: Jesuit college in Rodez
- Occupation: Physician
- Known for: Member of the German National Academy of Sciences Leopoldina
- Notable work: Observations sur les incommodités auxquelles sont sujets les équipages des vaisseaux, et de la manière de les traiter
- Awards: Knighted in 1728

Pierre Chirac (1650 in Conques – 1 March 1732 in Marly-le-Roi) was a French physician and member of the German National Academy of Sciences Leopoldina. He was a Superintendent of the Royal Garden of Medicinal Plants in 1718 and was knighted in 1728 then appointed first physician to Louis XV in 1730.

== Life and career ==
He received his education in Jesuit college in Rodez. After completing these studies, at the age of 28, he went to Montpellier in 1678 to study theology. As private tutor he mentored Isaac Carquet, a pharmacist's son, who received his medical doctorate in 1684. Chirac also took a liking to medicine, left the clergy and enrolled in 1680 to study medicine. Soon he was hired by Michel Chicoyneau, Chancellor of the Faculty of Medicine, as tutor for his children. During his studies, Chirac focused on anatomy, in which he expanded his knowledge to such an extent that he was allowed to teach courses in this subject himself, even before he was a doctor of medicine.

On 3 February 1686 Pierre Chirac with the nickname Orion I was elected a member of the German National Academy of Sciences Leopoldina. From 1699 he was a member of the Académie des sciences.

=== Physician in Catalonia and Rochefort ===
Through the intercession of his colleague Charles de Barbeyrac (1629–1699) to Marshal Anne-Jules de Noailles, who was to command the royal army in Catalonia, Chirac managed in 1692 to obtain the post of doctor in that army. In 1715, he succeeded Wilhelm Homberg as the prince's first doctor.

== Publications ==
- Extrait d'une lettre écrite à Mr. Regis l'un des quatre commis pour le Journal des Sçavans. Sur la structure des cheveux, Montpellier, Gontier, 1688, in-12.
- Dissertatio academica - An incubo ferrum rubiginosum - Dissertation académique - Faut-il employer le fer rouillé contre le cauchemar ?, Montpellier, 1692, in-12
- Dissertatio academica - An passioni iliacæ globuli plumbei hydrargyro præferendi - Dissertation académique - Contre la douleur abdominale, les billes de plomb sont-elles préférables au mercure artificiel ?, Montpellier, 1694, in-12. L'auteur se prononce pour la négative. Il explique assez exactement l'invagination intestinale
- De motu cordis : adversaria analytica - Du mouvement du cœur : essai analytique [archive], Montpellier, 1698, in-12
- Lettres sur l'apologie de Vieussens, Montpellier, 1698, in-8°. L'illustre anatomiste Raymond Vieussens se flattait d'avoir démontré le premier l'existence d'un acide dans le sang. Chirac revendique cette découverte purement imaginaire.
- Quaestio medico-chirurgica - Utrum absoluta vulnerum suppuratione ad promovendam cicatricem praestent detergentia salino-aquea sarcoticis aliis oleosis & pinguibus quibuslibet medicamentis - Question médico-chirurgicale - Est-ce qu'en cas de suppuration complète des plaies, pour favoriser la cicatrisation les nettoyants salino-aqueux l'emporteraient sur les autres régénérants huileux et n'importe quels médicaments gras
- Observations sur les incommodités auxquelles sont sujets les équipages des vaisseaux, et de la manière de les traiter. Paris, 1724, in-8°
