= Gustav III of Sweden's coffee experiment =

Twin study

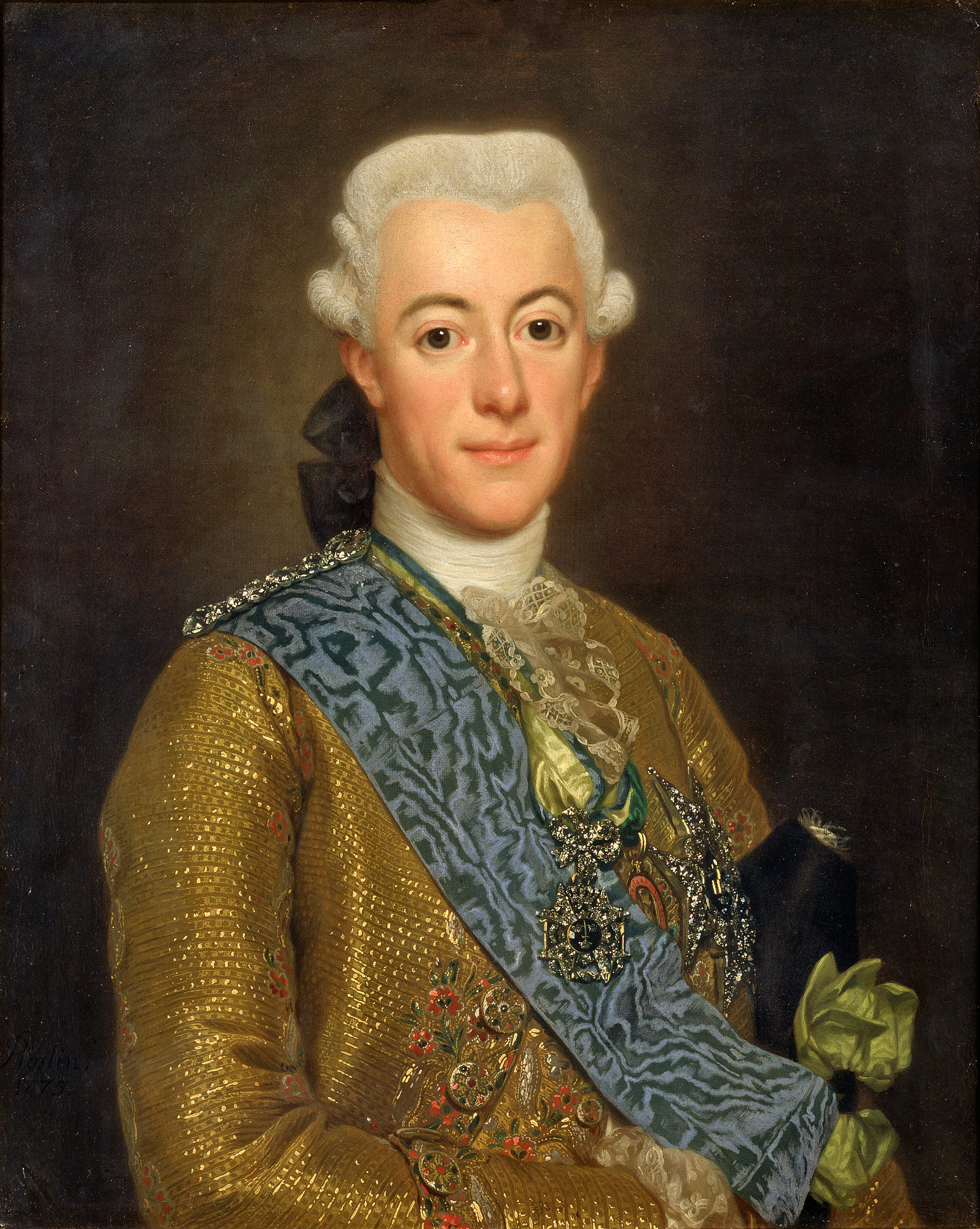
Gustav III of Sweden (1746–1792) was determined to prove the negative health effects of coffee.

Gustav III of Sweden's coffee experiment was a purported twin study ordered by Gustav III to study the health effects of coffee. The authenticity of the event has been questioned. The primitive medical study, supposedly conducted in the second half of the 18th century, failed to prove that coffee was a dangerous beverage.

== Background ==
In Sweden, coffee was banned by royal decree across three different reigns, in five separate periods between the 1750s and the 1820s: 1756–61, 1766–69, 1794–6, 1799–1802 and 1817–1823.

Coffee first arrived in Sweden around 1674, but was little used until the turn of the 18th century when it became fashionable among the wealthy. In 1746, a royal edict was issued against coffee and tea due to "the misuse and excesses of tea and coffee drinking". Heavy taxes were levied on consumption, and failure to pay the tax on the substance resulted in fines and confiscation of cups and dishes. Later, coffee was banned completely; despite the ban, consumption continued.

Gustav's father, Adolph Frederick, had also been an opponent of stimulating drinks, signing the Misuse and Excesses Tea and Coffee Drinking Edict in 1760. Both Gustav III and his father had read and been strongly influenced by a 1715 treatise from a French physician on the dangers of what would later be identified as caffeine in tea and coffee.

Gustav III viewed coffee consumption as a threat to the public health and was determined to prove its negative health effects. To this end he ordered a scientific experiment to be carried out in what has been loosely referred to as the first randomized controlled clinical trial.

== Experiment ==
The king ordered the experiment to be conducted using a pair of identical twins. Both of the twins had been tried for the crimes they had committed and condemned to death. Their sentences were commuted to life imprisonment on the condition that one of the twins drink three pots of coffee, and the other drink the same amount of tea, every day for the rest of their lives.

The tea drinking twin died first at the age of 83, long after the death of Gustav III, who was assassinated in 1792. The age of the coffee-drinking twin at his death is unknown, as both doctors assigned by the king to monitor this study predeceased him.

== Aftermath ==
In 1794, the government once again tried to impose a ban on coffee. The ban, which was renewed in 1799 and 1817, was never successful in stamping out coffee-drinking. Once the ban was lifted in 1823, coffee became a dominant beverage in Sweden, which since has been one of the countries with the highest coffee consumption per capita in the world.

== See also ==
- Coffee in Sweden
- Health effects of tea
- Health effects of caffeine
- History of coffee
- Fika
- Twin study
