= List of coffee festivals =

Notable coffee festivals and exhibitions

This is a list of notable coffee festivals around the world.

== Historic national and cultural coffee festivals ==
Name	Year	Location	Notes	Image
Feria de las Flores y del Café	1950	Boquete, Panama	Began as a coffee festival in 1950; became 'Feria de las Flores y del Café' in 1973.	
Fiesta Nacional del Café	1960	Calarcá, Quindío, Colombia	National coffee festival featuring the Reinado Nacional del Café.	
Kona Coffee Cultural Festival	1970	Kailua-Kona, Hawaii, USA	Established in 1970; the oldest continuously running coffee festival in the United States. Celebrates the heritage of Kona coffee over 10 days every November, featuring farm tours, cupping competitions, and cultural performances.	
Yauco Coffee Festival (Festival Nacional del Café de Yauco)	1975	Yauco, Puerto Rico	Puerto Rico's oldest coffee festival and second oldest continuously running festival in the United States. Annually between late February and early March. 50th anniversary edition celebrated in 2025.	
Sintercafé – International Coffee Week	1975	Costa Rica (San José/Playa Herradura)		
Coffee Fest	1992	Seattle, Washington, United States		
Expo Café México	1998	Mexico City, Mexico	Long-running national trade & consumer fair	
India International Coffee Festival (IICF)	2002	Bengaluru (rotates), India	Biennial festival organized by the Coffee Board of India since 2002.	
Seoul International Cafe Show	2002	Seoul, South Korea	East Asia's first large-scale coffee exhibition, held annually since 2002.	
Buôn Ma Thuột Coffee Festival	2005	Buôn Ma Thuột, Đắk Lắk, Vietnam	Biennial national festival; first held in 2005 (9th edition in 2025).	
London Coffee Festival	2011	London, United Kingdom	Flagship UK specialty coffee festival at Truman Brewery; acquired by William Reed in 2022.	
Expocafé Perú	2011	Lima, Peru	National platform for producers & brands; running since 2011.	
Melbourne International Coffee Expo – MICE	2011	Melbourne, Australia	Major industry expo; established 2012.	
Prague Coffee Festival	2012	Prague, Czechia (formerly Czech Republic)		
Istanbul Coffee Festival	2014	Istanbul, Türkiye		
Amsterdam Coffee Festival	2015	Amsterdam, Netherlands	Inaugural edition held in 2014; part of Allegra/LCF family of festivals.	
Independent Barcelona Coffee Festival (IBCF)	2015	Barcelona, Catalonia, Spain		
Berlin Coffee Festival	2015	Berlin, Germany		
Helsinki Coffee Festival	2015	Helsinki, Finland	Began in spring 2015; among the largest in Northern Europe.	
New York Coffee Festival	2015	New York, New York, USA		
Tokyo Coffee Festival	2015	Tokyo, Japan	Founded in 2015; biannual outdoor festival at United Nations University courtyard.	
Vienna Coffee Festival	2015	Vienna, Austria		
Athens Coffee Festival	2016	Athens, Greece	Large regional event	
Jakarta Coffee Week (Jacoweek)	2016	Jakarta, Indonesia	Launched in 2016; now attracts 30k+ visitors.	
San Francisco Coffee Festival	2016	San Francisco, California, USA	Launched in 2016; celebrates Bay Area roasters; separate from 'Coffee Fest' trade shows.	
Warsaw Coffee Festival	2016	Warsaw, Poland		
Malaysia Coffee Fest	2017	Kuala Lumpur, Malaysia	Inaugural national coffee fest in 2017 at KLCC.	
Milan Coffee Festival	2018	Milan, Italy		
Los Angeles Coffee Festival	2018	Los Angeles, California, USA		
Capetown Coffee Festival	2019	Capetown, South Africa		
Lisbon Coffee Festival	2019	Lisbon, Portugal		
Paris Café Festival	2019	Paris, France		
Swiss Coffee Festival	2019	Zurich, Switzerland		
Toronto Coffee Festival	2019	Toronto, Canada	Founded 2020; annual at Evergreen Brick Works.	
São Paulo Coffee Festival	2022	São Paulo, Brazil	Inaugural 2022 drew 12,000+ visitors.	
World of Coffee	2022	Dubai, United Arab Emirates	SCA's World of Coffee expanded to Dubai in 2022; annual trade event.	
Dublin Coffee Festival	2024	Dublin, Ireland		

== Coffee festivals by country ==
The following is an incomplete list of notable coffee festivals, expos or exhibitions, including both current and defunct festivals of note.

Australia:

- Melbourne International Coffee Expo – MICE

Brazil:

- São Paulo Coffee Festival

Colombia:

- Fiesta Nacional del Café (Calarcá, Quindío)

Czech Republic:

- Prague Coffee Festival

Finland:

- Helsinki Coffee Festival

France:

- Paris Café Festival

Germany:

- Berlin Coffee Festival

Greece:

- Athens Coffee Festival

India:

- India International Coffee Festival (IICF)

Indonesia:

- Jakarta Coffee Week (Jacoweek)

Ireland:

- Dublin Coffee Festival

Italy:

- Milan Coffee Festival

Japan:

- Tokyo Coffee Festival

Malaysia:

- Malaysia Coffee Fest

Mexico:

- Expo Café México

Netherlands:

- Amsterdam Coffee Festival

Panama:

- Feria de las Flores y del Café (Boquete)

Peru:

- Expocafé Perú

Poland:

- Warsaw Coffee Festival

Portugal:

- Lisbon Coffee Fest

Puerto Rico (U.S. Territory):

- Festival Nacional del Café (Yauco)
- Fiesta del Acabe del Café (Adjuntas)
- Fiesta del Acabe del Café (Maricao)
- Coffee & Chocolate Expo

Saudi Arabia:

- Saudi Coffee Festival

South Africa:

- Cape Town Coffee Festival

South Korea:

- Seoul International Cafe Show

Spain:

- Independent Barcelona Coffee Festival (IBCF)

Switzerland:

- Swiss Coffee Festival

United Arab Emirates:

- World of Coffee Dubai
- Dubai International Coffee & Tea Festival (DICTF), started in 2009 now defunct since 2020

United Kingdom:

- London Coffee Festival

United States:

- Kona Coffee Cultural Festival (Hawaii)
- New York Coffee Festival
- Los Angeles Coffee Festival
- San Francisco Coffee Festival
- NJ Coffee Festival (New Jersey)
- Columbus Coffee Festival (Ohio)
- CoffeeCon (traveling consumer festival)
- Coffee Fest (Seattle)

Vietnam:

- Buôn Ma Thuột Coffee Festival
