= Gabriel de Clieu =

French naval officer

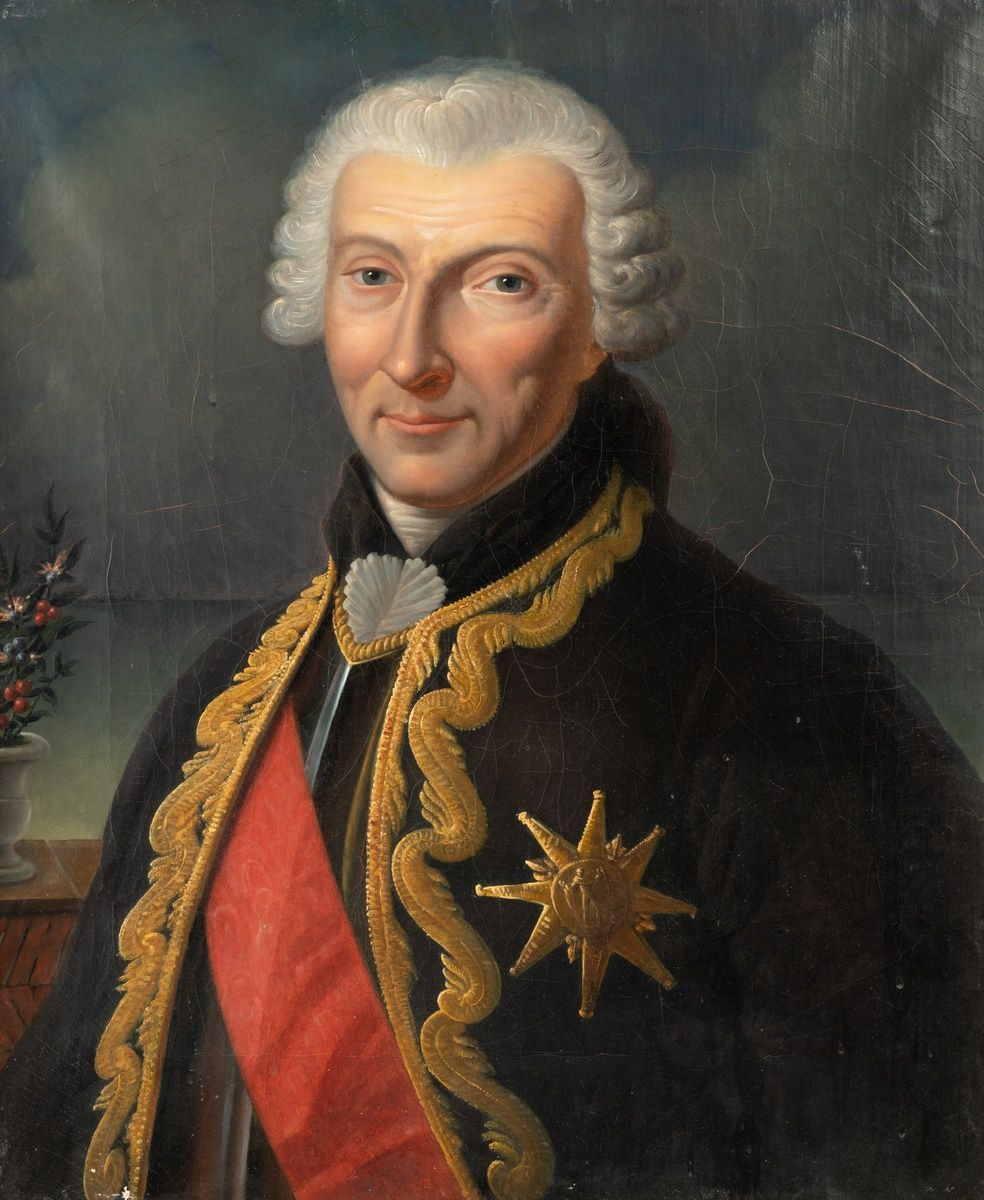
Portrait of Gabriel de Clieu

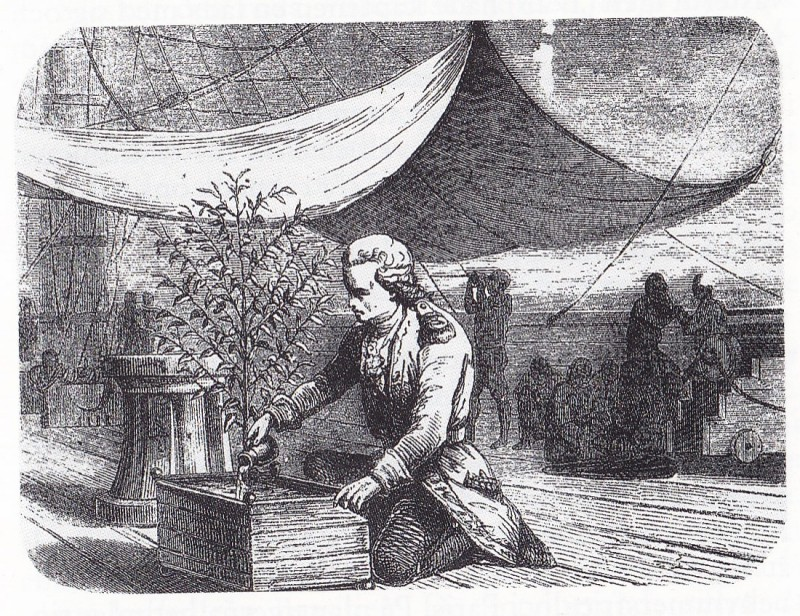
Gabriel de Clieu with coffee plant

Gabriel-Mathieu Francois D'ceus de Clieu (c. 1687 – 29 November 1774) was a French naval officer and the governor of Guadeloupe from 1737 to 1752 and the founder of Pointe-à-Pitre. He was awarded the rank of commander of the Royal and Military Order of Saint Louis.

De Clieu is celebrated for his claim to have introduced coffee to the French colonies of the Western Hemisphere in the 1720s and his support for its cultivation.

== Introduction of coffee to Martinique ==
De Clieu was born in Dieppe.While Di Clieu was not the first to transport coffee plants to the Caribbean islands, he is largely credited due to close timing and his dramatic journal accounts. The story of his introduction of coffee comes from his account in the Année littéraire of 1774. According to this account, he arranged to transport three offshoots from coffee plants from the greenhouses of the Jardin royal des plantes (which had originally received two plants from lieutenant général d'artillerie M.Ressou who brought them back from Holland in 1713) to Martinique in 1720. According to de Clieu's account, water was rationed on the voyage, and he shared his ration with the seedlings. The story is repeated in many histories of coffee. However, a recent history points out that though it may well be true that de Clieu brought a seedling to Martinique, and perhaps even that he shared his water ration with it, coffee was already growing in the Western Hemisphere: in the French colony of Saint-Domingue since 1715 and in the Dutch colony of Surinam since 1718.

== Museum ==
De Clieu died in Paris. His descendants in Dieppe plan to open a museum to commemorate the legend of De Clieu.
