= Yauco National Coffee Festival =

Annual festival in Yauco, Puerto Rico

Yauco National Coffee Festival Festival Nacional Del Café de Yauco
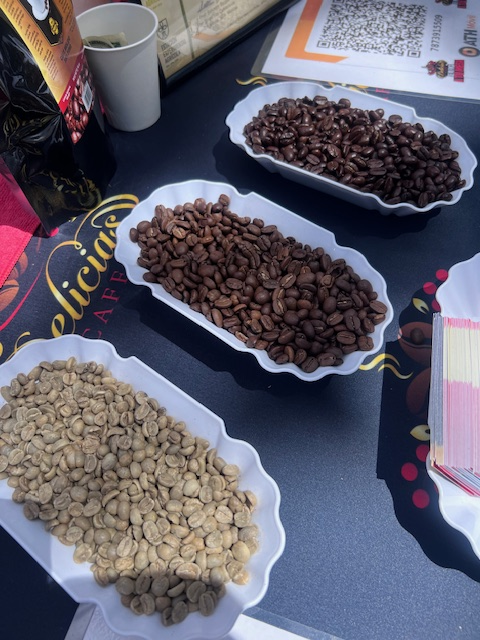
- Nickname: Coffee Festival, Yauco coffee fest
- Status: Active
- Genre: Festival
- Begins: February 22, 2026
- Ends: March 1, 2026
- Frequency: Annually
- Location: Fernando de Pacheco y Matos Public Plaza of Yauco
- Country: Puerto Rico
- Years active: 51
- Inaugurated: 1975
- Website: https://www.yaucofestivaldelcafe.org/en/home/

The Yauco National Coffee Festival (Spanish: Festival Nacional del Café de Yauco or simply Festival del Café) is an annual celebration held in Yauco, Puerto Rico, that honors the region's robust coffee-growing heritage. Located in a mountainous area ideal for growing high-quality beans, Yauco has long been known for its coffee production.

The coffee festival typically takes place in late February to early March and brings together local coffee farmers, roasters, artisans, and visitors for a vivid mix of coffee tastings, farm tours, workshops, music, food and craft markets. It celebrated its first event in 1975 making it the oldest coffee festival in Puerto Rico. 2025 was its 50th anniversary.

Beyond simply showcasing beans, the festival serves as a cultural and economic anchor for the community. Visitors can sample local coffee varieties, observe barista demonstrations and processing methods, and enjoy performances of Puerto Rican music and dance.

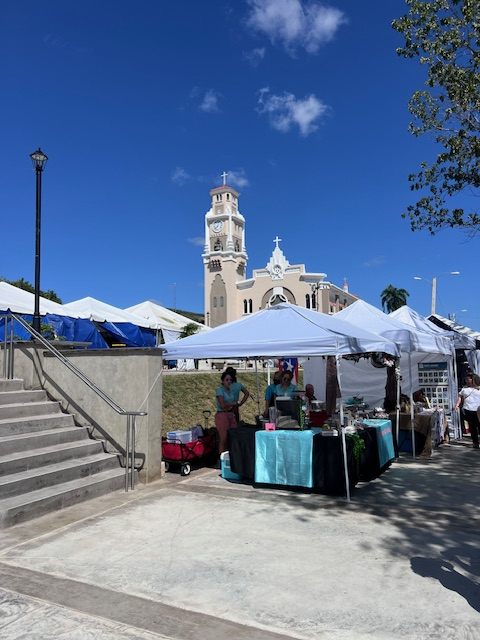
Artisans in the Plaza

== See also ==
- Coffee production in Puerto Rico
- List of coffee festivals
