= Encyclopedia of the Harlem Renaissance =

The Encyclopedia of the Harlem Renaissance (Facts On File Publishing ISBN 0-8160-4539-9 and ISBN 1-4381-3017-1) by Sandra L. West and Aberjhani, is a 2003 encyclopedia of the lives, events, and culture of the Harlem Renaissance of the 1920s to 1940s. An ebook edition was published through Infobase Publishing in 2010.

== Additional authors ==
In addition to the hundreds of articles written by West and Aberjhani, the Encyclopedia also includes an extended foreword by Clement Alexander Price. The founder and director of the Institute on Ethnicity, Culture, and the Modern Experience at Rutgers University, Dr. Price in 2013 was appointed by Barack Obama to the presidential advisory council on historic preservation. Other key contributors to the volume are: Iris Formey Dawson, Vaughnette Goode-Walker, Ja A. Jahannes, Karen E. Johnson, and Mary C. Lewis.

== Reception ==
Acknowledged as the first encyclopedic volume on the subject, Encyclopedia of the Harlem Renaissance upon publication received generally favorable reviews. Essence Magazine featured the title in its Christmas and Kwanzaa gift-giving guide, the Times of Trenton described it as, "a fascinating guide to a colorful and culturally productive era in African-American history," and the Rudolph Fisher Newsletter called it, "an outstanding reference resource highly recommended for libraries of all sizes." In February 2006, Black Issues Book Review voted the encyclopedia one of its “essential titles for the home library.” In addition, both the American Reference Books Annual, and Libraries Unlimited’s Recommended Reference Books for Small and Medium-sized Libraries and Media Centers, list the Encyclopedia among its highly suggested titles.

== Awards ==
Awards it has received include the Choice Academic Title Award, the "Best History Book Award", and the "New Jersey Notable Book Award" 1999-2005.

== Impact on field of study ==
Since its initial hard copy release in paperback and hardback editions in 2003, Encyclopedia of the Harlem Renaissance has prompted an increase in studies of the Jazz Age era. Some of these studies have taken the form of novels and plays set in the era while others have resulted in new biographies of key players in the renaissance. In addition to being cited in numerous scholarly journals the encyclopedia has also become a resource for diverse authors who continue to expand and extend the field of study. The following is a partial list of titles that reference the volume:

- African-American Holidays, Festivals, and Celebrations: The History, Customs, and Symbols Associated with Both Traditional and Contemporary Religious and Secular Events Observed by Americans of African Descent by Kathlyn Gay (Omnigraphics Publishing, 2007).
- African-American Literature Overview and Bibliography by Paul Q. Tilden (Nova Science Publishers, 2003)
- Die Harlem Renaissance in Los Angeles 1920-1940 by Jennifer Gladbach (GRIN Verlag Pub, Jan 16, 2017
- Encyclopedia of the African Diaspora: Origins, Experiences, and Culture 3-volume set by Boyce Davies and Carole Elizabeth (ABC-CLIO Publishing, 2008)
- Ebony Rising: Short Fiction of the Greater Harlem Renaissance Era by Craig Gable (Indiana University Press, 2004)
- Greenwood Encyclopedia of African American Literature: U-Z, The by Hans A. Ostrom and J. David Macey (Greenwood Publishing, 2005).
- Harlem Speaks: A Living History of the Harlem Renaissance by Cary D. Wintz (Sourcebooks MediaFusion Pub; with CD edition, 2006)
- Interdisciplinary Bibliographic Guide to Black Studies by GK Hall. (GK Hall Publisher, 2004).
- Music Musique: French and American Piano Composition in the Jazz Ageby Barbara Meister (Indiana University Press, 2006)
- Political Aspects of “The New Negro” by Christoph Ellssel (GRIN Verlag Pub, 2008)
- Teaching the Harlem Renaissance: course design and classroom strategies by Michael Soto (Peter Lang Inc., International Academic Publishers; 2nd ed. edition 2008)

== Key 100th-anniversary source document ==
Beginning with the 2011 essay titled “The Approaching 100th Anniversary of the Harlem Renaissance” the encyclopedia has been a key document in the call for official international commemorations of the Harlem Renaissance Centennial.

== See also ==
- Aberjhani
- Harlem Renaissance
- W.E.B. Du Bois
- Zora Neale Hurston
- Langston Hughes
- Wallace Thurman
- Jean Toomer
