= Aberjhani =

Author

- Born: Jeffery J. Lloyd; July 8, 1957 (age 69)
- Citizenship: United States
- Education: Savannah State University, Eckerd College, Macalester College, Temple University, New College of California
- Occupations: Poet, writer, columnist, historian, artist
- Known for: Encyclopedia of the Harlem Renaissance, The River of Winged Dreams, columns on literature and politics
- Movement: Harlem Renaissance scholarship
- Awards: Choice Academic Title Award (2004), Academy of American Poets member (2007), PEN American Center member (2012), Red Room Hall of Fame (2009), Savannah Poet and Spoken Word Artist of the Year (2006)

Aberjhani (born Jeffery J. Lloyd July 8, 1957) is an American poet, writer and columnist. He is well known for his blog articles on literature and politics, and as co-author of Encyclopedia of the Harlem Renaissance and author of The River of Winged Dreams. The encyclopedia won a Choice Academic Title Award in 2004.

== Early life and education ==
Aberjhani grew up in Savannah, Georgia. Upon graduating from Savannah High School in 1975, he studied journalism, creative writing, and the American community at a variety of colleges: Savannah State College (now University); Eckerd College in St. Petersburg, Florida; Macalester College in St. Paul, Minnesota; Temple University in Philadelphia; and the New College of California in San Francisco. He completed additional studies in journalism at the Fort Benjamin Harrison School of Journalism in Indianapolis, Indiana.

== Career ==
Aherjhani has also worked as historian, novelist, artist, and editor.

=== Military service ===
He served a two-year tour of duty with the U.S. Air Force in Fairbanks, Alaska; four years in Suffolk, England; and another two years with the USAF Reserves in Charleston, South Carolina. He studied Equal Opportunity and Human Relations Counseling at the Defense Equal Opportunity Management Institute at Tyndall AFB, Florida.

=== Literary career ===
The author took the name Aberjhani as an adult: he says that it came to him in a dream. He continued writing while in the Air Force. He later served from 1994 until 2001 as co-editor of the Savannah Literary Journal. During the same period, he served as a literary reviewer for the Georgia Council for the Arts and held various position with the Poetry Society of Georgia, the oldest such literary organization in the state, and became well known as both a spoken word poet and published author. His national debut came in 1997 with ESSENCE Magazine's publication of his cover story/essay "This Mother's Son." The magazine at the time commanded a circulation of 7 million readers. From 1999 to 2005 his poems appeared regularly in ESSENCE, making him one of the most well-known poets in the United States.

Aberjhani has said in interviews that he has been influenced more by literary movements than by individual writers. He co-edited an encyclopedia on the Harlem Renaissance, a major 20th-century movement. But others have included Modernism in general, Surrealism, the Beats, the Black Arts Movement, Postmodernism, and Existentialism. He has also gone on record as being influenced at different periods by the following authors: James Baldwin, Albert Camus, W.E.B. Du Bois, Henry Dumas, Ralph Ellison, William Faulkner, Khalil Gibran, Langston Hughes, Zora Neale Hurston, Federico Garcia Lorca, Dambudzo Marechera, Henry Miller, James Alan McPherson, with whom he shares the same hometown and was featured in the Literary Savannah anthology, Toni Morrison, Anaïs Nin, Jalal al-Din Rumi, Jean-Paul Sartre, Alice Walker, and Margaret Walker.

=== Works as visual artist ===
The writer made his debut as a visual artist with a photographic documentation of the impact of Hurricane Matthew on the Historic District of Savannah in 2016. The series included a black and white image originally titled "Eugene Talmadge Memorial Bridge the Morning After Hurricane Matthew No. 2" and which was used to help promote efforts to change the bridge's name Savannah Tribune, "Renaming The Talmadge Bridge: A Free Public Discussion Moderated By The Honorable Dr. Otis S. Johnson" (Aug 16, 2017). In 2018 he created the compositional art technique and subsequent body of work named after it called "Silk-Featherbrush Artstyle." His art is featured extensively in the book Dreams of the Immortal City Savannah and on the cover of Greeting Flannery O'Connor at the Back Door of My Mind.

== Accomplishments ==
- 2006, Aberjhani won a Readers Poll: Savannah Poet and Spoken Word Artist of the Year Award, conducted by Connect Savannah.
- 2007, Accepted as member of The Academy of American Poets
- 2009, he was inducted into the Red Room Hall of Fame; Red Room is an online writers community and marketing site based in San Francisco.
- In 2011 he received a "Michael Jackson Tribute Portrait", or VIP DOT by the artist David Ilan.
- 2011, Listed as one of "The New Black" published in Best American Poetry, Diann Blakely author, June 13 online edition.
- 2012, Became a member of PEN American Center, an affiliate of the worldwide PEN International organization.
- 2014, Received and accepted invitation from LinkedIn administrators to join its selection of members and "influencers" publishing on the website.
- 2019, Poem "Suzannian Algorithm Finger-Painted on an Abstract Wall" published in 5-Decade Retrospective Catalog commemorating the life and career of Suzanne Jackson and in conjunction with exhibition at Telfair Museums Jepson Center for the Arts.

== Humanitarian causes ==
Aberjhani founded the online Creative Thinkers International community in September 2007 to support creative nonviolent conflict resolutions in the face of escalating warfare and terrorism following 9/11. Consisting of more than 500 independent artists from around the globe, the community maintains forums on such issues as Human Liberties Around the World and the potential role of the cultural arts in helping to maintain international peace. In March 2013 he announced his support for the September 2013 Global March for Peace and Unity Event. In January 2014 he signed the international Charter for Compassion. He later as a member contributed articles on Boko Haram, guerrilla contextualization, and social media ethics to the nonprofit organization's Voices Compassion Education Project. In 2016 he joined the Span the Gap Movement advocating that the name of the Eugene Talmadge Memorial Bridge be changed to one less racially inflammatory. The author first addressed the issue the 2007 memoir The American Poet Who Went Home Again.

== Bibliography ==
=== History and memoir ===
- Encyclopedia of the Harlem Renaissance (nonfiction; 2003 and 2010, with Sandra L. West and Clement Alexander Price, Facts on File/Infobase Publishing) ISBN 0-8160-4539-9
- The Wisdom of W.E.B. Du Bois (biography, quotations; 2003 and 2010, Kensington Books and Open Road Media Philosophical Library Series) ISBN 0-8065-2510-X
- The American Poet Who Went Home Again (memoir; 2007, Black Skylark Singing) ISBN 978-1-4357-1769-5
- Journey through the Power of the Rainbow: Quotations from a Life Made Out of Poetry (literary reference, quotations; 2014, Black Skylark Singing) ISBN 978-1-312-19411-3 and ISBN 1-312-19411-1
- Dreams of the Immortal City Savannah (memoir/history; 2019, Cyberwit.net Publishing) ISBN 978-9388125956
- Greeting Flannery O'Connor at the Back Door of My Mind: Adventures and Misadventures in Literary Savannah (literary criticism/memoir; 2020, Black Skylark Singing with Lulu Press) ISBN 1-716-68481-1

=== Novel ===
- Christmas When Music Almost Killed the World (novel; 2007, Black Skylark Singing) ISBN 978-1-4357-3420-3
- Songs from the Black Skylark zPed Music Player (reissue; 2019, Amazon Kindle Direct Publishing) ISBN 9781977037473

=== Short fiction and poetry collections ===
He has self-published works about childhood experiences in Savannah in both prose and poetry as well as being published by different small and university presses.

- I Made My Boy Out of Poetry (short fiction and poetry; 1997/2003, Washington Publications/ iUniverse Publishing) ISBN 0-595-15765-3
- Visions of a Skylark Dressed in Black (poetry; 2006, BSE-Publishing) (short stories and poetry; 2012, 1st U.S. Edition, Black Skylark Singing) ISBN 978-0-9662356-4-7
- The Bridge of Silver Wings (poetry; 2007, Black Skylark Singing) ISBN 978-0-557-06324-6
- Elemental the Power of Illuminated Love featuring paintings by Luther E. Vann (art and poetry; 2008, Telfair Museum of Art and Soar Pub) ISBN 0-9721142-7-0
- The River of Winged Dreams (poetry; 2010, Bright Skylark Literary Productions) ISBN 978-0-557-50288-2

=== Online columnist ===
The Digital Clarity Group's Examiner.com, under the umbrella of the Anschutz Company and AXS Entertainment, hosted Aberjhani's National African-American Art Examiner column from July 2009 until June 2016. His topics have included fine art and artists' biographies, as well as reports on contemporary politics, social network trends, and popular culture. He is noted for a series of articles on the life and death of Michael Jackson, the controversial case of Georgia death-row prisoner Troy Anthony Davis, the presidency of Barack Obama, and the United Nations' 2011 International Year for People of African Descent. His Notebook on Black History Month 2012 series covered historical and contemporary subjects including included Whitney Houston, Angela Davis, and Harry Belafonte.

=== Articles and essays ===
- Authors Lee Harper's and Toni Morrison's New Books Likely to Influence Millennials' Dialogues on Race, Bright Skylark Literary Essay, Feb 2015
- A Writer's Journey to Selma Alabama, LinkedIn Pulse Essay, Jan 2015
- Text and Meaning in Michael Jackson's Xscape (album) AXS Entertainment, 5-part Series, June 2014
- Gifts of the Poets: Eugene B. Redmond and Coleman Barks, Networked Articles, April 2014.
- Text and Meaning in Martin Luther King Jr.'s I Have a Dream Speech, Red Room Networked Articles, August 6, 2013.
- World-class Musicians Honor Turkey's Long Relationship with Jazz Red Room Networked Articles, May 1, 2013.
- This Is Why Hip-hop Icons Like LL Cool J Tweet Positive Quotes Creative Spirit of the Harlem Renaissance, March 19, 2013.
- Guerrilla Decontextualization and the 2012 Presidential Election Campaign, Red Room Authors & PEN American Center, July 30, 2012
- Poetics of Paradigm Dancing in the 2012 Presidential Election Campaign, PEN American Center, June 6, 2012
- "Trayvon Martin, Robert Lee, and Millions of Tears Fallen", editorial on the killing of Trayvon Martin
- Notebook on Black History Month 2012 (Part 4): The Black Power Mixtape 1967-1975, Author Blog, Feb 15, 2012.
- Savannah Talks Troy Anthony Davis Article Series, Red Room Author Blog, July 2009 – 2011.
- "Looking at the World through Michael Jackson's Left Eye" Michael Jackson Tribute Portrait, Aug 29, 2011
- "What Death of Osama bin Laden Indicates about Barack Obama's Leadership," Examiner, May 2, 2011.
- "Black History Month: What Would Du Bois Do Today?" AOL Black Voices, Feb 23, 2011.

=== Selected titles as editor ===
- Savannah Literary Journal (1994–2001, Savannah Writers Workshop) ISSN 1070-6194
- What Leaders Believe (Polk and White; 2010, Mountain State Univ Press) ISBN 978-0-9799836-1-0
- Savannah, Immortal City, Vol. 1 Civil War Savannah Series (Sheehy, Wallace, and Goode-Walker; 2011, Emerald Book Co.) ISBN 978-1-934572-70-2
- Savannah: Brokers, Bankers, and Bay Lane, Vol. 2 Civil War Savannah Series (Sheehy, Wallace, and Goode-Walker; 2012, Emerald Book Co.) ISBN 978-1-934572-69-6

=== Notable Anthology Inclusions ===
- Discover Savannah CD-ROM (digital travel guide edited by Angela Lain and Laura Lawton, Crisfield Multimedia, 1996).
- Literary Savannah (travel anthology edited by Patrick Allen, Trinity University Press; August 2011) ISBN 1595340769
- Black Gold: An Anthology of Black Poetry (edited by Ja A. Jahannes, Turner Mayfield Publishing, 2014) ISBN 0990555119

== See also ==
- Poetry Life and Times
