= Frederick Gale Ruffner Jr. =

American publisher (1926–2014)

- Born: August 26, 1926; Akron, Ohio, U.S.
- Died: August 12, 2014 (aged 87)
- Education: Ohio State University
- Occupation: Publisher
- Known for: Founder of Gale Research
- Notable work: Encyclopedia of Associations
- Spouse: Mary Evans Ruffner
- Children: Frederick G. Ruffner, III; Peter E. Ruffner

Frederick Gale Ruffner Jr. (August 26, 1926 – August 13, 2014) was an American publisher who is known as the founder of Gale Research.

He died August 12, 2014, at the age of 87.

== Publishing career ==
Ruffner founded Gale Research in 1954 while working as a market researcher for the General Detroit Corporation, a manufacturer of fire extinguishers and fire trucks.

Early Gale publications included the National Directory of Rack Jobbers and the National Directory of Trading Stamp Houses

His first major success was the Encyclopedia of Associations, (originally titled the Encyclopedia of American Associations) in 1956. Beginning with the third edition, the title was changed to the Encyclopedia of Associations.

Other major publications included Contemporary Authors and the Dictionary of Literary Biography.

Ruffner sold Gale to Thomson in 1985.

In 1985, Ruffner founded the publishing company Omnigraphics with his son Peter.

In 1986, Ruffner founded the Literary Landmarks Association as a project of Friends of Libraries USA to recognize historic sites related to major literary figures and events. The project continues after the merger of the American Library Trustee Association and Friends of Libraries USA to United for Libraries.

Ruffner was awarded American Library Association Honorary Membership in 1987.

== Military career ==
Ruffner enlisted in the U.S. Army at the age of seventeen and fought at Saipan and Okinawa during World War II.

He was awarded the Bronze Star Medal for Valor and the Combat Infantryman Badge.

== See also ==
- Encyclopedia of Associations
- Contemporary Authors
- Dictionary of Literary Biography
