= Paul Robeson: Speak of Me as I Am =

Paul Robeson - Speak of Me As I Am
- Directed by: Rachel Hermer
- Written by: Lou potter
- Produced by: A BBC Wales/New Jersey Public Television
- Starring: Paul Robeson; Pam Grier (Narrator)
- Cinematography: Ross Keith
- Edited by: Jinx Godfrey
- Music by: Bill Toles
- Distributed by: Kultur Video
- Release date: 1998
- Running time: 58 minutes
- Country: United States
- Language: English

Paul Robeson - Speak of Me As I Am is a 1998 documentary film directed by Rachel Hermer. It is a co-production of BBC Wales/New Jersey Public Television series produced by Richard Trayler-Smith and Max Pugh, about the life of singer, actor and activist, Paul Robeson. It features rare extensive archival footage of Robeson in the former Soviet Union, including footage of Robeson at Yalta with Nikita Khrushchev and many of Robeson's homes and landmarks as they look today. There are also interviews with Robeson's two main biographers, Lloyd Brown and Martin Duberman. As of 2009, Paul Robeson - Speak of Me As I Am is the most extensive documentary on Paul Robeson that the BBC has ever been involved with.

== Cast ==
- Paul Robeson
- Pam Grier (narrator)
- Martin Duberman
- Lloyd Brown
- Oscar Peterson, Jr.
- Sterling Stuckey
- Jefferey C. Stewart
