= Clement Alexander Price =

American historian (1945–2014)

- Born: October 13, 1945; Washington, D.C., U.S.
- Died: November 5, 2014 (aged 69)
- Education: University of Bridgeport; Rutgers University-New Brunswick
- Employer: Rutgers University-Newark
- Notable work: Freedom Not Far Distant: A Documentary History of Afro-Americans in New Jersey (1980); Many Voices, Many Opportunities: Cultural Pluralism and American Arts Policy (1994); and the three volume Slave Culture: A Documentary Collection of the Slave Narratives from the Federal Writers' Project
- Title: Board of Governors Distinguished Service Professor of History at Rutgers University-Newark; founding director of the Institute on Ethnicity, Culture, and the Modern Experience at Rutgers; the vice chair of President Barack Obama's Advisory Council on Historic Preservation; the chair of Obama's transition team for the National Endowment for the Humanities; a member of the Scholarly Advisory Committee of the Smithsonian's National Museum of African American History and Culture; a trustee of the National Trust for Historic Preservation; City of Newark Historian; chair to the New Jersey State Council on the Arts, and chair to the board of the Save Ellis Island Foundation
- Spouse: Mary Sue Sweeney
- Awards: Board of Governors Distinguished Service Professor of History at Rutgers University-Newark
- Website: Price Institute

Clement Alexander Price (October 13, 1945 – November 5, 2014) was an American historian. As the Board of Governors Distinguished Service Professor of History at Rutgers University-Newark, Price brought his study of the past to bear on contemporary social issues in his adopted hometown of Newark, New Jersey, and across the nation. He was the founding director of the Institute on Ethnicity, Culture, and the Modern Experience at Rutgers; the vice chair of President Barack Obama's Advisory Council on Historic Preservation; the chair of Obama's transition team for the National Endowment for the Humanities; a member of the Scholarly Advisory Committee of the Smithsonian's National Museum of African American History and Culture; and a trustee of the National Trust for Historic Preservation. Price is the namesake of the jazz club Clement's Place.

He was appointed City of Newark Historian in early 2014. His service to New Jersey included appointments by Governors Brendan Byrne and Thomas Kean to the New Jersey State Council on the Arts, on which he served as chair for two terms, and by Governor Christine Todd Whitman to the board of the Save Ellis Island Foundation, which he also chaired.

On November 2, 2014, Price succumbed to a catastrophic cerebral hemorrhage while speaking in New Brunswick at a Rutgers Jewish Film Festival screening of Joachim Prinz: I Shall Not Be Silent, a film project in which he had participated. Rabbi Bennett Miller shared the podium and recounted Price's final words in response to a question about the future of civil rights in the U.S.: "I still have hope." Price died on November 5, never having regained consciousness.

The John Cotton Dana Library at Rutgers-Newark holds Price's personal library and archives.

== Early life and education ==
Price was born on October 13, 1945, in Washington, D.C., the middle child of James Leo Price Sr., who was employed by the United States Department of the Treasury, and Anna Christine (Spann) Price, a home maker through much of his childhood, and later a domestic worker and professional seamstress. His older brother, James Leo Price Jr., a distinguished school principal (retired), returned to South Carolina to raise his family. Younger sister Jarmila Louise Price-Gaines, a director of music education programs, resides in California. Price's parents had both been participants in the Great Migration of African Americans from the American South in the early twentieth century. They evaded Jim Crow by moving to northern cities in search of better employment and educational opportunities for their children.

Price felt fortunate to be brought up in Northeast Washington's Brentwood community surrounded by family and friends and the close-knit fellowship of Israel Metropolitan C.M.E. Church. He attended Washington's McKinley Tech High School, where he was an accomplished distance runner on the school's track team and competed in cross country and mile run events. Also, with his brother, he home delivered the major Washington, D.C. newspapers.

He earned bachelor's and master's degrees at the University of Bridgeport, and received a PhD in History at Rutgers University-New Brunswick. He cited as inspiration and mentors such founding historians of the African-American experience as W. E. B. Du Bois, John Hope Franklin, August A. Meier and Sterling Stuckey.

== Personal life ==
In 1988, Price married Mary Sue Sweeney, now director emerita of the Newark Museum.

== Career ==
=== Academia ===
Price was encouraged to enter the field of African American History by his graduate advisor at the University of Bridgeport, Bruce M. Stave. As a doctoral candidate at Rutgers University-New Brunswick, Price began researching Newark's and New Jersey's African-American history, and taught for the 1968–69 academic year at the newly opened Essex County College. In February 1969, a group of black Rutgers University-Newark students occupied the campus's Conklin Hall, demanding increased enrollment of minority students and increased hiring of minority professors. As one result of the university's response to the students' demands, Price was hired and began teaching history at Rutgers University-Newark in the fall semester of 1969. He remained an active member of the history faculty until his death, including serving as director of the graduate program and chair of African and African-American Studies. In 2002, he was named Rutgers University Board of Governors Distinguished Service Professor.

Price's teaching and research focused on African-American history and culture; United States urban and social history; New Jersey history; public history; and American race relations. His dissertation, completed in 1975, was a social history of Newark's black community in the thirty years after World War I. Other writings include: Freedom Not Far Distant: A Documentary History of Afro-Americans in New Jersey (1980); Many Voices, Many Opportunities: Cultural Pluralism and American Arts Policy (1994); and the three-volume Slave Culture: A Documentary Collection of the Slave Narratives from the Federal Writers' Project.

In addition to his career at Rutgers University-Newark, Price was a scholar in residence at the Woodrow Wilson National Fellowship Foundation from 2001 to 2002; a visiting professor at Princeton University in 1996; a scholar in residence at Bloomfield College in 1990; a visiting professor at Montclair State College, Seton Hall University, New Jersey City University, Kean College of New Jersey, Fairleigh Dickinson University, and County College of Morris between 1975 and 1994; and an instructor of history at Essex County College in Newark from 1968 to 1969.

=== Newark ===
Price was a leading authority on Newark's history. The class he developed on the topic has been among the most popular at Rutgers University-Newark. He wrote extensively about the city's history, but also shared it in more direct ways with the public, via regular bus tours of the city and media appearances. "The Once and Future Newark with Clement Alexander Price", produced by Rutgers University-Newark and broadcast on New Jersey Network in 2006, has been reissued in 2015 in a special expanded commemorative version. In early 2014, Price was named the official historian of Newark. He served as chairman of the planning committee for Newark's 350th Anniversary, which took place in 2016.

At the time of his death, Price was chair of the Newark Trust for Education, a trustee of the Newark Public Library and of Saint Benedict's Preparatory School, a board member of the Geraldine R. Dodge Foundation, and chair of the Geraldine R. Dodge Poetry Festival committee. He had previously served as a trustee of the Newark Museum, the New Jersey Historical Society, and the New Jersey Symphony Orchestra, and as President of the Fund for New Jersey.

=== Public art and humanities ===
Price made public engagement an integral part of his scholarly activity, believing not only that scholarship should be made accessible to a broad American public but that the critical thinking and new ideas it fostered were essential to a more equitable and just development of Newark and the nation. Historical memory – whether produced by traditional academic scholarship, museums, or public monuments and historic sites – was at its best and most useful when it was most democratic and complicated.

Together with Gloria Hopkins Buck, Marjorie Fredericks and others, Price was a founding member in 1975 of the Newark Black Film Festival, the longest continuously running festival of its kind and widely admired. The 40th anniversary presentation in the summer of 2015 was dedicated to his memory.

With artist Larry Kirkland and landscape designer Robert Preston, he designed the Civil Rights Garden in Atlantic City, New Jersey, documenting the history and struggles of African Americans. Opened in 2002, this public art and history project of the Casino Reinvestment Development Authority has been called the most significant public commemoration of the modern civil rights movement in any northern state. He also served on the National Trust's advisory committee for the restoration of President Lincoln's Cottage at the Soldiers' Home in Washington, D.C., which opened in 2008.

== Price Institute on Ethnicity, Culture, and the Modern Experience ==
Price founded the Institute on Ethnicity, Culture, and the Modern Experience in 1997 at Rutgers University-Newark, an interdisciplinary academic center that, through public partnerships and programming, offers the Newark metropolitan area the finest thinkers and artists engaged with key issues of modern life. Its motivating belief is in the centrality of creativity and critical thinking to the continued revitalization of Greater Newark and the nation. The Institute is considered the culmination of his life's work, and works with community partners, scholars, and artists to bring the important civic issues in race, culture, and Newark into public discourse through public programming. The Institute was renamed for Price on February 20, 2015, as the Clement A. Price Institute on Ethnicity, Culture, and the Modern Experience.

The Marion Thompson Wright Lecture Series is presented by the Institute, one of the longest running Black History Month observances in the country. It was founded in 1981 by Price and Giles R. Wright, the inaugural director of the Afro-American History Program at the New Jersey Historical Commission. In 2015, the lecture series celebrated its 35th anniversary with the theme "Curating Black America", honoring the forthcoming opening of the Smithsonian's National Museum of African American History and Culture in Washington, D.C. The 36th Annual Marion Thompson Wright Lecture series will take place on February 20, 2016 and will explore criminal justice in the African American Experience. Among the lecturers in this series have been Sterling Stuckey, Max Roach, James Farmer, Esther Rolle, Ali Mazrui, Eric Foner, Basil Davidson and David Blight.

== Professional affiliations and appointments ==
Price was agency lead for the National Endowment for the Humanities on President Barack Obama's 2008 transition team. He was appointed twice by President Obama as vice chair of the Advisory Council on Historic Preservation, and appointed Newark City Historian in 2014 and as chairman of the 350th anniversary of Newark's founding in 1666. Price was also a member of the Scholarly Advisory Committee to the Smithsonian Institution's National Museum of African American History and Culture; a member of the advisory council for the Gilder Lehrman Institute of American History; a trustee of the National Trust for Historic Preservation; a trustee of the Geraldine R. Dodge Foundation; and former chairman of the Save Ellis Island Foundation and the New Jersey State Council on the Arts.

Some highlights of his significant public service contributions include:

- Member, American Antiquarian Society, Worcester, MA, 2013
- Panelist, "The Place of Community in Pluralistic Societies", National Endowment for the Humanities/Arts & Humanities Research Council workshop, Washington, D.C., March 30–31, 2011
- Member, Editorial board of the Journal of Community Engagement and Scholarship (JCES), University of Alabama, 2008–11.
- Participant, Project Interchange Seminar in Israel for the leadership of the Smithsonian Museum of African American History and Culture, December 2007 – January 2008.
- Chair, James A. Rawley Prize Committee, Organization of American Historians, 2005, Member 2004 and 2006.
- Director, New Jersey Council for the Humanities Teacher Institute, New Jersey Council for the Humanities, Monmouth University, July, 2004, 2005, 2006, 2007 and 2008.
- Guest Scholar, National Council for History Education Summer Seminar for Teachers, "Thinking Historically", Chaminade University, Honolulu, Hawaii, June/July, 2004.
- Commentator, "New Jerseytimes", radio series produced by Rutgers University, 1995–96.
- Trustee, St. Benedict's Preparatory School, 2013–
- Provisional trustee, Newark Watershed Conservation and Development Corporation
- Chair, Newark Trust for Education, June 2010 –
- Chair, Newark Education Task Force (appointed by New Jersey Education Commissioner Christopher Cerf), March 2011 – June 2011.
- Chair, the Newark Public Schools Superintendent Search Committee (appointed by Governor Corzine), December 2007 – June 2008
- Co-chair, The Newark [Rebellion] 40th Anniversary Commemorative Committee, aka The Big, Bad Committee, 2007
- Chairman, Sub-Committee for Arts & Culture, Mayor Cory Booker's Transition Committee, 2006
- President, Newark Public Schools Foundation, 2005–
- President, board of trustees, The Fund for New Jersey, 1998–2004; vice president, 1997
- Member, Newark Public Schools Advisory Board, 1997–99; vice president, 1999–2000
- Member, board of trustees, Newark Public Library, 1985–present, vice chairman, 1990–93
- Chairman, Mayor's Cultural Affairs Task Force, City of Newark NJ, 1986–87
- Trustee, New Jersey Symphony Orchestra, 1985–90
- Member, board of governors, New Jersey Historical Society, 1985–90
- Member, board of trustees, The Newark Museum, 1980–93
- Vice president, board of directors, Urban League of Essex County NJ, 1980–87
- Member, Newark Black Film Festival Steering Committee, 1977–
- Member, Advisory Committee for the Civil Rights History Project, Library of Congress, Smithsonian Institution's National Museum of African American History and Culture, 2010–.
- Vice-chair, New Jersey Lincoln Bicentennial Commission, 2008–09
- Member, the New Jersey State Advisory Committee to the United States Commission on Civil Rights, April 2008 – 2011
- Member, board of trustees, National Council for History Education, 2006
- Member, board of directors, Urban Libraries Council, Evanston, IL, 2003
- Chair, Research Advisory Council, Center for Arts and Culture, Washington, DC, and Trustee, 2002–04
- Member, National Advisory Board, National History Project, 2001–02
- Chairman, New Jersey State Council on the Arts, New Jersey Department of State, 1982–85

== Honors and awards ==
Price was the recipient of numerous awards for academic and community service, including: appointment as City of Newark Historian, 2014; The New Jersey Nets Basketball Black History Month award at the Prudential Arena in Newark, New Jersey, February, 2011; the Dr. Martin Luther King Jr. Leadership Award from Essex County in February, 2010; a Lifetime Achievement Award from Local Initiatives Support Corporation (LISC) New Jersey in November, 2008; and New Jersey Professor of the Year by The Council for Advancement and Support of Education (CASE) in 1999. In 2006, he was inducted into the Rutgers University Hall of Distinguished Alumni. He held honorary degrees from William Paterson University, Essex County College, New Jersey Institute of Technology, and Drew University.

Price also received:

- Thomas H. Kean and Brendan T. Byrne Civic Leadership Award, New Jersey Network Foundation, June 2, 2009
- Gail F. Stern Award, The New Jersey History Issues Convention, March 26, 2009
- Lifetime Achievement Award, Local Initiatives Support Corporation, (LISC) New Jersey, November, 2008
- Charles Cummings Award for outstanding contributions to local and state history, The Newark Preservation and Landmarks Committee, May 2008
- Mid-Atlantic Emmy nomination for "The Once and Future Newark", August 2007
- Arthur and Patricia Ryan Award with Mary Sue Sweeney Price, Women's Board, New Jersey Performing Arts Center, 2006
- Seventy-Fifth Anniversary Alumni Award, University of Bridgeport, 2003
- Medal of Saint Benedict's, Saint Benedict's Preparatory School, Newark, New Jersey, 2000
- Distinguished Alumni Award, University of Bridgeport, 1999
- Paul Robeson History Award, Paul Robeson Cultural Center, Rutgers University, 1999
- The Alice Paul Humanitarian Award, State of New Jersey, 1997
- Richard J. Hughes Award, New Jersey Historical Commission, 1996
- Warren I. Susman Award for Excellence in Teaching, Rutgers University, 1991
- President's Award for Outstanding Service to Black Historical Scholarship in the State of New Jersey, Glassboro State College, February, 1991
- NIA Award for Distinguished Leadership in Education, New Jersey Association of Black Educators, 1987
- Arts Leadership Award, New School for the Arts, Montclair NJ, 1985
- Outstanding Achievement and Service to the Black Community, Association of Black Law Students, Rutgers
- Human Rights Award, New Jersey Education Association, 1981
- Fellow, New Jersey Historical Society, 1981
- Outstanding Teacher of the Year, Rutgers University, Newark College of Arts and Sciences, 1977–78
- Teacher of the Year, Essex County College, 1969

== Publications and books ==
Price was the foremost authority on the black New Jersey past by virtue of his Freedom Not Far Distant: A Documentary History of Afro-Americans in New Jersey (1980), Many Voices, Many Opportunities: Cultural Pluralism and American Arts Policy (1994) and numerous other scholarly works.

These include:

- Spencer Crew, Lonnie Bunch, Clement Alexander Price, editors. Slave Culture: A Documentary Collection of the Slave Narratives from the Federal Writer's Project, 1936–1938 (Greenwood Press, 2014).
- "The Path to Big Mama's House: Historic Preservation, Memory, and African-American History (National Trust for Historic Preservation, 2014).
- "When Historic Sites Reveal the New American Past: Reflections on History, Memory and the Unknown" (Preservation Leadership Forum Blog, 2014)
- "Commemorating a New American History and Culture", in Jia Leilei, Editor-in-Chief, A Binational Conversation on Bridging Cultures, The Context: Place, People, History, The Third China-U.S. Cultural Forum Collection of the Theses (Beijing: Culture and Art Publishing House, 2013).
- "On the Road to Freedom: A Sesquicentennial Observance of the Great Emancipation", in The Positive Community (Montclair, NJ, Winter 2013).
- "History and Memory: Why it Matters That We Remember", Epilogue in Jessica I. Elfenbein, Thomas L. Hollowak, and Elizabeth M. Nix, eds. Baltimore '68: Riots and Rebirth in an American City (Temple University Press, Philadelphia, 2011).
- "Break Every Yoke, Let the Oppressed Go Free! African Americans and the Civil War", in The Positive Community (Montclair, NJ, February 2011).
- "The Foundations of Contemporary African American Life and History", in Mixing Metaphors: The Aesthetic, the Social and the Political in African American Art, Works from the Bank of America Collection, Howard University Gallery of Art Brochure, 2010.
- "Foreword", in Nelson Johnson, The Northside: African Americans and the Creation of Atlantic City (Medford, NJ: Plexus Publishing, 2010).
- "Perspectives: Is the Past Still Prologue?", Integral: The Journal of Fund for An Open Society, Spring 2009.
- "The NAACP and the Black Church: A Centennial Acknowledgement", The Positive Community, June 2009.
- "Public Spaces: Where People Meet and Talk", The New Rwanda; Prosperity and the Public Good, Scranton: University of Scranton, 2009.
- "Ben Jones's Modernist Palette", Deliverance: The Art of Ben Jones, 1970–2008, Jersey City, New Jersey: The Jersey City Museum, 2009.
- "New Jersey and the Near Collapse of Civic Culture: Reflections on the Summer of 1967", The Hall Institute of Public Policy, NJ, July, 2007.
- "Newark Remembers the Summer of 1967, So Should We All", The Positive Community, July/August 2007.
- "Contested Memories", The New Jersey Jewish News, July 2007.
- "A Modern Man: Paul Robeson in American Civilization", in The Criterion Collection of Films featuring Paul Robeson, New York: The Criterion Collection, 2007.
- "On Anchoring A Generation of Scholars: P. Sterling Stuckey and the Nationalist Persuasion in African American History", Journal of African American History, 2007.
- Foreword, Angelique Lampros, Remembering Newark's Greeks: An American Odyssey (Virginia Beach, VA: Donning Co. Publishers, 2006.
- "Historicizing Katrina", in David Dante Troutt, ed., After the Storm: Black Intellectuals Explore the Meaning of Hurricane Katrina (New York: The New Press, 2006).
- "We Are All Colored Now: The Anticipated Future of New Jersey's Cultural Landscape", Jersey City Museum Virtual Catalogue, Spring 2005.
- "The Crisis and New Jersey", in "State Budgets and the Crisis of Historical Infrastructure: A Forum", Perspectives: Newsmagazine of the American Historical Association, Vol. 42, May 2004, pp. 31–32.
- "Race, Blackness, and Modernism During the Harlem Renaissance", Foreword, Aberjhani and Sandra L. West, eds, Encyclopedia of the Harlem Renaissance (New York: Facts on File, 2003).
- "Home and Hearth: The Black Town and Settlement Movement in Southern New Jersey", in
- Wendel White, Small Towns, Black Lives: African American Communities in Southern New Jersey (Oceanville, New Jersey: The Noyes Museum, 2003), pp, 168–175.
- "Newark Confronts Its Past…And Chooses Its Future", in Sondra Myers, ed., The Democracy Reader (New York:
- International Debate Education Association, 2002), pp. 82–84.
- "An Academic Life in the Public Sphere", The Chronicle of Higher Education: Career Network 8 April 2002 (online edition) http://chronicle.com/job/2002/04/200204081c.htm.
- "Introduction and Column Interpretations", The Civil Rights Garden (Atlantic City, NJ: CRDA, 2001).
- "Mel Edwards' Way", Melvin Edwards: The Prints of a Sculptor (Jersey City, NJ: Jersey City Museum, 2000), pp. 5–7.
- New School University, "Are We Ready for A Cabinet-Level Position for Culture", The Vera List Center for Arts and Politics, 1999.
- "Heritage and Scholarship", Rutgers Focus, A Newspaper for University Faculty and Staff, April 3, 1998, pp. 4–5.
- "The Public Sphere in an Age of Contested Conflict", New Jersey Center for Law-Related Education Network News (Spring 1997), 4–5.
- "Composing the Community: Blacks Making and Teaching Music in Southern New Jersey", introduction in Henrietta Fuller Robinson and Carolyn Cordelia Williams, Dedicated to Music, The Legacy of African American Church Musicians and Music Teachers in Southern New Jersey, 1915–1990 (Cherry Hill, NJ: Africana Homestead Legacy Publishers, 1997).
- "Along the New Jersey Divide: How Policy and Prejudice Splinter Us", New Jersey Reporter, 26 (November/December 1996) 23–25.
- "The Civility of William M. Ashby", in William M. Ashby, Tales Without Hate, revised ed. (Newark, NJ: Newark Preservation and Landmarks Committee, 1996).
- "A Consideration of New Jersey Afro-American Scholarship", The Journal of the Rutgers University Libraries, LVI (1994), 1–3.
- "Black Soldiers in two World Wars: 'Men of Bronze' (1980) and 'Liberators' (1992)", Historical Journal of Film, Radio and Television, XIV (1994), 467–74; republished in John W. Chambers II and David Culbert, eds., World War II, Film, and History, Oxford University Press, 1996.
- Many Voices, Many Opportunities: Cultural Pluralism and American Arts Policy (New York: American Council for the Arts, 1994).
- "The Parlous State of New Jersey History", New Jersey Historical Commission Newsletter, 24 (June–July, 1994), 1–2.
- "Diversity on Common Ground: The Troubled Quest for Order by American Museums", Connecticut Humanities (Spring, 1994), 4.
- "Newark and the Rhetoric of Optimism", in Gary Jardim, ed., Blue Newark Culture (Orange, NJ, 1993).
- "Turning Memory Into History: The Past as Viewed by Blacks in Morristown, New Jersey", foreword in Cheryl C. Turkington, Setting Up Our Own City, The Black Community in Morristown, An Oral History (Morristown: Joint Free Library of Morristown and Morris Township, 1993).
- "Documenting Slavery's End in Monmouth County, New Jersey", introduction to The Manumission Book of Monmouth County, New Jersey, 1791–1844 (Red Bank, NJ: Monmouth County Office of the County Clerk, 1992).
- "Been So Long: A Critique of the Process that Shaped 'From Victory to Freedom, Afro-American Life in the Fifties,'" in Kenneth L. Ames, Barbara Franco and L. Thomas Frye, eds., Ideas and Images: Developing Interpretative History Exhibits (Nashville: American Association of State and Local History, 1992).
- "James A. Brown, Fellow Traveler", in The Power Within: An Exhibition of Recent Works by artist James Andrew Brown (Newark, NJ: Rutgers, The State University of New Jersey, 1991).
- "Folk Life, City Life and Blacks in the Bottle", in Crisis of the Minority Male, Report of the Proceedings of a 1989 Conference (Newark, NJ: The University of Medicine and Dentistry of New Jersey, 1990).
- "The Afro-American Experience in New Jersey: Themes and Pedagogy", The Docket, the Journal of the New Jersey Council for Social Studies (Spring 1990).
- "In Search of a People's Spirit: The Harmon Foundation and American Interest in Afro-American Artists", in Gary A. Reynolds and Beryl J. Wright, eds, Against the Odds: African-American Artists and the Harmon Foundation (Newark, NJ: The Newark Museum, 1989).
- "Two Lives: Searching for a Balance in Our Essential Duality", Vantage Point, The Magazine of the American Council for the Arts (July–August 1988).
- "We Knew Our Place, We Knew Our Way: Lessons from the Black Past of Southern New Jersey", Seventh Annual Report of the New Jersey Public Policy Research Institute, Blacks in New Jersey, 1986 Report, A Review of Blacks in South Jersey (Newark, NJ: New Jersey Public Policy Research Institute, 1986).
- "The Cause in Which We Are Mutually Engaged: Quakers and the Dawn of Black Freedom in New Jersey", in M. M. Pernot, ed., After Freedom (Burlington, NJ: Burlington County Historical Society, 1987).
- "Cultural Pluralism: An Historical Perspective", The Afro-American Artist in the Age of Cultural Pluralism (Montclair, NJ: Montclair Art Museum, 1987).
- "The Strange Career of Race Relations in New Jersey History", The Black Experience in Southern New Jersey (Camden, NJ: Camden County Historical Society, 1985).
- "Manumission of Slaves, Burlington County, New Jersey 1776–1783", in Freedom Papers, 1776–1783 (Burlington, NJ: Burlington County Historical Society, 1984).
- "Black Historical Scholarship and the Black Historian: A New Jersey Conference in Observance of Black History Month" (co-authored with Giles R. Wright), Negro History Bulletin, 36 (Spring 1983), 38–40.
- "The Struggle to Desegregate Newark: Black Middle-Class Militancy in New Jersey, 1932–1947, New Jersey History, XCIX (Fall-Winter 1981), 215–26 (published 1983).
- "Morgan Foster Larson", in Paul A. Stellhorn and Michael J. Birkner, eds, The Governors of New Jersey 1664–1974 (Trenton: New Jersey Historical Commission, 1982).
- "Talking History: The New Jersey Black Oral History Workshop", in History News (February, 1982).
- "William M. Ashby: Renaissance Man", in William M. Ashby, Tales Without Hate (Newark, NJ: Newark Preservation and Landmarks Committee, 1980).
- Freedom Not Far Distant: A Documentary History of Afro-Americans in New Jersey (Newark, NJ: New Jersey Historical Society, 1980).
- "New Jersey Afro-Americans: From Colonial Times to the Present" (co-authored with Lee Hagen, Larry Green and Leonard Harris), in Barbara Cunningham, ed., The New Jersey Ethnic Experience (Union City, NJ: Wise & Co., 1977).
- "The Beleaguered City as Promised Land: Blacks in Newark, NJ, 1917–1947", in William C. Wright, ed., Urban New Jersey Since 1870 (Trenton: New Jersey Historical Commission, 1976); republished in Maxine N. Lurie, ed., A New Jersey Anthology (Newark: New Jersey Historical Society, 1994).
- "Walking the Tightrope of Black Leadership", The Trenton Times, February 25, 1996.
- "The Birth and Evolution of the Cool", The Trenton Times, August 13, 1995.
- Ernest S. Lyght, "Path of Freedom: the Black Presence in New Jersey's Burlington County, 1659–1900"; and Lenora W. McKay, "The Blacks of Monmouth County"; New Jersey Historical Commission Newsletter, June 1979.
- Dorothy Butler Gilliam, "Paul Robeson: All American", New Jersey Historical Commission Newsletter, September 1981.
- Stanley B. Winters, comp. and ed., "From Riot to Recovery: Newark After Ten Years", New Jersey Historical Commission Newsletter, September, 1981.
- Stuart Galishoff, "Newark, the Nation's Unhealthiest City, 1832–1895", in New Jersey Historical Commission Newsletter, October 1988.
- "Negro Baseball as Metaphor, "Pride and Passion: The African American Baseball Experience—An Exhibit, Countee Cullen Branch Library, New York, January 22, 2009.
- "We Who Have Always Been With You: Race, Slavery and Freedom in New Jersey, 1804–1860", 15th Annual New Jersey Council for History Education Annual Conference, Princeton University, December 7, 2007.
- "The Origin of the Modern Civil Rights Movement", Gilder Lehrman Institute of American History, Museum of the City of New York, October 29, 2007.
- "The World of John Rock", 4th Annual John S. Rock Memorial Lecture, Salem County Historical Society, Salem, New Jersey, October 21, 2007.
- "Flawed Freedom: New Jersey and The First Emancipation", 20th Annual Conference, Slavery and Abolition in New Jersey, New Jersey Historical Commission, Trenton War Memorial, November 20, 2004.
- "On Anchoring a Generation of Scholars: P. Sterling Stuckey and the Nationalist Persuasion in African American History", Africans, Culture, and Intellectuals: P. Sterling Stuckey and the Folk, University of California at Riverside, Riverside, California, Saturday, May 22, 2004.
- "Post World War II Newark: Tales of Decline and Conflict", Walsh Library Gallery, Seton Hall University, April 19, 2004.
- "State Budgets and the Crisis of Historical Infrastructure in the United States: A Panel Discussion", American Historical Association, Annual Meeting, Washington, D.C., January 10, 2004.
- "Scholarship on the Edge: Practicing and Defending Public Intellectual Work", Imagining America National Conference, University of Illinois, Champaign/Urbana, November 9, 2003.
- "American Studies in the Public Sphere: PhDs Outside the Academy", American Studies Association Annual Meeting, Houston, Texas, November 16, 2002.
- "Rethinking the Urban Experience", Cities and Public Spaces in Comparative Cultural Contexts Seminar, Community College Humanities Association, Library of Congress, June 2–3, 2002.
- "A City of Refinement: Urban Fantasies and Progressivism in Newark", The Legacy of John Cotton Dana Symposium, Dana Library, Rutgers-Newark, May 17, 1999.
- "The Perceived City", Arts Transforming the Urban Environment Conference Plenary Session, Rutgers-Newark, October 9, 1998.
- "History in the Public Square: The Uses of Public Space for Historical Commemoration in New Jersey", Sixth Annual John Henry 'Pop' Lloyd Lecture, Atlantic City, NJ, October 11, 1998.
- "The Twilight of Optimism: Black-Jewish Relations in Newark During the Sixties", Conference on Politics, Law, and the Jewish Community, Jewish Historical Society of MetroWest, Whippany, New Jersey, September 12, 1997.
- "Race and the Teaching of American History", Princeton Summer Institute for Teachers of History, Princeton University, July 14, 1997.
- "Hammering Out A People's Past: The Making of Afro-American History", Bowie State University, Maryland, April 20, 1996.
- "Dedicated to Music: The Legacy of African-American Church Music Teachers in Southern New Jersey, 1915–1995", Annual Meeting of the Association for the Study of Afro-American Life and History, Philadelphia, October 7, 1995.
- "Oral History and the Negro Baseball Leagues", Annual Meeting of the Association for the Study of Afro-American Life and History, Philadelphia, October 6, 1995.
- "Deeds Survive the Doer: Marion Thompson Wright and the Construction of New Jersey Afro-American History", Annual Meeting of the Association for the Study of Afro-American Life and History, Philadelphia, October 5, 1995.
- "Controversial Exhibits: Academic Freedom, Institutional Mission and Community Participation", American Association for State and Local History, Saratoga Springs, New York, September 9, 1995
- "The Role of the Arts and Humanities in Shaping Public Policy", Spoleto Festival USA 1995, Charleston, South Carolina, May 27, 1995.
- "The Underground Railroad in Context: Preserving African-American History on the Urban Landscape", Paterson Museum, May 17, 1995.
- "Black 'Eagles' of World War II", The Rutgers Center for Historical Analysis, New Brunswick, New Jersey, November 7, 1994.
- "Blacks and Jews in the City of Opportunity: Newark, New Jersey, 1900–1967", Jewish Historical Society of MetroWest, Whippany, New Jersey, June 13, 1994.
- "Black Workers at the Twilight of the Civil Rights Movement", New York University, Wagner Labor Archives, May 21, 1994.
- "Race and Perception: Mounting Exhibitions in African American History and Culture", Annual Meeting of the American Association of Museums, Seattle, Washington, April 26, 1994.
- "Paul Robeson, the Scholar", Institute for Arts and Humanities Education, The Newark Museum, April 23, 1994.
- "Teaching New Jersey African American Culture", Conference on New Jersey Studies, Rutgers University, New Brunswick, NJ, March 16, 1994.
- "Diversity on Common Ground: The Troubled Quest for Order by American Museums", Connecticut Humanities Council, Waterbury, Connecticut, November 15, 1993.
- "Black American Soldiers in Two World Wars", The Rutgers Center for Historical Analysis, New Brunswick, NJ, October 22, 1993.
- "Currier & Ives and the Transformation of Modern America's Visual Imagination", Montclair Art Museum, May 16, 1993.
- "Historical Roots of the Relationship: The Early Years of Interaction", Conference on "Demythologizing Blacks and Jews", State University of New York at Stony Brook, April 25, 1993.
- "The Past As Prologue: Modern Afro-American Life in Morris County", Conference Keynote Presentation, "Chanceman's Community: Twentieth-Century Black Morristown", County College of Morris, April 23, 1993.
- "The Historian's View of Genealogy", The Genealogy Club of The New Jersey Historical Society Library and the New Jersey Chapter of The Afro-American Historical and Genealogical Society, Newark, NJ, February 20, 1993.
- "Reinterpreting Museum Collections from the African American Perspective", The Old Barracks Museum, Trenton, NJ, February 6, 1993.
- Commentator, Symposium for "Alone in a Crowd: Prints of the 1930s and 1940s by African American Artists from the Collection of Reba and Dave Williams", The Newark Museum, January 23, 1993.
- "Race, Ethnicity, and Nationalism in American History", Vassar College, November 1, 1993.
- Commentator for the conference panel "Textile Workers and the Culture of the Working Class", William Paterson College, December 5, 1992.
- "Walt Whitman's Vision of America", Symposium on "Walt Whitman's Vision of Democracy, Then and Now", The Somerset County Library, November 15, 1992.
- "Cultural Pluralism: The History and the Debate", Annual Meeting of the American Council for the Arts, Atlanta, GA, September 17, 1992, with responses by Coretta Scott King, Dr. Billy Taylor and President Jimmy Carter.
- "Africa and the African-American Community", The Cultures of Africa Series, Fairleigh Dickinson University, Madison, NJ, April 11, 1992.
- "A Moody Light: Romanticism in American Landscape Painting, 1835–1929", The Montclair Art Museum, February 23, 1992.
- "Afro-Americans and the Quest for Justice in New Jersey", Glassboro State College, Glassboro, NJ, February 25, 1991.
- "West African Cultural Retention in Eighteenth Century New Jersey", Symposium on "Tracing the History and Contributions of African Americans in New Jersey", Fairleigh Dickinson University, Teaneck, NJ, January 16, 1991.
- "Clio's Changing Colors: The Evolution of a New American Historiography", Cooperstown Graduate Association Conference, Winterthur Museum, Princeton, NJ, October 28, 1990.
- "Point to Point: Rural/Urban African American Culture", Symposium on "Home: Contemporary Urban Images by Black Photographers", The Studio Museum in Harlem, New York, NY, October 23, 1990.
- "The Concept of Freedom in Afro-American History", Lecture Series on African and African American Issues, Jersey City State College, Jersey City, NJ, September 27, 1990.
- "The Harmon Foundation and the Making of A Modern Afro-American Ethos", Symposium for "Against the Odds: African American Artists and the Harmon Foundation", The Gibbs Museum of Art, Charleston, SC, June 6, 1990.
- Presentation, "History in the Making of a Multi-Cultural Curriculum", Newark Board of Education Conference on Curriculum Reform, April 12, 1990.
- "Looking Homeward: Afro-American Interest in Africa", Symposium on "Bayard Rustin as Art Collector", Kean College of New Jersey, January 31, 1990.
- Comment, "The Distorted Patterns of Federal Transportation Policy", Annual Meeting of the Organization of American Historians, Washington, DC, March 23, 1990.
- "The Image of African Americans in Modern Museums", Symposium on "The Politics of Portraiture: Icons, Stereotypes and Other Approaches to Multi-Cultural Imaging", National Portrait Gallery, Washington, DC, January 25, 1990.
- "How Oral History Becomes Written History", History and Bibliography Section, New Jersey Library Association, Rutgers University, New Brunswick, NJ, December 1, 1989.
- "Historical Writing and Social Change: Marion Thompson Wright's Influence on Contemporary New Jersey Life", Symposium on "Writing New Jersey Afro-American History from Marion Thompson Wright to the Present", Newark Public Library, February 26, 1989.
- "Folk Culture, City Life and Black Life in the Bottle: Historical Notes on Twentieth-Century Substance Abuse", University of Medicine and Dentistry of New Jersey, December 3, 1989.
- "New Jersey Afro-Americans, Woodrow Wilson and the Limits of Progressivism", Annual Conference, New Jersey Historical Commission, Princeton University, December 3, 1988.
- "Black Migration and the Self-Help Ideology, 1915–1940: Booker T. Washington Moves North", Lecture Series for "Field to Factory", Germantown Historical Society, Philadelphia, PA, October 20, 1988.
- "From African to Afro-American: Making a Black Society in Early New Jersey History", Symposium on Eighteenth-Century New Jersey Black History, Newark Public Library, February 27, 1988.
- "The Difficult Challenge of Afro-American Freedom: Historical Notes on 1865 and 1980", Port Authority of New York and New Jersey, World Trade Center, February 26, 1987.
- "The New Black History and the Public Muse", Annual Meeting of the Association for the Study of Afro-American Life and History, Durham, NC, November, 1987.
- "The Great Migration Revisited", Annual Black Women's History Conference, Montclair State College, May 17, 1986.
- "Paul Robeson's New Jersey: 1890–1920", Commemorative Program on Paul Robeson, Rutgers University, Newark, NJ, November 19, 1986.
- "Seeking For A City: Suburbanization and Afro-American History", Annual Meeting of the Southern Historical Association, Charlotte, NC, November 15, 1986.
- "The Emerging Scholarship on Afro-American History in New Jersey", Bergen County Historical Society, February 23, 1985.
- "Life and Society Among the Migrants: Newark's Black Population, 1900–1930", Seminar for New Jersey Historians, Princeton University, March 8, 1983.
- Commentator, publication program for Audrey Olsen Faulkner, et al., eds., When I Was Comin' Up: An Oral History of Aged Blacks, Rutgers University, Newark, NJ, December, 1982.
- "The Strange Career of Jim Crow in New Jersey History", Annual Meeting of the Burlington County Historical Society, Burlington, NJ, November, 1982.
- "Of Color, Humanitas and Statehood: The Black Experience in Pennsylvania over Three Centuries, 1681–1981, A Critique of the Exhibition", Annual Meeting of the African-American Museums Association, Atlanta, GA, November, 1981.
- "Co-operative Ventures with Minority Institutions", Annual Conference of the American Association of State and Local History, Williamsburg, VA, September 14, 1981.
- "The Struggle to Desegregate Newark: Black Middle Class Militancy in New Jersey, 1932–1947", Annual Meeting of the Association for the Study of Afro-American Life and History, New Orleans, LA, October 18, 1980.
- "The Reluctant Servants: Social Workers and Newark's Neediest, 1915–1950", Meeting of the Newark Health and Welfare Coordinating Council, Bethany Baptist Church, Newark, NJ, June 22, 1978.
- "The Black Church in New Jersey and the Struggle for Equality", Symposium for the 150th anniversary of the Mt. Zion A.M.E. Church, New Brunswick, NJ, October 12, 1977.
- "A Conversation with Clement Price: Newark's Rebirth", Caucus: New Jersey with Steve Adubato, October 8, 2007.
- "5 Days in July", aired on PBS, Fall, 2007.
- "Revolution '67", on-camera interview, NJN public television, July 2007.
- "A Greener, Greater Newark", on-camera interview, NJN public television, June 2007.
- "Another View", on-camera interview, NJN public television, July 2007.
- "The Once and Future Newark with Clement Alexander Price", Newark: Rutgers University, broadcast on New Jersey Network, November, 2006.
