= Marc James Francis =

British film director, producer (born 1975)

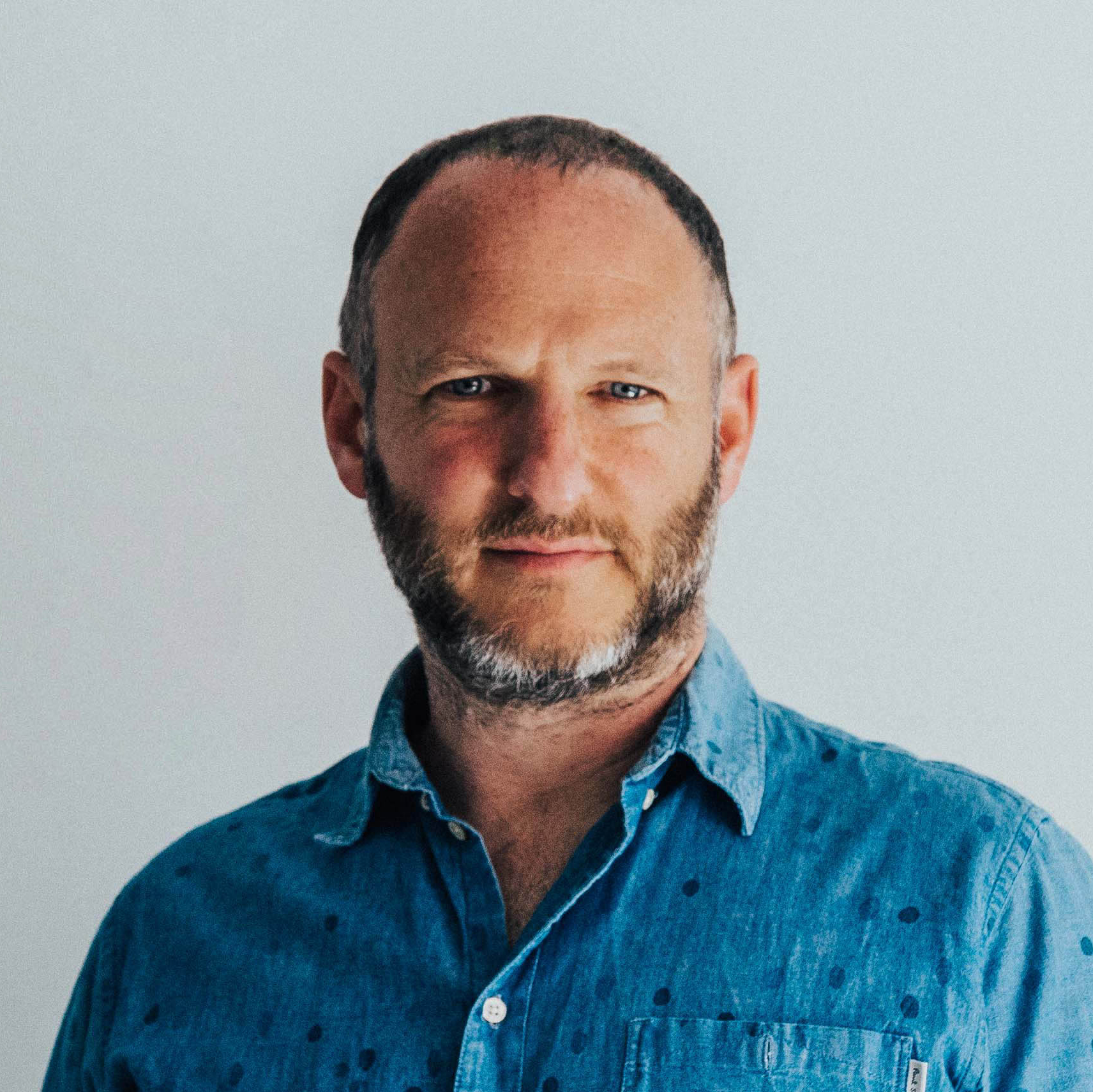
- Francis in 2020
- Born: 4 December 1975 (age 50); UK
- Other names: Marc J. Francis, Marc Francis
- Occupations: Film director, film producer, documentary film cinematographer
- Years active: 2000–present

Marc James Francis (also known as Marc J. Francis and Marc Francis) is a British film director, producer and documentary cinematographer.

In 2007, Marc and his brother Nick Francis were chosen by Harper’s Bazaar magazine as two of their top Forty Under 40; Household Names of the Future. In 2007, The Observer newspaper named the brothers as some of Britain’s Rising Stars. They both were regular contributors to the Observer's sister paper The Guardian between 2006 and 2012, notably in its film blog.

Marc is Co-founder and Creative Director of the production company Speakit, founded in 2004 with his brother Nick Francis.

== Early life ==
Prior to his film career, Marc was an undergraduate at the University of Leeds where he learned Mandarin. He also studied Chinese cinema and lived in China during the economic boom of the mid-1990s.

During that time, together with his brother Nick Francis, he made a documentary about the anti-nuclear weapons protest movement and their attempts to shut down Britain’s Trident submarine base in Scotland in 2002.

== Career ==
In 2004, Francis and his brother founded British production company Speakit Films. Their first Speakit film was Black Gold which launched at the Sundance film festival in 2006 to critical acclaim. His work has been supported by The Sundance Institute, The BRITDOC Foundation, the BFI, Bertha Foundation CNC and EU MEDIA Programme Fund.

== Feature films ==
Black Gold (2006)

Directed and produced with his brother Nick Francis, Black Gold was the first film to receive funding from BritDoc. The film follows the efforts of an Ethiopian Coffee Union manager as he travels the world to obtain a better price for his workers' coffee beans. The film premiered at the 2006 Sundance Film Festival. It was nominated to and won several awards, amongst which Best Achievement in Production - British Independent Film Awards 2007 and Contemporary Issues - San Francisco Black Film Festival (2006).

Black Gold went on to be seen in over 60 international film festivals including London, Rome, Berlin, Melbourne, Hong Kong, and Rio de Janeiro and has secured major broadcast deals around the world including Channel 4 (UK), PBS/Independent Lens (US), Documentary Channel (Canada), NHK (Japan), and Al-jazeera (Middle East).

The film has attracted wide coverage in the media including features on CNN, The Guardian, BBC World, BBC News 24, Sky News, Bloomberg, The Observer, The Times, The Daily Telegraph, New York Times, LA Times, The Washington Post and The Sunday Times.

Since the first showing of Black Gold during Sundance, Starbucks sent people to screenings of the film in what has been called by one journalist "going on a charm offensive". As the film became more and more popular, Starbucks flew Tadesse and four other African coffee producers to their Seattle headquarters for a weekend conference, which was seen by many as a PR stunt. Further, just before the film premiered at the London Film Festival in October 2006, a memo received by Starbucks staff from the headquarters leaked to the Black Gold forum. The internal memo was sent out to inform all Starbucks employees that Black Gold was "incomplete and inaccurate".

When China Met Africa (2010)

Directed and produced with his brother Nick Francis. Set on the front line of Chinaʼs foray into Africa, the film follows the lives of a Chinese farmer, a road builder, and the Zambian trade minister.

Walk with Me (2017)

In 2011, Marc was invited by filmmaker and friend Max Pugh to help him make a film about Zen Master Thich Nhat Hanh. He spent several months over 5 years living in Plum Village - Thich Nhat Hanh’s monastery in France, where he learned the art of meditation and mindfulness. This experience changed his life and by 2017, they had completed their film Walk with Me and it was released worldwide.

Directed and produced with Max Pugh, the Benedict Cumberbatch narrated film premiered in 2017 and screened at international film festivals like SXSW, BFI London Film Festival 2017, Illuminate Film Festival and Foyle Film Festival.

== Short films ==
A Letter from Calais (2016)

Directed by Marc and Nick Francis and produced by Marc and Nick Francis and Max Pugh released in October 2016 for Benedict Cumberbatch's company, Sunny March. Featuring Jude Law, the film aims to draw attention to the hundreds of unaccompanied children living in the Calais refugee camp.

Madam President (2012)

Directed and produced by Marc and Nick Francis released on The Guardian website in December 2012 and supported by The Guardian and the Worldview Broadcast Media Scheme. The film is an exclusive portrait of Malawi’s first female President Joyce Banda, as she tries to steer her country out of an economic crisis.

== TV Documentaries ==
Nuke UK (2001)

Channel 4 / Ideal World Productions TV documentary directed by Marc and Nick Francis.

St Dunstans (2003)

TV documentary of 6 x 30 minutes episodes directed by Marc J. Francis and released on ITV.
