= Matthew Algie =

Independent coffee roaster business

- Founded: 1864
- Founder: Matthew Algie
- Headquarters: 16 Lawmoor Road, Glasgow, Scotland
- Products: Coffee supply, Coffee & hot beverage machine rental, SCA accredited training campuses, tea and barista equipment
- Website: http://www.matthewalgie.com/

Matthew Algie is a coffee roaster, owned by Tchibo Coffee, with registered offices at 16 Lawmoor Road, Glasgow, United Kingdom. The company sells its coffee to coffee shops, bars, restaurants, hotels and businesses across the UK & Ireland and also offers coffee machines for hire - supported by a network of field engineers as well as a range of coffee-related equipment and complementary products through its brand Espresso Warehouse. Additionally, Matthew Algie also provide SCA accredited barista training courses, taught via their training campuses based in London, Glasgow & Dublin.

== Coffee ==
Around 90% of Matthew Algie green coffee comes from certified sources. The company has contributed over $3million (US) to community and farm projects through Fairtrade levies to date. The remainder of its green coffee comes from independent coffee farmers, with whom the company has direct trading relationships. Matthew Algie uses traditional Probat drum roasting and is thought to be one of the few coffee roasters to use cryogenics to produce its ground coffee. Matthew Algie sells both filter and espresso coffees, including a triple certified espresso coffee (Fairtrade, Rainforest Alliance and Organic).

== Everything but the Coffee ==
In 1997 Matthew Algie launched Espresso Warehouse (with the strapline ‘Everything but the Coffee’) to support the growing wave of independent coffee bars. Espresso Warehouse products are sold to coffee retailers in the UK and Ireland as well as through distributors in Europe. Products are now largely third party brands and include tea (Suki tea and Sir Henry brand), hot chocolate (Chocolate Abyss), syrups (Da Vinci), biscuits and cookies (including The Fine Cookie Co) alongside a wide range of barista equipment and coffee bar hardware.

== History ==
Matthew Algie (born 1814 in Greenock, Scotland, died 1906) was a grocer who sold tea that had been imported to Scotland on the Clyde Clippers. He established Matthew Algie the tea blending and wholesaling business in 1864. For around 80 years, and through two World Wars, the business sold tea and spices to retailers in the Glasgow area. In 1950 the company, then known as Algie’s, started selling coffee to post-war Glasgow, along with vending services under the management of Grace Williamson, at the time the only female tea buyer in Scotland. As the business grew, in 1964 the company moved from Cadogan Street south of the River Clyde to the current site in the Dixon Blazes Industrial Estate in The Gorbals area of Glasgow.

Following a trade market visit to Vancouver in the late 1970s, by Charles 'Charlie' Williamson, (a descendent of Matthew Algie), focus gradually shifted instead to selling coffee and coffee machines for offices, restaurants and hotels, replacing instant coffee with roast and ground coffee.

In the 1980s the business went through a period of rapid expansion outside of Scotland, opening an office and showroom in London while adding bulk-brew and fully automatic and traditional espresso machines to the portfolio. While growth was largely driven by coffee in the hospitality sector, in the early '90s the business made a foray into retail tea launching the Scottish Choice brand with major retailers, supported by TV advertising.

Much like his father’s visit to Canada in the 1970s, in 1995, David Williamson, 6^{th} generation descendant of Matthew Algie, visited Seattle and Portland in the US Pacific Northwest, returning to refocus the company on espresso and emerging US influenced coffee shop culture.

A collaboration with Butler’s Wharf Chef School launched the UK’s first ‘Coffee School’ in London, aimed at hospitality professionals interested in bringing emergent US coffee culture to their operations. The original syllabus covered marketing, coffee and espresso science and barista skills. Course venues expanded to Scotland and Ireland, the latter a new market for the business as it opened an office in Dublin in 1996.

At a time when UK espresso largely followed traditional Italian norms, research projects with the University of Strathclyde combined traditional cupping expertise with consumer and expert sensory modelling to build an understanding of emerging trends in espresso blending and roasting. The company made a significant investment in its roasting capabilities in the late 90's, focusing roastery design on freshness with coffee packed almost immediately after roasting.

Sourcing moved towards a more direct and sustainable approach, with Matthew Algie launching what was likely the UK’s first Fairtrade espresso in 1997, followed by potentially the World’s first triple-certified espresso in 2004 under its Tiki brand (Fairtrade, Rainforest Alliance and Organic). The first triple-cert coffee was produced with financial support from the business with the now defunct La Central co-operative before sources were expanded in Peru, Ethiopia and Indonesia, again underpinned with financial investment from the business.

The company launched Scotland’s first espresso cart in Glasgow’s St Enoch Centre in 1996 and the first of several Tinderbox locations in Glasgow’s Byres Road in 1998, partnering on both projects with Matthew Algie customer Carlo Ventisei. Tinderbox was the first of several projects with leading Glasgow based design agency Graven Images who also worked on the Matthew Algie brand identity and roastery interior during this period.

With the early 2000s coffee crisis impacting producers globally, the business continued to focus on growing Fairtrade sourcing and sales. Working with Oxfam, La Central in Honduras, PPKGO in Indonesia and the Oromia Coffee Farmers Cooperative Union in Ethiopia the business developed and supported Progreso, a producer owned retail café operation, championed by English actor, producer and trade justice campaigner Colin Firth.

As the business moved through the 2000s it grew market position with in-store café partnerships with Marks and Spencer (for whom the business first roasted in 1994), along with Sainsbury’s while on the high-street with Pret A Manger. The establishment of the Coffee Police, a guerrilla marketing campaign complete with a fleet of fully branded “Coffee Police” cars, was a further collaboration with Graven Images. Consumers could report crimes against coffee. Elsewhere, the Espresso Warehouse brand was developed to sell products from the wider cafe category beyond coffee.

In 2008, David Williamson died unexpectedly at the age of 42. The David Williamson Rwanda Foundation was set up in his memory.

The company remained in family trust ownership. During this time the business embarked on sourcing and development projects linked directly to client brands including Marks and Spencer and Sainsbury's, the latter in partnership with Comic Relief. These multi-year programmes were underpinned by pillars in respect of climate change adaptation, gender equality and youth engagement. At the roastery the business installed its first solar generation capacity in 2012 part of a wider adoption of carbon reduction programme started in the 2000s. The business began reporting on social, economic impacts alongside carbon reduction in 2014/2015.

In 2016 Matthew Algie was sold to Tchibo with the intention to retain the brand and possibly expand into existing Tchibo markets in central Europe. In 2024 Tchibo UK and Irish group companies merged under Matthew Algie, seen by some as an endorsement of the strength of the brand. Shortly thereafter, in 2025 the brand repositioned with a new website as a 'commercial' roaster with a wider focus including segments such as the convenience sector in petrol stations, workplaces and hospitals.
