= When China Met Africa =

- Directed by: Marc Francis, Nick Francis
- Written by: Marc Francis and Nick Francis
- Produced by: Marc Francis, Nick Francis and Miriana Bojic Walter
- Edited by: Hugh Williams
- Music by: Florencia Di Concilio
- Production company: Speakit Films
- Release date: 2010
- Running time: 75 minutes

When China Met Africa is a 2010 documentary film by Nick Francis and Marc James Francis. Set on the front line of Chinaʼs foray into Africa, it follows the lives of a Chinese farmer, a road builder, and the Zambian trade minister.

When China Met Africa was an international co-production involving BBC Storyville, Arte France, VPRO, the Sundance Institute, CNC and the Media Fund, and produced by Speakit Films and Zeta Productions. The film played at international film festivals including Rotterdam Film Festival, Munich, Goteburg and at the Margaret Mead Film Festival in New York, where it won best film. It was released in cinemas in the UK in 2011 and was seen on television around the world.

When China Met Africa was characterised by The Guardian as 'An eye-opening documentary that puts into concrete images that truism of the geo-political commentariat: that China is a new economic superpower' and The Times summarised it as 'A rare, grass-roots view into one of the most important economic developments of the age'. The film was also covered by media outlets including CNN, The Economist and The Atlantic.

== Storyline ==
A historic gathering of over 50 African heads of state in Beijing reverberates in Zambia where the lives of three characters unfold. Mr. Liu is one of thousands of Chinese entrepreneurs who have settled across the continent in search of new opportunities. He has just bought his fourth farm and business is booming.

In northern Zambia, Mr. Li, a project manager for a multinational Chinese company is upgrading Zambia's longest road. Pressure to complete the road on time intensifies when funds from the Zambian government start running out.

Meanwhile, Zambia's Trade Minister is en-route to China to secure millions of dollars of investment. The film uses the portrayal of these characters and the expanding footprint of a rising global power to highlight the uncertainty the future holds for not only Africa but the world.

== Production ==
During the production of Black Gold, Marc Francis and Nick Francis encountered a group of Chinese workers building a road in southern Ethiopia. This meeting sparked questions about China's role as a growing rising superpower.

A few years later, the crew arrived in Zambia in the midst of Presidential elections, where the Zambian opposition leader was campaigning on an anti-Chinese platform. Filming became increasingly difficult during this time, but over the next few months, the film crew had extensive meetings with more than a hundred Chinese people living and working in Zambia including construction managers, restaurant owners, farmers, travel agents, labourers, CEO's and government officials. From these interviews three main characters were chosen to be in the film.

One of the main difficulties that was raised during the production was the multitude of dialects spoken by people appearing in the film, which made understanding problematic. The crew often did not know what their characters were saying until reading the transcripts upon their return to the UK.

It was pitched at Sheffield Doc/Fest's 2007 MeetMarket.

== Awards and official selections ==
- WINNER: Best Filmmaker Award - Margaret Mead Film Festival (2010)
- WINNER: Observer Ethical Award for Arts and Culture (2012)
- Official Selection: Sheffield Doc/Fest (2011)
- Official Selection: Rotterdam International Film Festival (2011)
- Official Selection: Munich International Film Festival
- Official Selection: IDFA (2010)
- Official Selection: Full Frame Documentary Film Festival
- Official Selection: Goteborg International Film Festival
- Official Selection: FESPACO Pan-African Film Festival
- Official Selection: Rome Independent Film Festival (RIFF)
- Official Selection: Planete Doc Poland
- Official Selection: Washington Environmental Film Festival
- Official Selection: CPH Dox - Copenhagen International Documentary Film Festival

== Distribution and reception ==
When China Met Africa was theatrically released in the UK in October 2011 after being screened at multiple international festivals. The premiere took place at the Prince Charles Cinema in Leicester Square and was followed by a Q&A with the film's directors hosted by Channel 4's Jon Snow.

It was broadcast on television channels around the world from June 2010, at BBC, VPRO YLE TV1, TSR, ARTE, SVT, NRK and Al Jazeera.

When China Met Africa was released on DVD internationally in October 2011

The film continues to be screened around the world and has played at major institutions as part of events dealing with Sino-African relations, including Columbia University, London School of Economics, The Smithsonian Institution and The Foreign Policy Association.
