= Max Pugh =

British filmmaker

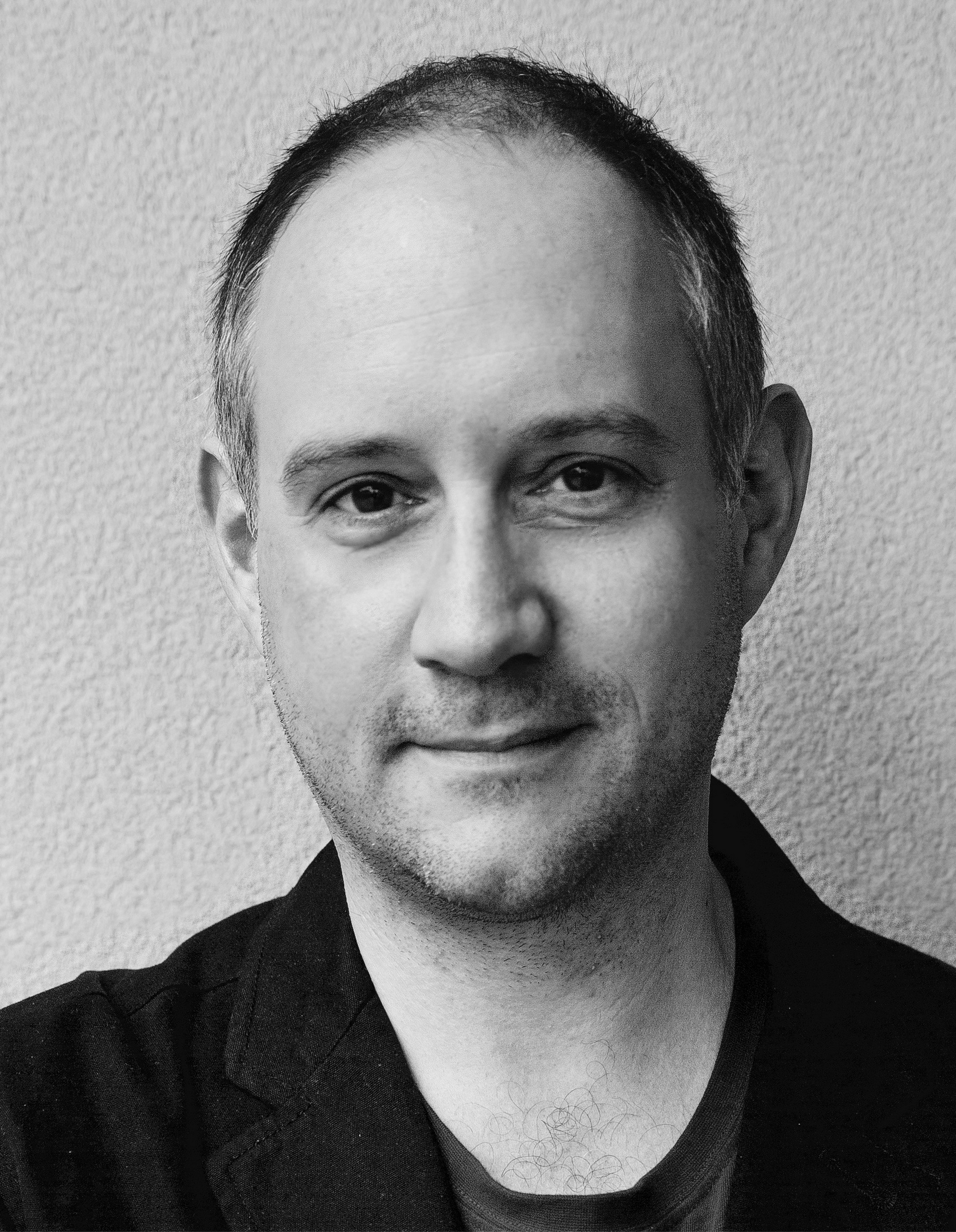
- Pugh in 2018
- Born: Durham, England
- Occupations: Film and television director; screenwriter
- Years active: 1999–present

Max Pugh is a British filmmaker who also has French nationality. Since completing a BBC production traineeship in 2000 during which he worked on Paul Robeson: Speak of Me as I Am, he has directed documentaries on a number of subjects, from arts and music to geopolitical issues for the BBC and Channel Four. For several years he was associated with Yeastculture, a group of filmmakers and video artists that made music videos for live stage shows and for art installations as well as TV documentaries.

In 2003, his first feature documentary The Leech and the Earthworm co-directed with Marc Silver screened at international film festivals. That same year, The End of the Line, his fictional short (made with the help of the UK Film Council New Cinema Fund, Screen East and Tilt Films) which starred Miriam Margolyes and David Oyelowo was nominated for best short at the Rushes Soho Shorts Festival and selected for several other international festivals. In 2005, he directed the short psychological drama Blackout, as well as a series of other documentary films about the rise to power of the left-wing in Venezuela, Bolivia and Ecuador.

Pugh's feature collaboration as film editor with Michael Nyman, NYman with a Movie Camera, premiered at the Toronto Film Festival and Barbican Hall in London in 2010 before being moving to the Berlin Film Festival, Turin, Sydney, Morelia and MOMA New York in 2011. The film has been screened around the world in 2012 in a new version. In August 2013 the film opened as an 11-screen video installation at Summerhall during the Edinburgh Festival. The installation then travelled to Art Basel in Miami, and Zona Maco in Mexico City. In 2015 Michael Nyman and Pugh have screened their new film War Work to critical acclaim in Paris, Budapest, Cologne and London (December 2015) with a theatrical release planned for 2017.

In 2013 Pugh completed The Road to Freedom Peak, a feature documentary about Jonathan Okwir, a former child soldier in Uganda with the Australian journalist and producer Corrin Varady and the actor Djimon Hounsou for Foxtel, Screen Australia and Netflix. In 2016 he finished work on Walk with Me, a documentary about the Buddhist teacher Thich Nhat Hanh with the filmmaker Marc James Francis (Black Gold). Walk with Me is narrated by Benedict Cumberbatch and was released in 2017.

In 2019 Pugh worked on Nyman's Earthquakes with Michael Nyman an experimental feature documentary which premiered at the Milan Film Festival.

In 2022 Pugh worked with Marc James Francis on a biographical documentary about Thich Nhat Hanh entitled ‘A Cloud Never Dies’. Pugh also released a three-screen art installation ‘Nothing Will Ever Stop the Music’ at the MADD Museum in Bordeaux, France.

== Works ==
=== Filmography ===
- The Wrap in Cannes (1998)
- Ashes to Enlightenment (1999)
- My Brecon (2000)
- Tracey Moffat (2000)
- Boris Michailov (2001)
- Roger Ballen (2001)
- Posh Plots (2002)
- The Leech and the Earthworm (2002)
- The End of The Line (2003)
- Spiralling (2006)
- "The Road to Freedom Peak". smh.com.au. February 26, 2014.
- Walk With Me (2017)
- Nothing Will Ever Stop the Music (2022)
- A Cloud Never Dies(2022)

=== Film collaborations ===
- Global Protest (2000)
- Otro modo es posible… en Venezuela with Edizioni Gattacicova (2002)
- Como Bush ganò las elecciones (en Ecuador) with Edizioni Gattacicova (2003)
- Bolivia no se vende with Edizioni Gattacicova (2004)
- Nuestro petroleo y otros cuentos with Edizioni Gattacicova (2005)
- NYman With a Movie Camera with Michael Nyman (2010)
- War Work with Michael Nyman (2014)
- Nyman's Earthquakes with Michael Nyman (2019)

=== Video Installations ===
- Calling London (2001) The Architecture Foundation / Artsworld
- Aztecs in Liverpool (2014) with Michael Nyman
- Images were introduced (2016) with Michael Nyman
- The Twelve-Walled Room (2017) with Michael Nyman
- Nothing Will Ever Stop the Music (2021)

== Books ==
- https://catalogue.nla.gov.au/Record/6188779 Biomapping Indigenous peoples : towards an understanding of the issues / edited by Susanne Berthier-Foglar, Sheila Collingwood-Whittick and Sandrine Tolazzi The Leech and the Earthworm Pg. 61
- https://mitpress.mit.edu/books/environmental-justice-and-environmentalism Environmental Justice and Environmentalism edited by Ronald Sandler, Phaedra C. Pezzullo MIT Press The Leech and the Earthworm Pg. 270-276
- https://catalat.org/book/state-and-democracy-under-hugo-chavez-1998-2013/ STATE AND DEMOCRACY UNDER HUGO CHÁVEZ (1998–2013) By Mariana Bruce, pub. FGV Otro Modo es Posible... en Venezuela Pg. 69 / 270
- http://libcom.org/blog/book-review-venezuela-revolution-spectacle-rafael-uzc%C3%A1tegui-09092011 Venezuela: Revolution as Spectacle by Rafael Uzcategui and Chaz Bufe, Sharp Press (2010) Otro Modo es Posible... en Venezuela
