= Walk with Me (2017 film) =

- Directed by: Marc J. Francis; Max Pugh
- Written by: Marc J. Francis; Max Pugh
- Produced by: Marc J. Francis; Nick Francis; Himesh Kar; William Moore; Max Pugh; Chade-Meng Tan
- Cinematography: Marc J. Francis; Max Pugh
- Edited by: Nicolas Chaudeurge; Marc J. Francis; Alan Mackay; Max Pugh
- Music by: Germaine Franco
- Release date: 2017
- Country: United States
- Language: English

Walk with Me is a 2017 documentary film framed around Zen Buddhist master Thich Nhat Hanh and his Plum Village monastic community. Directed by Marc J Francis and Max Pugh, supported by Oscar-winner Alejandro Gonzalez Inarritu, and filmed over three years, the film focuses on the daily life and rituals of the monastics, accompanied by teachings from Thich Nhat Hanh's early journals narrated in voice over by Benedict Cumberbatch.

The film was released in 2017, premiering at SXSW three years after Thich Nhat Hanh suffered a severe brain haemorrhage in November 2014.

== Synopsis ==
Allowing first time filmed access inside the Plum Village Monastery in France, the film captures the life of the monastic community who have renounced their possessions to practice mindfulness. Captured in vérité style, the film allows viewers to observe rituals and meditations, alongside day-to-day activities of people in the sangha.

The film also follows the monks and nuns embarking on a US speaking tour, where Thich Nhat Hanh is billed alongside famous cultural figures.

== Production ==
Walk With Me was produced by Speakit Films in association with Benedict Cumberbatch's company, SunnyMarch, with WestEnd Films handling international sales.

One third of the film's budget was crowd-funded, and its crew includes sound designer Anna Bertmark, composer Germaine Franco and additional editors Nicholas Chauderge and Alan Mackay.

In interviews, the directors discuss the challenges of establishing the film's approach of making the whole community the main character of the film, in line with Thich Nhat Hanh's wish of not making the film about him. Marc J Francis also explains how capturing the film was heavily shaped by the establishment of trust and openness with the community, and how the narrative was eventually created through the passing of the time.

Passages from the 1960s Fragrant Palm Leaves were selected as accompanying meditations, and narrated by Benedict Cumberbatch.

Benedict Cumberbatch said of the project: 'In my life I’ve been so touched by the teachings of Thich Nhat Hanh. It was a great honor to work on Walk With Me. I have no doubt that audiences across the world will be moved by this beautifully crafted film.'

== Release and reception ==
The film was released in 2017 and screened at international film festivals like SXSW, BFI London Film Festival 2017, Illuminate Film Festival and Foyle Film Festival

Walk With Me was described by The New York Times as 'Cooling to the mind and soothing to the spirit', with The Hollywood Reporter remarking Thich Nhat Hanh's film presence as 'the elusive center ... there's little direct experience of him, but his effect on people filters through the onscreen events'. With an approach summarised by Time Out as 'the exact midway point between a documentary and meditation exercise', specialised reviews remark the film as 'A rare insight into an interesting subject' and 'a relief, and a palate cleanser'.

Walk With Me was supported by Oscar-winning director Alejandro G Innaritu, who stated in an exclusive interview for Variety days after the premiere: '“I loved how [the filmmakers] capture and convey, cinematically, the sometimes inexplicable state of being awakened. It gives a hint of that quiet voice so underrated today and ironically so needed in this time of fear and ignorance.”

== Soundscape ==
In April 2020, Walk With Me released a meditation experience soundscape produced by Marc J Francis and Matt Coldrick, featuring chants of Plum Village monastic choir, alongside recordings of the sounds of nature and mindfulness bells, and Benedict Cumberbatch's elegant readings of Thich Nhat Hanh's journals.
