= Gale (publisher) =

American educational publishing company

- Parent company: Cengage
- Founded: 1954; 72 years ago (as Gale Group)
- Founder: Frederick Gale Ruffner Jr.
- Country of origin: U.S.
- Headquarters location: Farmington Hills, Michigan
- Publication types: Primary sources, databases, e-books, e-learning, Thorndike Large Print
- Official website: www.gale.com

Gale is a global provider of research and digital learning resources. The company is based in Farmington Hills, Michigan, United States, west of Detroit. It has been a division of Cengage since 2007.

The company, formerly known as Gale Research and the Gale Group, is active in research and educational publishing for public, academic, and school libraries, and for businesses. The company is known for its full-text magazine and newspaper databases, Gale OneFile (formerly known as Infotrac), and other online databases subscribed by libraries, as well as multi-volume reference works, especially in the areas of religion, history, and social science.

Founded in Detroit, Michigan, in 1954 by Frederick Gale Ruffner Jr., the company was acquired by the International Thomson Organization (later the Thomson Corporation) in 1985 before its 2007 sale to Cengage.

== History ==
Logo during Thomson Corporation ownership

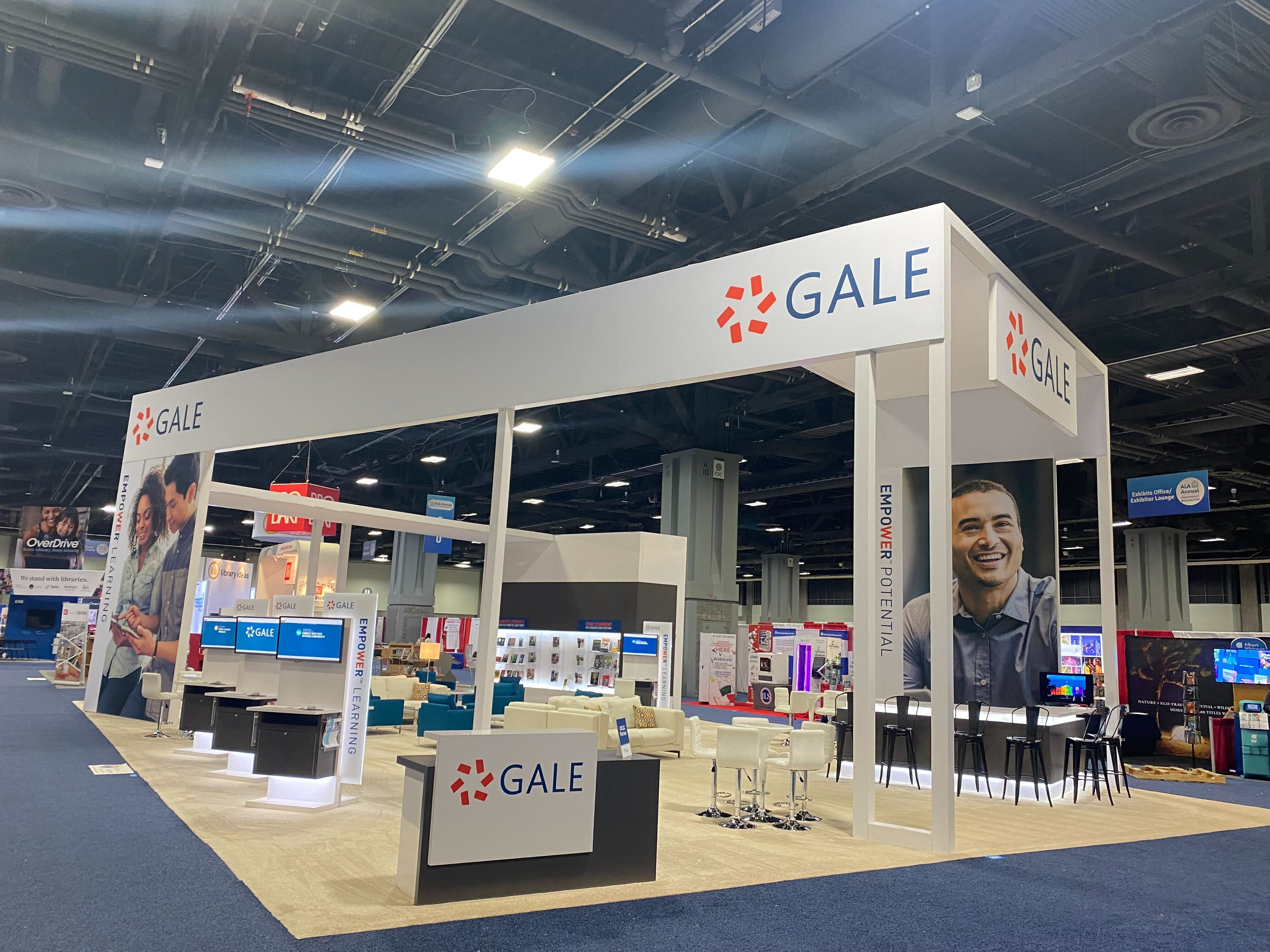
Gale booth at ALA tradeshow

In 1998, Gale Research merged with Information Access Company and Primary Source Media, two companies also owned by Thomson, to form the Gale Group. Thomson has acquired Information Access Company (publisher of InfoTrac) in 1995 and Primary Source Media (formerly named Research Publications) in 1979.

In 1999, Thomson Gale acquired Macmillan Library Reference (including Scribner's Reference, Thorndike Press, Schirmer, Twayne Publishers, and G. K. Hall) from Pearson (which had acquired it from Simon & Schuster in 1998; Macmillan USA was purchased by Simon & Schuster in 1994). In 2000 it acquired the Munich-based K. G. Saur Verlag, but then sold it to Walter de Gruyter in 2006.

On October 25, 2006, Thomson Corporation announced that it intended to wholly divest the Thomson Learning division, because, in the words of Thomson CEO Richard Harrington, "it does not fit with our long-term strategic vision." Thomson has said that it expected this sale to generate approximately $5 billion. Thomson Learning was bought by a private equity consortium consisting of Apax Partners and OMERS Capital Partners for $7.75 billion and the name was changed from Thomson Learning to Cengage Learning on July 24, 2007.

Patrick C. Sommers was president of Gale from October 22, 2007, until he retired in 2010. In 2013, Cengage Learning filed for Chapter 11 bankruptcy protection.

== Products ==
Gale produces hundreds of products, such as Gale Academic OneFile, Biography and Genealogy Master Index, General OneFile, General Reference Center, Sabin Americana (based on Sabin's Bibliotheca Americana), and World History Collection.

Gale print imprints include the reference brands Primary Source Media, Scholarly Resources Inc., Schirmer Reference, St. James Press, The TAFT Group and Twayne Publishers, among others. Five Star Publishing is Gale's fiction imprint, with hundreds of books in print in the Western, Romance, Mystery, and Science Fiction & Fantasy genres. Gale also sells into the K–12 market with several imprints, including U·X·L. Gale also owns large print publishers Christian Large Print and Wheeler Publishing.

== See also ==
- Contemporary Authors—published by Gale
- Dictionary of Literary Biography—published by Gale
- Dictionary of Scientific Biography—published by Scribner's
- Dictionary of the Middle Ages—published by Scribner's
- Encyclopaedia Judaica—published by Gale
- Encyclopedia of Associations—published by Gale
- HighBeam Research—owned by Gale (inactive)
- New Catholic Encyclopedia—published by Gale
- Questia Online Library (now defunct)—owned by Gale
