= Poetry Life and Times =

Poetry Life and Times (ISSN 1752-3265) is a literary magazine based in England that has been engaged in the promotion of poets and poetry since its establishment in 1998. The magazine has featured several poets and their translations from Greek, French, German, Dutch, Italian, and Spanish, as well as English.

== Background ==
The magazine was established by Sara Russell in 1998, in the form of a monthly bulletin of poets' news. Its editorship was transferred in April 2006 to Robin Ouzman Hislop and Amparo Perez Arrospide, who further expanded the magazine to poets whose native language was not English (from Zimbabwe, India, Chile, Spain, and Latvia amongst others). The shift was also marked by a trend towards a more critical and politically minded collective voice. The magazine is being hosted by poet David Michael Jackson.

An early contributor was Richard Vallance, whose Vallance Review series was published in the magazine since 2001. Dedicated to critical reviews on sonneteers, historical and contemporary, as well as on the evolution of the sonnet, this series examines different structures of classical poetry, in both form and idiom. During a transitional period in 2007, PLT teamed up with Creative Thinkers International to maintain its vast archive of photographs online.

== Features ==
Poetry Life and Times was a bimonthly publication, with Featured and Resident poets' chapters or sections. Both allowed authors to publish their own original creations as well as bio and bibliographical information and external links. International poetry communities (such as the Science Fiction Poetry Association) were also promoted, through free announcements of contests and other events. A third section was dedicated to promoting visual arts, including paintings and literary cartoons. In addition, there was a featured interview with a contemporary poet, publisher or editor, or a critical article. Published poetry was not required to strictly adjust to a given pattern and included modernist and post-modernist views and poetic forms ranging from sonnet, sestina and haiku to tanga and experimental free verse. Among many others, published poets included Jim Dunlap, Amir Or, Aberjhani.
