= Tadesse Meskela =

Ethiopian businessman and fair trade advocate

Tadesse Meskela is the General Manager of the Oromia Coffee Farmers Cooperative Union of Ethiopia and was featured in the documentary Black Gold. He is a proponent of fair-trade, and speaks publicly in support of it around the world.

He grew up in the countryside outside Addis Ababa, Bishoftu. Tadesse Meskela studied his way out of poverty and eventually made it to university. By the early 1990s he was working for the state Agricultural Bureau. He attended a two-month co-operative training placement in Japan and was inspired to develop a cooperative union system to help Ethiopian coffee farmers attain a fairer recompense for their produce. The Oromia Coffee Farmers Co-operative Union was established in 1999. In the year 2004, the union has facilitated the constructed of four new schools, seventeen additional classrooms, four health centres, two clean water supply stations, and in terms of dividends, $2 million has been given back to the farmers.
