= Encyclopedia of Associations =

Reference work

- Encyclopedia of Associations 42nd Edition Volume 3
- Author: Frederick Gale Ruffner Jr.
- Genre: Reference
- Published: 1954
- Publisher: Gale
- Publication place: United States

The Encyclopedia of Associations (EA) is a comprehensive directory of more than 20,000 associations, societies, and other non-profit membership organizations in the United States of America.

Originally titled the Encyclopedia of American Associations, EA was created by Frederick Gale Ruffner, Jr. in 1954 while he was working as a market researcher in Detroit, Michigan.

More than 140 scholarly articles have made use of EA.

Past extracts from EA have included "Organized Obsessions" and the "Gale Encyclopedia of Business and Professional Associations".

A detailed history of EA is available in an article in Distinguished Classics of Reference Publishing.

== See also ==
- Gale Research
- Frederick Gale Ruffner, Jr.
