= Corrin Varady =

Australian journalist and entrepreneur

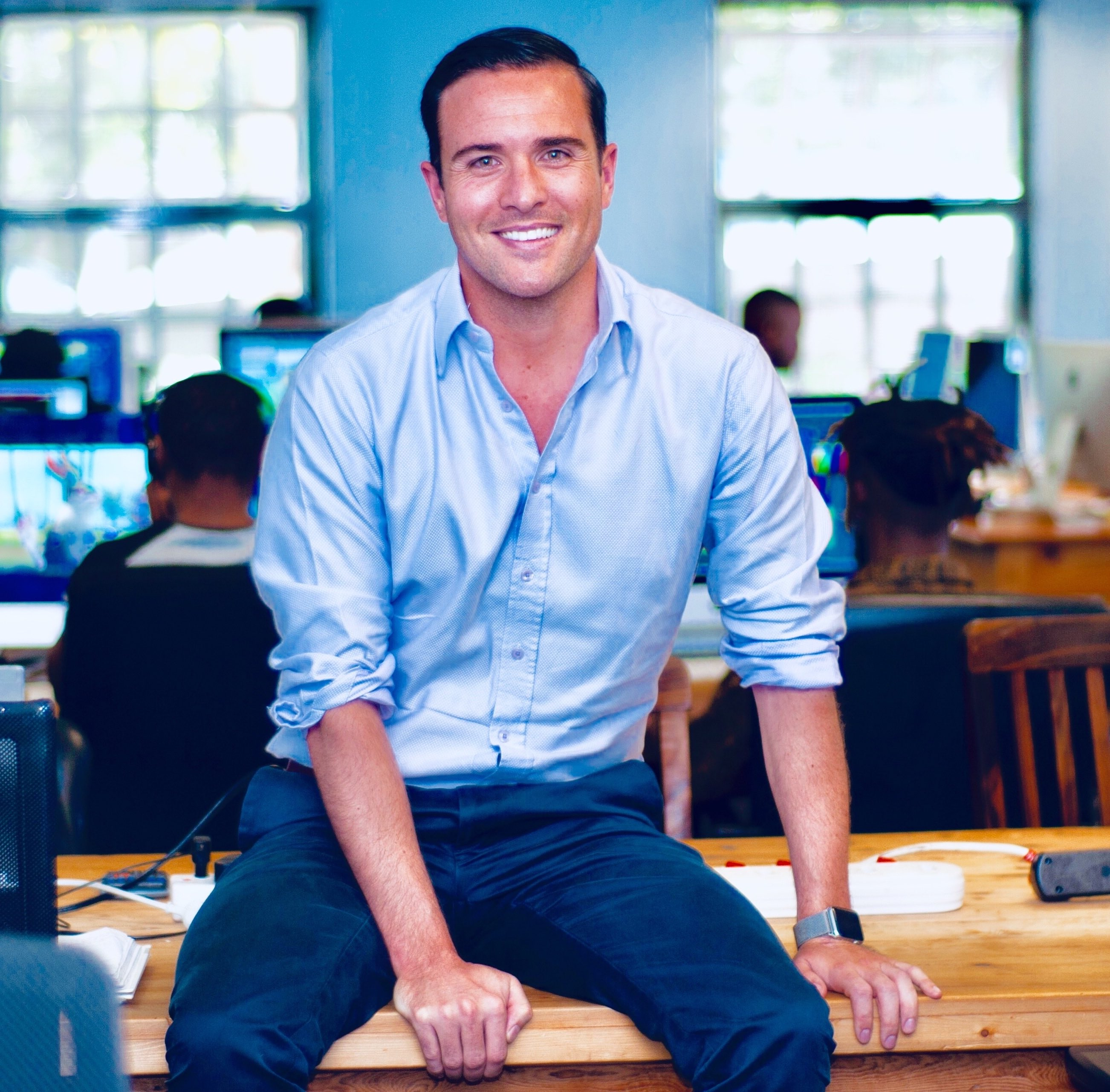
Varady with this team

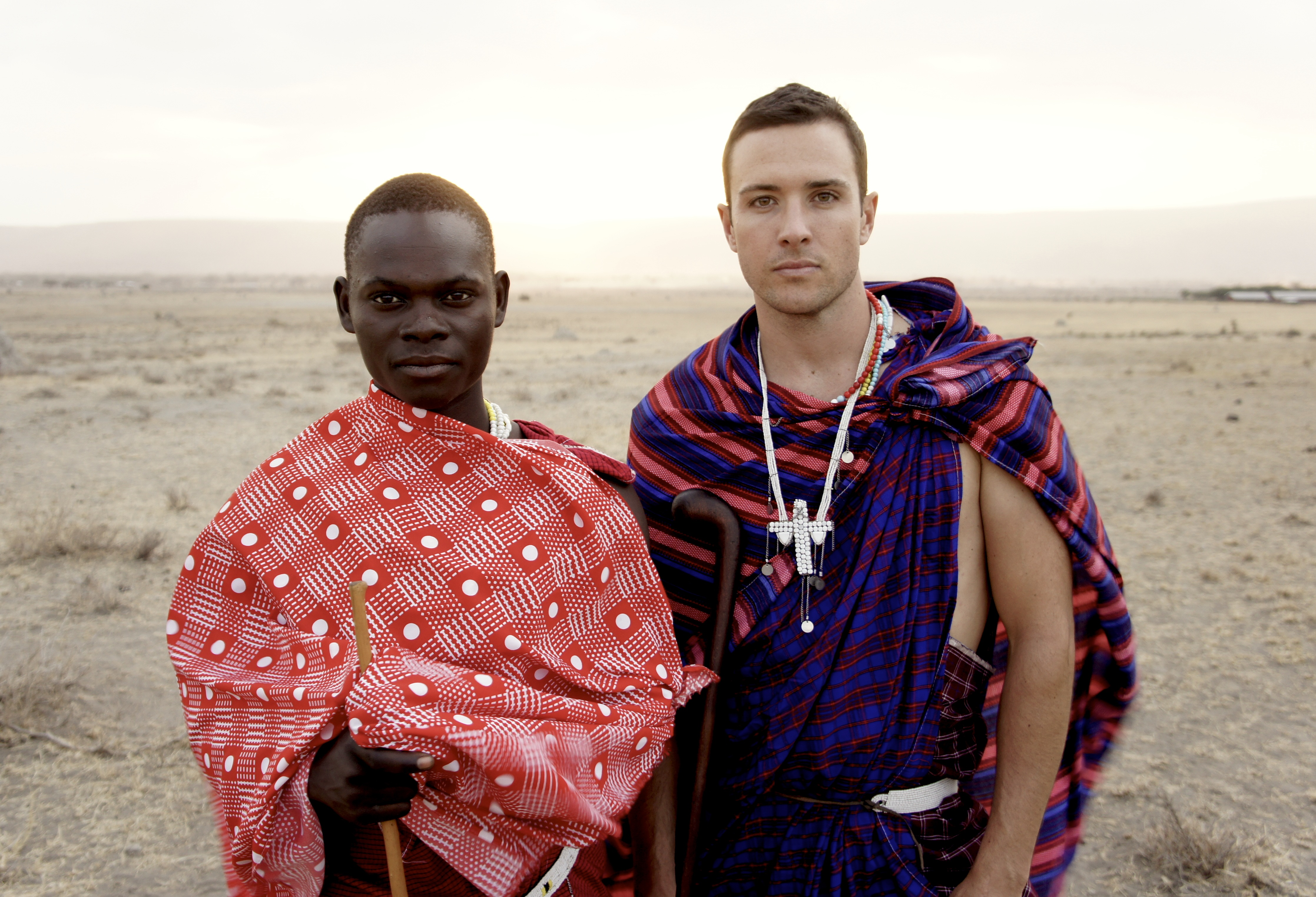
Jonathan Okwir and Varady featured on the Foxtel/Netflix documentary "Road to Freedom Peak"

Corrin Varady is an author and Edtech entrepreneur.

Varady founded a digital education company, IDEA Digital Education in 2015.

== Education ==
Varady holds two master's degrees (Università Commerciale Luigi Bocconi/University of New South Wales and the London School of Economics) with First Class Honours and a PhD at the London School of Economics. Varady's book published by Palgrave Macmillan is titled US Foreign Policy and the Multinational Force in Lebanon: Vigorous Self Defense and challenges the use of military force in peacekeeping missions. He has lectured at both the University of Cape Town and Witwatersrand University, South Africa. He has also written for the Huffington Post.

== Career ==
=== IDEA Digital Education ===
Varady founded IDEA Digital Education to create and deliver STEM fields digital education content to primary and secondary students across Africa and the Middle East. The Company currently has 127 team members across 6 countries with over 1800 curriculum topics, 38,000 animations, videos and interactive activities as well as over 10,000 assessments. Together with South Africa's national Department of Basic Education and the Western Cape Government, IDEA has launched aligned digital content and training programs for government school teachers and students. IDEA has 257,000 active users and over 1.4mil subscribers. IDEA is an authorised global Microsoft Gold IP Co-Sell Education partner for content. Through this work, Varady has been an advocate for increasing technology in schools and has been outspoken in his views on education, extreme racism, literacy and the 4th Industrial Revolution. Varady is one of the Stanford University Seed Transformation CEOs for 2019 and IDEA has been selected by the Agence française de développement for the social and inclusion business program for 2019.

=== World Youth Education Trust ===
Corrin founded the World Youth Education Trust, registered in the United Kingdom, Tanzania, Uganda and Australia which supports the education of students across East Africa to support the education of marginalized students across East Africa and where his most significant work focused on the reintegration of child soldiers into education and leadership programs. Varady established an education and counselling centre for former child soldiers in the Otuke District and provides education sponsorships for students across East Africa. WYET has also built the WYET Ngunini Education Centre focusing on Numeracy and Literacy development for Maasai students in Northern Tanzania.

Previously, Varady produced the international documentary, "The Road to Freedom Peak", a journey between himself and a WYET-sponsored former child soldier riding their bicycles across Uganda and Tanzania, climbing Mt Kilimanjaro and ending with a meeting with Prince Philip in London. The documentary was directed by filmmaker Max Pugh and narrated by Djimon Hounsou. It was received with critical acclaim. The documentary aired on Foxtel and Netflix globally.

=== Awards and honours ===
Varady was named the Young Alumni of the year 2015 for the University of New South Wales, Australia and a featured "Why Not?" Ambassador for the Business School in 2015-2016. Varady was an Australia Day Ambassador for the New South Wales Government. Varady was selected to present at the global tech summit called RISE, in Hong Kong in July 2018, where he delivered IDEA Digital Education's global growth strategy. In 2019, he was the Chairperson of the Education Innovation Summit in South Africa.
