= Dictionary of Literary Biography =

Biographical dictionary dedicated to literature

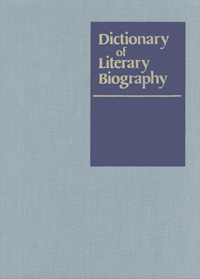
Generic cover design for the DLB series

The Dictionary of Literary Biography is a specialist biographical dictionary dedicated to literature. Published by Gale, the 375-volume set covers a wide variety of literary topics, periods, and genres, with a focus on American and British literature.

== Purpose and scope ==
The series editors write that "Our purpose is to make literature and its creators better understood and more accessible to students and the reading public, while satisfying the needs of teachers and researchers." They define literature as "the intellectual commerce of a nation; not merely belles lettres but as that ample and complex process by which ideas are generated, shaped, and transmitted." (emphasis in original) The series thus includes biographies of historians, journalists, publishers, book collectors, and screenwriters. Each volume is overseen by an expert in the field, and each volume contains approximately 30 entries around 4,000 to 6,000 words long. The biographies contain basic information, such as birth and death dates, a bibliography of the author's works, and a "further reading" list of sources on the author and his or her works. Each volume is illustrated by relevant drawings, paintings, or photographs of the authors as well as title pages of their works.

As of 2006, the series had 375 volumes, which included 23 yearbooks and 45 documentary volumes. Altogether, the series included 13,500 author biographies. The DLB exists in both print and electronic versions. As of 2006, approximately 85 percent of the series was online.

== History ==
The project was proposed by Frederick G. Ruffner, president of Gale, to the company Bruccoli Clark, in November 1975. After a few sample entries were written, an advisory board was appointed to design the format of the entire series. The first volume was published in 1978. DLB Yearbooks were published between 1981 and 2002 to keep the series up-to-date. These have now been discontinued. The series is currently published and distributed by Thomson Gale, but produced in Columbia, South Carolina by Bruccoli Clark Layman, a company composed of the well-known scholars Matthew J. Bruccoli and Richard Layman and the now deceased businessman, C. E. Frazer Clark, Jr.

== Reception ==
Michael Rogers wrote that "it is hands-down the best overall literary reference work ever published" but that many reference librarians had probably never heard of it. Choice has named the DLB an Outstanding Academic Book four times and American Library Association's Reference and User Services Association has twice named it as an Outstanding Reference Source. The American Library Association Guide to Reference called it "An indispensable reference tool for literary research in far-reaching genres and crossing political borders, the articles in this series are often the first critical and biographical treatment of a literary figure".
