= The Andreas Kapsalis Trio =

- Origin: Chicago, Illinois, United States
- Years active: 2001 - present
- Labels: O.I.E Records; Dot to Dot Management
- Members: Andreas Kapsalis; James Gallagher; Darren Garvey
- Website: The Andreas Kapsalis Trio

The Andreas Kapsalis Trio is an American acoustic ensemble formed by acoustic guitarist Andreas Kapsalis, drummer/percussionist James Gallagher and multi-instrumentalist Darren Garvey.

== Discography ==
- The Andreas Kapsalis Trio (2004)
- Original Scores (2008)

== Film work ==
In between albums, the group toured the country and composed music for films. Kapsalis was awarded a Fellowship Grant to attend the Sundance Film Composers Lab in 2005 and chosen to compose the film score for the documentary Black Gold which premiered at The Sundance Film Festival in 2006.
Other films Kapsalis has scored include Mulberry Street, Mexican Sunrise, Retaliation, and most recently, Pig Business.
