= Omnigraphics =

American publishing company

- Parent company: Infobase Publishing
- Founded: 1985
- Founder: Frederick Gale Ruffner, Jr. and Peter Ruffner
- Country of origin: United States
- Headquarters location: Detroit, Michigan
- Nonfiction topics: Reference
- Official website: omnigraphics.com

Omnigraphics is a publishing company located in Detroit, Michigan, founded by Frederick Gale Ruffner, Jr. and his son Peter in 1985. The company was acquired by Aggregate Intelligence in 2015. It was sold to Infobase Publishing in 2022.
