= General Detroit Corporation =

Defunct American motor vehicle manufacturer

General Detroit Corporation was an American manufacturer of fire trucks and fire extinguishers from 1903 to 2001.

== History ==
Harry W. Huthsing founded the company in 1903 in St Louis as the National Belting & Hose Company. The name General Manufacturing Company was adopted in 1905. Production of fire extinguishers began in 1918. The company changed its name to the General Fire Truck Corporation in 1926 and began collaborating on fire trucks with other manufacturers, including Pierce-Arrow and Studebaker.

Throughout its production history General used commercial truck chassis from Chevrolet, GMC, Ford, Dodge, Diamond-T, International, Reo, and other manufacturers.

The company moved to Detroit in 1936 and was renamed the General Detroit Corporation in 1942. General-Pacific Corporation, a Los Angeles-based subsidiary was established in 1937.

The last General fire truck was built in Detroit in 1956 and the name was changed to General Fire Extinguisher Corporation the following year. General Fire Extinguisher Corporation filed for chapter 11 bankruptcy in 2000 and chapter 7 in 2001.
