= Speakit Films =

- Speakit Films Official Logo
- Company type: Film production company
- Industry: Documentary films, feature films, independent films
- Founders: Nick Francis and Marc Francis
- Headquarters: United Kingdom
- Website: www.speakit.org

Speakit Films is a British film production company established in 2004 by writer, director and producer team Nick Francis and Marc J. Francis.

The company is best known for the award-winning 2006 Sundance hit Black Gold and the acclaimed BBC, ARTE and VPRO co-production When China Met Africa. Their work has been supported by the Sundance Institute, the Channel 4 British Documentary Film Foundation, the UK Film Council, CNC and EU Media Fund.

Speakit's films have been released in cinemas and on television in over 40 countries (e.g.: BBC, Channel 4, Arte France, PBS, NHK, Al-Jazeera, NRK, SVT, VPRO, YLE, National Geographic and SABC).

In addition to producing feature documentaries, Speakit makes short films and works with organizations to help them tell their own story.

== Productions ==
- Black Gold (2006)
- When China Met Africa (2010)
- Madam President (2012)
- A Life on Hold (2012)
- Rain is Beautiful (2012)
