= Ja A. Jahannes =

American psychologist (1942–2015)

Ja Arthur Jahannes (August 25, 1942 – July 5, 2015) was a professor at Savannah State University in Savannah, Georgia and the pastor of the Abyssinia Missionary Baptist Church in Savannah. He was a prolific playwright, music composer, essayist, and poet, a frequent theatre director and international lecturer, and a pioneer of Black psychology.

Jahannes was raised in Baltimore. He earned a bachelor's degree from Lincoln University, a historically black university in Pennsylvania, in 1964. He then earned two master's degrees from Hampton University in Virginia in 1966 and a doctorate in 1972 from the University of Delaware. He joined the Savannah State faculty in 1981 as dean of the School of Humanities there.

His wife, artist Clara Agüero Ortiz, also an educator, worked as a professor of Fine Arts at Savannah State.
