= Black Gold (2006 film) =

2006 documentary film

- Directed by: Marc James Francis, Nick Francis
- Written by: Marc Francis, Nick Francis
- Produced by: Christopher Hird, Marc Francis, Nick Francis
- Starring: Tadesse Meskela
- Edited by: Hugh Williams
- Music by: Andreas Kapsalis
- Production company: Speakit Films
- Release date: 2006 (United States)
- Running time: 78 min.
- Languages: Amharic, Oromiffa, and English with English subtitles
- Budget: 760,000 USD

Black Gold is a 2006 documentary film that follows the efforts of an Ethiopian coffee union manager as he travels the world to obtain a better price for his workers' coffee beans. The film was directed and produced by Marc James Francis and Nick Francis from Speakit Films, and co-produced by Christopher Hird. It premiered at the 2006 Sundance Film Festival.

== Synopsis ==
The film focuses on the coffee growers of the Oromia Region of southern and western Ethiopia, the birthplace of coffee. It follows Tadesse Meskela, the General Manager of the Oromia Coffee Farmers Cooperative Union, as he visits coffee-growing regions in Sidamo and Oromia (including the Kilenso Mokonisa Cooperative in the Bule Hora woreda in the Borena Zone of the Oromia Region), as well as a coffee processing center, a coffee auction house, and his union's headquarters in Addis Ababa. He also travels to England and the United States in an effort to promote Ethiopian coffee by eliminating the numerous middlemen. There is also a scene where coffee farmers pray to God for a higher price, which was filmed at the Negele Gorbitu Cooperative, located near Irgachefe in the Abaya woreda of the Borena Zone. The Ethiopian coffee farmers speak about their lives, with one explaining that he is cutting down his coffee plants and planting khat (a plant containing cathinone, an amphetamine-like stimulant) instead, due to the low price he is getting for coffee because of the explosion in the number of coffee farmers across the globe, and the comparatively higher price he can get for khat.

The film also includes footage of the New York Board of Trade, a commodity-trading floor in New York City, where the "C" international benchmark price of coffee is set each business day based on supply and demand, and explores the effects that these international prices (which by 2006 were at an all-time low) have on Ethiopian coffee growers. Other footage was shot at the first Starbucks and the World Barista Championship at the 2005 Specialty Coffee Association of America conference in Seattle; and at a café and the Illy coffee company in Trieste, Italy. These scenes stand in stark contrast to the footage of the impoverished conditions faced by the Ethiopian coffee farmers and their families.

== Production ==
In July 2003, Nick Francis and Marc James Francis travelled to Ethiopia and started making the film. The meeting with Tadesse Meskela, the manager of Oromia Coffee Farmers Co-operative Union, was a decisive moment in the production of the film. The inspiring passion and determination of Tadesse, along with his continuous efforts to improve the lives of the farmers he represents, made Nick Francis and Marc James Francis decide much further in the production process to centre the film narrative around Tadesse's journey, his character functioning as a guide into the coffee world. The Ethiopian footage was filmed on two occasions (in 2003 and 2005), for six weeks each time.

After the first shoot in Ethiopia, the crew flew to Cancun to document the meetings of the World Trade Organization, where pivotal decisions that affect Africa's economy and development were being made in setting the trade rules and where the struggle for fairer international trade rules was played out. Unprecedented, that year developing countries refused to be forced into signing agreements that were against their interests, and the WTO talks completely collapsed. After the team's return to the UK, they spent the following months developing a rough cut of Black Gold. During these months, the direction of the film took shape, along with the rest of the necessary shoots meant to develop the thrust of the narrative. In 2005, the team returned to Ethiopia for further shoots.

Although Starbucks, Sara Lee, Procter & Gamble, Kraft, and Nestlé—the world's largest sellers of coffee—are mentioned in the film, all five companies declined invitations to be interviewed for the film. By the end of 2005, the final cut of Black Gold was done and officially premiered during the 2006's edition of Sundance Film Festival.

== Music ==
Andreas Kapsalis, whom Marc James Francis and Nick Francis met during the Sundance Documentary Composers Lab, wrote the final soundtrack. In doing so, he used in part Mathew Coldrick's Ethiopian instrumental samples, recorded from Ethiopia. Joe Henson, Kunja Chatterton, and Mathew Herbert also contributed to the soundtrack.

== Awards and nominations ==
- WINNER: Best Achievement in Production - British Independent Film Awards 2007
- NOMINEE: Best Documentary - British Independent Film Awards 2007
- NOMINEE: Best Debut Director - British Independent Film Awards 2007
- NOMINEE: Sundance Film Festival Grand Jury Prize (2006)
- NOMINEE: Index on Censorship Film Awards (2008)
- Official Selection: Melbourne International Film Festival (2006)
- Official Selection: Rio de Janeiro International Film Festival (2006)
- Official Selection: BFI London Film Festival (2006)
- Official Selection: Panafrican Film and Television Festival of Ouagadougou
- Official Selection: Rome Film Festival
- Official Selection: Hot Docs Canadian International Documentary Festival
- Official Selection: True/False Film Festival (2006)
- Official Selection: New Zealand International Film Festival (2006)

== Distribution ==
Black Gold has been released in the cinema and on DVD in over 40 countries: in the UK (Dogwoof), US (California Newsreel), Canada (Mongral Media), Australia (Madman), Germany, Spain, Netherlands, Scandinavia, and Japan. The film has also been broadcast on TV stations around the world including US (ITVS: Independent Lens), UK (Channel 4), Japan (NHK), Israel (DBS/YES), New Zealand (Documentary Channel), South Africa (SABC), South Korea (EBS), and the Middle East (Al-jazeera). It continues to be screened around the world.

Black Gold went on to be seen in over 60 international film festivals including London, Rome, Berlin, Melbourne, Hong Kong, and Rio de Janeiro and has secured major broadcast deals around the world including Channel 4 (UK), PBS/Independent Lens (US), Documentary Channel (Canada), NHK (Japan), and Al-jazeera (Middle East).

Black Gold has attracted wide coverage in the media including features on CNN, BBC World, BBC News 24, Sky News, Bloomberg, The Observer, The Times, The Daily Telegraph, New York Times, LA Times, The Washington Post, and South China Morning Post.

== Reception and impact ==
In the first few weeks after the premiere, the film helped to generate donations approximately up to $25,000. The dilapidated school featured in the film was built.

Tadesse Meskela, the main character in Black Gold, was able to increase the market price for his cooperative union's coffee. Tadesse Meskela was invited to 10 Downing Street, where he took his message directly to Tony Blair.

After seeing the film, the UN have invited Tadesse to New York to do a presentation about his co-operatives at the 46th Session of the Commission for Social Development.

Black Gold was screened at the World Bank and European Union, as part of debates about trade policy and development. The Ethiopian ambassadors based at Berlin, Washington, D.C., and London attended screenings.

Black Gold was the first film to receive funding from BritDoc.

On review aggregator website Rotten Tomatoes, the film holds an approval rating of 84% based on 49 reviews, with an average rating of 6.7/10.

== Corporate response to Black Gold ==
Since the first showing of Black Gold during Sundance, Starbucks sent people to screenings of the film in what has been called by one journalist "going on a charm offensive". As the film became more and more popular, Starbucks flew Tadesse and four other African coffee producers to their Seattle headquarters for a weekend conference, which was seen by many as a PR stunt. Further, just before the film premiered at the London Film Festival in October 2006, a memo received by Starbucks staff from the headquarters leaked to the Black Gold forum. The internal memo was sent out to inform all Starbucks employees that Black Gold was "incomplete and inaccurate".
