= Sterling Stuckey =

American historian (1932–2018)

P. Sterling Stuckey (March 2, 1932 – August 15, 2018) was an African-American professor of history, and a Distinguished Professor Emeritus at the University of California, Riverside (UCR), specializing in American slavery, the arts and history, and Afro-American intellectual and cultural history.

== Early life and education ==
Ples Sterling Stuckey Jr. was born to African-American parents in Memphis, Tennessee on March 2, 1932. His mother, Elma Earline Johnson Stuckey, was a schoolteacher, and his father, Ples Sterling Stuckey Sr. worked as a waiter at a major hotel in Memphis. The family moved to Chicago, Illinois in 1945.

Stuckey earned his Ph.D. in history from Northwestern University in Chicago in 1972.

== Career ==
Stuckey was appointed associate professor at Northwestern in 1971, and became a full professor in 1977. He was Hill Foundation Visiting Research Professor at the University of Minnesota in 1970–71; a visiting research fellow at UCLA in 1975–76; an Andrew Mellon Fellow at the Center for Advanced Study in the Behavioral Sciences, Stanford, in 1980–81; a senior fellow at the Smithsonian Institution in 1987–88; and a fellow at the Humanities Research Institute, University of California, Irvine, in 1991–92.

Stuckey was a professor at the University of California, Riverside (UCR) from 1989 until he retired in 2004.

To mark the 25th anniversary edition (in 2012) of his seminal book Slave Culture, The Journal of African American History published a 26-page interview with Stuckey by historian David Roediger.

== Books ==
- Slave Culture: Nationalist Theory & the Foundations of Black America, 1987, ISBN 0195042654; 2nd edition 2013
- Going Through the Storm: The Influence of African American Art in History, 1994
- (with Linda Kerrigan Salvucci) Call to Freedom: Beginnings to 1877, 2003, ISBN 0030654874
- (with Linda Kerrigan Salvucci) Call to Freedom: Beginnings to 1914 (3rd edition)
- Paul Boyer, Sterling Stuckey (2005). American Nation: In the Modern Era. Holt, Rinehart, & Winston.
- African Culture and Melville's Art: The Creative Process in Benito Cereno and Moby-Dick, 2011
