= Infobase =

American provider of reference books

- Founded: 1941; 85 years ago
- Country of origin: United States
- Headquarters location: New York City, New York
- Distribution: self-distributed
- Publication types: Books
- Imprints: Facts On File; Films for the Humanities & Sciences; Cambridge Educational; Chelsea House Publishing; Bloom's Literary Criticism; Ferguson Publishing; Omnigraphics; Vault.com
- Owners: Northlane Capital Partners, Centre Lane Partners, and management
- Official website: infobase.com

Infobase is an American publisher of databases, reference book titles and textbooks geared towards the North American library, secondary school, and university-level curriculum markets. Infobase operates a number of prominent imprints, including Facts On File, Films for the Humanities & Sciences, Cambridge Educational, Ferguson Publishing, Vault Law, Omnigraphics, and Chelsea House (which also serves as the imprint for the special collection series, "Bloom's Literary Criticism", under the direction of literary critic Harold Bloom).

== History ==
Facts On File has been publishing books since 1941. It was owned by CCH from 1965 to 1993. The publisher publishes general reference and trade books. Facts On File acquired Ferguson Publishing, which specializes in career education works, in 2003.

Chelsea House was founded in 1966. It is known for multi-volume reference works.

The private equity firm Veronis Suhler Stevenson bought Facts on File and Chelsea House in 2005. Infobase bought Films for the Humanities & Sciences in 2007 and the World Almanac in 2009. Infobase acquired Learn360 in 2012. In 2017, Infobase acquired The Mailbox lesson plans and Learning magazine. Veronis Suhler Stevenson sold Infobase to another private equity firm, Centre Lane Partners, in 2018. Northlane Capital Partners became the majority owner in 2022.

Infobase acquired Credo Reference in 2018. The World Almanac was sold to SkyHorse Publishing in 2020. Infobase acquired careers website Firsthand (including Vault.com), in 2021. Infobase acquired Omnigraphics in 2022.

As well as nonfiction works in print, Infobase and its imprints publish a selection of works in digital, audiovisual and online database formats.

== Imprints ==
- Facts On File
- Films for the Humanities & Sciences
- Cambridge Educational
- Chelsea House Publishing
- Bloom's Literary Criticism
- Ferguson Publishing
- Omnigraphics
