= List of coffee companies =

This is a worldwide list of notable coffee companies that roast or distribute coffee.

== List ==
Company name	Year founded	Location	Country	Roaster?	Retailer?	Subsidiary brands
7 Brew	2017	Rogers, Arkansas	United States		Yes	
85C Bakery Cafe	2004	Taipei	Taiwan			
Ajinomoto	1917	Tokyo	Japan	Yes		Birdy
An Giang Coffee		Long Thành	Vietnam	Yes		
Aroma Espresso Bar	1994	Jerusalem	Israel	Yes	Yes	
Barcaffe	1970	Slovenia	Slovenia	Yes		Owned by Droga Kolinska
Bewley's	1840	Dublin	Ireland	Yes	Yes	Java City and Rebecca's Cafe
Bigface Coffee	2020	Bay Lake, Florida	United States			
Black Ivory Coffee	2012	Thailand	Thailand	Yes		The coffee was first produced at Golden Triangle Asian Elephant Foundation in 2012
Blue Bottle Coffee	2002	Oakland, California	United States	Yes	Yes	
Bridgehead Coffee	1981	Ottawa, Ontario	Canada	Yes	Yes	
Café Britt	1985	Costa Rica	Costa Rica	Yes		
Café Coffee Day	1996	Bengaluru, India	India	Yes	Yes	Café Coffee Day, Coffee Day Express, Coffee Day Beverages, Fresh & Ground
Cafédirect	1991	UK	United Kingdom			
Caffè Nero	1997	London	United Kingdom	Yes	Yes	
Caffé Vita Coffee Roasting Company	1995	Seattle, Washington	United States	Yes		
Cameron's Coffee	1978	Shakopee, Minnesota	United States	Yes		
Caribou Coffee	1992	Brooklyn Center, Minnesota	United States	Yes	Yes	
The Coffee Bean & Tea Leaf	1963	Los Angeles	United States	Yes	Yes	Owned by Jollibee Foods Corporation
Coffee Beanery	1976	Flushing, Michigan	United States			
Coffee Island	1999	Patras	Greece	Yes	Yes	
Colectivo Coffee Roasters	1993	Milwaukee, Wisconsin	United States	Yes	Yes	
Cometeer Coffee	2015	Gloucester, Massachusetts	United States	No	Yes	
Comfoods	1951	Makati	Philippines			Café Puro
Community Coffee	1919	Baton Rouge, Louisiana	United States	Yes	Yes	CC's Coffee House
Compass Coffee	2014	Washington, DC	United States	Yes	Yes	Simple Syrups, Simple Sanitizer, Crown Tea
Coop Kaffe	1953	Oslo	Norway	Yes		Owned by Coop Norge Handel AS
Costa Coffee	1971	Dunstable	United Kingdom			
Dallmayr	1700	Munich	Germany			
Death Wish Coffee	2008	Saratoga Springs, New York	United States			
Delta Cafés	1961	Campo Maior	Portugal	Yes	Yes	
Diedrich Coffee	1972	Irvine, California	United States			
Douwe Egberts	1753	Joure and Utrecht	Netherlands		Yes	Kanis & Gunnik, Van Nelle
Dulce Café	1980	South Africa	South Africa	Yes	Yes	
Dunkin' Donuts	1950	Quincy, Massachusetts	United States		Yes	Retail grocery products licensed for manufacture by The J.M. Smucker Co.
Dunn Bros	1987	St. Paul, Minnesota	United States			
Dutch Bros. Coffee	1992	Grants Pass, Oregon	United States			
Eight O'Clock Coffee	1859	Montvale, New Jersey	United States	Yes	Yes	Originally created by The Great Atlantic & Pacific Tea Company; became part of the Tata family in 2006
Ellis Coffee Company	1854	Philadelphia, Pennsylvania	United States			Family owned and operated
Equal Exchange	1986	West Bridgewater, Massachusetts	United States			
Figaro Coffee Company	1993	Manila	Philippines		Yes	Sister company: Boyd's Coffee Company; serves Vietnamese coffee under the name of Kape Indochine.
Franck	1892	Croatia	Croatia	Yes	Yes	
Gloria Jean's Coffees	1979	Castle Hill, New South Wales	Australia	Yes	Yes	
Harischandra Mills	1953	Matara, Sri Lanka	Sri Lanka	Yes	Yes	
Highlands Coffee	1998	Hanoi, Vietnam	Vietnam	Yes	Yes	Joint venture of Jollibee Foods Corporation and Viet Thai International
Hills Bros. Coffee	1878	US	United States	Yes	Yes	
Illy	1933	Italy	Italy	Yes	Yes	
Indian Coffee House	1940s	India	India		Yes	
Jittery Joe's	1994	Athens, Georgia	United States			
The J.M. Smucker Company	1897	Orrville, Ohio	United States	Yes	No	Folgers, Millstone Coffee, Café Bustelo, Dunkin' at Home, Kava, Life is Good, Medaglia D'Oro, Pilon
Juan Valdez Café	2002	Bogotá	Colombia	Yes	Yes	
Julius Meinl	1862	Austria	Austria	Yes	Yes	
Keurig Dr Pepper	1996	US	United States	Yes	Yes	Barista Prima Coffeehouse, Green Mountain Coffee Roasters, Keurig Coffee Collective, The Original Donut Shop, Tully's Coffee
Koa Coffee Plantation	1997	Captain Cook, Hawaii	United States			Kobrick Coffee Company 1920 New York, New York, US, Lee Kobrick, Steven Kobrick, Jerilyn Kobrick
Kraft Foods	1853	Tarrytown, New York	United States	Yes		Café HAG, General Foods International, Gevalia, Jacobs, Kenco, Maxwell House, Nabob, Sanka, Tassimo
La Colombe Coffee Roasters	1994	Philadelphia, Pennsylvania	United States	Yes	Yes	
Landwer coffee	1919	Holon	Israel	Yes	Yes	Landwer Café
Lavazza	1895	Italy	Italy	Yes	Yes	
Louisa Coffee	2006	Taipei	Taiwan			
Machwitz Kaffee	1883	Hanover	Germany	Yes	Yes	Founded in Gdańsk
Massimo Zanetti	1973	Bologna	Italy	Yes	Yes	Chase & Sanborn Coffee Company, Chock full o'Nuts, Hills Brothers Coffee, Kauai Coffee, MJB, Segafredo Zanetti
Matthew Algie	1864	UK	United Kingdom			
Maxwell House	1892	US	United States	Yes	No	
Mayora Indah	1977	Jakarta	Indonesia			Kopiko, Torabika
Meira Oy	1914	Finland	Finland	Yes		Owned by Massimo Zanetti
Melitta	1908	Minden	Germany	Yes	No	
Mikel Coffee Company	2008	Larissa	Greece	Yes	Yes	
Miko Coffee	1801	Belgium	Belgium	Yes		
Monmouth Coffee Company	1978	London	United Kingdom	Yes	Yes	
Mystic Monk Coffee	2007	Wyoming, US	United States	Yes	Yes	
Nestlé	1866	Vevey	Switzerland	Yes	Yes	Nescafé, Nespresso, Seattle's Best Coffee, Starbucks at Home, Taster's Choice
New England Coffee	1916	Malden, Massachusetts	United States	Yes	Yes	
North End	2011	Dhaka	Bangladesh	Yes	Yes	
OldTown White Coffee	1995	Ipoh	Malaysia	Yes	Yes	
Paulig	1876	Finland	Finland	Yes		
Per'La Specialty Roasters	2015	Miami, Florida	United States	Yes	Yes	
Philz Coffee	2003	San Francisco, California	United States	Yes	Yes	
Red Diamond	1906	Birmingham, Alabama	United States	Yes	Yes	
Revelator Coffee	2013	Birmingham, Alabama	United States	Yes	Yes	Wired Puppy, Octane Coffee
Second Cup	1975	Mississauga, Ontario	Canada	Yes	Yes	
Starbucks	1971	Seattle, Washington	United States	Yes	Yes	Tazo
Strauss	1930	Petah Tikva	Israel	Yes	Yes	Elite Instant Coffee, Elite Turkish Coffee, Platinum
Tchibo	1949	Hamburg	Germany	Yes	Yes	
Tim Hortons	1964	Hamilton, Ontario	Canada	Yes	Yes	
Trung Nguyên	1996	Buôn Ma Thuột	Vietnam	Yes	Yes	G7 (instant coffee), Weasel (kopi luwak), Legendee (simulated kopi luwak)
Tully's Coffee	1992	Seattle, Washington	United States			
Universal Robina	1954	Quezon City	Philippines			Blend 45, Great Taste
The Unseen Bean	2004	Boulder, Colorado	United States	Yes	Yes	
Van Houtte	1919	Canada	Canada	Yes	Yes	
Vinacafe	1969	Biên Hòa	Vietnam	Yes		
Wings Food	2000	Surabaya	Indonesia			Top Coffee, Top White Coffee, Top Cappuccino
Yit Foh Tenom Coffee	1960	Tenom, Sabah	Malaysia	Yes	Yes	

== See also ==
- List of coffeehouse chains
