= Ellis Coffee Company =

United States coffee roaster and retailer headquartered in Philadelphia

- Company type: Private
- Industry: Coffee
- Founded: 1854
- Founder: Allen Cuthbert
- Headquarters: 2835 Bridge St, Philadelphia, Pennsylvania, United States
- Key people: John Ellis (Previous Owner); Adam Kestenbaum (President); Eugene Kestenbaum (Chairman of the Board)
- Products: Cold brew coffee; Coffee Equipment; Espresso; Ground coffee; Single-serve coffee container; Sustainable coffee; Whole bean coffee
- Website: www.elliscoffee.com

Ellis Coffee Company is a United States coffee roaster and wholesaler headquartered in Philadelphia, USA. The company currently ships its coffee products to businesses in the C-Store, Food Service and Food Service Distribution (including Office Coffee Service and Vending) segments nationwide.

== History ==
Ellis Coffee's history dates back to 1854 when Allen Cuthbert established a store specializing in Chinese Teas & Coffees imports at 22 South 8th Street in Philadelphia. This marked the modest inception of what would eventually become a well-established institution in the Philadelphia coffee scene.

In 1871, Allen Cuthbert appointed Francis Bond as his successor, and Francis Bond, in turn, assumed leadership, renaming the company after himself and relocating.

In 1908, following the passing of Francis Bond, the company's the running of the company was taken over by a 13-year-old employee named John Ellis, who was able to purchase the company.

Today, Ellis Coffee is led by Adam Kestenbaum, a fourth-generation family member, who serves as the company's President. In 2010, his father Gene assumed the role of board chairman.

== See also ==
- Intelligentsia Coffee & Tea
- Counter Culture Coffee
- Stumptown Coffee
