= Third-wave coffee =

Coffee movement emphasizing quality

Third-wave coffee is a term primarily in the United States coffee industry emphasizing higher quality, single-origin farms and light roast to bring out distinctive flavors. Though the term was coined in 1999, the approach originated in the 1970s, with roasters such as the Coffee Connection.

== History ==
The term "third-wave coffee" is generally attributed to the coffee professional Trish Rothgeb, who used the term in a 2003 article, alluding to the three waves of feminism. However, the specialty coffee broker and author, Timothy J. Castle, had already used the term in an article titled "Coffee's Third Wave" that he wrote for the December 1999 / January 2000 issue of the magazine Tea & Coffee Asia. The first mention in the mainstream media was in 2005 in a National Public Radio piece about barista competitions.

In the first wave of coffee, coffee consumers generally did not differentiate by origin or beverage type. Instant coffee, grocery store canned coffee, and diner coffee were all hallmarks of first wave coffee. First wave coffee focuses on low price and consistent taste.

The second wave of coffee began with purveyors like Peet's Coffee & Tea of Berkeley, California, which in the late 1960s began sourcing from artisanal producers, and roasting and blending with a focus on highlighting not only countries of origin, but also their signature dark roast profile. Peet's Coffee inspired the founders of Starbucks of Seattle, Washington. The second wave of coffee introduced the concept of different origin countries to coffee consumption, beyond a generic cup of coffee. Fueled in large part by market competition between Colombian coffee producers and coffee producers from Brazil through the 1960s, coffee roasters highlighted flavor characteristics that varied depending on what countries coffees came from. While certain origin countries grew to be prized among coffee enthusiasts and professionals, the world's production of high-altitude grown arabica coffee, grown in countries within the tropical zone, became sought after as each country had particular flavor profiles that were considered interesting and desirable. In addition to country of origin, the second wave of coffee introduced coffee-based beverages to the wider coffee-consuming world, particularly those traditional to Italy made with espresso.

The first and second waves of coffee were characterized by at-home consumption. The first wave was pre-ground, vacuum-packed, mass-market cans from brands like Folgers and Maxwell House. The second wave offered consumers a fresh-roasted and bagged coffee purchased at a coffee shop like Starbucks or Peet's.

Third-wave coffee is associated with the concept of specialty coffee, referring either to specialty grades of green (raw and unroasted) coffee beans (distinct from commercial grade coffee), or specialty coffee beverages of high quality and craft.

=== United Kingdom ===
In the late twentieth century, instant coffee dominated the UK market. Inspired by the example of Starbucks, the Seattle Coffee Company opened in London in 1995, opening over 50 stores before being taken over by Starbucks in 1998. Flat White, an early third-wave café, opened in 2005 and James Hoffmann's third-wave roastery Square Mile opened in 2008.

From 2007 to 2009, the World Barista Championship was won by Londoners, starting with Hoffmann, and the 2010 edition of the competition was hosted in London. Hoffmann has since come to be regarded as a pioneer in the third-wave coffee movement in the UK, with The Globe and Mail describing him as "the godfather of London's coffee revolution".

=== Australia ===
The third wave of coffee has been popular in Australia. Melbourne is known as the "capital of coffee" with its many cafes.

Australians have won the World Barista Championship four times in 2003, 2015, 2022 and 2025.

== Use of the term ==
The third-wave of coffee has been chronicled by publications such as The New York Times, LA Weekly, Los Angeles Times, La Opinión and The Guardian.

In March 2008, the food critic Jonathan Gold of LA Weekly defined the third wave of coffee:

The first wave of American coffee culture was probably the 19th-century surge that put Folgers on every table, and the second was the proliferation, starting in the 1960s at Peet's and moving smartly through the Starbucks grande decaf latte, of espresso drinks and regionally labeled coffee. We are now in the third wave of coffee connoisseurship, where beans are sourced from farms instead of countries, roasting is about bringing out rather than incinerating the unique characteristics of each bean, and the flavor is clean and hard and pure.

The earlier term "specialty coffee" was coined in 1974, and refers narrowly to high-quality beans scoring 80 points or more on a 100-point scale.

== Status ==
Across the US and Canada, there are many third-wave roasters, and some stand-alone coffee shops or small chains that roast their own coffee. There are a few larger businesses, more prominent in roasting than in operating. The "Big Three of Third Wave Coffee" in the US are Intelligentsia Coffee & Tea of Chicago; Stumptown Coffee Roasters of Portland, Oregon; and Counter Culture Coffee of Durham, North Carolina, all of which engage in direct trade sourcing. Intelligentsia had seven bars – four in Chicago, three in Los Angeles, together with one "lab" in New York as of 2015. Stumptown had 11 bars: five bars in Portland, one in Seattle, two in New York, one in Los Angeles, one in Chicago, and one in New Orleans as of 2015. Counter Culture had eight regional training centers that do not function as retail stores: one in each of: Chicago, Atlanta, Asheville, Durham, Washington, D.C., Philadelphia, New York, and Boston at the time. By comparison, Starbucks had over 23,000 cafes worldwide as of 2015.

Both Intelligentsia Coffee & Tea and Stumptown Coffee Roasters were acquired by Peet's Coffee & Tea (itself part of JAB Holding Company) in 2015. At that time, Philz Coffee (headquartered in Oakland, California), Verve Coffee Roasters (headquartered in Santa Cruz, California) and Blue Bottle Coffee (headquartered in Oakland, California) were also considered major players in third-wave coffee.

In 2014, Starbucks invested around $20 million in a coffee roastery and tasting room in Seattle, targeting the third-wave market. Starbucks' standard cafes use automated espresso machines which are faster and require less training than conventional espresso machines used by third-wave competitors.

== See also ==
- Specialty foods
- Coffee wars
- Blue Bottle Coffee
- Counter Culture Coffee
- La Colombe Coffee Roasters
- Revelator Coffee
- Stumptown Coffee Roasters
- List of coffeehouse chains
- List of coffee companies
