= Intelligentsia Coffee & Tea =

American coffee roasting company

Intelligentsia Coffee

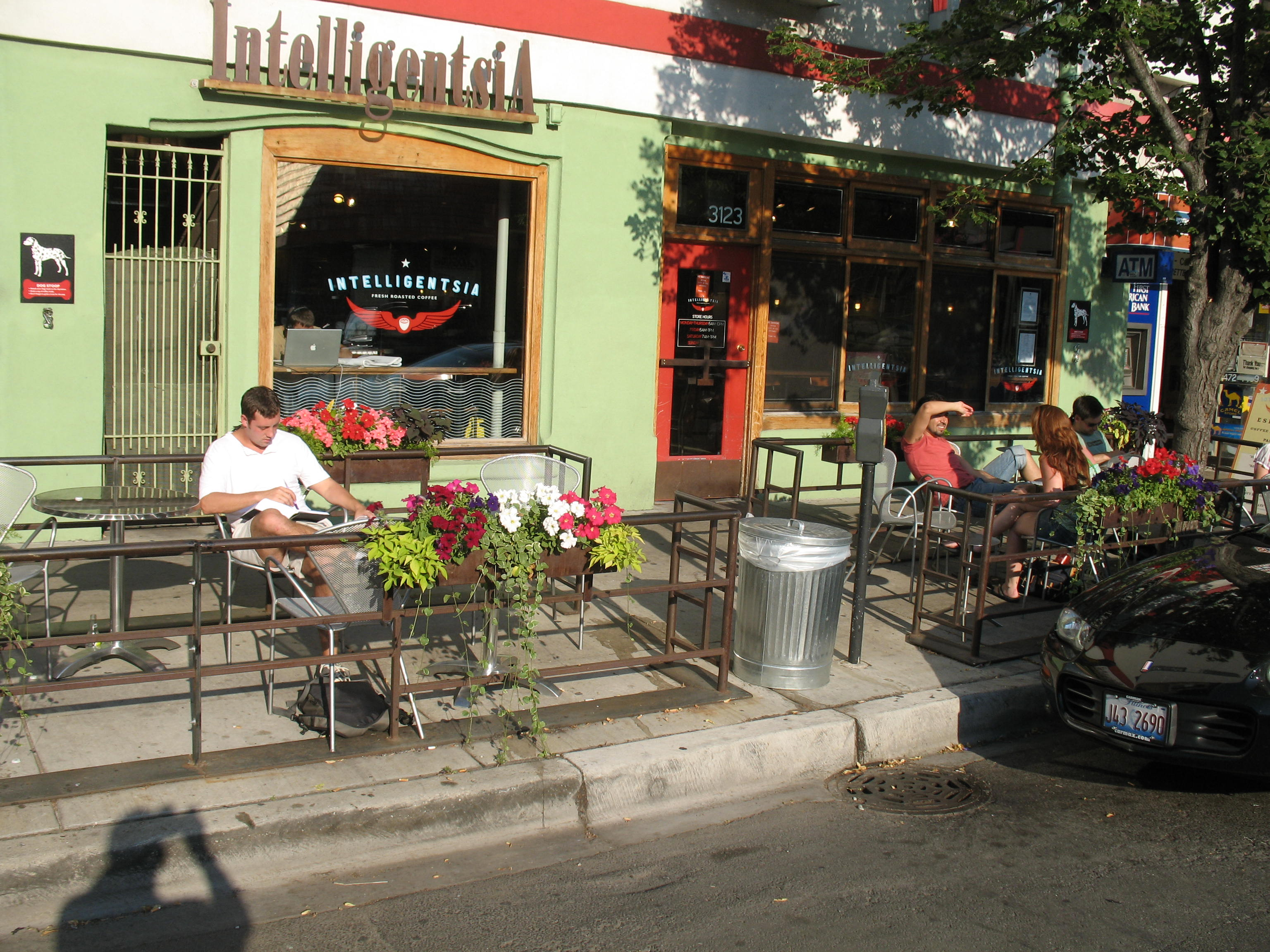
- The sidewalk cafe outside the coffee shop.
- Type: Subsidiary
- Industry: Restaurants
- Founded: 1995; 31 years ago
- Headquarters: Chicago, Illinois
- Number of locations: 16 stores (2026)
- Key people: Doug Zell and Emily Mange, founders James McLaughlin, CEO
- Products: Coffee, Tea
- Owner: JAB Holding Company
- Parent: JDE Peet's (2015–present)
- Website: intelligentsiacoffee.com

Intelligentsia Coffee is an American coffee roasting company and retailer based in Chicago, Illinois. Founded in 1995 by Doug Zell and Emily Mange, Intelligentsia is considered a major representative of third-wave coffee in the United States. In 2015, Peet's Coffee & Tea (itself part of JAB Holding Company) acquired a majority stake in the company.

== History and locations ==
Intelligentsia is headquartered at 1850 W. Fulton Street, Chicago, IL, and has several cafe retail locations throughout the Chicago area. They supply coffee to various Chicago-area cafes and restaurants, as well as other locations in the US and Canada. They generally buy their beans directly from growers in Central America, South America, East Africa, and Ethiopia. Their roasting facility is in Chicago with a 300 kilogram capacity Probat R1500R roaster alongside two Gothot roasters with a capacity of 90 and 23 kilograms respectively.

On August 17, 2007, Intelligentsia opened its first store outside of Chicago at Sunset Junction in Silver Lake, a district east of Hollywood in Los Angeles, California. Intelligentsia has opened two additional stores in the Los Angeles area, in Venice and Pasadena. In 2013, Intelligentsia opened its first store in New York City inside The High Line Hotel. The second New York City location opened in June 2014, inside the Urban Outfitters store in Herald Square. This is the first location to offer a full food menu. They also have 2 stores in Boston and one in Austin, Texas. A 2008 decision to stop serving 20-ounce coffee and espresso beverages in stores was met with controversy. Zell stated that the proportions are altered at such large quantities and certain drinks become watered-down, arguing that 20-ounce drinks end up "masking and adulterating the pure, intense flavors we work hard to source, roast and produce. We don't want this to just be a caffeine delivery device."

In 2009 Intelligentsia acquired Ecco Caffè of Santa Rosa, California, and has retained the brand.

In October 2015, it was announced that Peet's Coffee & Tea would buy a majority stake in Intelligentsia Coffee & Tea by the end of the year, as part of an expansion of Peet's into third wave coffee that also involved the acquisition of Stumptown Coffee Roasters. Intelligentsia was expected to continue operating independently, with founders Zell and Mange retaining a role in the company. The announcement came weeks after Intelligentsia had made known that it was seeking a private equity buy-out over $100 million.

In May 2022 employees working in Intelligentsia's Chicago locations and Roasting Works warehouse filed a petition for union representation. In August 2022, employees voted to unionize, and ratified their first collective bargaining agreement in December 2022. They are represented by IBEW 1220, the same branch of IBEW that represents Colectivo Coffee Roasters.

== Honors ==
In 2006, Intelligentsia was included on several local and national best-of lists. One of their baristas also won national and international honors.

It has been winning local best of list recognition from 2000 to 2005. In 2005, the local recognition extended to national recognition. In 2006, Intelligentsia was included on several local and national "best" lists.

== See also ==
- Blue Bottle Coffee
- Counter Culture Coffee
- La Colombe Coffee Roasters
- Revelator Coffee
- Stumptown Coffee Roasters
- List of coffeehouse chains
- List of coffee companies
- Third-wave coffee in the United States
