= Counter Culture Coffee =

American coffee roasting company

- Industry: Retail coffee
- Founded: 1995; 31 years ago
- Headquarters: Durham, North Carolina
- Key people: Fred Houk (Founder), Brett Smith, (Founder and President), Joseph Prewett (CEO)
- Products: Coffee beans, Coffee drinks, Educational programs
- Website: counterculturecoffee.com

Counter Culture Coffee is a Durham, North Carolina–based coffee roasting company founded in 1995. It has regional training locations in Asheville, North Carolina; Atlanta; Boston; Charleston, South Carolina; Chicago; Dallas; Durham, North Carolina; Emeryville, California; Los Angeles; Miami; New York City; and Washington, D.C. Counter Culture training centers provide education in the fundamentals of preparing and serving coffee and serve as classrooms and event spaces. Training centers are not only for vendors of Counter Culture Coffee but are also available to anyone interested in coffee production. Training centers also host competition training, food events with guest chefs, and professional workshops.

Counter Culture Coffee buys primarily from small coffee producers at prices between $1.30 and $25 a pound. As such, they are regarded as a "boutique" coffee roaster, a company which sources from multiple small estates and cooperatives rather than a single large grower.

== Company history ==
Counter Culture Coffee started roasting coffee in Durham in 1995. Founded by Brett Smith and Fred Houk, their focus was creating custom coffee blends for some of Durham and Chapel Hill's southern restaurants. They sold their first coffee to Pop's Restaurant in Durham in 1995. The company expanded its operations to areas along the East Coast. The firm also diversified its line of products and services, offering seasonal coffee selections and educational programs that focus on sustainability and the coffee brewing process.

== Sustainability ==
Counter Culture Coffee directly collaborates with artisans who grow the coffee, and their partnership with farmers is a basis for their sustainable coffee model, which involves working with progressive and environmentally sensitive farms in the trade. In 2008, they launched a third-party Counter Culture Direct Trade Certification, establishing direct trade standards for sustainability, quality, and fairness in the coffee chain. Additional initiatives include their Sustaining Educational and Environmental Development at a Source (SEEDS) program and the company's Sustainability Scorecard. The SEEDS initiative aims to support sustainability and education on the origins of the products. At the same time, the Sustainability Scorecard measures the impact of the company's efforts toward building a more sustainable supply chain.

== Education ==
The firm also provides consumers, employees, and wholesale partners with educational programs on coffee brewing, origin, and history. Professional development courses include Brewing Science, Barista Fundamentals, Coffee Origins, Cupping Fundamentals, and Brewing: Technique & Troubleshooting.
Public educational initiatives include free "Tastings at Ten" every Friday morning, as well as homebrew labs for coffee enthusiasts offered at a fee. Educational courses are offered at twelve Counter Culture Training Centers across the country.

== Locations ==
Coffee is roasted in two production facilities in Durham, North Carolina (also the company's headquarters) and Emeryville, California.

== See also ==
- Blue Bottle Coffee
- Intelligentsia Coffee & Tea
- La Colombe Coffee Roasters
- Revelator Coffee
- Stumptown Coffee Roasters
- List of coffeehouse chains
- List of coffee companies
