= Alterra =

Alterra may refer to:

- Alterra Power, a Canadian energy company
- Alterra Coffee Roasters, a private label of Lavazza's Flavia Beverage Systems single-serve coffee container business
- Alterra Mountain Company, a North American ski resort operator
- Alterra Corporation, a fictional corporation in the game Subnautica
- Colectivo Coffee Roasters, an American café chain that was formerly known as Alterra Coffee Roasters
