= Intelligentsia (disambiguation) =

Intelligentsia is a social class composed of the intellectual elite of a society.

Intelligentsia or Intelligencia may also refer to:

- Intelligentsia Coffee, an American coffee roasting company
- Intelligencia (comics), a Marvel Comics group
  - Intelligencia (Marvel Cinematic Universe), a version of the group appearing in the Marvel Cinematic Universe
