= Walter Koch =

Walter Koch may refer to:

- Walter Koch (astrologer) (1895–1970), German astrologer
- Walter Koch (paratrooper) (1910–1943), German World War II paratrooper
- Walter Koch (physician) (1880–1962), German physician
- Walter J. Koch (born 1961), American scientist
- Walter Koch (politician), Saxon and German diplomat, lawyer and politician
- Walter Koch (1911–1998), business owner of Machwitz Kaffee
