= Caffé Vita Coffee Roasting Company =

Coffee roasting company in Seattle, Washington

Coordinates: 47.614004°N 122.31902°W

Caffe Vita Coffee Roasting
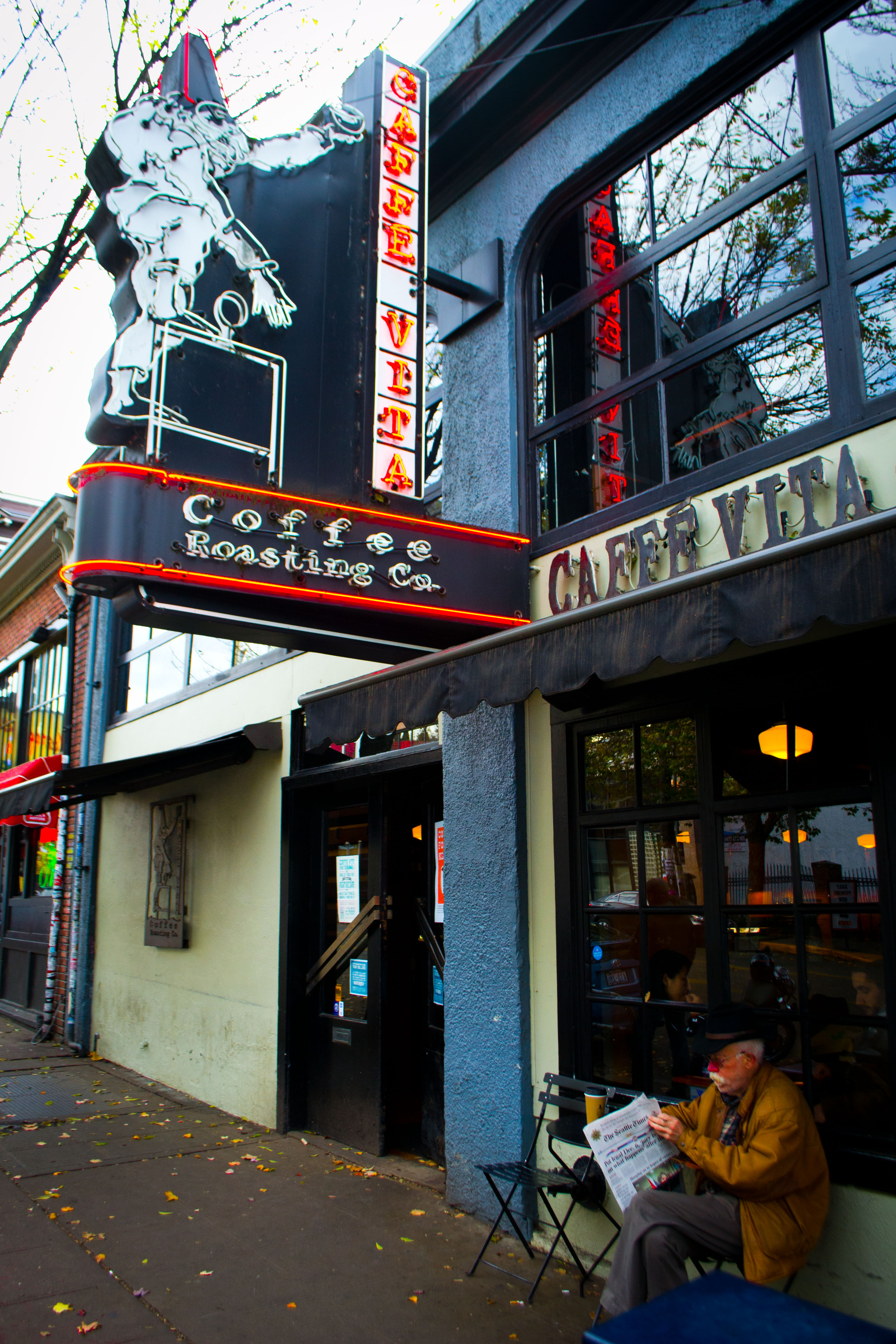
- Caffe Vita in Seattle's Capitol Hill neighborhood
- Type: Private
- Industry: Restaurants
- Founded: 1995
- Headquarters: Seattle, Washington, U.S.
- Key people: Deming Maclise
- Products: Coffee, tea
- Number of employees: 100
- Website: www.caffevita.com

Caffe Vita Coffee Roasting Company, commonly known as Caffe Vita, is an American coffee roasting company based in Seattle, Washington. Part of the third wave of coffee movement, it has been named one of 10 places offering "the best coffee in America."

Caffe Vita was founded in Seattle's Queen Anne neighborhood in 1995 by Mike McConnell. McConnell was an early proponent of developing direct relationships with coffee farmers and bypassing the fair trade of coffee, thus pioneering the Farm Direct movement.

On January 1, 2020, local restaurateur Deming Maclise took over ownership at Caffe Vita.

== Locations ==
Caffe Vita's location at 1005 East Pike Street in Seattle houses their flagship café, roastery, and company offices. The company operates seven other cafés around the city; there is another roastery in Phoenix, Arizona. In March 2012, Caffe Vita opened a café on the Lower East Side of Manhattan. The company expanded its New York presence in 2015 with the opening of a roastery and café in Bushwick, Brooklyn. There are a total of 10 locations nationwide; Caffe Vita also supplies coffee to other cafés, restaurants, and hotels.

== Community involvement ==
=== Training and opportunity programs ===
In 2009, Caffe Vita partnered with Portland's p:ear, a homeless youth mentoring program, to create the p:ear Barista School. Caffe Vita provides equipment, coffee beans, milk, and training that allow the school to take homeless youth through an 8-week program that give them the necessary skills and experience to get a job as a barista.

Caffe Vita currently supports FareStart's youth barista training program, which trains homeless youth and provides barista jobs at their coffee stands in T-Mobile Field. They also sponsor FareStart's annual Guest Chef Night and Volunteer Server Night, which annually bring together Seattle chefs and winemakers to raise money for FareStart.

=== Fundraising and sponsorships ===
Caffe Vita sponsors several local events, including Timber Music Fest, by Artist Home, Thing Festival and Capitol Hill Block Party.

In 2009, Caffe Vita underwrote and organized "GIVE Seattle": a 36-track compilation record, featuring artists such as Ben Gibbard and Fleet Foxes to benefit four local food banks and arts organizations.

Every year, Caffe Vita hosts a holiday fundraising drive for organizations like Community Passageways and Trans Lifeline in all Caffe Vita cafes, with donations matched dollar for dollar.

Under leadership of new owner Deming Maclise, Caffe Vita started a line of Coffees for a Cause, donating $2 from every bag sold to non-profits like Seattle Foundation, Lambert House, FareStart, and more.

=== Business Partnerships ===
Caffe Vita partners with Easy Street Records, after whom it named its Easy Street Indo 30 coffee blend. The store's founder, Matt Vaughan, was Caffe Vita's first wholesale customer in 1995.

In 2017, all Washington State Ferries began serving Caffe Vita coffee, and in 2019 the company began barrel-aging its coffee in partnership with Batch 206 Distillery. Three barrel-aged coffees have been released to date - with bourbon, rum, and gin.

== Sustainability ==
Caffe Vita is a pioneer of the Farm Direct movement, meticulously sourcing coffee while developing long-term relationships with growers in more than 11 countries. The chain has served numerous Organic, Farm Direct, and Rainforest Alliance Certified coffees.

In 2009, Caffe Vita began collaborating with Woodland Park Zoo's Tree Kangaroo Project to develop the first-ever coffee from Papua New Guinea's Yopno Uruwa Som region made commercially available in the U.S., purchased directly from growers. The coffee was sold at all Seattle Caffe Vita locations and at Woodland Park Zoo ZooStores. A Zoo Special Reserve coffee was also offered, with a dollar from each purchased bag being donated to the Woodland Park Zoo.

== Change in Ownership ==
Local restaurateur Deming Maclise — who had a minority stake in the company before — assumed control of the Caffe Vita company on January 1, 2020. Addressing a previous controversy over the McConnells' position on giving unsold food to the homeless, he emphasized that the company should "have a general welcoming policy to everyone." Maclise also indicated that the deal was unrelated to the controversy, having been in negotiation for about a year and a half. He suggested that the Caffe might change its food menus over time and seek more local businesses collaborations, both of which might involve his other restaurant properties.

== See also ==
- Coffee in Seattle
- List of coffee companies
