= Dreamfarm =

Australian design company

- Type: Brand
- Industry: Kitchenwares and Housewares
- Founded: 2003
- Founder: Alexander Gransbury
- Headquarters: Brisbane, Australia
- Number of locations: 2 Offices
- Number of employees: 15
- Parent: The Dream Farm Pty Ltd
- Subsidiaries: Dreamfarm Australia Pty Ltd, Dreamfarm Inc
- Website: Dreamfarm

Dreamfarm (The Dream Farm Pty Ltd) is a design company headquartered in Brisbane, Australia. Founded in Australian Capital Canberra in 2003, Dreamfarm's range includes innovative kitchenwares and homewares, with potato masher Smood the best-selling product.

The company won its first Red Dot Design Award in March 2010 for "Clongs", click-lock sit up tongs, a design which includes resting points so that the working end of tongs does not come into contact with a bench surface.

== History ==
Dreamfarm was founded in 2003 by the then 22-year-old Alexander Gransbury. The company's first product was the coffee grind knockbox, Grindenstein. Feeling frustrated with no easy way to dispose of the used coffee grinds from his home espresso machine, Gransbury built the first ever Grindenstein prototype out of a PVC pipe and a construction bolt. Within twelve months, Grindenstein – now made out of ABS plastic and Santoprene rubber – was being sold in selected retail stores around Australia, while still being built at Gransbury's family residence in Canberra. By the end of 2005, Grindenstein was being sold nationally and internationally.

Dreamfarm's production was moved offshore in 2006, so the company could continue to meet the increasingly high demand and provide products of an optimum quality. From there it was able to concentrate on designing and producing more products and extending the range.

Dreamfarm Europe BV was launched to sell directly to European retailers in June, 2006. Due to the fall of the Euro against the US dollar and increasing costs of freight and holding stock in The Netherlands, Dreamfarm Europe BV was closed in June, 2017.

In 2007, Dreamfarm secured distribution agencies in Canada, the US and New Zealand.

As the company continued to expand, the need to be based in a larger city became apparent. It relocated its headquarters to Brisbane, Queensland, in January 2008. To sell directly to the expanding USA market, Dreamfarm Inc was established as wholly owned distributor in May 2008 and Dreamfarm Australia Pty Ltd followed in 2013. Both subsidiaries run their own local warehouses to service retail stores and internet consumers. Their local sales and support staff manage teams of external sales representatives who call on over 1200 and 400 retail stores in the US and Australia respectively.

Dreamfarm is currently distributed in 23 countries worldwide, including France, Norway, Switzerland, Japan, Israel, Denmark, Ireland, the Philippines, South Africa and the United Kingdom. The UK is Dreamfarm's largest market (outside of Australia and the United States).

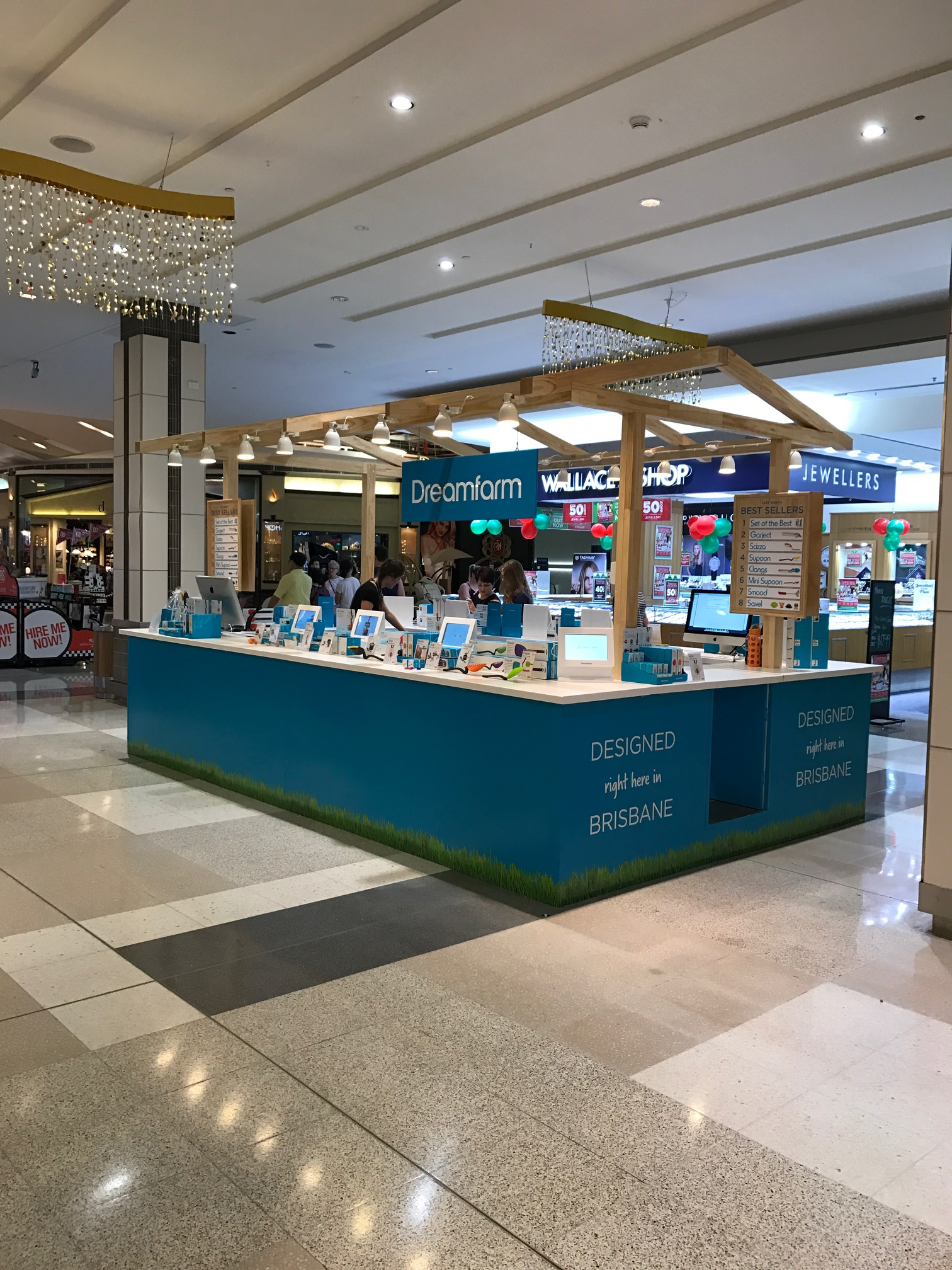
Dreamfarm pop-up shop at Westfield Chermside shopping mall December, 2017.

== Products ==
The following is a list of Dreamfarm products, the year they were introduced and a brief description:

Year	Product	Description	Design Awards
2003	Grindenstein	Coffee grind knockbox and recycling station	
2007	Scizza	Flat-based scissor for cutting pizza, pastry and fabric and protecting the cutting surface	
2008	Smood	Spring-based potato masher	
2008	Gripet	Mountable note holder	
2009	Vebo	Silicone vegetable steamer and boiler	
2009	Jot	Suction-cap hook	
2009	Spink	Beverage spill-saver	
2009	Oni	Spreading, cutting and slicing all-in-one sandwich knife	
2010	Clongs	Button-lock tongs that sit up off the bench	Red Dot Design Award 2010
2010	Supoon	Scraping cooking spoon that sits up off the bench	Gourmet Gold Best in Show 2018
2010	Teafu	Silicone pump-action tea infuser	
2010	Chobs	Chopping board attachments that lift the board up and let you chop on both sides	
2010	Chopula	Chopping, scraping spatula that sits up off the bench	Best of the Best Red Dot Design Award 2011
2010	Tapi	Tap attachment that converts a tap into a drink fountain	Red Dot Design Award 2011
2011	Membo	Mountable 7-day job reminder	
2011	BBQ Clongs	Button-lock tongs that sit up off the bench, with barbecue-friendly tips	
2011	Garject	Self-cleaning garlic press	iF Award 2012, Australian International Design Award (Best in Category) 2012, Good Design Award 2012
2011	Temji	Shower temperature dials	
2012	Stainless Steel Chopula	Sit up chopping spatula made from stainless steel	
2012	Mini Supoon	Jar scraping spoon that sits up off the bench	gia Finalist 2013, Gourmet Catalog Most Innovative Product 2020
2013	Garject Lite	Nylon version of award-winning self-cleaning Garject garlic press	
2013	Onpot	Pot lid rest	gia Finalist 2014
2014	Savel	Flexible food saver	gia Finalist 2015
2015	Levoons	Set of four self-levelling measuring spoons	Good Design Award 2015
2015	Levups	Set of four self-levelling measuring cups	
2016	Spadle	Serving spoon that turns into a ladle	
2016	Holey Spadle	Slotted spoon that turns into a slotted ladle	
2016	Set of the Best	Essential hand tool gift set. Includes Spadle, Holey Spadle, Chopula, Supoon and Mini Supoon	
2017	Spindry	Spin dry toilet brush	gia Finalist 2018, Good Design Gold Award 2018
2017	Fledge	Flip up edge cutting board	gia Winner 2018, Good Design Gold Award 2018
2017	Levoop	Adjustable volume, self-levelling scoop	Red Dot Design Award 2018
2018	Bamboo Fledge	Tri-ply, dishwasher safe Bamboo flip up edge cutting board	
2019	Ortwo	One handed or two pepper grinder	Red Dot Design Award 2019, Good Design Gold Award 2019, gia Winner 2019, Gourmet Catalog Most Innovative Product 2020
2019	Ortwo Lite	Nylon version of award-winning one handed or two pepper grinder	
2020	Orlid	Stackable spice jar with a double lid that opens to shake or scoop with the press of a button	Red Dot Design Award 2020, Good Design Gold Award 2020
2020	Spina	Colander that turns into an in-sink salad spinner	Good Design Best in Category Award 2020
2020	Kneed	Never-rust, spreading knife	
2020	Knibble	Non-stick cheese knife with built in fork for nibbles and beechwood handle	
2020	Knibble Lite	Non-stick cheese knife with built in fork for nibbles and plastic handle	
2024	Ozest	Concave speed zester that instantly cleans itself with the push of a button.	Kitchen Hand Tools + Cutlery Award by the Global Honorees of the IHA Global Innovation Awards (gia) for Excellence in Product Design
