= Per'La Specialty Roasters =

American specialty coffee roaster

Per'La Specialty Roasters is an American coffee roasting company based in Miami, Florida. It was founded in 2015 by Chris Nolte and Paul Massard, both graduates of the University of Miami. The company operates under a roast-to-order model and supplies roasted coffee to cafés, restaurants, hotels, offices, and retail outlets in the United States and internationally.

== History ==
Per'La Specialty Roasters was founded in 2015 in Coral Gables, Florida, by Chris Nolte and Paul Massard, both alumni of the University of Miami. The founders established the company with the intention of implementing a roast-to-order approach, in which coffee is roasted shortly before distribution.

In September 2021, the company expanded internationally by opening a roastery in Newbury, England, to serve the European market.

== Operations ==
The company provides roasted coffee to hospitality businesses and operates a direct-to-consumer e-commerce platform. It also develops private-label coffee programs and offers training and equipment support for wholesale clients. They partnered with The Setai Miami Beach in 2016 to create the hotel's first Setai House Blend. In 2017, Per'La was roasting approximately 900 pounds of coffee beans every week.

== Products ==
Per'La primarily sources Arabica coffee beans from Central and South America, Africa, and Asia. Its product range includes single-origin coffees, limited-edition blends, and seasonal offerings.

== Recognition ==
In 2018, Per'La Specialty Roasters received a Good Food Award from the Good Food Foundation and the Coffee Quality Institute.

In 2021, Coral Gables Magazine featured the company's growth and roasting practices, and Daily Coffee News reported on its expansion to the United Kingdom.

In 2022, Per'La was named a finalist for the Good Food Awards with its Ethiopia Bombe coffee.

In 2024, the University of Miami published a profile of the founders as part of its alumni success stories.

== See also ==
- List of coffee companies
