= 7 Brew =

American drive-thru coffeehouse chain

7 Brew Coffee

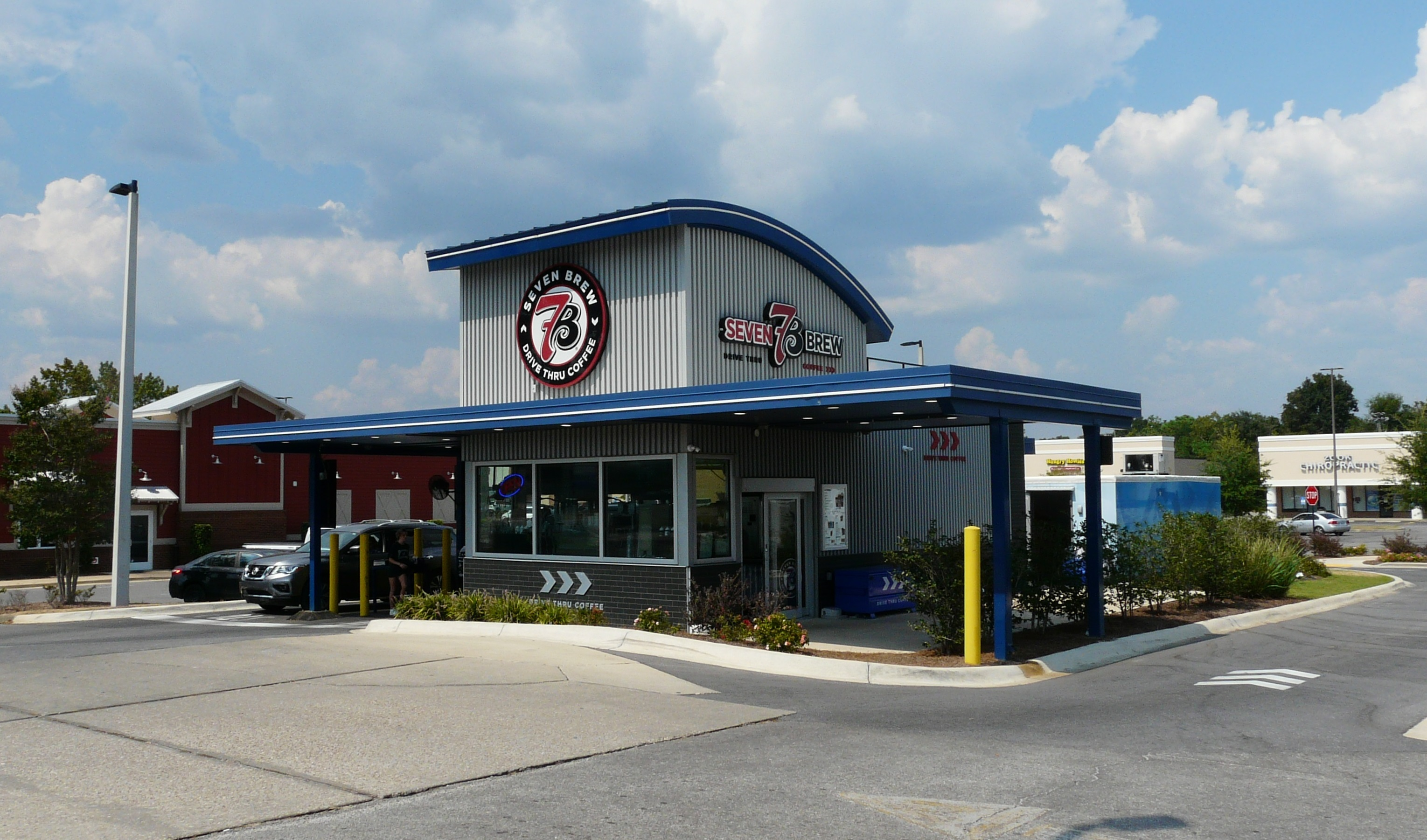
- A 7 Brew coffeehouse in Niceville, Florida
- Industry: Restaurant
- Genre: Coffeehouse
- Founded: 2017, 8 years ago in Rogers, Arkansas
- Headquarters: Springdale, Arkansas
- Number of locations: 901 (2026)
- Area served: United States
- Products: Coffee; energy drinks; sparkling water; lemonade; tea; smoothies; milkshakes
- Website: 7brew.com

7 Brew Coffee is an American chain of drive-thru only coffeehouses. It was founded in Rogers, Arkansas, in 2017, but has since expanded and now has a presence throughout the United States. The company's name is derived from its original menu including 7 different coffee drinks, but this number has since expanded.

As of June, 2026, 7 Brew has more than 750 locations nationwide, with each location having an average unit volume of approximately $2 million. The company's president is Chris Dawson, and its CEO is John Davidson as of February 2024.

== History ==
7 Brew was created in 2017, with its first location opening in Rogers, Arkansas.

In 2023, Motley 7 Brew established as a franchise and expanded to over 20 locations by October 2025, supported by investments from private equity groups.

In 2024, the American alternative investment company Blackstone Inc. made a growth equity investment in 7 Brew that allowed it to expand, though it still had about 190 locations nationwide before this point. 7 Brew opened 141 locations throughout 2024 and had a sales increase by 162% to $502 million, ending the year with 321 locations.

In September 2025, the private investment firm Franchise Equity Firms acquired 7 Crew, 7 Brew's second largest franchisee, which is expected to increase its size by over 200 locations. Taco Bell, Jersey Mike's, and Walmart also started business relations with the company in 2025. On September 24, 2025, 7 Brew announced that it would be partnering with American channel Dude Perfect, with plans for appearances in their content as well as a Dude Perfect-themed beverage underway. It opened its 500th location in Toms River, New Jersey, in October 2025. By 2026, 7 Brew has grown to more than 700 locations across 38 states.

On June 15th, 2026, they celebrated the opening of their 777th location.

On August 12, 2026, 7 Brew Coffee launched its mobile ordering app.

== See also ==
- List of coffee companies
