= Dulce Café =

South African café chain

Coordinates: 33.980°S 25.560°E

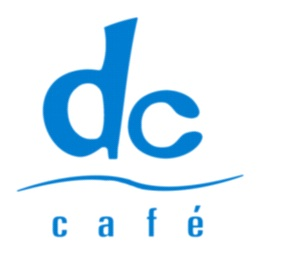
- Type: Private Company
- Industry: Restaurant, Franchising
- Founded: Port Elizabeth, South Africa (1980)
- Headquarters: Port Elizabeth, South Africa
- Number of locations: 53
- Key people: Mike Pullen, Managing Director

Dulce Café is the name of a coffee shop/restaurant chain operating in South Africa. Originating in the city of Port Elizabeth, the company started as one small ice cream shop in 1980 and has now grown to 53 stores throughout the country.

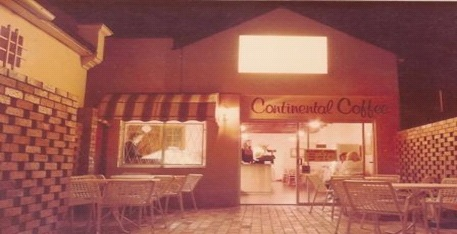
The first Dulce Cafe

== History ==
Hubert Stempowski founded Dulce Café, at its height, employed over 110 people throughout the Eastern Cape. Dulce Ice Cream opened for business in July 1981 in a small complex in Sydenham, Port Elizabeth.

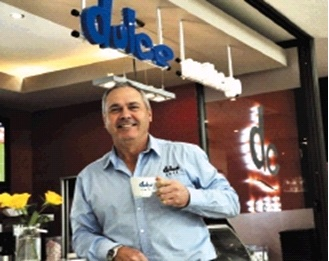
Mike Pullen

In 2001, a management buyout was led by Mike Pullen, who became the majority shareholder of the company. The brand began to target niche markets such as hospital stores.

In early 2013, Pullen sold out his majority shareholding in Dulcé Café SA (to focus on the international market) to Kobus Wiese of Wiese Coffee Holdings.

In 2011, agreements were signed to expand the brand into East Africa, West Africa and the MENA territories. In Oct 2015, a master franchise agreement was signed for India.

Country	Date	First outlet location	Number of currently operating outlets
South Africa	12 July 1981	Port Elizabeth, Eastern Cape	53
Namibia	15 May 2007	Windhoek	1
Tanzania	5 December 2011	Dar es Salaam	1
Ghana	April 2011	Accra	1
Zambia	April 2011	Lusaka	1
Saudi Arabia	May 2011	Riyadh	1
India	January 2016		1
