= Landwer Coffee =

Israeli coffee roaster and café chain

Landwer Coffee Ltd.
- Company type: Private
- Industry: Beverages; Restaurant
- Founded: 1919; 107 years ago
- Founder: Moshe Landwer
- Headquarters: Holon, Israel
- Area served: Israel
- Products: Coffee
- Owner: Federman & Sons (Holdings) Ltd.
- Website: www.landwer.com

Landwer Coffee (Hebrew: קפה לנדוור) is the first coffee roaster company opened in Israel and the second largest in the country. It was originally established in 1919 in Germany. The company also owns the Cafe Landwer restaurant chain.

== History ==
Landwer Coffee was established by Moshe Landwer in 1919 in Berlin, Germany. The family operated a small coffee bar and a coffee roasting facility. In 1933, when the Nazis came to power in Germany, the family decided to immigrate to Tel Aviv. Immediately after their arrival, the Landwer family opened their first coffee roasting facility in Allenby Street, making it the first coffee roaster company in the country. Later, when the business expanded, the family moved the coffee bar to 121 Allenby Street.

In 1964, the roasting facility was moved to the industrial area in Holon, Israel, in a hangar covering 1,000 square metres (11,000 sq ft). In the early 1980s, the Federman family acquired Landwer Coffee from Shmuel Landwer, the son of Moshe Landwer. Today, under the ownership of Federman & Sons (Holdings) Ltd., Landwer Coffee produces and distributes Turkish and espresso coffee. It is the second-largest coffee roaster in Israel.

== Cafe Landwer ==
In 2004, the company developed the Cafe Landwer chain of franchise casual restaurants, which grew by 2018 to 60 locations in Israel. It opened its first North American locations in 2017 (in Toronto) and 2018 (the Audubon Circle area of Boston, Massachusetts).

As of 2024, there are twelve locations across the U.S. and Canada: Toronto (6); Boston (3); Maple, Ontario; Los Angeles; and Miami].
