= Used coffee grounds =

Waste product from brewing coffee

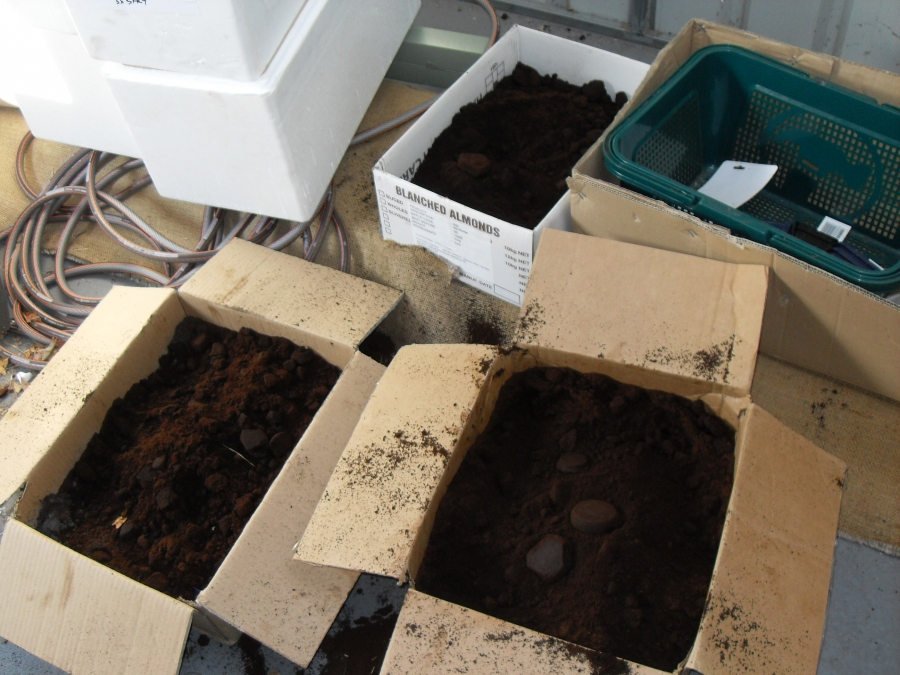
- Used coffee grounds in boxes
- Usage: Waste; Composting; Food; Fortune telling; Fungiculture

Used coffee grounds are the result of brewing coffee and are the final product after preparation of coffee. Despite having several highly-desirable chemical components, used coffee grounds are generally regarded as waste, and they are usually thrown away or composted. As of 2019, it was estimated that over 15 million tonnes of spent coffee grounds were generated annually. With this quantity of waste and the chemical properties of used coffee grounds, they have several potential uses.

== Chemical composition ==
Most used coffee grounds are similar in chemical composition, although coffee grounds used to make instant coffee have fewer chemicals in them due to a more extensive extraction process. Used coffee grounds are rich in sugars, which make up about half of their weight. About 20% is proteins, about 15% lipids (fats) and 20% is lignins. The dry coffee grounds contain significant amounts of potassium (11.7 g/kg), nitrogen (27.9 g/kg), magnesium (1.9 g/kg), and phosphorus (1.8 g/kg). The quantity of caffeine remaining in used coffee grounds is around 48% of that in fresh coffee grounds. There are significantly less tannins in used coffee grounds than fresh coffee grounds.

== Production ==
On average, 1 tonne of green coffee produces approximately 650 kg of spent coffee grounds, and over 15 million tonnes of spent coffee grounds are generated annually. In keeping with a life cycle approach to sustainability, this large quantity of waste requires waste management plans. Due to the amount of spent coffee grounds generated and the chemical properties of spent coffee grounds, the usage of spent coffee grounds is avidly investigated.

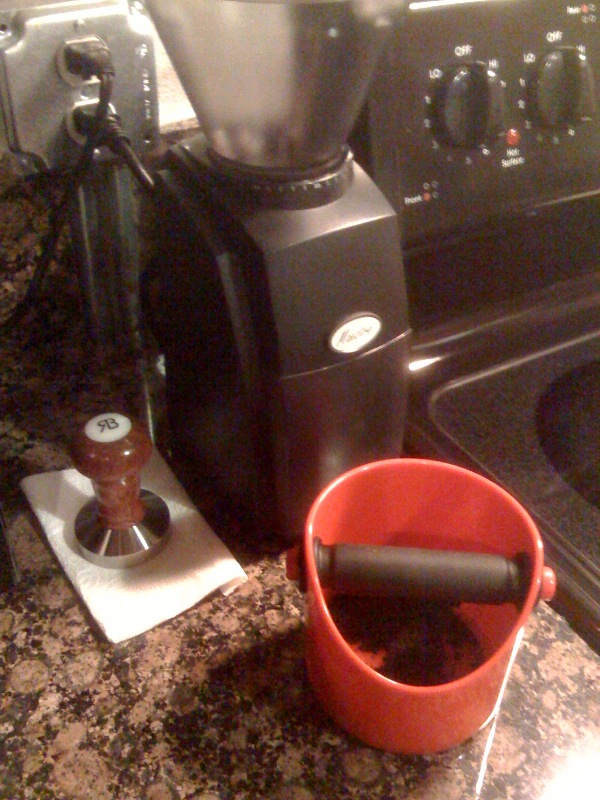
An espresso tamper, grinder, and knockbox

A knockbox (informally known as a "bash bin", "coffee column", "slam piece" or "bang bang") is a device used to store spent espresso grounds, called a puck, after a shot of espresso has been pulled. It is generally made of stainless steel, rubber, or plastic and has a sturdy bar known as a "bash bar", against which a portafilter is tapped to release the puck. Because the espresso puck is typically very hot after extraction, knockboxes need to be sturdy. Further, they are also subject to repetitive knocking and tapping to dislodge espresso after use, and thus rubber and stainless steel are the most commonly used materials. In various coffeehouses there are drawers which are integral within the bar structure, or a stainless steel box is located near the grinder for convenience.

== Usage ==
A 2026 review examined the chemical composition and functional properties of spent coffee grounds and surveyed their valorization as food additives, agricultural amendments, adsorbent materials for wastewater treatment, feedstock for biofuel production, and as ingredients in pharmaceutical, nutraceutical, biotechnological, cosmetic, personal‑care, and sustainable material applications, including biorefining.

=== Precautions ===
It is not recommended to burn dried used coffee grounds, as they give off hazardous nitrogen oxides when burnt..

=== Gardening ===
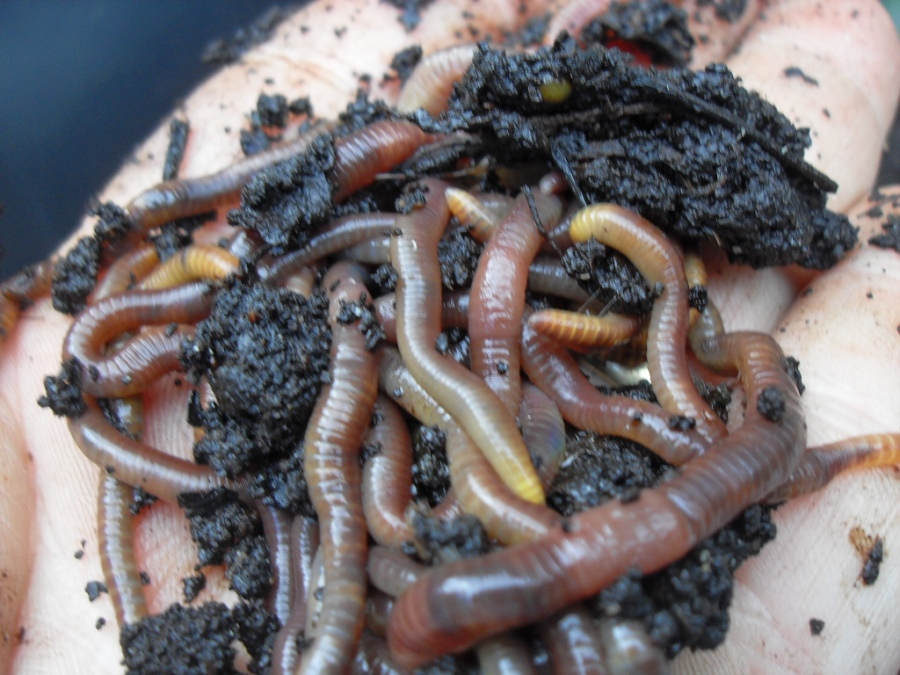
Composting worms moving about in used coffee grounds

In gardens, coffee grounds may be used for composting or as a mulch as they are known to slowly release nitrogen into the soil. They are said to be especially appreciated by worms and acid-loving plants, such as blueberries, although the acids leached from the grounds typically have a neutral pH, and red wiggler growth and survival has been experimentally tested and found to reduce the pH in treatments using used coffee grounds as the primary feedstock for the worms. Used coffee grounds are particularly noted as a soil amendment. Spent coffee grounds have phytotoxic properties which can be reduced through composting. Gardeners have reported the use of used coffee grounds as a borer, slug and snail repellent. Some commercial coffee shops run initiatives to prevent the grounds from going to waste, including Starbucks' "Grounds for your Garden" project, and community sponsored initiatives exist, such as "Ground to Ground" or the 'Green Coffee Shop Scheme' in Cambridgeshire.

=== Food ===
Coffee grounds have been used in Finland and Karelia to make pancakes by adding them to the pancake batter. Grounds are stored safely for a short time before being used. The grounds contain about half of the original caffeine and must be eaten in moderation.

=== Fortune telling ===
In divination and fortune-telling, the patterns of coffee grounds are used for predictions.

=== In the home ===
Dried used coffee grounds were recommended to fill pincushions. Used coffee grounds have other homemade uses in wood staining, air fresheners, and body soap scrubs.

=== Agricultural uses ===
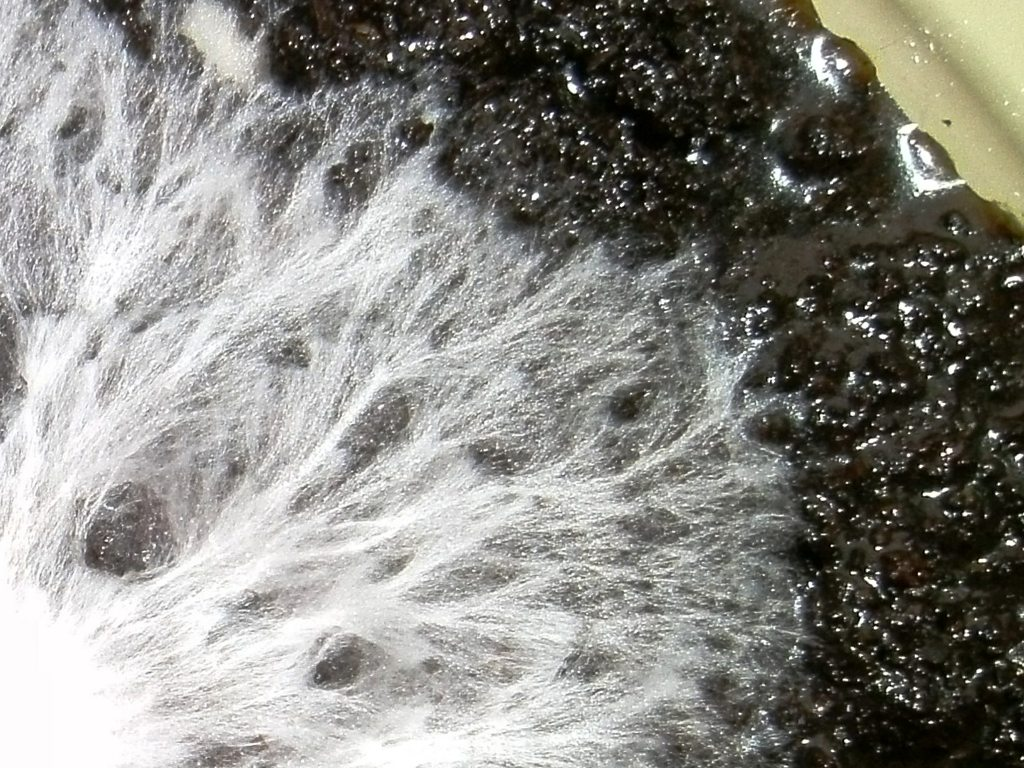
Oyster mushroom mycelium on coffee grounds

Initiatives have succeeded using coffee grounds as a substrate for the cultivation of mushrooms (including oyster mushrooms). The use of spent coffee grounds in this application has the advantage of the used coffee grounds needing no pre-treatment to be usable as a mushroom substrate.

Application of 10 kg used coffee grounds per square metre has been suggested as part of a crop rotation system, where for the first six months, the field is allowed to lie fallow with a layer of coffee grounds on it suppressing weed growth, then the coffee grounds are plowed in and legumes are grown, which fix their own nitrogen. Application of an equal amount of horse manure at the same time as the coffee grounds has been shown to nearly eliminate negative effects of fresh used coffee grounds.

It has been proposed to use spent coffee grounds to feed ruminants, pigs, chickens and rabbits, but the high lignin content makes this an undesirable use.

=== Industrial uses ===
Coffee grounds may be used industrially in biogas production or to treat wastewater. Bioethanol may also be produced from the sugar content of spent coffee grounds, after it is defatted as a pre-treatment, it is typically hydrolysed by dilute acid.

Biodiesel may be produced from coffee grounds, either directly by extracting the oils using solvents, by mixing the grounds with methane and a catalyst, or by using the grounds to feed bio-producing algae. Used coffee grounds have also been investigated as an energy source through hydrothermal liquefaction, producing a char with very high energy content.

In concrete making, 10-15% of the sand used may be replaced with used coffee grounds. A 2025 life cycle assessment found that incorporating biochar derived from spent coffee grounds into concrete at replacement levels of 5–15% could reduce environmental impacts, with carbon dioxide emissions decreasing by up to 23.2% under the study's conditions. The environmental benefits diminished at replacement levels above 15%.

It has been suggested to recover caffeine from used coffee grounds for commercial applications in agrifood, cosmetic, nutraceutic or pharmaceutic industries.

In 2021, Gloucestershire-based football club Forest Green Rovers trialed a kit made from 35% used coffee grounds combined with recycled plastic.

=== Cafe uses ===
A method of safe disposal of coffee ground waste has been tested to assist with noise management in cafés. Using coffee waste and urea resin to create sound absorbing panels, the noise generated in cafés can be reduced while coffee waste is recycled. The coffee grounds are dried, mixed with the resin, then pressed and heated.

Different particle sizes of the coffee grounds were tested. The Coffee Waste Sound Absorption (CWSA) that had the highest sound absorption coefficient was observed at 0.4g/cm3 density. While the panels were applied to the ceiling of the café, they could reduce reverberation time from 1.2 s without sound absorbing material to 0.7 s with CWSA. The sound pressure level was reduced by 7 decibels.

=== Other ===
Used coffee grounds can be reused for hair care or skin care as well as in the garden as a compost and as biodiesel fuel.

== See also ==
- Ecological effects of coffee
- Sustainable coffee
