= Philz Coffee =

American coffee company and coffeehouse chain

- Industry: Coffee shop
- Founded: 2003; 23 years ago
- Founders: Phil Jaber; Jacob Jaber
- Headquarters: San Francisco
- Number of locations: 79
- Area served: United States
- Key people: Mahesh Sadarangani, CEO
- Products: Coffee, tea, mint mojito, hot chocolate, pastries
- Owner: Freeman Spogli & Co.
- Number of employees: 1,445 (2025)
- Website: philzcoffee.com

Philz Coffee is an American coffee company and coffeehouse chain based in San Francisco, California, which helped popularize third wave coffee. Philz Coffee focuses on making pour over coffee. Philz Coffee has locations spread throughout the San Francisco Bay Area, greater Los Angeles, San Diego, Sacramento, and Chicago. Philz was founded by Phil Jaber and his son Jacob, both of whom are located in the San Francisco area.

In addition to coffee and drinks, Philz also sells merchandise and bagged coffee blends for purchase online.

== History ==
Phil Jaber, born in Palestine, and his son Jacob founded Philz Coffee in 2003. Phil operated a corner grocery in San Francisco's Mission District for over 25 years and had strong ties to the community. Phil's son, Jacob Jaber, later assumed the role of CEO and built the company from a single store to nearly 70 locations across the United States. In 2021, Jacob and Phil stepped away from the day to day operations of the company.

Philz Coffee secured a round of funding in 2013 by Summit Partners and a few private investors to expand into new markets, leading to the first Philz Coffee outside the Bay Area in Santa Monica California. In February 2015 they secured a $15M Series B round to help them expand in the United States. In September 2016, they closed a $45M Series C round from San Francisco-based private equity firm TPG Growth to continue the expansion. In August 2025, Philz was acquired by private equity firm Freeman Spogli & Co. for $145 million.

== Locations ==
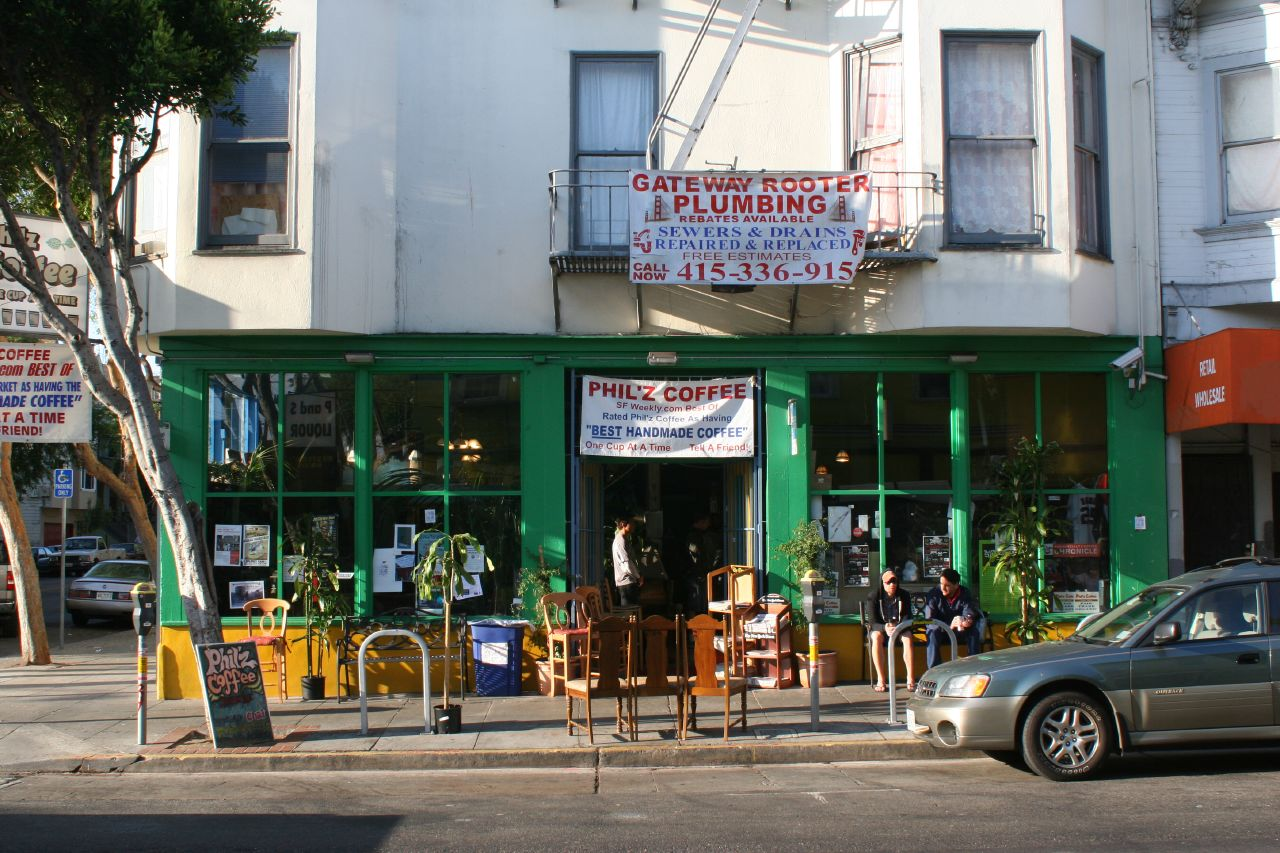
Original Philz Coffee Location in San Francisco, CA

From its origins in San Francisco, investor funding allowed Philz to expand its presence to include southern California, Chicago, and the District of Columbia, Maryland, and Virginia (DMV) area. However, in 2022, Philz began closing some of its retail locations. The first stores to close were located in the DMV area, and by the beginning of 2023 the company had exited the region, citing "business conditions". As of August 2025, Philz Coffee has 79 locations, entirely in California and Chicago.

In October 2023, the company also closed its original location in the Mission District of San Francisco. The store lead, Chris Watts, stated that the closure followed a decision not to renew the location's lease. However, the staff of the Mission location has stated that the building was in a state of disrepair and that the store needed to find a more modern location.

In January 2024, the company announced that it was moving its corporate headquarters to Oakland, CA from its original location in the Dogpatch neighborhood of San Francisco.

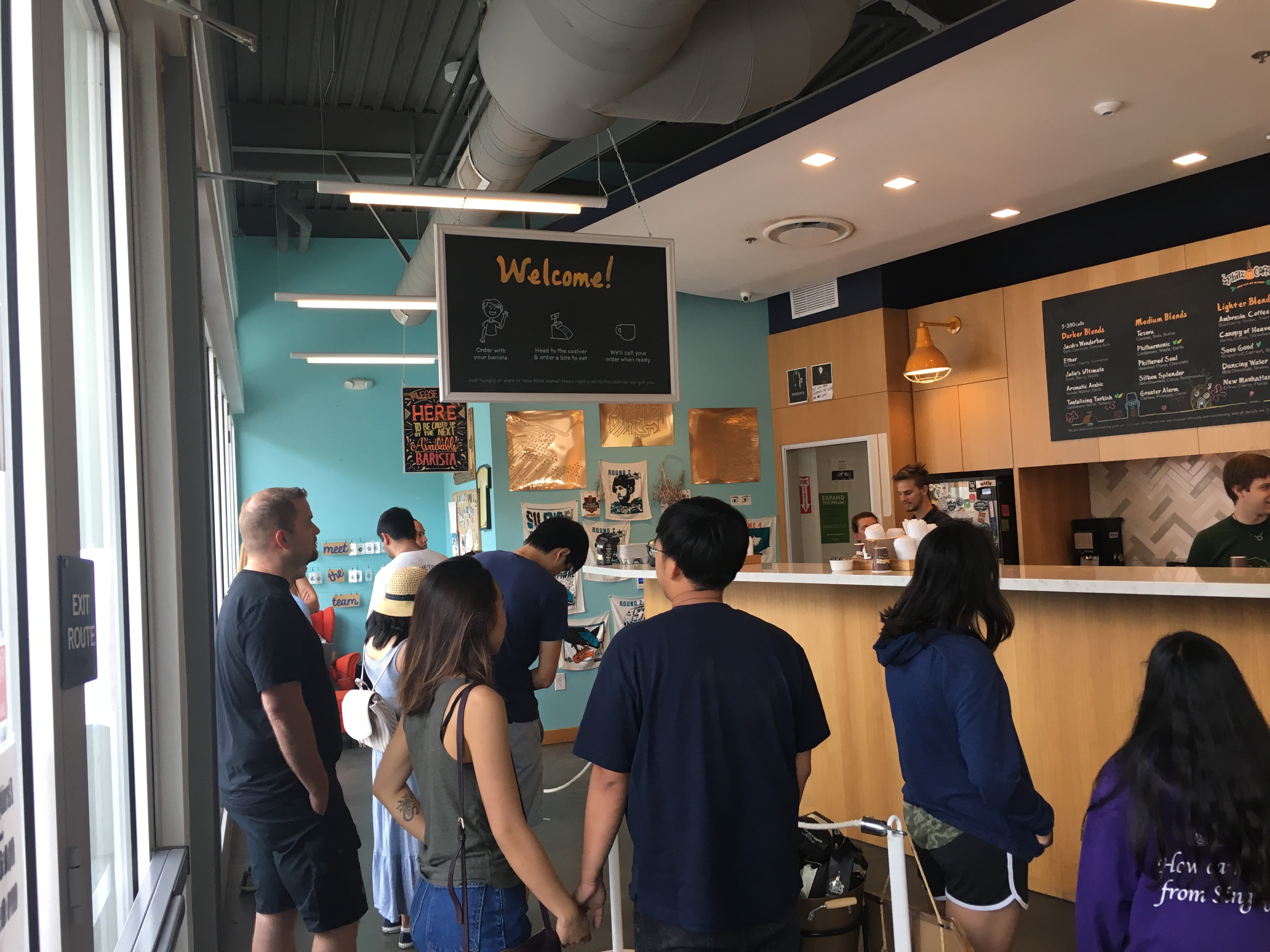
Philz Coffee Location in Cupertino, CA

== Products ==
=== Popular drinks ===
Philz Coffee’s menu is based around drip coffee, as they do not sell espresso.

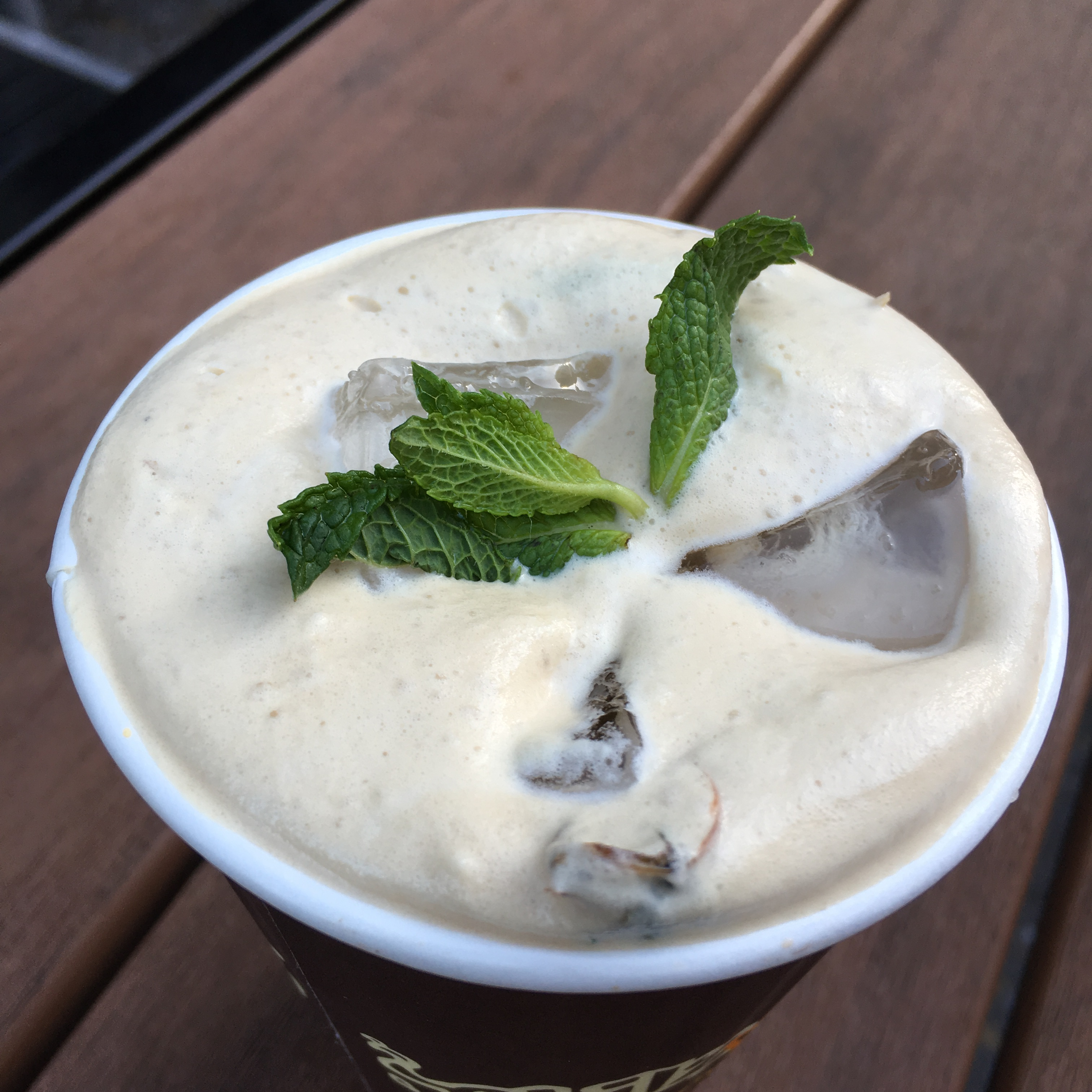
Iced Mint Mojito

The most popular drink at Philz Coffee is the Iced Mint Mojito. It contains a blend of coffee and freshly pressed mint leaves. According to the company’s current CEO, Mahesh Sadarangani, the drink accounts for about 30% of their orders.

Another popular drink is the Oatmeal Cookie Cold Brew, which was originally a "secret menu item". Local guides describe the coffee as a mix of hazelnut coffee, cinnamon, and oat milk.

Other popular drinks include the Iced Coffee Rose, which is a blend of coffee, rose water, and rose petals, and the Mocha Tesora, which contains a chocolate coffee, milk, and Ghiradelli cocoa powder.

=== Cream and sugar levels ===
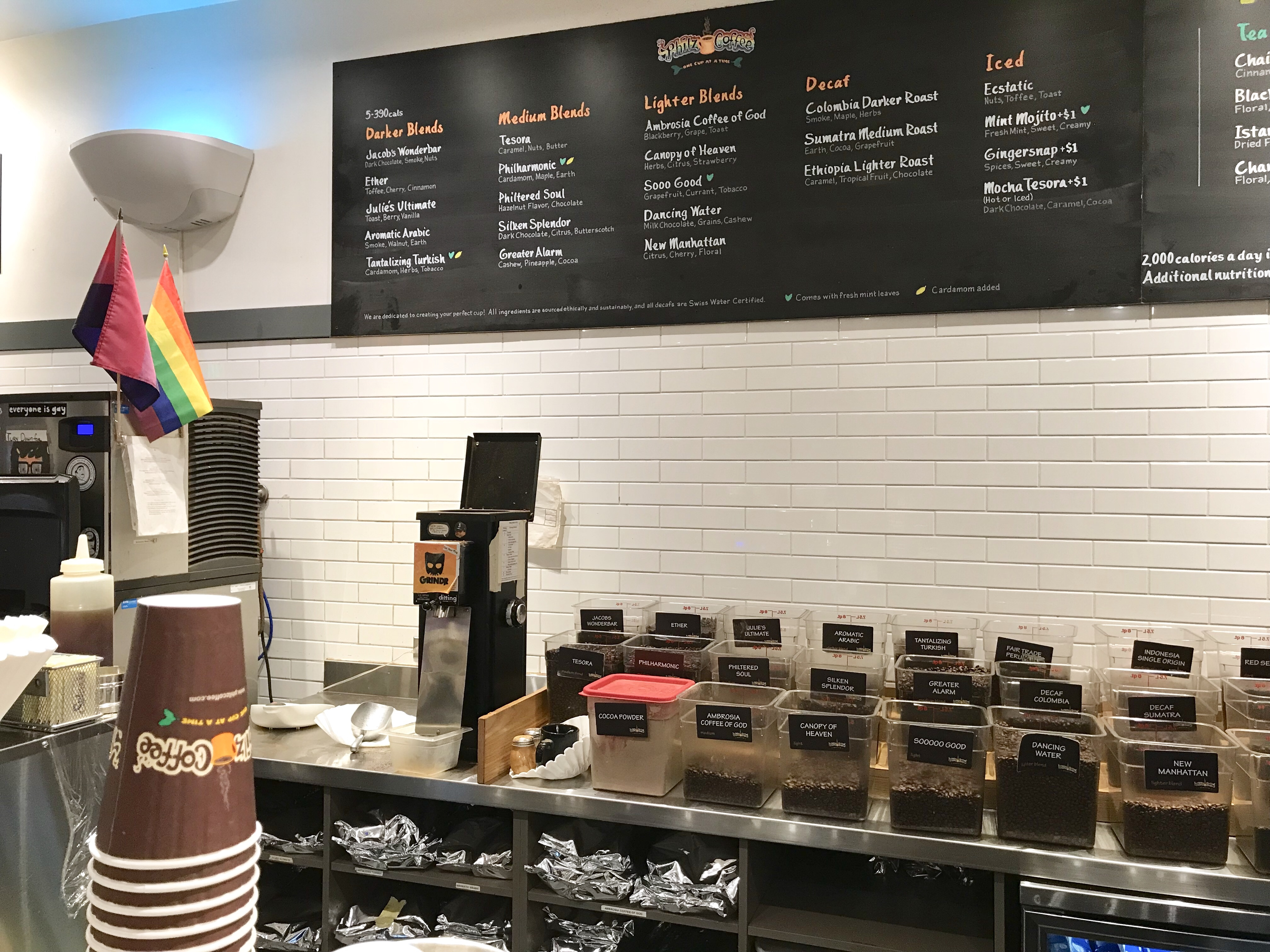
Philz Coffee Menu in San Francisco, CA Location

Philz Coffee has their own system of sweetness and milk levels. A "sweet and creamy" coffee contains a normal amount of cream and sugar. A coffee "Philz’s way" contains reduced amounts of cream and sugar. Finally, a "straight up" coffee contains neither cream nor sugar.

Cream options include heavy cream, milk, almond milk, and oat milk. Sugar options include granulated sugar, artificial sweeteners, and honey.

=== Merchandise ===
In addition to their drinks, Philz Coffee sells a variety of merchandise both in-store and online. Examples include tumblers, hats, shirts and sweatshirts. In addition, they sell both coffee grounds and Keurig pods of their most popular blends as well as Keurig pods for two of their most popular blends. On their website, they also offer a subscription service for their coffee grounds.

== Controversies ==
=== Pandemic layoffs ===
During the pandemic, multiple employees from various stores reported Philz to OSHA for workplace violations related to masks and social distancing. Following these reports, Philz Coffee laid off 181 employees across the country. Despite the company claiming that the reports and the layoffs were not related, many people online linked the two events.

=== Police discount firings ===
Following the George Floyd murder, many employees began protesting Philz Coffee's 20% discount that they offer for law enforcement. This controversy began when a shift lead of the Mission district location posted a story to their social media that captioned, "What's your favorite iced coffee drink, because ours is Arrest the cops that killed Breonna Taylor." Following the incident, the shift lead was fired.

On top of protesting the 20% discount for law enforcement, employees also began protesting the placement of police badges on the stores community boards. Although the company allowed each store to decide whether they would allow the placement of these badges, stores reported that it was difficult for them to actually report to the company that they would not allow the placement of badges. In fact, three baristas in the Costa Mesa location (Southern California) tried to remove the badges from their store. As a result, they were all fired for damaging the store.

Many employees stated that the company's pro-police stance created a hostile environment for their black employees. In response to this controversy, the company launched a diversity, equity, and inclusion program.

=== Palestine pins ===
At the end of 2023, five employees were sent home from the Gilman Street location for wearing Pro-Palestine pins. Despite asking for a written statement from management about why the pins were not allowed, the employees never received any information from management. The employees were sent home and the entire staff unionized.

=== Gluten free class action lawsuit ===
In January 2024, a class action lawsuit was filed against the company for allegedly branding gluten containing products as gluten-free. The plaintiff, Ayaunna Martinez, suffered an allergy attack after consuming a supposedly gluten-free product from a Philz Coffee location. Although the Philz coffee app does state that they cannot guarantee that all products are free of allergens, the lawsuit is seeking that Philz Coffee change its false advertising of their products and pay the members of the lawsuit for damages.

=== Private equity takeover ===
In August 2025, private equity firm Freeman Spogli & Co. acquired Philz for $145 million. While CEO Mahesh Sadarangani received a payout from the deal, current and former employees who had invested in the company through its employee stock ownership and stock option programs saw their common stock canceled and rendered worthless. Initially, Sadarangami had announced that he would be reinvesting part of his windfall into Philz; after local news coverage criticized the deal, he revised his position to reinvest all of his post-tax proceeds. The company subsequently offered current baristas bonuses of $525, with managers receiving larger amounts; the ten former employees affected received no consideration.

=== Pride flag ban ===
In April 2026, Philz Coffee ordered the removal of all LGBT pride flags from its locations, with the stated reason by CEO Mahesh Sadarangani being to create "a more consistent, inclusive experience across all our stores". This was met with a change.org petition started by the chain's baristas, who said that, "Removing these flags risks alienating a core group of team members and loyal customers". The petition reached 4,000 signatures by April 10. On April 17, Philz Coffee announced that the change was being scrapped and pride flags would be permitted to remain in stores.

== See also ==
- List of coffeehouse chains
