= Sustainable coffee =

Coffee grown in a way that meets environmental and social standards

Sustainable coffee is a coffee that is grown and marketed for its sustainability. This includes coffee certified as organic, fair trade, and Rainforest Alliance. Coffee has a number of classifications used to determine the participation of growers (or the supply chain) in various combinations of social, environmental, and economic standards. Coffees fitting such categories and that are independently certified or verified by an accredited third party have been collectively termed "sustainable coffees". This term has entered the lexicon and this segment has quickly grown into a multibillion-dollar industry of its own with potentially significant implications for other commodities as demand and awareness expand.

== Early history and definition ==
Coffee has several types of classifications used to determine the participation of growers (or the supply chain) in various combinations of social, environmental, and economic standards. Coffees fitting such categories and that are independently certified or verified by an accredited third party have been collectively termed "sustainable coffees." The term "sustainable coffee" was first introduced in expert meetings convened by the Smithsonian Institution Migratory Bird Center (SMBC), NAFTA's Commission for Environmental Cooperation (CEC) and the Consumer Choice Council (CCC) in 1998. The CCC's 1999 report, "Sustainable Coffee at the Crossroads" is the first use of the term in the public sphere. It discusses interpretations of sustainability and identifies options such as organic and fair trade as "sustainable coffee", though it does not offer a single functional definition.

The CCC report emerged during the same period as notable World Bank publications and an IMF paper that were among the first to identify the economic and social problems in coffee origins that would be the basis of the coffee crisis that more fully unfolded early in the 2000s. The SMBC contributed some of the earliest evidence of the environmental impacts occurring in some of the most important coffee growing regions of Central America. The ecological and economic concerns were discussed at meetings hosted by the CEC ("Workshop of Experts on Sustainably-produced Mexican Coffee" in Oaxaca in 2000 that resulted in The Oaxaca Declaration. The International Coffee Organization (ICO) voiced and documented some of the factors leading to the crisis, especially the dramatic decline in coffee prices to producers.

== First market estimates ==
Initial trade volumes were estimates because no agency, including the certifiers themselves, accurately tracked them at the time. The first thorough assessment and the first concise definition appeared in research documents commissioned by several organizations in 2001. The Summit Foundation, the Nature Conservancy, the Commission for Environmental Cooperation, the Specialty Coffee Association of America, and the World Bank combined to fund and publish the first large-scale assessment of the markets, the value and the volumes for these coffees (a statistically significant random sample across North America of 1558 retailers, 570 roasters, 312 wholesalers, 120 distributors, and 94 importers). The resulting "Sustainable Coffee Survey of the North American Specialty Coffee Industry" indicated the availability of four primary certified sustainable coffees(in order of importance then): Organic, Fair Trade, Bird Friendly (Smithsonian Institution Migratory Bird Center), and Rainforest Alliance.

During the nadir of the recent coffee crisis (2001–2003), prices reached record low levels (49 US cents/lb according to the ICO indicator price, April 2001) and left many producers in very difficult conditions. By 2003, the idea of sustainable coffee was starting to become a common topic at conferences, in research, and in policy discussions. "The State of Sustainable Coffee" published by the International Coffee Organization and the International Institute for Sustainable Development (IISD) in 2003 noted that sustainable coffees provide new opportunities to coffee producers who face difficult prices and production conditions that otherwise keep them in poverty. The book was the first dedicated to the topic of sustainable coffee and outlines the development of evolving concepts for sustainability in coffee and was also the first to identify the market channels, market conditions and volumes for sustainable coffees in European markets and Japan.

David Hallam, the Food and Agriculture Organization of the United Nations' (FAO) commodity chief, in 2003 notes that "...organic and fair trade products can also command a premium price." However, these premiums were somewhat limited. By 2004, a World Bank report, "Coffee Markets: New Paradigms in Global Supply and Demand" substantiated that structural shifts in the global industry of coffee will likely hinder significant advances for many producing nations to more equitably participate in what is the world's most valuable agricultural trade product. It also confirmed coffee's importance in more than 50 countries and its value in a number of producer countries as a primary, and sometimes only, source of cash income for many farmers. It noted that "differentiated segments", in which certified coffees such as organic and fair trade are included, "can provide producers with competitive advantages and added value." It further suggested that these are "important because of their growth rates and their potential to provide better social, economic, or environmental benefits for farmers". By this point, in mid-decade, the category of sustainable coffees was firmly established as one of the emerging paradigms in the global production and trade of coffee. The same World Bank report identified that the production of such sustainable coffees had expanded beyond mostly Latin American origins to include modest exports from Africa and Asia.

== Sustainable coffee initiatives expand ==
By the mid-2000s, sustainable coffees came to include new certification initiatives such as UTZ Certified and Common Code for the Coffee Community (4C) as well as certifications used exclusively by individual firms (Starbucks and Nespresso). Most certifications are now widely available not only in specialty stores and cafés but also in major supermarkets and under national brand names of global food companies such as Kraft and Sara Lee. At the ICO 2010 World Coffee Conference, former World Bank coffee expert Daniele Giovannucci noted that in 2009 more than 8% of the global trade in raw (green) coffee was certified to one of the major sustainability initiatives. As of 2016, at least 34% of global coffee production was compliant with voluntary sustainability standards.

Though growing quickly, sustainable certified coffees still constitute only a few percent of the total purchasing of the largest coffee brands owned by Nestlé, Kraft, and Sara Lee. The leading global brands, in terms of volumes purchased, are Starbucks, whose private certification (C.A.F.E. Practices) covers nearly 90% of its purchases, and Nespresso whose purchase of sustainable coffees (Rainforest Alliance Certified) now accounts for more than half of its total buying.

A novel type of sustainable coffee initiatives is the development of synthetic coffee. In 2021, media outlets reported that the world's first synthetic coffee products have been created by two bioeconomy companies, still awaiting regulatory approvals for near-term commercialization. Such products – which can be produced via cellular agriculture in bioreactors and for which multiple companies' R&D have acquired substantial funding – may have equal or highly similar effects, molecular-level composition and taste as natural products but use less water, generate less carbon emissions, require less labor and cause no deforestation.

== Current issues ==
From a market share of zero to a share 8% of the global coffee industry in one decade suggests that sustainable coffees are no longer a small niche. Efforts are underway by various certification bodies, non-governmental organizations (NGOs) and global food companies to develop the production of sustainable coffees in the poorest regions of the world, such as Africa, and to measure the actual impacts that the various initiatives, standards and certifications. Whilst a number of papers have been published on the topic, high quality research is still lacking. Resources for the Future, a research think tank, undertook a broad literature review in 2010 and identified 37 relevant studies, only 14 of which use methods likely to generate credible results. Allen Blackman and Jorge Rivera, the authors of "The Evidence Base for Environmental and Socioeconomic Impacts of 'Sustainable' Certification" conclude that empirical evidence is limited and that much more research is necessary to understand whether these initiatives are having the claimed impacts.

Furthermore, private certification programs are attempting to fill gaps in existing government and international regulations. Third-party initiatives bypass the structures in place by both the state and the coffee industry. Existing as a private enterprise, accountable mostly to their mission and funders, non-governmental can become susceptible to neoliberal market forces. In a desire to expand their specialty markets, certifications have the potential to become more of a branding technique to attract consumers with specialty labels. Certification initiatives rely on consumer choice, a neoliberal intervention which can incite NGOs to prioritize market growth as opposed to the ecological and humanitarian protection at the core of the organization.

There are however regulations that exist. The International Social and Environmental Accreditation and Labelling (ISEAL) Alliance is a global association for social and environmental standards whose members include many of the major standards systems active in sustainable coffee such as: Fair trade, Rainforest Alliance, UTZ Certified and the 4C Association. Its members have resolved to abide by applying a new Impacts Code in 2010 that requires them to develop a transparent Assessment Plan to provide reasonable measurement of their impacts. Another initiative is already developing and applying scientific metrics to understand sustainability impacts at the field level. The non-profit Committee on Sustainability Assessment (COSA), is a neutral consortium founded through the United Nations Conference on Trade and Development (UNCTAD), the International Institute for Sustainable Development (IISD), and the UN International Trade Centre (ITC) in 2006 to develop a scientifically credible framework to assess social, environmental, and economic dimensions of sustainability initially in the coffee sector. COSA emerged from the concerns of coffee industry practitioners about the lack of knowledge and sound scientific inquiry on what happens in the process of adopting sustainability initiatives. The unanimous International Coffee Organization endorsement of the COSA program (2016) noted that COSA builds management capacity with local partnerships in producing countries to facilitate an understanding of the effects (costs and benefits) of the many sustainability initiatives.

The COSA Measuring Sustainability Report: Coffee and Cocoa in 12 Countries outlines the main issues facing sustainable coffee and presents the results of their research (2009–2013) into the economic, social and environmental impacts of Voluntary Sustainability Standards (VSS).The United Nations International Trade Centre (ITC) and its Trade for Sustainable Development program is also developing a global online platform to better understand the distinctions of the diverse sustainability initiatives with basic comparisons of the standards and also a mapping system of their availability.

An emerging issue in sustainable coffee is the adoption of a life-cycle approach to the use of spent coffee grounds.

== See also ==
- List of coffee beverages
