= Machwitz Kaffee =

German coffee roasting company and brand

W. Machwitz GmbH
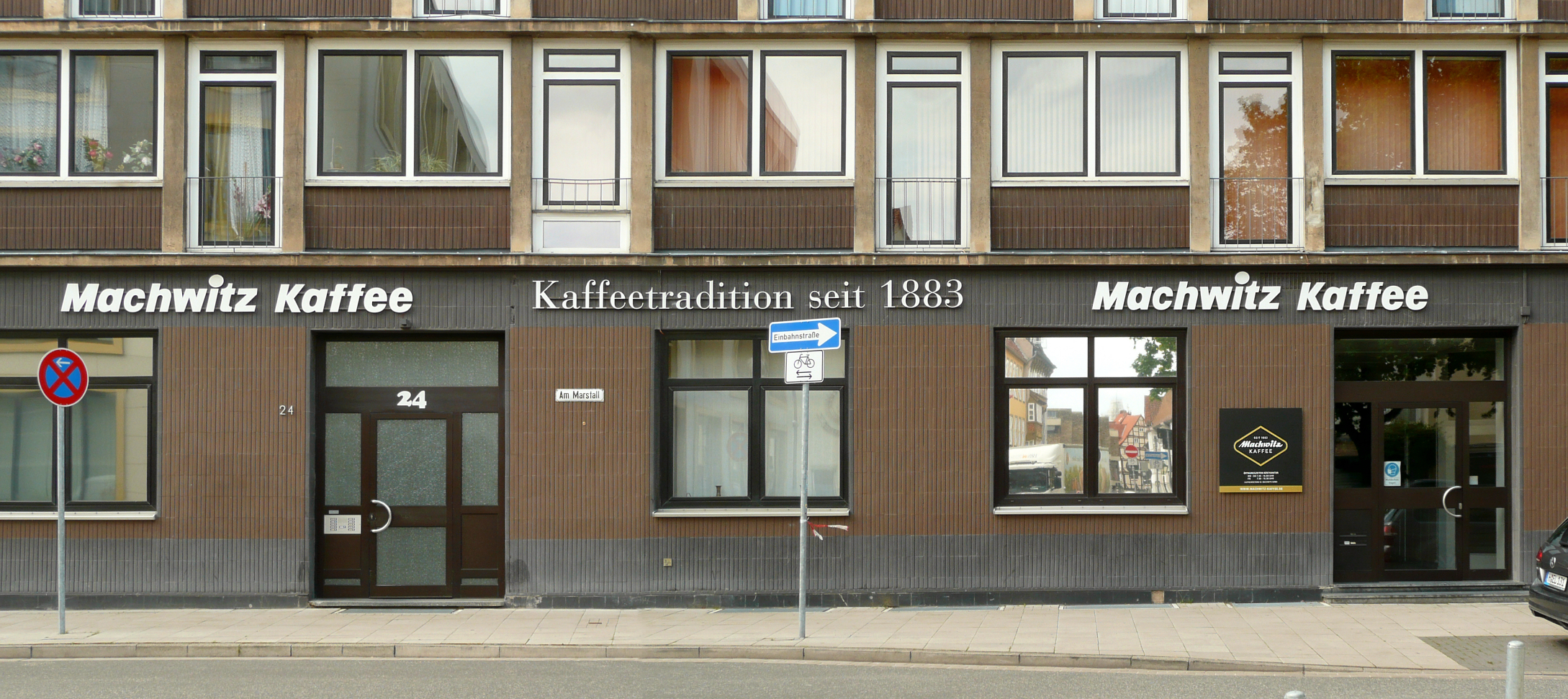
- Machwitz Kaffee's headquarters in Hanover, including updated company logo
- Company type: Private
- Industry: Food processing
- Founded: 1883; 143 years ago in Danzig Kingdom of Prussia
- Founder: Wilhelm Machwitz
- Headquarters: Am Marstall 18-24, 30159 Hanover, Germany (since 1919)
- Key people: Wilhelm Machwitz (founder), Walter Koch (1911–1998, bought the company in 1948), Jörg Walter Koch (b. circ. 1949, W. Koch's son), Maximilian Koch ( March 18, 1981, J. Koch's son)
- Products: Packaged foods, roasted coffee, chocolates, tea, sweets, colonial goods, beverages
- Total equity: €912,420 (2021)
- Number of employees: fewer than 25
- Website: www.machwitz-kaffee.de

Machwitz Kaffee (German pronunciation: [ˈmaxvɪts kaˈfeː]) is a German family-owned coffee roaster and retailer from Hanover, Germany. Founded in Gdańsk in 1883 as a consumer goods store, the headquarters moved to Hanover in 1919 and began specialising in coffee.

The company was purchased by Walter Koch (1911–1998) in 1948, and has remained in the family's ownership ever since.

From 1952 to 1956, Walter Koch was a member of the Hanover City Council, representing the Deutsche Partei (German Party), a national-conservative and monarchist political party which appealed to sentiments of German nationalism and nostalgia for the German Empire.

In 1958, he bought and restored the 16th-century Hehlen moated castle, which remains in the family's ownership to this day.

== Company logo controversy ==
In the 2010s, Machwitz Kaffee's original logo came under repeated criticism for depicting racist, colonial and degrading imagery, and for being out of touch with modern society.

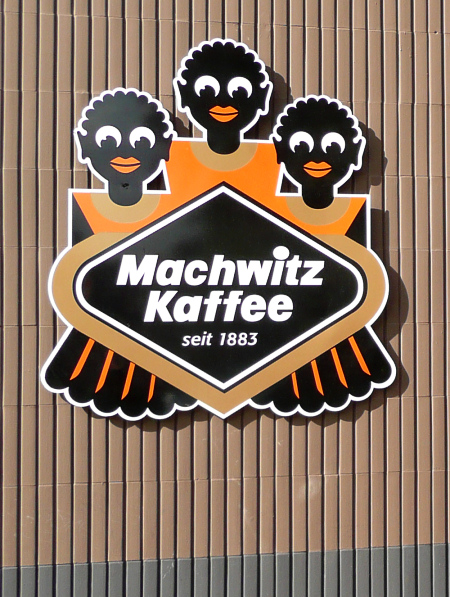
Machwitz Kaffee's former logo

In 2017 and 2018, Decolonize Hannover – a local alliance raising awareness of racism and of Hanover's colonial past – launched two online petitions, demanding the company change its insensitive colonial-era and ethnically stereotyping logo. Both petitions attracted over 1,600 signatures. The company did not initially comment on the petitions.

In 2018 and 2021, company owner and CEO Jörg-Walter Koch repeatedly defended the company's logo, stating it had been retained as part of the company's "tradition". In the same official statement, Koch also used „Dunkelhäutige“ to refer to people of colour – a term that is widely considered outdated and offensive.

In 2023, reports emerged that the company had quietly updated its company logo, removing the racially insensitive elements in the process.
