= La Colombe Coffee Roasters =

Coffee roaster and retailer located in the United States

- Type: Subsidiary
- Industry: Coffee
- Founded: 1994; 32 years ago
- Founder: JP Iberti; Todd Carmichael
- Headquarters: Philadelphia, Pennsylvania, United States
- Key people: Hamdi Ulukaya
- Products: Coffee
- Parent: Chobani
- Website: www.lacolombe.com

La Colombe Coffee Roasters (originally La Colombe Torrefaction) is an American coffee roaster and retailer headquartered in Philadelphia. Founded in 1994, the company has cafés in locations including Philadelphia, New York City, Chicago, Austin, Los Angeles, San Diego, and Washington, D.C. In 2023, it was acquired by Chobani for $900 million.

La Colombe is representative of third-wave coffee. Its recognition includes a BevNet award for "Rising Star" in 2017.

== History ==
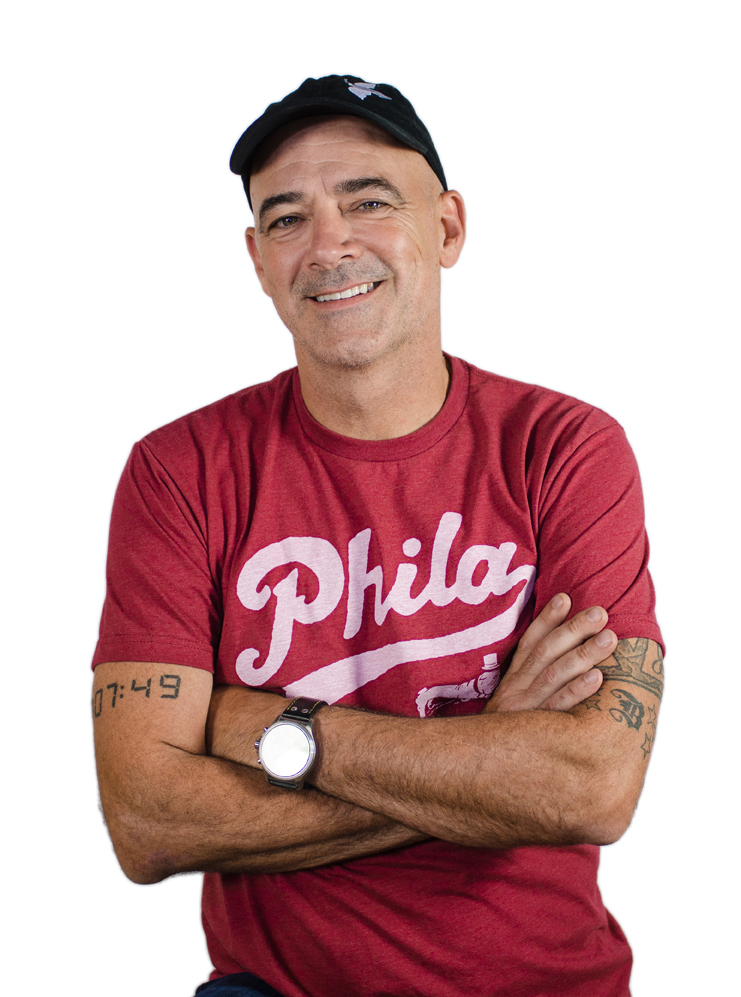
Todd Carmichael, co-founder

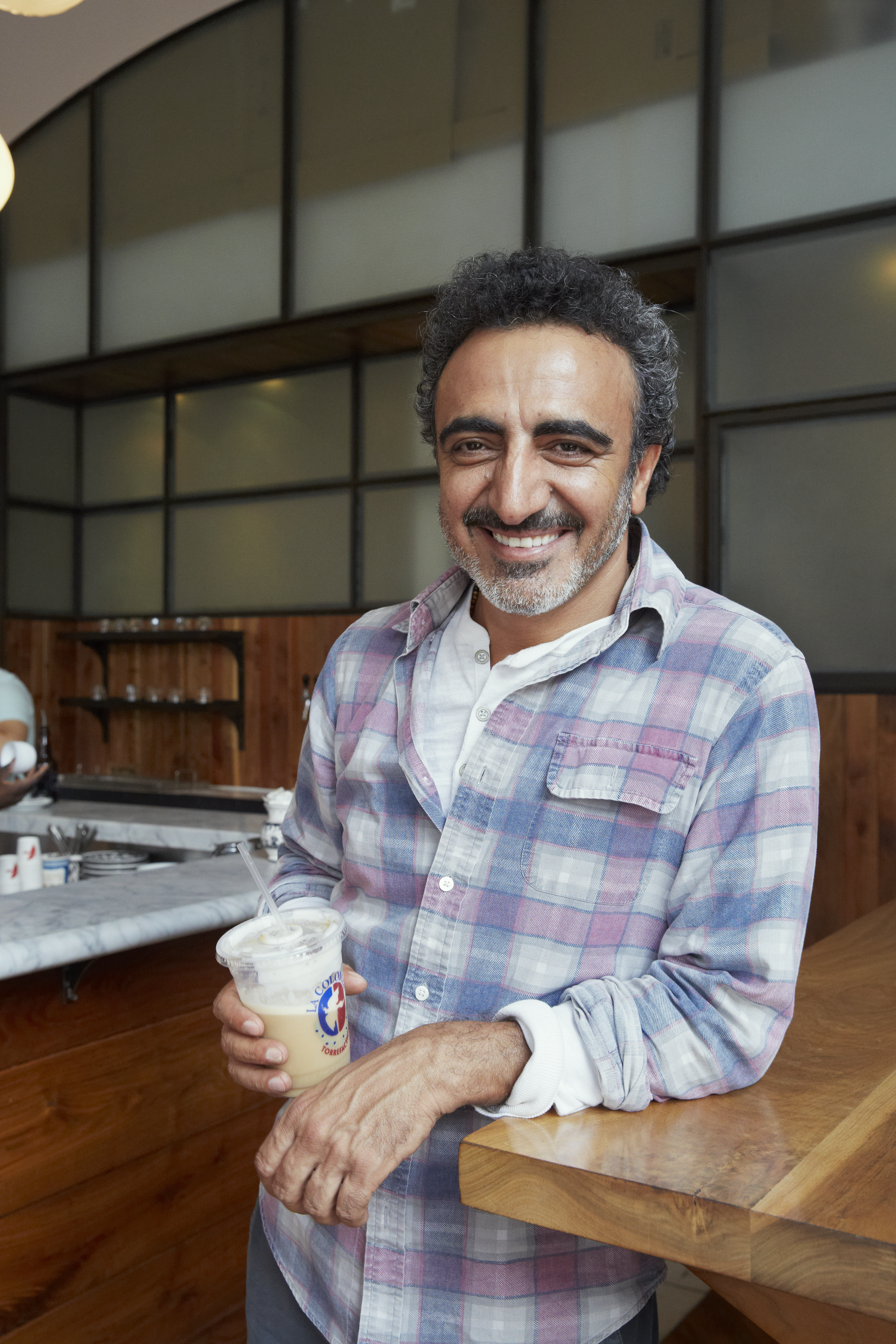
Hamdi Ulukaya, current owner

La Colombe was founded by Todd Carmichael and JP Iberti in 1994 in the Rittenhouse Square neighborhood of Philadelphia.

In 2015, Hamdi Ulukaya, founder of Chobani, purchased a share of the company. Ulukaya bought out private equity firm Goode Partners to gain his stake, and helped the company raise $28.5 million to fund plans for expansion. This purchase made La Colombe one of several small-scale coffee roasters that received large investments or were acquired outright in 2015.

In July 2023, Keurig Dr Pepper invested $300 million in La Colombe in exchange for 33% of the company.

In December 2023, Chobani fully acquired La Colombe for $900 million. As part of the deal, Keurig Dr Pepper had its 33% equity converted to a minority position in Chobani. Chobani took a $550 million loan to fund the acquisition.

== Locations ==
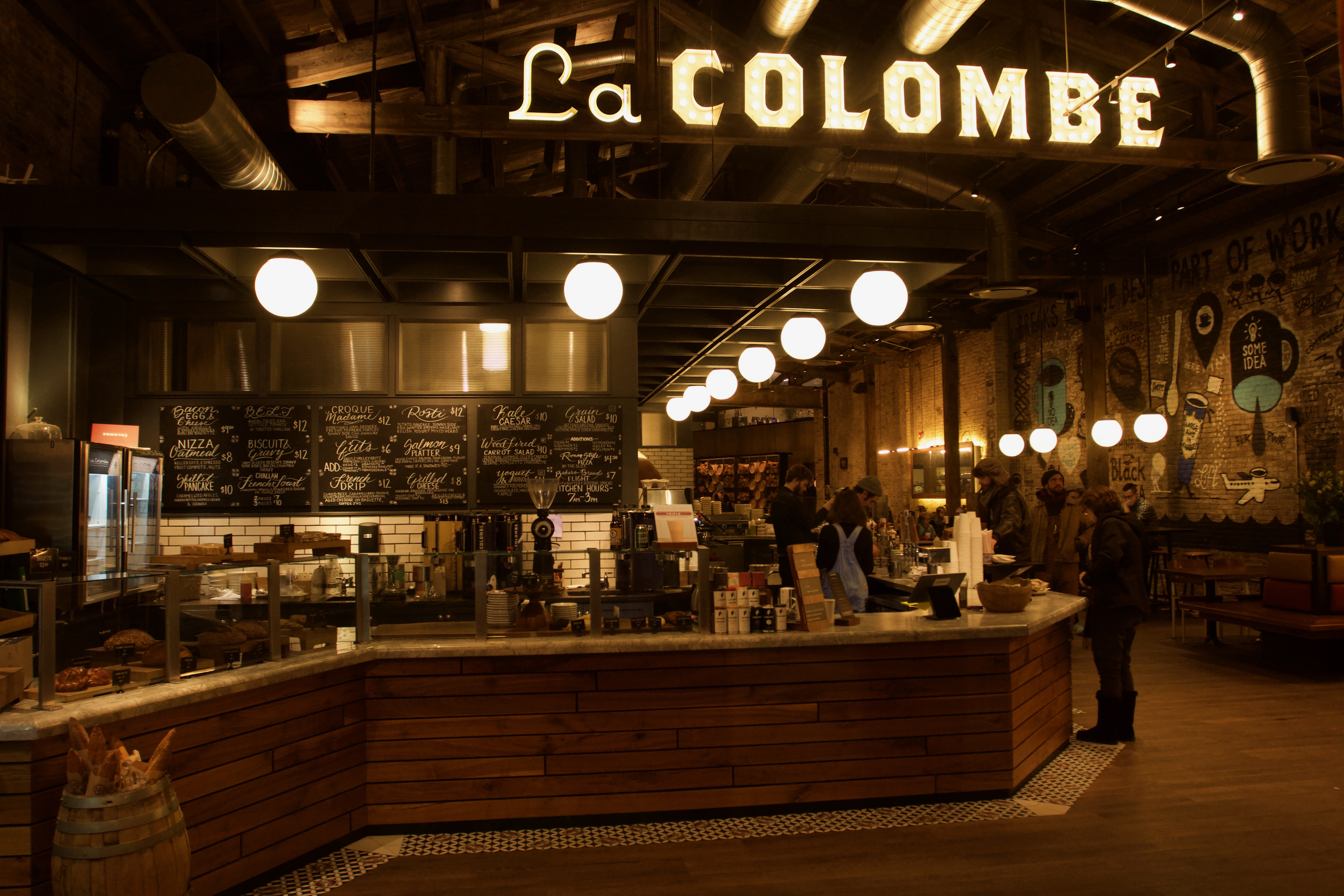
La Colombe's store in Fishtown, Philadelphia

The company's earliest stores included its original site in Rittenhouse Square as well as its New York City, Chicago, and Washington, D.C. locations. Locations in New York were opened in 2007 and 2009 in Tribeca and SoHo, respectively. The first location in Chicago was opened in 2011. The second Philadelphia location was opened in Dilworth Park (near Philadelphia City Hall) in 2011.

In 2013, the company operated three locations in Seoul, South Korea.

Headquarters moved to a new construction in Fishtown, Philadelphia in 2015. The construction had been voted on by residents in 2013. The same year, the company announced plans to expand to 150 new locations in the next three to four years. Expansion to Boston began in September 2015.

Expansion to Los Angeles was announced in early 2016, with locations in Beverly Hills and Silver Lake. New locations in Chinatown, Washington, D.C. and Lincoln Park, Chicago were announced in 2016. In San Diego, a new location opened in Westfield UTC in fall 2017.

In 2021, a location was announced in Austin, Texas inside a Whole Foods Market, the company's first Texas location.

In 2025, both locations in Boston closed (at 745 Atlantic Ave. in Leather District and at 29 Northern Ave. in the Seaport District), with the owners citing financial performance of the locations and other factors.

As of 2025, La Colombe advertises on its website 30 locations in the United States, in Philadelphia, New York City, Washington, D.C., Boston, Chicago, Austin, Los Angeles, and San Diego.

Coop de Ville, a restaurant in the Strip District, Pittsburgh, features a walk-up window serving La Colombe coffee and espresso drinks. The restaurant opened in 2020.

== Retail products ==
In 2016, the company began offering a canned version of the Draft Latte, a cold-pressed espresso and frothed milk latte which was available on tap in stores. Draft Lattes were initially available in four flavors. The cans for the latte were designed by CEO Todd Carmichael and produced by Crown Holdings. The can employed a valve mechanism at the base for injection of nitrous oxide. Manufacturing of the cans moved from Pennsylvania to a new facility in Norton Shores, Michigan in 2016.

A Nitro cold brew was also in the works around 2015.

Other products include Different Drum, a coffee-infused rum, produced at a micro-distillery located in its Fishtown, Philadelphia cafe, and a line of La Colombe single-origin and blended roasted coffees, which are available for purchase in retail stores or via the company's website. The company also produces retail cold brew in larger 42oz bottles.

In 2020, the company announced a can of instant coffee with new self-heating technology.

== Collaborations ==
In 2013, La Colombe partnered with the Clinton Foundation to found the Haiti Coffee Academy. The organization's stated aim is to improve coffee growers’ livelihoods in Haiti through training programs for smallholder farmers, a demonstration farm and nursery, and efforts to strengthen the supply chain for both local and export markets for Haitian coffee.

In 2016, La Colombe collaborated with Yards Brewing Company, also in the Philadelphia area, to produce a coffee stout to be served in local Shake Shack branches.

Also in 2016, the company collaborated with the Icelandic brewer Einstök and again with Yards on Snorri's Awakening, a coffee pale ale.

In 2021, the company collaborated with Whole Foods Market to open new stores in New York City and Austin.

== See also ==
- List of coffeehouse chains
- List of coffee companies
