= Colectivo Coffee Roasters =

U.S. coffee company

- Formerly: Alterra Coffee Roasters
- Type: Private
- Industry: Retail
- Founded: 1993; 33 years ago in Milwaukee, Wisconsin
- Headquarters: Milwaukee, Wisconsin, U.S.
- Number of locations: 20
- Key people: Ward Fowler and Paul Miller
- Products: Coffee
- Website: Colectivo Coffee Roasters

Colectivo Coffee Roasters is a specialty coffee roaster based in Milwaukee, Wisconsin. Until July 2013, the company was known as Alterra Coffee Roasters. Colectivo roasts its coffee and makes all its food products in Milwaukee and is known nationwide as a wholesale coffee supplier.

On July 28, 2013, Alterra announced a rebrand to the new name Colectivo Coffee. The Alterra Coffee brand was sold to Mars Inc in April 2010. The Alterra Coffee brand was later sold to Lavazza as part of the sale of Mars's drinks business to Lavazza in 2018.

== History ==
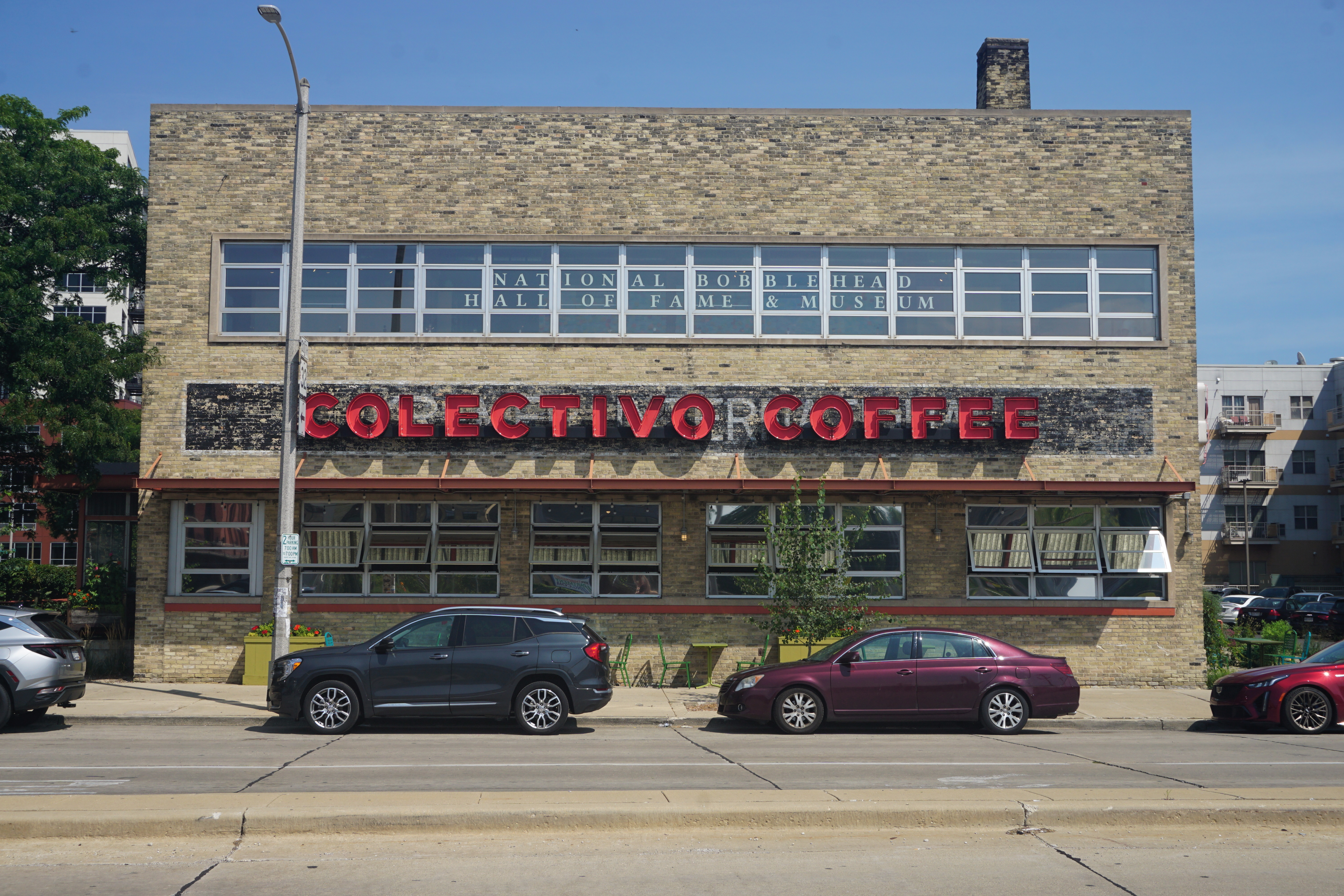
Colectivo Coffee Roasters and National Bobblehead Hall of Fame and Museum

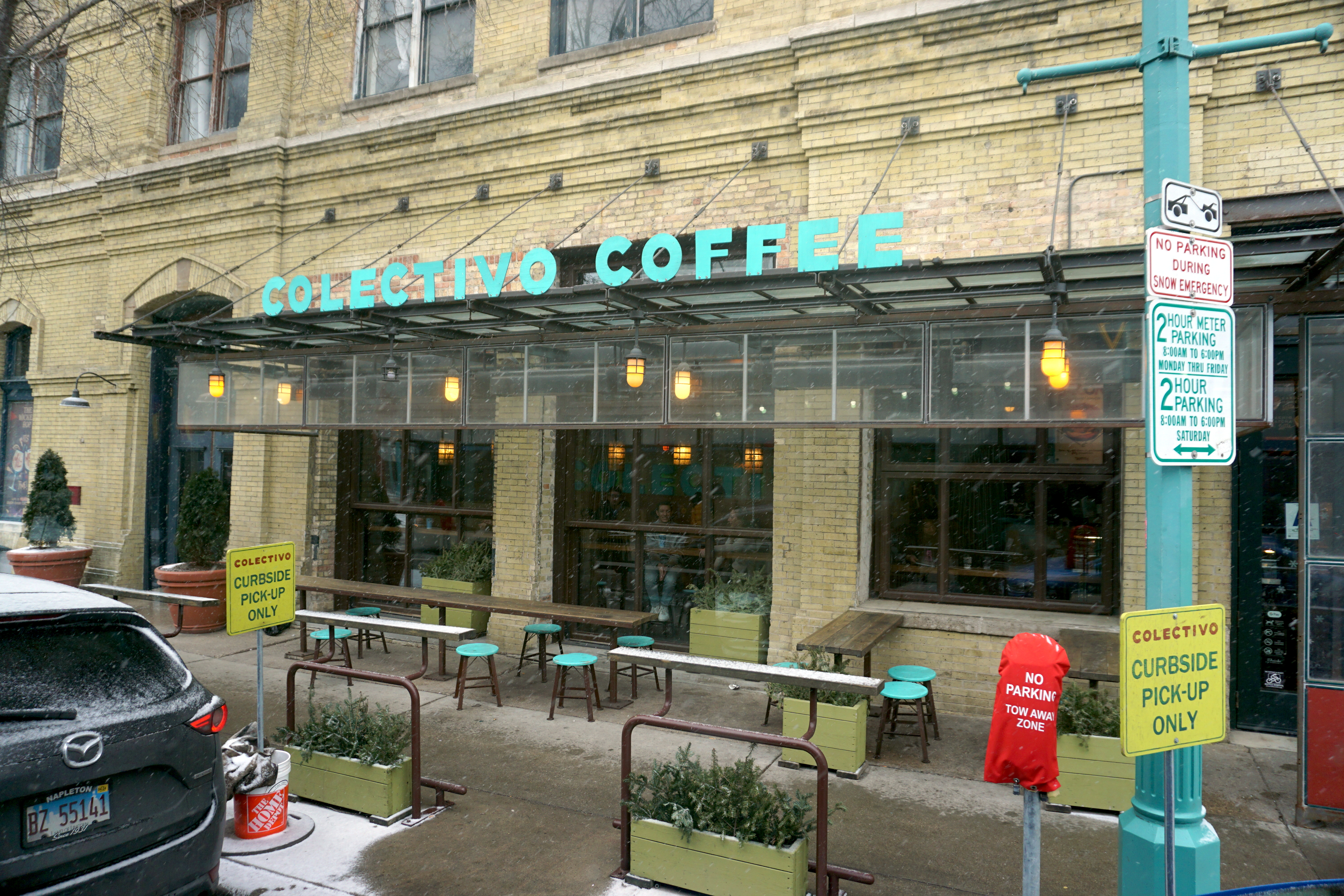
Colectivo Coffee in Milwaukee's Historic Third Ward

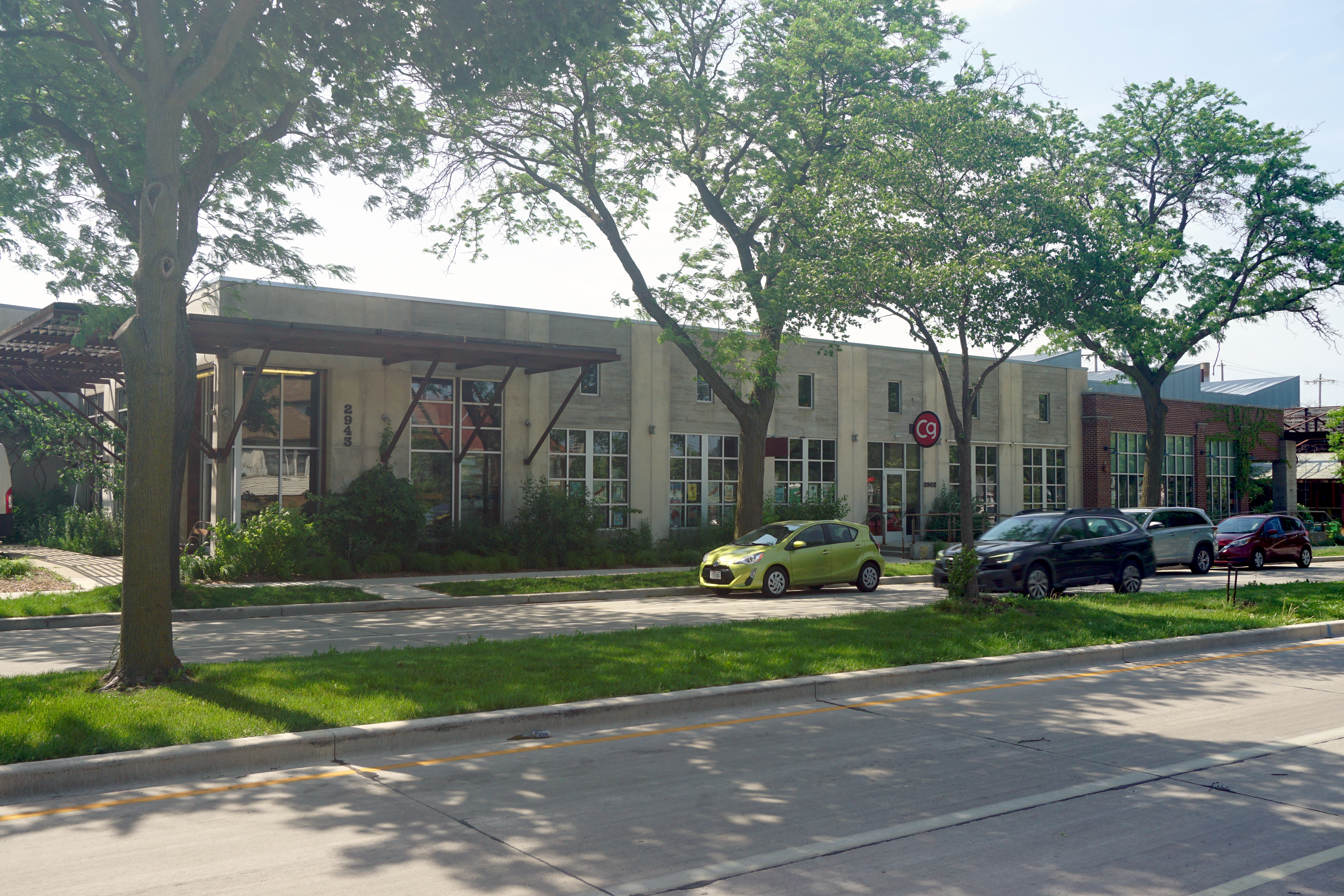
Colectivo Coffee Humboldt Boulevard

The company was founded in 1993 by Lincoln Fowler, Ward Fowler and Paul Miller. There are currently 20 locations owned and operated by Colectivo in the Milwaukee, Madison, and Chicago metropolitan areas.

Alterra Baking Company (now Troubadour Bakery) was created in 1999, and in 2007, moved to a new location on Humboldt Boulevard in Milwaukee's Riverwest neighborhood along with the roastery. In 2012, a new bakery was built in Milwaukee's Bay View neighborhood. Colectivo's roastery and headquarters remain on Humboldt Boulevard. In 2010, Mars Incorporated acquired the rights to the Alterra Coffee Roasters name. Mars uses the brand on its single-serve coffee packets for Flavia office brewers. The Milwaukee-based Alterra itself remained local while continuing to use the name and acquired resources to expand.

In 2017, Colectivo expanded to include several locations in Chicago, beginning with the Lincoln Park and Logan Square neighborhoods. In 2018, Colectivo also added a location in suburban Evanston near Northwestern University's main campus. In 2019, Colectivo opened their 21st location in Wicker Park.

In 2021, Colectivo workers unionized, to the chagrin of the owners. In May 2022 the NLRB issued a final decision, ruling that the employees had indeed won their election and could begin contract negotiations with management.

== Name change ==
In 2013, the company changed its name to Colectivo Coffee Roasters. The Alterra name is no longer associated with Colectivo, and was used exclusively by Mars Drinks until Lavazza bought the Alterra name as part of buying Mars's coffee business. The name Colectivo is taken from the "artful and funky buses used for public transportation across Latin America... and the iconic part of everyday life they represent for everyday people." The owners and a few employees traveled to Guatemala and bought a vintage restored 1958 colectivo, which is to make appearances in Milwaukee beginning in 2013.

== Recognition ==
The company has been recognized by the United States Environmental Protection Agency for its extensive efforts in expanding green power awareness. It was listed as an EPA Green Power Partner in recognition of its 100% use of green energy sourced from wind power, biomass decomposition, solar energy, and small hydroelectric plants. In 2004, it won the Green Power Leadership Award. In 2008, the Humboldt Boulevard location won Best Environmentally Friendly Project from the Milwaukee Business Journal Real Estate Awards. It was also awarded the Heart of the Community Award by Wisconsin Commercial Real Estate Women. The 2008 Building Blocks Award from State Farm Insurance MANDI Awards also went to the Humboldt cafe.

In 2013, the Bay View cafe and bakery received the Real Estate Award from the Milwaukee Business Journal for its "impact on the Milwaukee Area." Complex City Guide named Colectivo one of the best coffee roasters in the US in 2013. OnMilwaukee awarded Colectivo "Milwaukee's Best Coffee Shop/Cafe" of 2013, with the company winning both editors' choice and readers' choice. The company has been sending baristas to compete in the United States Barista Championship events since 2007. Barista Trainer Scott Lucey placed 3rd in the 2008 United States Barista Championship and was the 2009 Great Lakes Regional Barista Champion.

== Colectivo Union Dispute ==
On March 9, 2021, ballots were sent to more than 300 Colectivo workers for a vote on unionization, with the IBEW as their bargaining representative. On April 9, ballots were counted resulting in a 99–99 tie, with 16 ballots unopened due to challenges from Colectivo. 7 of the 16 ballots were counted after review from the NLRB, with the new tally being 106 for unionization to 99 against. Following this, Colectivo released a statement on their website that was also emailed to customers, stating that, "We are disappointed by this result because a majority of our coworkers did not vote in favor of unionization and because the NLRB counted votes of several individuals who announced their resignations prior to the close of the election", but reaffirming that, "[Colectivo] will, of course, respect the rules and bargain in good faith." This statement was criticized by the union and its supporters for containing false claims.

In the months following the election, the latter statement also faced criticism, as Colectivo continually appealed to the NLRB for various reasons, requesting that they not certify the vote. The union has called this stalling, and also attacked the company over their hiring of an anti-union consultant before the election, who they said held mandatory meetings for employees encouraging them to vote against unionization. In cooperation with the Milwaukee Chapter of the Democratic Socialists of America and the Shorewood High School Chapter of the Young Democratic Socialists of America, Colectivo workers protested outside of Colectivo establishments in Milwaukee, handing out flyers with a QR code on them that linked people to a pre-filled email to Colectivo's owners and local legislators, asking Colectivo to support the union and stop challenging the vote. Flyers posted in the village of Shorewood were later removed. Ultimately the Colectivo workers would win these challenges, with the NLRB deciding in May 2022 that they had indeed won their election.
