= Revelator Coffee =

American coffee roasting company

Revelator Coffee Company LLC

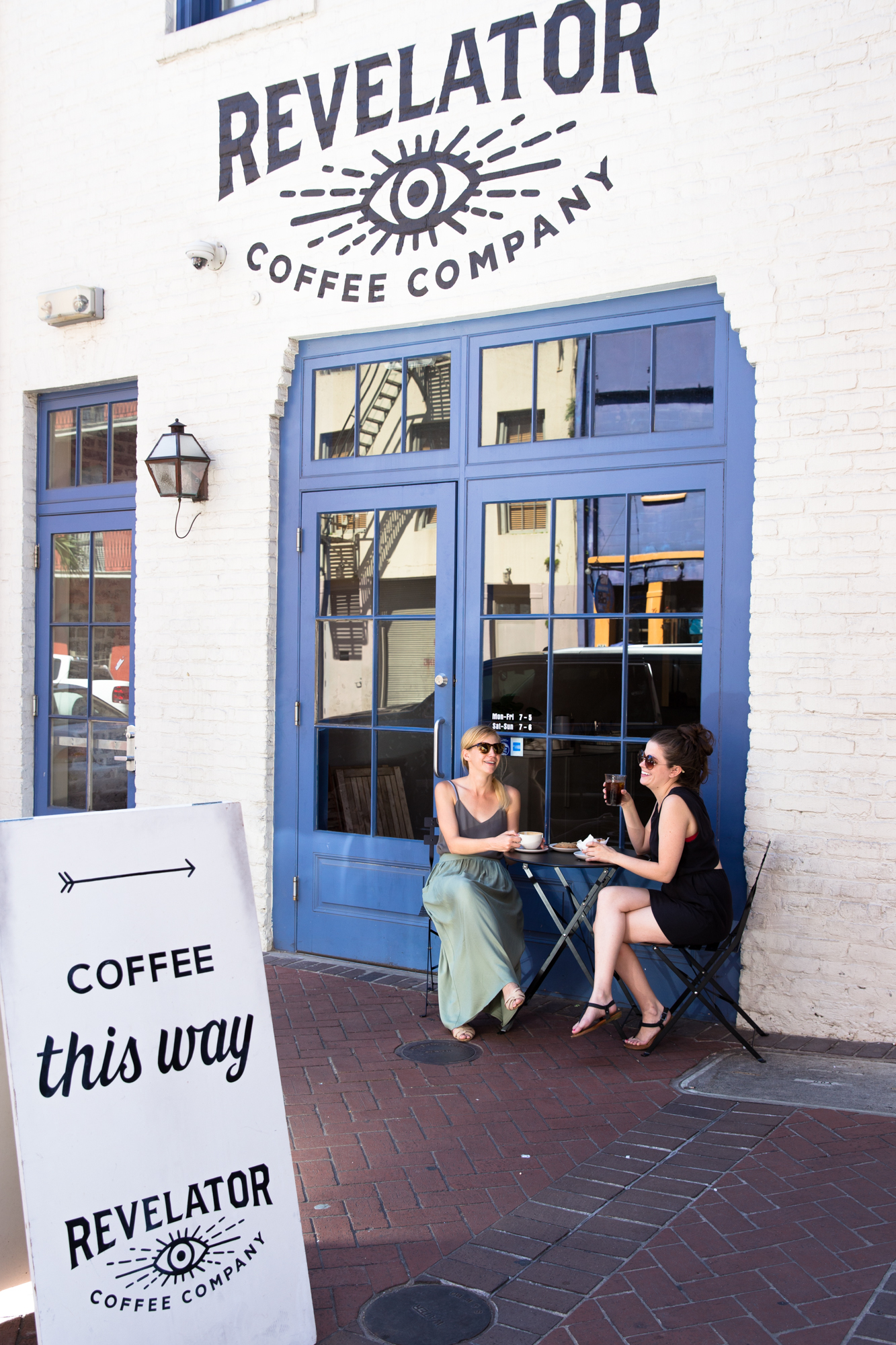
- The storefront of a Revelator Coffee shop in New Orleans
- Type: Private
- Industry: Coffee industry
- Founded: October 9, 2013; 12 years ago in New Orleans, Louisiana, U.S.
- Founders: Josh Owen; Emma Chevalier; Elizabeth Pogue
- Headquarters: Birmingham, Alabama, U.S.
- Number of locations: 2 coffee shops (2022)
- Area served: United States
- Key people: Josh Owen; (president); Emma Chevalier; (green buyer); Meredith Singer; (director of marketing)
- Number of employees: 165 (2017)
- Subsidiaries: Wired Puppy; Octane Coffee
- Website: revelatorcoffee.com

Revelator Coffee Company LLC is an American coffee roasting company headquartered in Birmingham, Alabama. The company was founded by Josh Owen, Emma Chevalier and Elizabeth Pogue in October 2013 and was originally located in New Orleans, Louisiana, until moving to Birmingham in February 2015. Revelator Coffee opened its first coffee shop in Birmingham in October 2014 and operated 20 locations around the southern United States, as well as two in Massachusetts. The company acquired Boston, Massachusetts-based Wired Puppy and Atlanta, Georgia-based Octane Coffee in 2017 and operated coffee shops under their brands. Since 2020, most locations have shut down. Currently they have 2 locations in operation.

== History ==
=== Foundation and expansion ===
Revelator Coffee was incorporated under the laws of Delaware on October 9, 2013. The company was founded by Josh Owen, Emma Chevalier and Elizabeth Pogue, who served as president, creative director and director of operations, respectively. The company was officially announced in March 2014, with its corporate headquarters, including their roastery, in New Orleans, Louisiana. They initially planned to open four shops, one in New Orleans, another in Birmingham, Alabama and two in Chattanooga, Tennessee, to serve as pilot projects.

In February 2015, Revelator Coffee announced that they were moving their corporate headquarters and roastery to a 10,000 square feet warehouse located in Birmingham. The move aimed at drawing the company's offices closer to its Birmingham-based prime location, as well finding a central spot in the south-east of the United States.

In January 2017, Revelator Coffee acquired Wired Puppy, a Boston, Massachusetts-based coffeehouse with outposts in Boston and Provincetown, after its owner was forced to sell the company due to staff shortage. In March 2017, Revelator Coffee announced that they were acquiring Octane Coffee, an Atlanta, Georgia-based coffeehouse chain Tony Riffel, who co-founded Octane Coffee in 2003, became a member of Revelator Coffee's advisory board as part of the two companies' merger, before later being promoted to director of retail. The Octane Coffee brand was kept alive for usage on their shops, while both Revelator Coffee and Octane Coffee products were sold at each's locations. All Octane Coffee and Wired Puppy locations are set to be re-branded by July 2018.

After this dramatic and rapid expansion, most locations were shuttered between 2018 and 2021. As of 2022, only two remain in operation. One in Birmingham, Alabama, and another in New Orleans. In December, 2023 Revelator announced on Facebook that they would be "closing their [retail] locations, to focus on serving [their] customers through our website, grocery stores, and wholesale partners." handing their New Orleans location over to Nova Espresso.

=== Locations ===
Revelator Coffee operated 18 coffee shops and two restaurants across the southern United States, as well as two further coffee shops in Massachusetts. The first shop was opened in Birmingham, Alabama on October 22, 2014 in Whitmire Lofts. It was the first of four locations set to serve as the company's pilot projects. The company has since expanded having shops in places that include Birmingham, Nashville, Tennessee, Charleston, South Carolina, Chattanooga, and Atlanta, Georgia. Several of the shops replaced other coffee shops.

== See also ==
- List of coffeehouse chains
- List of coffee companies
