= James Hoffmann =

Barista, YouTuber, businessman, and author

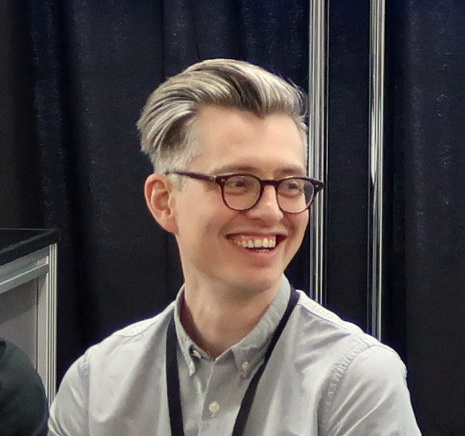
- Hoffmann at the 2018 London Coffee Festival
- Born: James Alexander Hoffmann; 1979 or 1980 (age 46–47); Stafford, England
- Education: Uppingham School; Durham University
- Occupations: Barista; author; YouTuber
- Movement: Third wave coffee
- Awards: World Barista Champion, 2007

YouTube information
- Channel: James Hoffmann
- Subscribers: 2.5 million
- Views: 380.5 million
- Last updated: 19 May 2026
- Website: www.jameshoffmann.co.uk

James Alexander Hoffmann (born 1979/1980) is an English barista, YouTuber, entrepreneur, coffee consultant, and author. Hoffmann first came to prominence after winning the World Barista Championship in 2007 and has since been credited as a pioneer of Britain's third-wave coffee movement. Hoffmann has published three books, including The World Atlas of Coffee, amassed a significant following on YouTube, started several businesses, including the specialty coffee roaster Square Mile Coffee Roasters, and consulted for several coffee ventures.

== Early life ==
Born in Stafford, Staffordshire, Hoffmann grew up in the Lake District in North West England. He is a graduate of Durham University.

In 2003, Hoffmann released an EP under the stage name "King Seven" which featured "bell chimes, panned-and-swirling acoustic guitars and careful, sometimes glitchy, percussion choices." He also worked as a croupier in a Leeds casino and in the wine industry before entering the coffee industry.

== Career ==
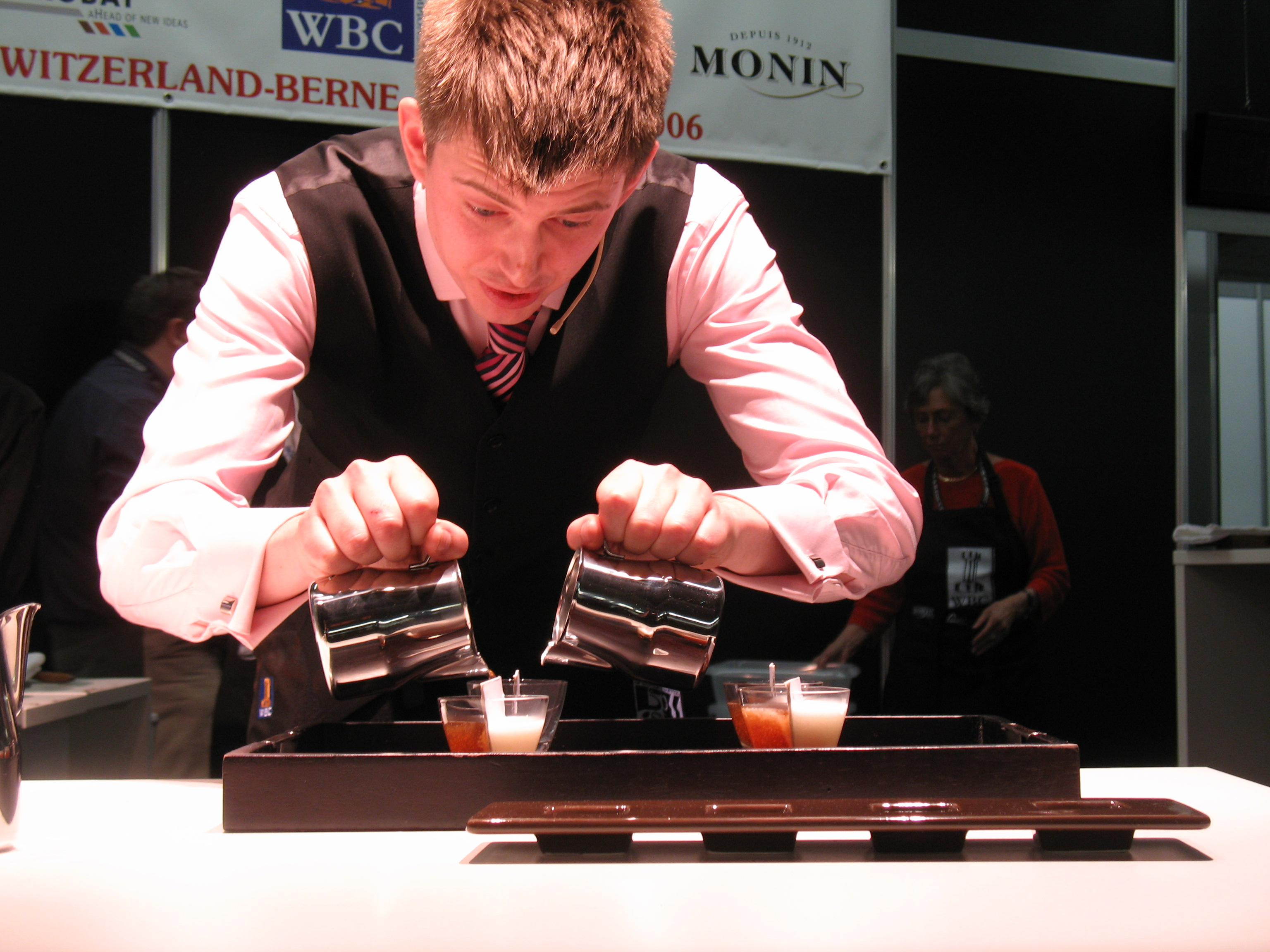
James Hoffmann at the 2006 World Barista Championship in Switzerland

One of Hoffmann's first jobs after joining the coffee industry in the early 2000s was working as an espresso machine salesman for Gaggia in the high-end department store Selfridges. While working there, a chance encounter with a television producer led to him featuring on Trick or Treat, hosted by Derren Brown. In 2004, Hoffmann started his popular blog "Jimseven". Hoffmann later moved to another espresso machine manufacturer, La Spaziale, as the national training manager for the UK.

Hoffmann first started competing in the UK Barista Championship in 2005, winning the competition in 2006 and qualifying to compete in the World Barista Championship (WBC). He placed fifth at the WBC in 2006. He became the UK Barista Champion again in 2007 before becoming the World Barista Champion in Tokyo in 2007. His winning signature drink involved a "flavour marriage" of tobacco and almonds. Since becoming the World Barista Champion, Hoffmann has come to be regarded as a pioneer in the third-wave coffee movement in the UK, with The Globe and Mail describing him as "the godfather of London's coffee revolution".

=== Square Mile Coffee Roasters ===
After leaving his job at La Spaziale in May 2007, Hoffmann co-founded Square Mile Coffee Roasters with his business partner Anette Moldvaer in 2008, a London-based specialty coffee company and roaster. It was one of the first wholesale specialty coffee companies in London, and later became the largest. The 2008 World Barista champion, Stephen Morrissey, was sponsored by Square Mile, and in 2009 the winning beans also came from Square Mile. The company was based in Cambridge Heath in 2009 and Hackney by June 2014, before moving to their current location in Walthamstow in late 2018.

With his business partner Tim Williams, Hoffmann temporarily opened a coffee bar called "Penny University" in 2010 through Square Mile. The café was open in Shoreditch from May 22 to July 30 and featured no espresso drinks, opting to serve Hario V60 pour overs, flannel drip, and siphon coffee. Square Mile took over Prufrock Coffee, a café in London, in 2017.

Square Mile hosted the 2010 World AeroPress Championships, which took place alongside the 2010 World Barista Championship in London, and the 2015 English Aeropress Championships. Hoffmann competed in the 2010 Aeropress Championship.

Square Mile hosted a pop-up coffee shop during the 2016 London Coffee Festival. The pop-up included two stands, one of which taught attendees how to make good espresso and filter coffee at home, and the other offered a tasting experience of food and drink that highlighted coffee as an ingredient.

In 2022, Square Mile collaborated with Cometeer to produce flash frozen pucks of concentrated coffee, which are then diluted in hot water as an alternative to instant coffee. This was the first time Square Mile's coffee was available in the US. This was followed in September 2022, when Square Mile and American specialty coffee company Fellow announced the roaster would partner with them for the September 13 "Fellow Drop", a weekly, text-based coffee ordering service. Fellow had collaborated with US Barista Champion and fellow YouTuber Morgan Eckroth the month prior.

As of September 2022, Square Mile had 37 employees.

In June 2025, Square Mile and Bellwether Coffee previewed “Heza Hills,” a Burundi coffee, at the World of Coffee Geneva trade show. A broader Heza Hills release was scheduled for 2 July 2025.

=== Writing ===
On 23 October 2014, Hoffmann published The World Atlas of Coffee through Octopus Book Publishing Group. The book explores coffee history, varieties, growing methods, roasting, and preparation with a focus on origin, cataloguing the coffees grown in 29 countries. The book was a commercial success, selling 320,000 copies, including a second edition in 2018 and translation editions in eight languages. The book was also critically well-received, with The Guardian describing the book as "high geekery made palatable by the evident love pulsing through every sentence."

In 2017, Hoffmann self-published his second book, Best of Jimseven, funded through an Indiegogo campaign. The book was a compilation of Hoffmann's popular blog "Jimseven".

In 2022, Hoffmann published his third book, How to Make the Best Coffee at Home through Mitchell Beazley, a part of Octopus Book Publishing Group. In January 2023, the book was honored at the 14th Annual Sprudgie Awards, winning in the category of "Best Coffee Magazine/Book".

=== YouTube channel ===
Since 2016, Hoffmann has gained popularity on YouTube, garnering over 2.5 million subscribers. His channel primarily discusses the specialty coffee industry, reviews and compares coffee equipment, and evaluates different brewing methods. His videos are noted as being practical, easy to understand, and funny, as well as consistently thorough. Hoffmann's distinct personal fashion is also often noted as being part of the channel's appeal, with The Guardian describing the videos' style as "gentle chaos – with a widow's peak of expertly swooped silver hair, tortoiseshell spectacles, a penchant for woolly jumpers, and a soft voice. But he's not afraid to strain doughnuts into coffee or brew grounds in a bripe – a coffee pipe."

Hoffmann uses the crowd-funding subscription service site Patreon to support his channel, making £16,000 (US$21,917.81) a month from more than 8,000 patrons in July 2021 and US$24,000 as of January 2022. He uses some of these funds to purchase products to review, a practice intended to allow him to remain impartial. He shoots his videos primarily in his studio, which includes a kitchen and an office.

In November 2022, the channel was nominated at that year's Streamy Awards in the category of Cinematography. In January 2023, Hoffmann was honored at the 14th Annual Sprudgie Awards, winning runner-up in the category of "Best Coffee Video/Film".

=== Other businesses, consulting work, and products ===
In 2014, Hoffmann co-founded Longberry Publishing with Ben Szobody and Jacob Forrest. The company published a magazine they stated would be an "occasional journal of coffee" available in print and e-book. The company was closed in 2018 after publishing two editions.

In 2015, Hoffmann collaborated with ChefSteps and Ben Kaminsky to make a twelve-part series on coffee and coffee preparation. The producers of the series were nominated for a James Beard Award for their how-to videos, including the series with Hoffmann.

Hoffmann founded Tens Hundreds Thousands, which sells limited edition coffee-related products.

Hoffmann has worked with Italian commercial espresso machine and grinder maker Victoria Arduino, owned by Nuova Simonelli, since 2013. The collaboration has resulted in the Mythos One coffee grinder in 2013, the Black Eagle VA388 espresso machine in 2015, and the Eagle One espresso machine in 2020. The Black Eagle focused on simplicity of design, while the Mythos One and Eagle One focused on environmental friendliness and reducing waste for coffee businesses.

Hoffmann consulted for Myracle Kitchen, a subsidiary of Nurture Brands LLC, to develop a plant-based dairy alternative called "Barista Mylk". The product was released in June 2021, with the stated goal of being comparable to cow's milk in terms of taste, experience, and texture, as well as being suitable for use in latte art. The formulation includes oats, fava beans, and coconut cream.

== Bibliography ==
- The World Atlas of Coffee. Richmond Hill, Ontario: Firefly Books. 2014. ISBN 978-1-77085-470-3.
- The Best of Jimseven 2004-2015. 2017.
- How to Make the Best Coffee at Home. London: Mitchell Beazley. 2022. ISBN 978-1-78472-724-6.
