= Parisi Coffee =

American coffee company

- Trade name: Parisi Coffee, Parisi Artisan Coffee
- Industry: Coffee roasting, coffeehouse, food distribution
- Founded: May 2006; 20 years ago
- Founders: Joseph Paris, Salvatore Paris, Anthony Paris
- Headquarters: Kansas City, Missouri, U.S.
- Area served: United States
- Key people: Joe Paris (president, Paris Brothers)
- Products: Coffee, espresso beverages, cold brew
- Parent: Paris Brothers, Inc.
- Website: parisicoffee.com

Parisi Coffee, which also operates under the trade name Parisi Artisan Coffee, is an American specialty coffee roaster and café operator based in Kansas City, Missouri. It is a division of Paris Brothers, Inc., a family-owned food and beverage company founded in 1983 by brothers Joseph, Salvatore, and Anthony Paris.

Paris Brothers had distributed allied coffee products such as syrups and pastries since the late 1980s, but did not handle coffee beans until 2006, when it opened green coffee warehousing at its Kansas City headquarters and began roasting under the Parisi name at a facility on Southwest Boulevard. The company opened its first retail café at Union Station in 2011 and has since added locations elsewhere in the Kansas City metropolitan area, including Kansas City International Airport.

Parisi received national attention in specialty coffee in 2013, when its quality assurance manager, Pete Licata, won the World Barista Championship using coffee roasted by the company.

== History ==
=== Background and entry into coffee ===
Paris Brothers, Inc. traces its origins to 1983, when the Paris brothers started a wholesale gourmet popcorn business called Sally Jo's Popcorn in Kansas City. The company expanded over subsequent decades into specialty food distribution, warehousing, and logistics.

In May 2006, Paris Brothers began offering green coffee storage at its 400,000-square-foot headquarters in the Hunt Midwest SubTropolis, an underground business complex in Kansas City, and started roasting its own specialty coffee at a renovated 20,000-square-foot building on Southwest Boulevard. Company executives said one motivation was the absence of a green coffee inventory hub in the Midwest, as the principal storage centers were located on the coasts, raising costs for inland buyers.

The coffee subsidiary, then known as Parisi Artisan Roasted, produced an estimated 50,000 to 75,000 pounds of coffee in its first year and supplied Kansas City accounts including the Hilton President Hotel, Hotel Phillips, and the New Theatre Restaurant. The brand's Italian styling reflects the founding family's Sicilian heritage.

=== Retail distribution and certification ===
Parisi Artisan Coffee entered warehouse club retail in 2007, when it was first sold at Costco, and began appearing in Kansas City–area Sam's Club stores in the fall of 2009. Beans were held in an 80,000-square-foot storage facility in the SubTropolis, which the company described as the only climate-controlled certified organic coffee warehouse in the United States.

In 2008, Paris Brothers established Eco World Family Farm, an in-house certification program intended to combine the criteria of fair trade and USDA organic certification with additional requirements for cup quality.

=== Cafés ===
Parisi opened its first retail café at Union Station in Kansas City in 2011, joining a tenant mix that included Pierpont's and the Rocky Mountain Chocolate Factory. The café became the company's flagship location. By late 2013 the company operated two cafés in the metropolitan area, the Union Station location and one at the Park Place development in Leawood, Kansas; both served drinks made with house-made syrups.

The company later opened a café at the Argosy Casino Hotel & Spa and, after several years in Leawood, relocated its Johnson County location to downtown Overland Park, Kansas. In September 2022, Kansas City aviation officials named Parisi Coffee among the concessions tenants for the new $1.5 billion single terminal at Kansas City International Airport, which opened on February 28, 2023. In coverage of a public open house held before the opening, The Kansas City Star described Parisi as one of the familiar Kansas City names among the terminal's food and beverage operators, alongside Boulevard Brewing Company.

=== COVID-19 pandemic ===
During the COVID-19 pandemic, Paris Brothers temporarily closed the Parisi cafés and redeployed staff to a new consumer grocery delivery service, combining Parisi Coffee's existing e-commerce platform with the parent company's warehouse and distribution network. The company, which then employed about 250 people, said the effort allowed it to avoid layoffs.

=== Leadership transition and repositioning ===
In November 2025, Joe Paris, son of co-founder Joseph Paris, was named president of Paris Brothers, with his father and uncle Salvatore moving to the board. The company reported that it had doubled revenue over the preceding two years after divesting its freight-forwarding, deli distribution, and cheese processing operations and that its workforce had grown to roughly 200.

Paris said he intended to position Parisi as a national high-end coffee brand, and the company made several senior hires for the coffee business, including head roaster Adam Ross, previously of PT's Coffee, and David Amos as vice president of wholesale sales. Paris Brothers also launched a two-year apprenticeship program at its roasting facility in partnership with Metropolitan Community College.

In February 2026, the company announced a seven-year lease for a 16,000-square-foot corporate headquarters at 13th Street and Baltimore Avenue in the Kansas City Power & Light District, to include coffee laboratories, sensory evaluation space, and a test kitchen.

== Operations ==
Parisi roasts coffee in small batches on drum roasters at its Kansas City production facility near the Crossroads Arts District. The company sells packaged coffee through grocery and specialty retailers, supplies wholesale and private-label accounts, operates an online store, and runs its own cafés.

Parisi is one of several brands in the Paris Brothers portfolio, alongside Mother Earth Coffee, Cervasi, Luigi's Pasta Sauce, and Margarita's Salsa. Its product line includes single-origin coffees and blends such as the Kansas City Breakfast Blend and Bravissimo, as well as whiskey barrel–conditioned coffees.

== Competition and recognition ==
Pete Licata, Parisi's quality assurance manager, won the United States Barista Championship in April 2013, having also taken the title in 2011. A Kansas City–area native, Licata first worked as a barista while a student in the Kansas City area and later served as director of coffee quality for a Hawaiian café chain from January 2009, before returning to the region and joining Parisi in November 2012. He won the South Central regional competition, held in Kansas City in January 2013, and advanced to the national final in Boston, where 47 competitors each gave a 15-minute performance preparing four espressos, four cappuccinos, and four servings of an original signature drink for a panel of sensory and technical judges. His responsibilities at Parisi spanned green coffee sourcing, roasting at the Kansas City plant, and the beverage program at the company's two cafés, and the company bought competition-grade equipment for his practice sessions. Co-founder Joseph Paris, then a vice president of Paris Brothers, compared the win to a neighborhood child succeeding and said it formed part of the company's development as a coffee business.

The following month Licata won the World Barista Championship in Melbourne, Australia, becoming the second American to hold the world title. The first was Michael Phillips of Intelligentsia Coffee in Chicago, who won the 2010 championship in London. Licata's competition routine used a Colombian coffee grown by Arnulfo Leguizamo in the Huila Department and roasted by John Welsh at Parisi. The non-alcoholic coffee cocktail he created for the judges combined chilled palm sugar syrup and an espresso shot served over ice with non-alcoholic bitters flavored with orange peel and lemongrass; it was subsequently sold at Parisi cafés. Parisi's Dean Kallivrousis placed fourth at the 2013 United States Brewers Cup.

In November 2013, Fodor's named Parisi Café to a list of America's 15 best independently owned coffee shops, a selection that also included Intelligentsia Coffee, Stumptown Coffee Roasters, and Victrola Coffee Roasters.

Parisi has been cited in coverage of Kansas City's coffee scene. Readers of Travel + Leisure ranked the city seventh among American coffee cities in 2014, with Parisi named among the local shops noted. In 2015, The Daily Meal placed Kansas City sixth on a list of the ten best cities for coffee in America, and coffee journalist Erin Meister singled out Parisi alongside Oddly Correct, Quay Coffee, and The Roasterie. That same year, Feast magazine named Parisi runner-up for best large coffee roaster in Kansas City in its Feast 50 awards.

== Partnerships ==
In early 2020, Parisi became the official coffee and cold brew of Sporting Kansas City of Major League Soccer and the preferred specialty foods provider for the club's in-house catering operation, with products sold at Children's Mercy Park. In 2021 the company released Il Mentore, an espresso blend developed with Sporting Kansas City manager Peter Vermes as part of its Tifosi Series.

Parisi coffee was served at Union Station during the 2023 NFL draft, which the venue hosted in April of that year.

== See also ==
- Third-wave coffee in the United States
- Coffee culture
