= Blue Tokai Coffee Roasters =

Indian coffee company

- Industry: Coffee Industry
- Founded: 2012
- Founder: Namrata Asthana, Matt Chitharanjan, and Shivam Shahi
- Headquarters: Gurugram, Haryana
- Number of locations: 261 outlets (2026)
- Area served: India
- Products: Specialty coffee; Artisanal & Handcrafted Bakes; All Day Meals
- Parent: Muhavra Enterprises Private Limited
- Website: https://bluetokaicoffee.com/

Blue Tokai Coffee Roasters (pronounced as blu-tou-kai) is an Indian coffee company headquartered in Gurugram, Haryana. It was founded in 2012 as a coffee chain that sources, roasts and sells single-origin estate-grown Indian coffee through Cafes, E-commerce, B2B channels, Retail Shops & Quick Commerce.

Blue Tokai works directly with over 80 estates and small farm holders across India who grow coffee in a biodiverse environment. Blue Tokai also claims that their coffee species are climate resilient. Blue Tokai directly buys beans from estates and roasts the beans itself.

== History ==
Blue Tokai was founded in Gurugram in 2012 by Matt Chitharanjan and Namrata Asthana. Chitharanjan, originally from the United States, previously worked in economic and real estate consulting and international development before co-founding the company. Later Shivam Shahi joined the company as co-founder. In 2015, brand started their first roastery cum cafe cum office in Champa Gali, Delhi.

According to the founder, the venture began as a bootstrapped experiment with an initial investment of approximately Rs.10 lakhs, after the couple (Matt Chitharanjan and Namrata Asthana) moved to Delhi and began roasting coffee out of a room in Asthana's parents' home in New Delhi. The idea grew out of the observation that despite India being a major coffee producer with high quality beans that are exported, domestic markets are left with instant or generic coffee.

Blue Tokai opened Mumbai's first cafe-cum-roastery in 2016 at Mahalaxmi.

In 2017, Blue Tokai in partnership with Bahrisons Booksellers opened a cafe inside the bookstore in Delhi. Blue Tokai opened it's another cafe cum bookstore with Baharisons in Chandigarh.

The company initially operated as D2C online retailer and B2B supplier before it opened cafes to offer a "coffee experience".

== Operations & growth ==
Blue Tokai is operating in India's growing speciality coffee segment along with Third Wave Coffee Roasters, Slay Coffee, Rage Coffee, and Seven Beans Co.

In April 2026, the company opened its 4th Origins store at Banjara Hills, Hyderabad, Telangana.

=== Funding ===
Blue Tokai has raised $113 million in funding in 13 rounds with a total valuation of $235 million, as of 2025.

Year	Round	Amount	Lead investor(s)
2020	Early stage/ angel	~Rs. 40 crore	Angel investors
August 2021	Pre-series B bridge	Rs. 17 crore	Anicut Angel Fund
January 2023	Series B	$30 million	A91 Partners, White Whale Ventures
August 2024	Series C	$35 million	Verlinvest, with ChrysCapital
September 2025	Bridge round	$25 milliom	A91 Partners, Anicut, Verlinvest, 12 Flags

=== 2026 Delhi Protest ===
The Fifth Origins outlet was opened at Janpath, New Delhi, and subsequently gained fame during the 2026 Delhi Jantar Mantar protests, when the store provided free meals and shelter to protesters.

== International expansion ==
As of 2026, it operates over 261 outlets including 20 Indian Metropolitan & Heritage cities.

=== Japan ===
In 2021, Blue Tokai entered into Japan and opened its 1st outlet at Hiroo, Shibuya. Blue Tokai has hosted pop-up events in Tokyo and stated an intent to expand into international markets including Japan and UAE.

=== UAE ===
In 2026, it entered into the UAE & GCC market through a partnership with Amrbosia Golf which is part of Amrbosia Goods Group. Blue Tokai opened it's cafe at Bur Juman Mall & Damac Hills.

== Coffee farms ==
Blue Tokai sources its coffee from Indian coffee farms, namely Attikan Estate, Thogarihunkal Estate, Ratnagiri Estate, Harley Estate and others.
