= Baristas (film) =

- Film poster
- Directed by: Rock Baijnauth
- Cinematography: Robert Kraetsch, Roger Singh
- Production company: Filmic Entertainment
- Distributed by: The Orchard
- Release date: 2 April 2019
- Running time: 98 minutes
- Country: United States
- Language: English

Baristas is a 2019 documentary directed by Rock Baijnauth and produced by Filmic Entertainment. It is executive produced by Phil Cha and was the last film to be distributed by The Orchard before the company rebranded to 1091 Media.

Baristas is the follow-up to the documentary Barista which was distributed by Samuel Goldwyn Films. The documentary follows four passionate national barista champions from different parts of the globe who struggle to prove themselves as they represent their country and their craft, in an effort to win the 2017 World Barista Championship in Seoul, South Korea.

The featured baristas are Miki Suzuki, a three-time Japanese Barista Champion (2010, 2011, 2016), Kyle Ramage, the 2017 United States Barista Champion, Niall Wynn, the 2017 Irish Barista Champion, who experiences synesthesia that influences his approach to coffee tasting, and Chloe Jess Nattrass, the 2017 German Barista Champion, who was born in Australia.

Baristas was filmed in five countries: Japan, Ireland, South Korea, Germany, and the United States and was produced by Rock Baijnauth, Phil Cha, Roger Singh, Ramona Serletic, Jawad Mir, Rita Su, and George Nikitaras.

The film released globally on iTunes on 2 April 2019. The DVD premiere was on May 7, 2019 and there was a screening at the Isabel Bader Theatre, in Toronto, Ontario, Canada on August 30, 2019.
