= Cometeer Coffee =

American specialty coffee retailer

Cometeer, Inc.
- Company type: Private
- Industry: Food and beverage industry, technology, specialty coffee
- Genre: Coffee
- Predecessor: Bevrada, Meltz
- Founded: 2015 in Massachusetts
- Founder: Matthew Roberts and Douglas Hoon
- Fate: Active
- Headquarters: Gloucester, Massachusetts
- Number of locations: 1 (2023)
- Area served: United States, lower 48 states
- Products: Flash frozen coffee capsules
- Brands: Cometeer Coffee
- Services: Coffee subscription service
- Number of employees: 160 (2022)
- Website: cometeercoffee.com

Cometeer Coffee is an American coffee technology and manufacturing company based in Gloucester, Massachusetts. The brand uses brewing technology and flash-freezes it using liquid nitrogen for preservation.

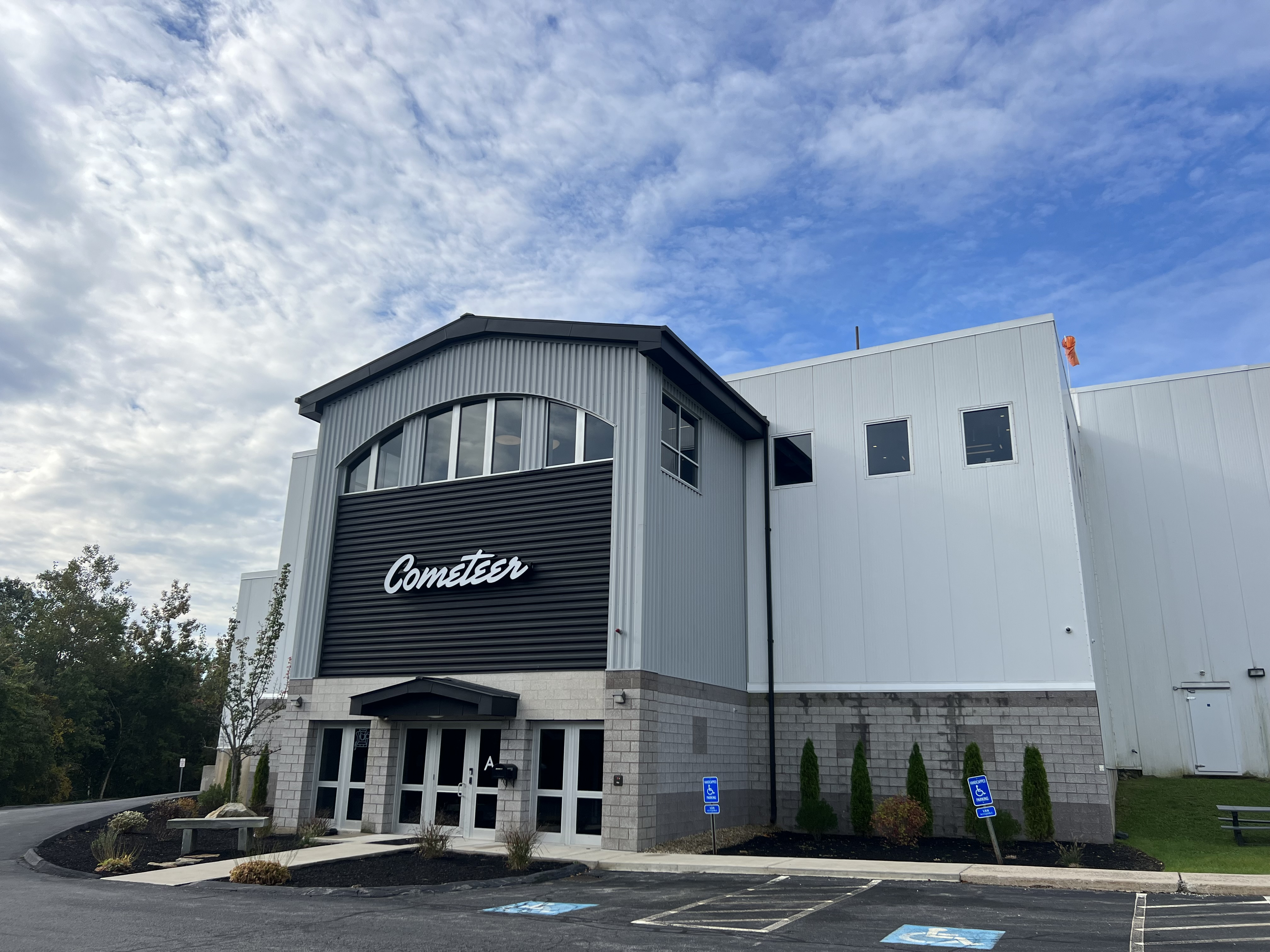
The headquarters of Cometeer coffee company in Gloucester, Massachusetts.

The company's primary product is single-serve flash-frozen coffee capsules, but it also offers a subscription service that delivers frozen capsules to customers regularly.

== History ==
=== Founding ===
Cometeer was co-founded in 2015 by CEO Matthew Roberts after developing the initial concept while studying abroad in Spain while attending Bentley University. He developed the idea for Cometeer after struggling to make a consistent coffee profile at home. His workaround of freezing coffee in ice trays inspired him, and he began experimenting with improving this method. George Howell, a specialty coffee expert, was an early collaborator for the business after Roberts proved his ability to flash-freeze and preserve the freshness of espresso shots using blocks of dry ice.

Shortly after Howell's endorsement, Douglas Hoon, the company's CTO, co-founder, and an MIT-trained engineer, partnered with Roberts and other engineers and chemists to develop precision coffee brewing systems and flash-freezing.

=== Launch ===
In 2019, the company launched its line of flash-frozen coffee capsules at the Specialty Coffee Association of America expo and won best new product.

In 2021, the company built and scaled its manufacturing from a renovated seafood processing factory.

The company is known for using its cryogenic patented coffee processing methods as a platform to partner with roasters considered part of the third-wave coffee movement, including Counter Culture Coffee, Intelligentsia Coffee & Tea, and Square Mile, the roasting company of James Hoffmann.

In February 2024, Houseplant, a home goods and lifestyle company co-founded by Seth Rogen and Evan Goldberg, partnered with Cometeer to launch a new line of coffee. Houseplant wants to expand into new product categories beyond cannabis-related items while highlighting the co-founders' connection to coffee culture.

=== Name of company ===
Cometeer derives its name from the portmanteau of the words comet and pioneer. Comets are balls of frozen liquids and gasses hurtling through space.

=== Investors ===
The company has raised over $100M from investors, including founders of tech companies and institutional investors.

=== Awards ===
- Cometeer was named one of TIME Magazine's best inventions in 2022.
- Cometeer was voted the best coffee subscription service in the United States for 2023 from USA Today 10Best.
