= Morgan Eckroth =

American barista and content creator

- Born: September 18, 1998 (age 28)
- Education: Oregon State University
- Occupations: Barista; TikToker; YouTuber

TikTok information
- Page: morgandrinkscoffee
- Followers: 6.1 million

YouTube information
- Channel: MorganDrinksCoffee
- Years active: 2020-present
- Subscribers: 1.45 million
- Views: 483 million
- Last updated: 24 June 2026
- Website: morgandrinkscoffee.com

Morgan Eckroth (born 18 September 1998), also known by their (Note: Eckroth uses they/she pronouns. This article uses "they" pronouns for consistency.) username MorganDrinksCoffee, is an American online content creator and barista. A resident of Portland, Oregon, Eckroth maintains a popular TikTok account and YouTube channel along with participating in barista competitions. After competing in nationals and qualifiers for the United States Barista Championship in 2019 and 2020 respectively, Eckroth became the United States Barista Champion in 2022, thereby qualifying to represent the US in the 2022 World Barista Championship (WBC). Eckroth placed second at the WBC, where they were sponsored by Onyx Coffee Lab, an Arkansas-based coffee roaster where Eckroth also serves as the content marketing specialist. In 2026, Eckroth released their first book, titled Coffee, for Here: The Ultimate Handbook for At-Home Coffee Enthusiasts.

== Education and career ==
Eckroth attended Oregon State University where, after starting in criminology and criminal justice, they received a marketing degree in June 2020. As a college freshman they started working as a barista at Tried and True Coffee Co. in Corvallis. They began releasing short form comedy sketches about life as a barista on TikTok. They then expanded to Instagram and YouTube, where they maintain popular accounts on both platforms. Eckroth brands themself as "your friendly internet barista", saying, "[Coffee] can be serious or silly or everything in between all at once. We can't expect consumers outside the specialty coffee industry to find connection with us if we approach them with the expectation that they have the same foundation of knowledge we do".

After graduating, they started work at a start-up, before returning to work as a barista to allow them to continue making coffee-related content. They stated in an interview with Business Insider, "Previously, so many of my videos revolved around me actively being a barista and actively working in a café. It felt a little disingenuous to go back to that sort of thing without actually working in the industry. And so I found a wonderful café up in Portland that was looking for a part-time barista, and to this day, I still work three shifts a week." They continue to work part time as a barista as of December 2022. Eckroth typically films their videos at the coffee shop they work at after it has closed.

In December 2020, Eckroth announced a collaboration with Wrecking Ball Coffee Roasters, selling branded coffee from Eckroth's online shop.

In 2019 and 2020, Eckroth competed in the United States Barista Championship (USBC), competing in nationals and qualifiers respectively those years. In 2022, Eckroth again competed and finished first. Eckroth became the USBC Champion and qualified to represent the United States in the World Barista Championship (WBC) in Melbourne, Australia. Leading up to the competition, Eckroth prepared for two months with Onyx Coffee Lab from Arkansas and was coached by Onyx co-founder and fellow YouTuber Lance Hedrick. Eckroth's performance at the competition discussed livestreaming and the connection between the online and physical world as it pertains to coffee culture. Eckroth also released a video series leading up to the competition detailing their preparation and a recipe on how to make their signature drink.

Eckroth officially joined Onyx Coffee Lab as their content marketing specialist in May 2022.

In August 2022, Eckroth and specialty coffee company Fellow announced Eckroth would act as a guest curator for the August 30 "Fellow Drop", a weekly, text-based coffee ordering service.

Starting on 28 September 2022, Eckroth competed in the opening round of the WBC. Eckroth was sponsored by Onyx Coffee Lab, marking the second year in a row the US was represented by an Onyx-sponsored competitor in the WBC, as well as in the World Brewers Cup. After progressing past the first round and semifinals, Eckroth continued on to compete in the finals against five other baristas, placing second and becoming the Runner-Up of the World Barista Championship. A few months later, Eckroth announced they planned to continue competing in barista competitions. In 2023 and 2024, Eckroth finished runner up at the US Barista Championship. In June 2026, Eckroth returned to barista competition after taking 2025 off. They finished in fourth at the 2026 US edition.

In January 2023, Eckroth was honored at the 14th Annual Sprudgie Awards, winning in the category of "Best Social Media".

In October 2026, Eckroth released their first book, titled Coffee, for Here: The Ultimate Handbook for At-Home Coffee Enthusiasts. It contains recipes for coffee drinks, a personal account of their time competing at barista championships, and information on the history and agriculture of coffee.

== Personal life ==
Morgan Eckroth grew up in Corvallis, Oregon. They were homeschooled alongside their brother. Eckroth now lives in Portland, Oregon, with their husband. In a June 2021 post on Instagram, Eckroth stated they are bisexual and uses the pronouns "she" and "they".

In May 2020, Eckroth was attacked with bear mace at their job after a customer became angry about the coffee shop's temporary no-cash policy during the onset of the COVID-19 pandemic in the United States.
