= Pete Licata =

American barista, 2013 World Barista Champion

Pete Licata is an American barista and coffee consultant who won the World Barista Championship in Melbourne, Australia, in May 2013, while working as quality assurance manager at Parisi Coffee in Kansas City, Missouri. He had won the United States Barista Championship the previous month, in April 2013, having also taken the national title in 2011.

Licata began working in coffee in 2003 at PT's Coffee in Kansas City while studying linguistics at university; he has said that a workshop there with Tim Wendelboe, who won the World Barista Championship the following year, prompted him to pursue coffee professionally. He began competing in 2005 and finished second at the 2011 World Barista Championship in Bogotá.

In 2024, Licata and his wife, Maria Licata, founded Caffeine Control Coffee, a Melbourne-based roastery selling blends at graduated caffeine levels, produced by combining single-lot caffeinated and decaffeinated coffees.
