= Specialty Coffee Association of Indonesia =

The Specialty Coffee Association of Indonesia (SCAI) is a trade association that represents stakeholders of Indonesia coffee Industry (farmers, processors, roasters, baristas, traders, exporters, cafes, coffee equipments, retailers as well as government and private institutions of Coffea arabica in Indonesia). The organization was founded in 2007 and as of October 2020 have more than 800 active members. "Excellence in Diversity" is the motto for SCAI, due to the facts Indonesia may have the most variety of coffee in the world and also representing its members that comes from very diverse background but shares same idealism on how to develop Indonesia coffee industry.

== Indonesian coffee production ==
Indonesia is the fourth largest exporter of coffee in the world, with production of 648.000 metric tons (10.8 million bags) of coffee in 2017 (ICO Monthly Coffee Market Report December 2017). Of this total, around 70% exported and the rest were consumed domestically. Of the exports, 25% are Coffea arabica and the balance is Coffea canephora. The specialty coffee market is the best opportunity for growth in Indonesia's coffee industry. In the U.S., specialty coffee has increased its market share from 1% to 20% in the last 25 years. Also, because of the uniqueness of the taste of Indonesian Robusta (Coffea Canephora), popularity of Indonesian Fine Robusta is rising among coffee aficionados. Farmers are now set aside their red picked coffee cherries to be processed in more elaborate method. Their efforts will be rewarded by the exceptional flavor that yields premium price.

== Activities of SCAI ==
SCAI members export 45% of Indonesia's Arabica coffee. The value of this coffee is more than $65 million, based on an average Free On Board price for Indonesia specialty coffee of $3,200 per metric ton. More than 8,000 Indonesian farmers have joined SCAI through their cooperatives. Coffee retailers who are members of SCAI are active in barista championships, as judges and participants. SCAI have the sanctions to send its best baristas to compete in the world championships.

Members are encouraged to participate in regular trainings (collaborates with international institutions), events (global ad domestic) and initiatives. 2017 marks the beginning of "Coffee for Earth" initiatives, whereby indigenous people around forest area are trained to plant coffee without damaging the environment. This is a collaboration of SCAI with government institutions (agriculture, forestry, land management, rural developments), research agencies and private sectors.

Arabica coffee from Indonesia has been an integral part of many coffee blends for hundreds of years. Mocha Java, which is a blend of Yemeni and Indonesian coffee, was developed in the 18th century. However, unscrupulous dealers are blending Indonesian coffee with lower priced coffee from other origins, confusing the marketplace. SCAI is part of the joint effort to end this practice by supporting the creation of geographical indications for Indonesia's Arabica coffee origins with other institutions. As of 2020 there are more than 30 Geographical Indication of Indonesian Coffee, additional areas will follow soon. Efforts to create Digital Teaceability are also underway. Combined with Blockchain technology, this will improve transparency and give more assurance to consumer of Kopi Indonesia.

SCAI is also working with institutions from other countries to improve the quality of Indonesia's specialty coffee. In July, 2008, SCAI hosted the Director of the Coffee Quality Institute (CQI), who provided training on quality certification of coffee. SCAI actively collaborates with key institutions in the coffee industry. In May, 2008, SCAI signed a Letter of understanding with the International Relations Council of the Specialty Coffee Association of America. In 2016 SCAI joined efforts of cooperation among ASEAN members in ACF (ASEAN Coffee Federation)

== See also ==
- Indonesian coffee
- Arabica coffee production in Indonesia
