= Onyx Coffee Lab =

American specialty coffee roaster and café company

- Type: Private
- Industry: Coffee roasting, coffeehouse, hospitality
- Founded: 2012
- Founders: Andrea Allen, Jon Allen
- Headquarters: Rogers, Arkansas, U.S.
- Area served: United States
- Key people: Andrea Allen; Jon Allen
- Products: Coffee, espresso beverages, baked goods, chocolate
- Website: onyxcoffeelab.com

Onyx Coffee Lab is an American specialty coffee roaster and café company based in Rogers, Arkansas. Founded in 2012 by Andrea Allen and Jon Allen, the company began in Springdale and expanded into a specialty coffee business that includes roasting, retail cafés, wholesale, e-commerce, and coffee education. As of April 2026, the company's Northwest Arkansas footprint includes its Rogers headquarters and roastery, cafés in Bentonville, Fayetteville, and Springdale, a café at the Momentary in Bentonville, and the related Doyenne Café concept in Bentonville.

== History ==
Andrea and Jon Allen founded Onyx Coffee Lab in 2012 in Springdale, Arkansas. Over the following decade, the company expanded from a local café business into a specialty coffee company with wholesale, online retail, and education operations.

In 2019, Onyx announced a move into a large headquarters space in downtown Rogers that combined a roastery, training lab, bakery, event space, offices, and green coffee storage. The move reflected the company's growth beyond a neighborhood coffee shop model into a vertically integrated specialty coffee business.

== Operations ==
Onyx Coffee Lab emphasizes traceability and transparency in coffee buying. According to the company, it publishes sourcing information for individual coffees, including pricing, scores, producer information, and related trade data. The company also states that it roasts and ships coffee daily from a facility powered in part by rooftop solar energy.

In addition to its retail cafés and online store, Onyx operates a wholesale division serving other hospitality businesses. Its Rogers headquarters functions as both a production site and an education and training space.

== Cafés and related concepts ==
Onyx's cafés are concentrated in Northwest Arkansas. Publicly listed locations include Rogers HQ, a downtown Bentonville café, the Gregg Avenue and Fay Square cafés in Fayetteville, the café at the Momentary in Bentonville, and a Springdale café on Emma Avenue.

In 2025, Onyx returned to Springdale with a three-story café and chocolate-focused concept in the former First Security Bank building on Emma Avenue. The site also became the headquarters for Terroir by Onyx, the company's in-house chocolate brand.

The company also operates or has operated related concepts such as Doyenne, a café and coffee program focused on coffees produced by women.

== Competition and awards ==
Onyx Coffee Lab gained national attention through barista competition. Andrea Allen won the 2020 U.S. Barista Championship.

In 2022, Morgan Eckroth won the U.S. Barista Championship and later finished as runner-up at the World Barista Championship, while Elika Liftee won the U.S. Brewers Cup and placed second at the World Brewers Cup. These placements further elevated the company's reputation within specialty coffee.

Onyx has also received recognition in roasting and product quality. Its public awards archive lists honors including the U.S. Roaster Championship, Good Food Awards, and recognition from Sprudge. One independently verifiable example is the company's 2021 Good Food Award for its Panama Lamastus Family coffee.

== Recognition ==
In 2025, Onyx Coffee Lab became a Certified B Corporation.

In 2026, Onyx Coffee Lab's Rogers location was named a finalist for the James Beard Foundation Award in the Outstanding Bar category. In the same year, Food & Wine reported that Onyx was ranked first on the World's 100 Best Coffee Shops list after placing second the year before.

== Legacy ==
Onyx Coffee Lab has been associated with the growth of specialty coffee culture in Arkansas and the broader American South. Commentators have cited the company's competition success, sourcing transparency, design-driven retail identity, and combination of cafés, roasting, wholesale, and education as factors in its prominence within American specialty coffee.
