= Filmic Entertainment =

American film studio

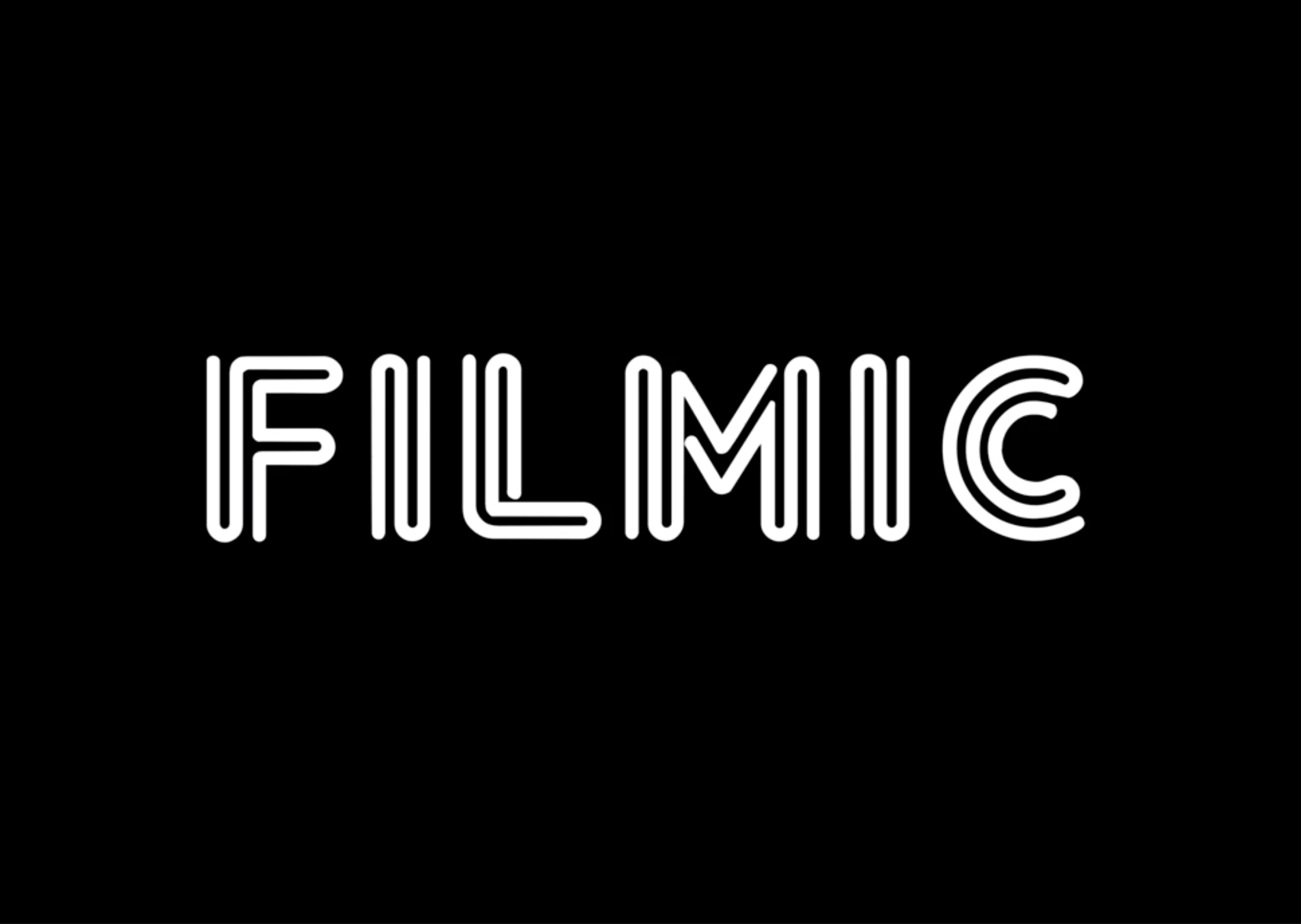
- Industry: Film
- Founded: 2011
- Headquarters: Los Angeles, California, United States
- Key people: Rock Baijnauth (CEO), Stephen Punwasi (COO)
- Services: Film production, television production
- Website: filmicentertainment.com

Filmic Entertainment is an American film studio, located in Los Angeles, California. The company specializes in the development and production of documentary films and series, having created films with HBO, Samuel Goldwyn Films, The Orchard, and 1091 Pictures.

== Filmography ==
Title	Year	Distribution
The Pirate Tapes	2011	HBO Documentary Films
Barista (film)	2015	Samuel Goldwyn Films
Baristas	2019	The Orchard
Untitled QuadrigaCX Documentary	TBA	Amazon Studios
