= Michael Phillips (barista) =

Coffee barista

Michael Phillips is a barista who won the United States Barista Championship in Portland, Oregon, in March 2009, while working at Intelligentsia Coffee & Tea in Chicago, IL. He also won the 2010 United States Barista Championship, becoming the second repeat U.S. champion. He has since become the first US Barista to win the World Barista Championship in London, England, in 2010.

At the March 2011 TED conferences (standing for Technology, Entertainment, Design) in California, Phillips was present at Coffee Common, a new organization with what was called "the unapologetically idealistic purpose to create a community with shared values."

In April 2011, Phillips resigned from his position as director of coffee education at Intelligentsia to help found the Handsome Coffee Roasters in Los Angeles, California, with Tyler Wells and Chris Owens. In 2014, Blue Bottle Coffee Company purchased Handsome Coffee Roasters.

Phillips was born in the United States and spent his early life in Royal Oak, Michigan.
