= The Book of Everlasting Things =

2022 novel by Aanchal Malhotra

- First edition cover
- Author: Aanchal Malhotra
- Publisher: Flatiron Books
- Publication date: 27 December 2022
- ISBN: 978-1-250-80201-9

The Book of Everlasting Things is a 2022 novel by Indian author and historian Aanchal Malhotra. It is her debut novel.

== Plot ==
The novel is the love story of Samir who is a Hindu perfumer and Firdaus who is a Muslim calligrapher in which their families torn apart during Partition of India.

== Background ==
Malhotra began writing the novel in 2017. It was partly inspired by a story she was told about her grandfather.

== Reception ==
The book was mostly well received, with critics praising its portrayal of the Partition of India and its consequences. It received some criticism for its characters and the repetitiveness of its story.

Donna Edwards of Associated Press wrote "The Book of Everlasting Things is deeply human, with careful attention paid to both factual and emotional accuracy." Shubhangi Tiwari of Scroll.in and Sreya Sarkar of India Today also praised the book's historical accuracy.

Reya Mehrotra of Financial Express wrote "a beautiful and whole love story entwined with separation". Darshita Goyal of Vogue India described it as "a beautifully visceral reminder that there were no sides in the partition."

Kushal Gulab of Deccan Chronicle gave the book a mixed review, praising its atmosphere but criticizing the flat characterization of the novel's protagonists.

Farooq Chaudhry of Chicago Review of Books found the book's exploration of trauma and the memory of the Partition, but wrote that its "the story can be unevenly paced and repetitive at times." Saudamini Jain of Hindustan Times similarly described parts of the novel as repetitive.
