= Aanchal Malhotra =

Indian author and historian (born 1990)

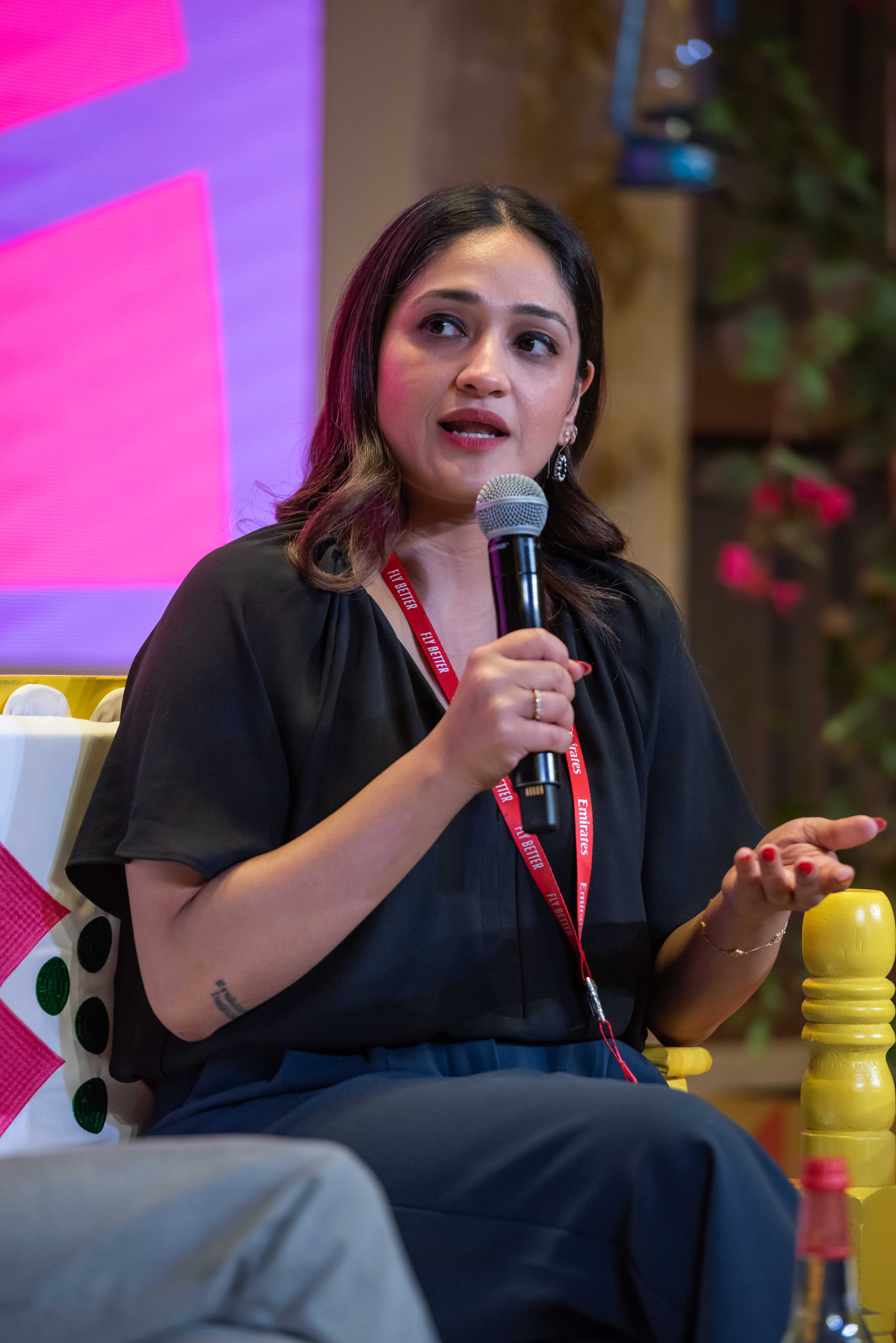
- Malhotra at a panel discussion at the Emirates Airline Festival of Literature 2024
- Born: 1990 (age 35–36); New Delhi, India
- Education: Ontario College of Art & Design; Concordia University
- Occupation: Author
- Writing career
- Genre: Indian history
- Notable work: The Book of Everlasting Things (2022); In the Language of Remembering (2022); Remnants of a Separation (2017); Remnants of Partition (2019)
- Website: aanchalmalhotra.com

Aanchal Malhotra (born 1990) is an Indian historian, author, and artist, known for her work on the 1947 Partition of India. Her research and writings focus on the oral histories of individuals affected by the Partition.

She is the author of the critically acclaimed books Remnants of a Separation and In the Language of Remembering.

== Early life and education ==
Aanchal Malhotra was born in New Delhi, India, in 1990, where she continues to live and work. She received a BFA degree in traditional printmaking and art history from OCAD University in Toronto, where she won the University Medal and the Sir Edmund Walker Award for Graduate Studies. She completed a MFA in Studio Art from Concordia University, Montréal. She belongs to the family of Bahrisons Booksellers, founded by her paternal grandfather, Balraj Bahri, in 1953 in New Delhi.

== Career ==
Malhotra's debut book Remnants of a Separation: A History of the Partition through Material Memory was published by HarperCollins India in 2017, to mark the 70th anniversary of Indian independence. The project (under the same name) initially began as her MFA dissertation at Concordia University and included field research in India, Pakistan, and England. It is a historical and anthropological attempt to revisit the Partition through personal and intimate objects that refugees carried with them across the border during their migration. It was named a Hindustan Times "India @ 70" book and shortlisted for the Sahitya Akademi Yuva Puraskar, Shakti Bhatt Prize First Book Award, Kamaladevi Chattopadhyay NIF Book Prize, and Hindu Lit for Life Non-Fiction Prize.

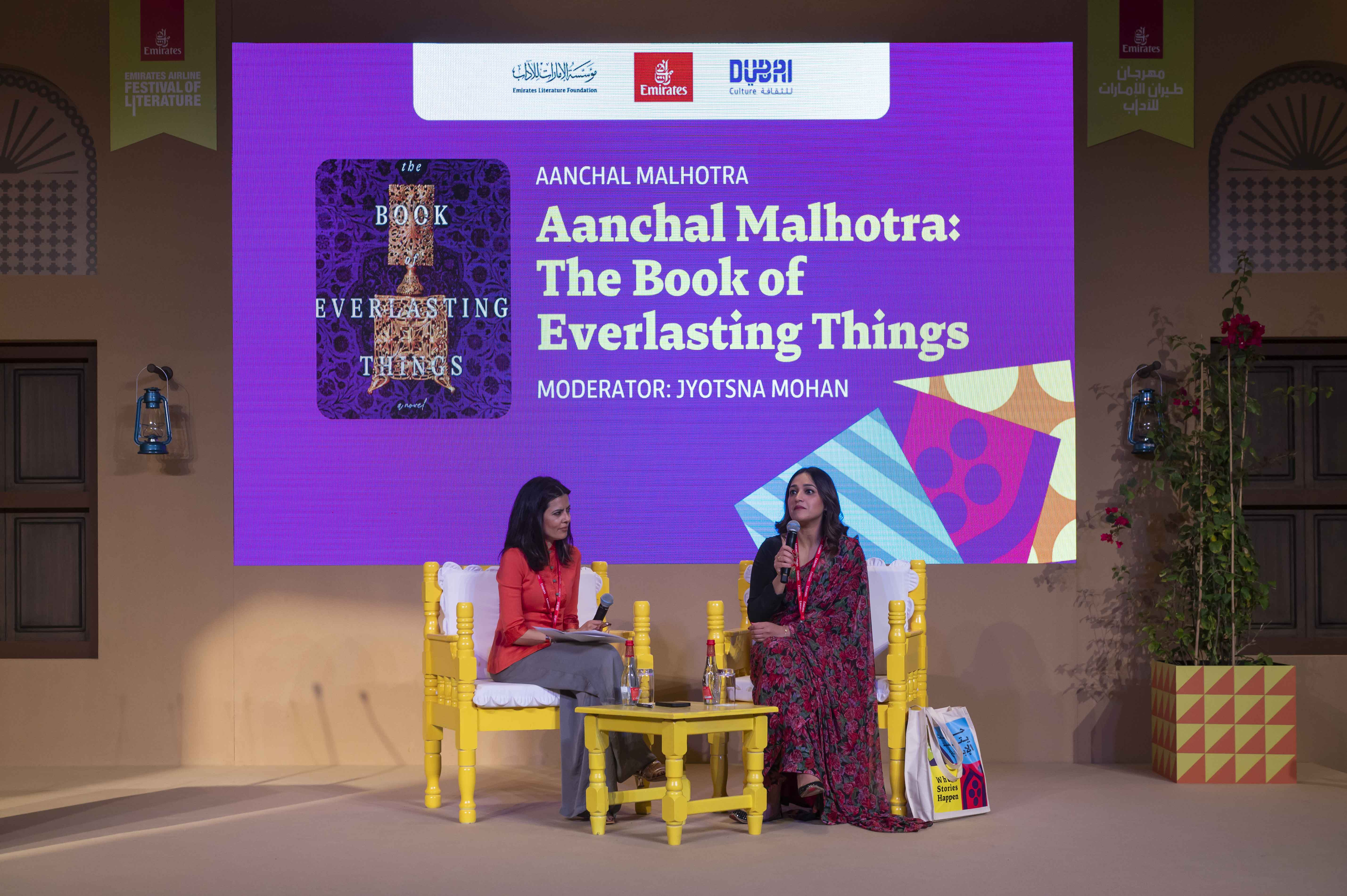
Aanchal Malhotra speaking at Emirates Airline Festival of Literature 2024.

Outside the Indian subcontinent, it was published under the title Remnants of Partition: 21 Objects from a Continent Divided by Hurst Publishers in 2019. It was shortlisted by the British Academy for the 2019 Nayef Al-Rodhan Prize for Global Cultural Understanding. In 2022, it won the United States Council for Museum Anthropology Book Prize, where the committee called it "a model for significant contributions to museum anthropology.”

To mark the 75th anniversary of Partition in 2022, Malhotra published a sequel titled, In the Language of Remembering: The Inheritance of Partition, which focused on the contemporary relevance of Partition in the everyday lives of Indians, Pakistanis, and Bangladeshis.

Her debut novel, The Book of Everlasting Things, was also published in 2022.

In addition to her books, she has been involved in several oral history projects and is an advisor the Project Dastaan peace initiative. In 2017, she co-founded the Museum of Material Memory, a crowdsourced digital repository tracing family history and social ethnography through heirlooms, collectibles, and objects of antiquity from the Indian subcontinent.

== Books ==
=== Non-fiction ===
- Remnants of a Separation: A History of Partition through Material Memory (2017) / Remnants of Partition: 21 Objects from a Continent Divided (2019)
- In the Language of Remembering: The Inheritance of Partition (2022)

=== Fiction ===
- The Book of Everlasting Things (2022)

=== Anthologies ===
- Looking Back: The 1947 Partition of India 70 Years On (Orient Black Swan, 2017)
- Departures in Critical Qualitative Research (University of California Press, 2019)
- India at 70: Multidisciplinary Approaches (Routledge, 2019)
- Our Freedoms: Essays and Stories from India's Best Writers (Juggernaut, 2021)
- The Book of Dog (HarperCollins India, 2022)

== Awards and honours ==
- 2017: Hindustan Times “India @70” book for Remnants of A Separation
- 2018: Tata Literature Live! First Book Award longlist for Remnants of A Separation
- 2022: Council for Museum Anthropology Book Prize for Remnants of Partition
- 2022: Valley of Words Prize for Hindi Translation for Yaadon ke Bikhre Moti
- 2022: GQ "Top 10 Indian non-fiction books of 2022" for In the Language of Remembering
- 2024: Chambre de Commerce et d'Industrie Franco-Indienne Literary Prize for Vestiges d’une Séparation
