= The Pirate Tapes =

- Directed by: Andrew Moniz; Rock Baijnauth
- Production companies: Palmira PDC, Telestro, Filmic Entertainment
- Distributed by: HBO Documentary Films (US)
- Release date: May 1, 2011 (Hot Docs International)
- Running time: 72 minutes
- Countries: Canada; Somalia
- Language: English

The Pirate Tapes is a documentary filmed by Somali-Canadian Mohamed Ashareh in Somalia and edited and produced by Palmira PDC in Canada. The film follows Ashareh, as he infiltrates a Somali pirate operation, giving a first person view of how they recruit and organize. The documentary premiered at the Hot Docs Canadian International Documentary Festival in 2011. It was picked up for distribution by HBO Documentary Films.

== The Plot ==
Ashareh lives undercover with pirates in Somalia for months during 2009, filming their activities with a small camera hanging around his neck. Some of the filming was done by a second cameraman. Ashareh was frequently in danger, and at one point they were both arrested and spent time in a Somali jail.

== Reception ==
The film has been heavily criticized for shortcomings attributed to Ashereh's lack of journalistic and filming experience. There has also been a dispute between Ashareh and Palmira PDC over the rights to the footage filmed by Ashereh. Andrew Moniz of Palmira PDC maintains the contracts "clearly" state Palmira would own the footage.
