= United States Barista Championship =

Annual coffee competition

The United States Barista Championship (USBC) is an annual American coffee-brewing competition designed to evaluate baristas on their skills in espresso-based drink preparation and service. Competitors prepare and serve three courses of espresso-based beverages consisting of straight espressos, milk beverages, and signature drinks. They are then scored on taste, presentation, and technical proficiency. The winner represents the United States at the World Barista Championship.

== Format ==
=== Qualifying ===
All USBC competitors must first qualify at a CoffeeChamps Qualifying Competition, which is an abbreviated version of the USBC. Two Qualifying Competitions are held each year, the top eighteen competitors from each Qualifying Competition move on to USBC. Places 7-18 move into Round One of USBC. The top six from each qualifying competition receive a bye into the semifinal round.

USBC consists of three rounds: Round One, Semi-Finals, and Finals. At the end of the first round, the competitors with the six highest scores advance to the semifinals round and join the twelve competitors who earned a bye from CoffeeChamps. Six competitors qualify for the finals and the champion is determined from this pool. The winner represents the United States in the World Barista Championship.

=== Presentation rules ===
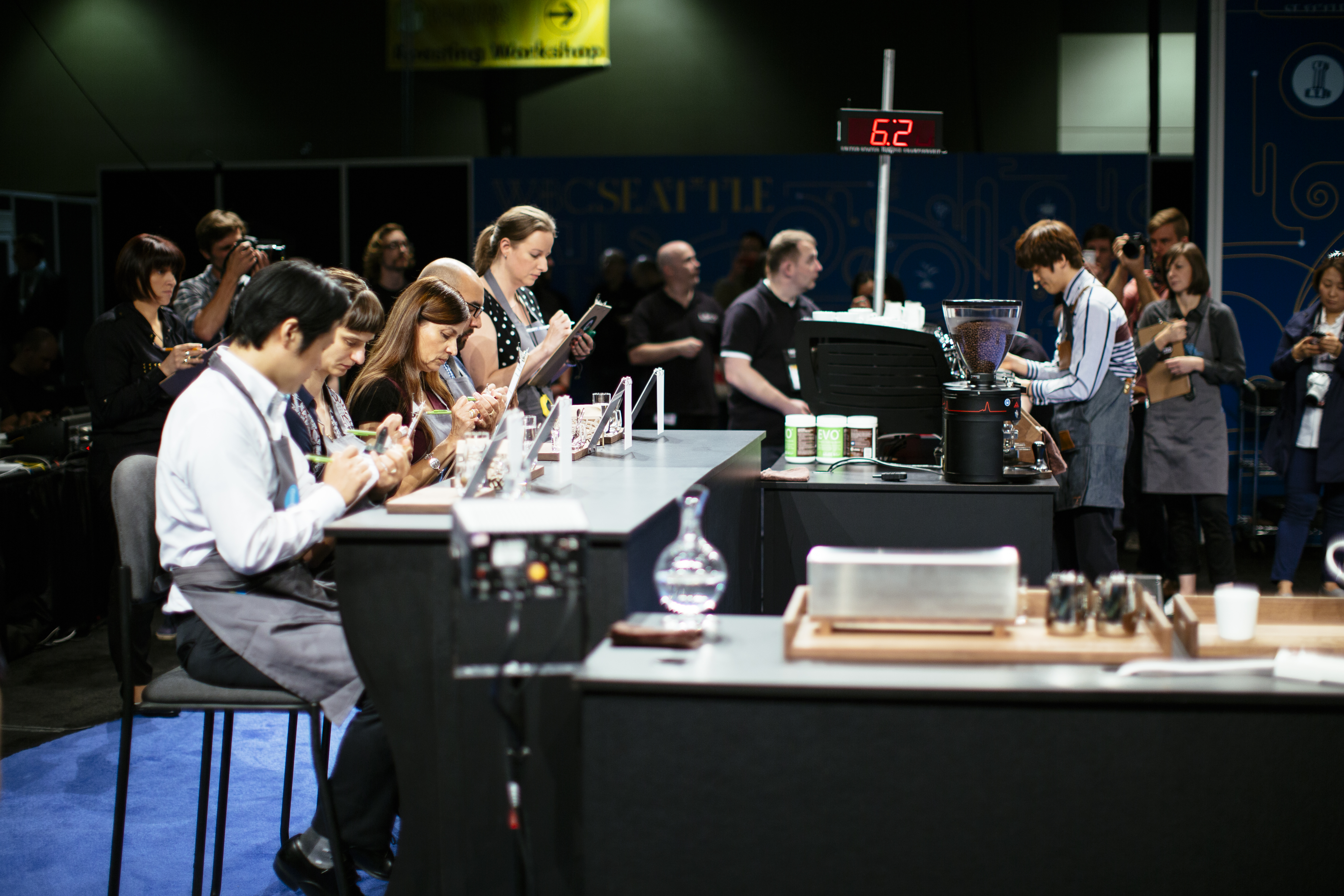
Barista Jong Hoon Lee preparing coffee at the 2015 World Barista Championships while several judges are taking notes

At the Qualifying Competitions, baristas serve two courses of espresso-based beverages consisting of espressos and signature drinks for two scoring sensory judges, two non-scoring guest judges or judges-in-training, two technical judges, and a head judge. There is a ten-minute time limit.

At the USBC, competitors must make three courses of beverages within a fifteen-minute time limit and are judged by seven different judges. The judging team consists of four sensory judges, two technical judges, and a head judge. The role of the sensory judge is to score the competitor solely on the quality of the beverage served and customer service. The technical judges are not served drinks, but score the competitor on items ranging from cleanliness to consistency of shot times. Judges undergo a certification process before the competition.

== History ==
The competition started in 2002 and was initially referred to as the North American Barista Competition. The 2021 edition of the competition was cancelled due to the effects of the COVID-19 pandemic.

In 2015, the competition was the subject of the documentary Barista, which followed competitors in the 2013 USBC.

=== Winners ===
Year	Winner
2002	Dismas Smith^{A}
2003	Heather Perry
2004	Bronwen Serna
2005	Phuong Tran
2006	Matt Riddle
2007	Heather Perry
2008	Kyle Glanville
2009	Michael Phillips
2010	Michael Phillips
2011	Pete Licata
2012	Katie Carguilo
2013	Pete Licata
2014	Laila Ghambari
2015	Charles Babinski
2016	Lemuel Butler
2017	Kyle Ramage
2018	Cole McBride
2019	Samantha Spillman
2020	Andrea Allen
2022	Morgan Eckroth
2023	Isaiah Sheese
2024	Frank La

^A In its inaugural year the competition was known as the North American Barista Competition. Dismas Smith was the 2002 NABC champion.

== See also ==
- World Barista Championship
