= Signature drink =

Any unique or original cocktail drink

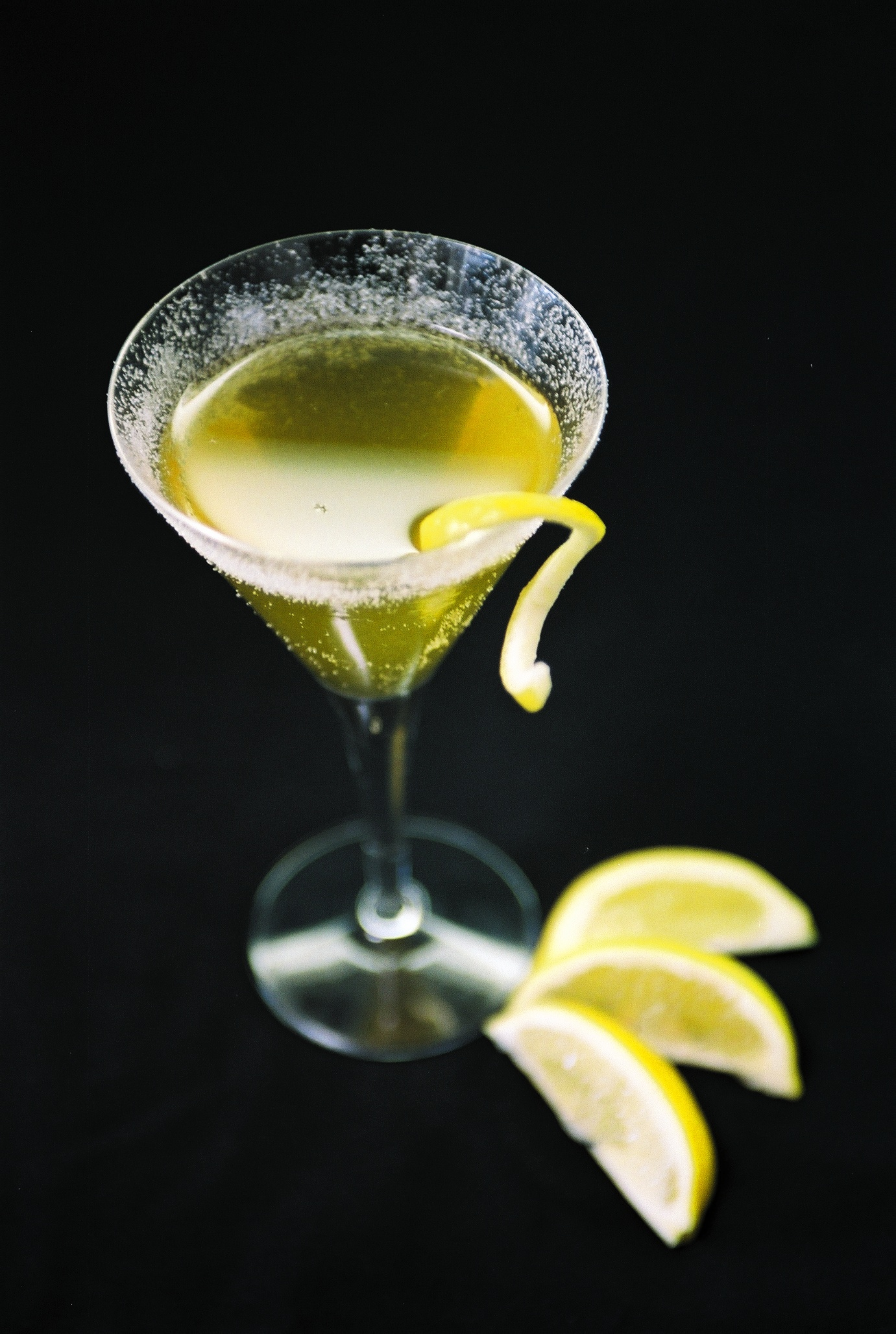
A lemon-inspired cocktail

A Signature drink is any unique or original drink that expresses the nature of the person or establishment creating it.

Signature drinks often incorporate local ingredients and culture. They can be fashioned or designed to represent a theme or color. Many cultures, states, cities, restaurants, bars, etc. have Signature drinks that represent the customs and prides of the people who live in the area or near the establishments boasting the unique beverage.

== History ==
Signature drinks have a long and colorful history and were being invented well before the 21st century. Signature cocktails are most often designed after the spirit produced in the country where the drink is coming from. Stories exist for many alcoholic beverages including vodka, gin, tequila, bourbon, and liqueurs of all kinds.

An example of a Signature drink being concocted with a particular liquor is rum and the Mojito. Historians suggest that the Mojito came about when slaves working in the fields in the late 19th century invented it, using guarapo, rum, and lime juice. Although this story seems to be related to, or more likely, confused with the origin of the daiquiri, another popular Cuban drink. Another popular legend is that an English pirate, an associate of Sir Francis Drake, concocted a beverage similar to the Mojito whilst in Havana by mixing aguardiente, sugar, lime, and mint as a cure for the scurvy and dysentery plaguing the ship's crew. Shortly after, a cocktail known as “El Draque,” which was made with similar ingredients, became popular in Cuba.

An example of a Signature drink designed for an establishment is the Bellini. It was concocted by Giuseppe Cipriani, the bartender and owner of Harry's Bar in Venice, Italy. Italian white peaches were one of Cipriani's favorite fruits, but were only available from June to September. In a moment of inspiration, he created this refreshing summer beverage by combining the fresh white peaches with prosecco. He named his cocktail after Giovanni Bellini, a famous Italian painter from the late 15th century.

== Trends ==
Signature drinks have become popular as bartenders, bars, and restaurant strive to distinguish themselves from their competitors. Signature drinks enhance a patron's experience and create a draw for the special events industry, as it can be used to continue a key color or theme into the bar area. At wedding receptions and events, a signature drink in lieu of offering an entire bar, thus saving money. The drink reflects the wedding party's tastes. Wedding companies assist couples with the formulation of signature drinks.

Many liquor companies are coming out with all sorts of versions of flavored spirits. With signature drinks it is customary to infuse the liquor yourself, therefore creating a unique concoction. The use of fruit-infused liquors is gives creators a wide range of fruits to choose from. Also the vibrant colors of individual fruits add to the drink's personality.

The use of herbs to infuse spirits has created a different line of cocktails. These herb-infused drinks tend to be more savory than sweet and lend a different taste to the occasion. The use of Basil, Rosemary, Sage, Tarragon, Thyme and Mint are becoming common in the drink arena. Edible flowers, floral extracts, and floral-based spirits are occasionally incorporated. Edible flowers like Anise Hyssop, Carnation petals, Lavender, Rose petals and Violets will add complex floral or vegetative elements to mixed drinks. Syrups and extracts infused with petals and stems incorporate a more concentrated flavor of the blossoms to cocktails. Floral garnishes infuse the cocktail aroma with a stronger floral note and add beauty to the presentation.

== Competitions ==
The purpose of the United States Bartenders’ Guild (USBG) is to improve customer-bartender relations and increase the prestige and knowledge of practicing bartenders. They host an annual bartending competition where bartenders are given the task of creating unique drinks. USBG members also participate in many other events and competitions during the year.

The World Barista Championship is a premier competition that consists of the winners of the National Barista Championship. These contestants are challenged to make twelve coffee beverages, four of which are signature drinks.

Tales of the Cocktail is the largest festival of its kind and is dedicated to the advancement of the craft of the cocktail through education, networking, and promotion. The festival is held annually in New Orleans, LA. Bartender Dale DeGroff has served as a panelist at the event.
