= Paul Bassett =

Coffeehouse chain

- Paul Bassett in Jeju City, South Korea
- Founder: Paul Bassett
- Headquarters: Australia
- Products: tea and coffee

Paul Bassett is a brand name of coffeehouses that operates in Japan and South Korea, named after World Barista Championship winning Australian barista Paul Bassett. The businesses in both countries share the same logo.

== Operations ==
=== Japan ===
The Paul Bassett branded coffeehouses, operated by Y's Table, first opened in 2006. As of 2017, there are two stores in Japan: one in Shinjuku, and the other in Shibuya.

=== South Korea ===
The first Paul Bassett branded coffeehouse in South Korea opened in 2009. Initially operated by Maeil Dairies, the coffeehouse business was spun off into a new company, M's Seed (still a subsidiary of Maeil), in 2013.

As of 2017, the chain celebrated the opening of its 80th coffee franchise in South Korea with most stores located in the Seoul Capital Area.

== See also ==
- List of coffeehouse chains
