= Barista (film) =

- Directed by: Rock Baijnauth
- Cinematography: Robert Kraetsch; Roger Singh
- Edited by: Andrew Moniz
- Production company: Filmic Entertainment
- Distributed by: Samuel Goldwyn Films (US)
- Release date: November 6, 2015
- Running time: 103 minutes
- Country: United States
- Language: English

Barista is a 2015 American documentary film directed by Rock Baijnauth. The film follows five baristas, as they prepare for the 2013 United States Barista Championship. It is the first in a series. Viewers are introduced to the elevation of the everyday drink, into a craft culture not unlike that of beer and wine. The film was acquired for distribution by Samuel Goldwyn Films.

== Synopsis ==
The film follows four baristas preparing for the 2013 United States Barista Championship. Eden-Marie Abramowicz, Charlie Habegger, Truman Severson and Ryan Redden obsess over every detail when it comes to extracting the perfect cup of coffee. As the film progresses, the makers add a fifth personality, Los Angeles-based Charles Babinski, who decides to compete.

Babinski, who has endorsement deals with a major coffee brand, becomes the dominant personality. His cockiness provides a stark contrast to the humble obsessiveness of the other four personalities.

== Sequel ==
In 2019, the sequel to Barista, Baristas was released and was distributed by The Orchard.
