= Samuel Goldwyn Films =

American studio for art-house, independent and foreign films

Samuel Goldwyn Films, LLC
- Type: Private
- Industry: Motion pictures
- Predecessor: The Samuel Goldwyn Company
- Founded: April 6, 2000; 26 years ago
- Founder: Samuel Goldwyn Jr.
- Headquarters: Culver City, California, U.S.
- Key people: Peter Goldwyn (President)
- Website: samuelgoldwynfilms.com

Samuel Goldwyn Films, LLC is an American film company that licenses, releases and distributes art-house, independent and foreign films. It was founded by Samuel Goldwyn Jr., the son of the Hollywood business magnate/mogul, Samuel Goldwyn. The current incarnation is a successor to The Samuel Goldwyn Company.

== Background ==
After The Samuel Goldwyn Company was acquired by Orion Pictures Corporation in 1996 and by Metro-Goldwyn-Mayer in 1997, Samuel Goldwyn Jr. founded Samuel Goldwyn Films as an independent production/distribution studio. Until his death, Goldwyn owned sole rights to the use of the name and signature logo as part of the settlement of his 1999 lawsuit against Metro-Goldwyn-Mayer, which changed its Goldwyn subsidiary's name to G2 Films. Goldwyn previously operated IDP Distribution, which distributed films for Fireworks Films, Stratosphere Entertainment, and Roadside Attractions.

== Films ==
This is a list of films distributed and/or produced by Samuel Goldwyn Films.

=== 1990s ===
Release date	Title	Notes
1998	Lolita	co-production with Pathé
1998	The Red Dwarf	
1998	The Chambermaid on the Titanic	
1999	Tinseltown	
1999	Desert Blue	
1999	The King of Masks	
1999	Solas	co-production with Fireworks Pictures
1999	Splendor	co-production with Summit Entertainment and Newmarket Capital Group
1999	Shiri	co-distribution with Destination Films

=== 2000s ===
Release date	Title	Notes
2000	Faithless	co-production with AB Svensk Filmindustri and Fireworks Pictures
2000	The Big Blue	Director's Cut re-release produced by Gaumont
2000	Better Than Sex	co-production with Fireworks Pictures
2000	Greenfingers	co-production with Fireworks Pictures
2001	The Experiment	co-production with Fanes Film, Senator Film Produktion, Seven Pictures and Typhoon
2001	Me Without You	co-production with Capitol Films and Fireworks Pictures
2001	The Man from Elysian Fields	co-production with Fireworks Pictures, Gold Circle Films and Shoreline Entertainment
2001	Little Secrets	co-production with TriStar Pictures
2001	Tortilla Soup	co-production with Starz Encore Entertainment
2001	Cowboy Bebop: The Movie	co-distributed with Destination Films in the US; produced in Japan by Sunrise Animation and Bones
2002	Sonny	co-production with Gold Circle Films and Saturn Films
2002	He Loves Me... He Loves Me Not	co-production with UGC Fox Distribution and Union Générale Cinématographique
2002	Raising Victor Vargas	co-production with Fireworks Pictures
2002	Poolhall Junkies	co-production with Gold Circle Films
2002	Passionada	co-production with Fireworks Pictures
2002	The Crime of Father Amaro	co-production with Almeda Films, Blu Films and Wanda Films
2002	Returner	co-production with Robot Communications; co-distribution with Pony Canyon and Toho
2002	Anything but Love	
2003	I Capture the Castle	produced by BBC Films and Trademark Films
2003	All Your Difference	
2003	Nola	co-production with Fireworks Pictures
2003	Japanese Story	co-production with Fortissimo Films
2003	Rosenstrasse	co-production with Concorde Film
2003	Tokyo Godfathers	co-distribution with Destination Films; produced by Madhouse
2003	Kaena: The Prophecy	co-production with Destination Films, TVA and Xilam
2003	Mambo Italiano	co-production with Equinoxe Films and Cinémaginaire
2003	The Boys and Girl from County Clare	
2003	Master and Commander: The Far Side of the World	Nominated for the Academy Award for Best Picture; co-production with 20th Century Fox, Universal Pictures, and Miramax Films
2004	What the Bleep Do We Know!?	co-production with Roadside Attractions
2004	D.E.B.S.	co-production with Screen Gems, Destination Films and Anonymous Content
2004	Walk on Water	co-production with Roadside Attractions
2004	Tae Guk Gi: The Brotherhood of War	co-production with Destination Films
2004	Super Size Me	co-production with Roadside Attractions and The Con
2004	Ladies in Lavender	co-production with Roadside Attractions
2004	Saint Ralph	
2004	Lila Says	
2004	Stateside	co-production with Seven Hills Pictures
2004	The Code	co-distributed with TriStar Pictures and Columbia Pictures in the US; produced in France by Gaumont
2005	The Squid and the Whale	co-production with Destination Films and American Empirical Pictures
2005	Pretty Persuasion	co-production with Roadside Attractions, REN-Mar Studios and Prospect Pictures
2005	Infiltrating D.E.B.S.	
2005	Wah-Wah	co-production with Scion Films, IMG Productions, Lorna Nasha and Reeleyes Film
2005	London	co-distributed with Destination Films
2005	Lassie	co-production with Classic Media and Odyssey Entertainment; distributed by Roadside Attractions
2005	Revolver	co-production with Destination Films
2005	Marilyn Hotchkiss' Ballroom Dancing and Charm School	
2005	MirrorMask	co-production with Destination Films and The Jim Henson Company
2005	Blind Dating	
2005	Boynton Beach Club	co-production with Roadside Attractions
2006	Sleeping Dogs Lie	co-production with Roadside Attractions and HareBrained Films
2006	Facing the Giants	co-production with Destination Films, Sherwood Pictures, Provident Films, Caramel Entertainment and Kendrick Brothers Group
2006	Lonely Hearts	co-production with Roadside Attractions, Millennium Films, Emmett/Furla Films
2006	Conversations with God	
2006	Seraphim Falls	co-production with Destination Films and Icon Productions
2006	O Jerusalem	
2006	Goya's Ghosts	co-production with The Saul Zaentz Company, Kanzaman, Antena 3 Televisión and Xuxa Producciones
2006	Priceless	US distribution
2006	Amazing Grace	co-production with FourBoys Films, Bristol Bay Productions, Ingenious Film Partners and Roadside Attractions
2006	What the Bleep!?: Down the Rabbit Hole	co-production with Roadside Attractions
2007	2 Days in Paris	co-production with Polaris Film Production & Finance
2007	Southland Tales	co-distribution with Destination Films; co-production with Darko Entertainment, Persistent Entertainment and Cherry Road Films
2007	Rise: Blood Hunter	co-production with Ghost House Pictures, Destination Films and Mandate Pictures
2007	Roman de Gare	
2007	Fugitive Pieces	
2007	Trumbo	co-distribution with IDP Distribution and Red Envelope Entertainment; co-production with Filbert Steps Productions, Reno Productions and Safehouse Pictures
2007	This Is the Way the World Ends	
2008	Fireproof	co-production with Affirm Films, Provident Films, Caramel Entertainment and Sherwood Pictures
2008	The Merry Gentleman	
2008	The Yellow Handkerchief	
2008	Elegy	co-production with Lakeshore Entertainment
2008	Dark Streets	
2008	Free Style	co-production with Canal Street Films, Rigel Entertainment and Up North Entertainment
2009	Brothers at War	
2009	American Violet	co-distribution with Uncommon Productions; co-production with Cinema Management Group
2009	The Double Hour	
2009	To Save a Life	co-production with New Song Pictures, Outreach Films and Accelerated Entertainment
2009	Management	co-production with Echo Films, Image Entertainment, SKE and Temple Hill Entertainment
2009	Blood: The Last Vampire	co-production with Production I.G and Destination Films
2009	Cold Souls	
2009	(Untitled)	
2009	U.N. Me	co-production with Disruptive Pictures

=== 2010s ===
Release date	Title	Notes
2010	Mao's Last Dancer	co-production with Great Scott Productions Pty. Ltd.
2010	Harry Brown	US distribution; co-production with Marv Partners, UK Film Council, HanWay Films, Prescience and Framestore Features
2010	The Dead Sea	
2010	Legendary	co-production with WWE Studios
2010	Knucklehead	co-production with WWE Studios
2010	Welcome to the Rileys	co-production with Destination Films
2011	The Whistleblower	co-production with Voltage Pictures
2011	The Chaperone	co-production with WWE Studios
2011	That's What I Am	co-production with WWE Studios
2011	Elektra Luxx	co-production with Destination Films
2011	The Grace Card	co-production with Affirm Films, Provident Films and Graceworks Pictures
2011	Bloodworth	
2011	There Be Dragons	
2011	The Reunion	co-production with WWE Studios
2011	The Island President	co-production with Actual Films
2011	Assassination Games	co-production with MediaPro Studios and Rodin Entertainment
2011	Inside Out	co-production with WWE Studios
2011	Mardi Gras: Spring Break	co-production with Screen Gems and Beacon Pictures
2011	A Good Old Fashioned Orgy	co-production with Endgame Entertainment and Stage 6 Films
2012	Detention	US theatrical only; co-production with Detention Films and Sony Pictures Worldwide Acquisitions
2012	October Baby	co-production with American Family Studios, Provident Films and Gravitas Ventures
2012	Cowgirls 'n Angels	co-production with Sense and Sensibility Ventures and Silver Nitrate
2012	The First Time	co-production with Destination Films and Jerimaca Films
2012	Robot & Frank	co-production with Stage 6 Films, Park Pictures, White Hat Entertainment and Dog Run Pictures
2013	Home Run	co-production with Provident Films
2013	Goodbye World	co-production with Stage 6 Films, Gather Films and Picturesque Films
2013	The Secret Life of Walter Mitty	co-production with 20th Century Fox, New Line Cinema and Red Hour Productions
2013	SOMM	
2014	The Last of Robin Hood	co-production with Big Indie Pictures and Killer Films
2014	Better Living Through Chemistry	co-production with Occupant Entertainment
2014	Ivory Tower	co-production with Paramount Pictures, Participant Media and CNN Films
2014	That Sugar Film	produced by Madman Entertainment
2014	Saving Christmas	co-production with Camfam Studios, Liberty University, Provident Films and XDX2
2015	Faith of Our Fathers	co-production with Pure Flix Entertainment
2015	X+Y	co-production with Koch Media, Origin Pictures and Minnow Films
2015	Yakuza Apocalypse	co-production with Django Film, Gambit, Happinet and OLM, Inc.
2015	Franny	co -production with Audax Films, Big Shoes Media, Magnolia Entertainment, Soaring Flight Productions, TideRock Media and Treehouse Pictures
2015	Lila & Eve	co-production with A+E Studios, ChickFlick Productions, JuVee Productions and Lifetime Films
2015	East Side Sushi	
2015	90 Minutes in Heaven	co-production with Emmett/Furla Films, Family Christian Entertainment and Giving Films
2015	No Men Beyond This Point	
2015	Barista	Produced by Filmic Entertainment
2015	SOMM: Into the Bottle	
2015	Coming Through the Rye	co-production with Eammon Films, Red Hat Films and River Bend Pictures
2016	Hyena Road	U.S. distribution; produced by Thump Entertainment, Skybound Entertainment and Digger Productions
2016	The Benefactor	co-production with Audax Films, Big Shoes Media, Magnolia Entertainment, Soaring Flight Productions, TideRock Media and Treehouse Pictures
2016	Brother Nature	produced by Broadway Video and Insurge Pictures
2016	Altamira	co-distribution with 20th Century Fox and Eagle Films
2016	Pet	co-distribution with Orion Pictures; co-production with Magic Lantern and Revolver Picture Company
2016	Transpecos	co-production with 8750 Films and Marfa Peach Company
2016	Who Gets the Dog?	co-production with 2DS Productions and Epic Pictures Group
2016	Nerdland	produced by AKW Worldwide, Pariah and Titmouse, Inc.
2016	The King's Choice	
2017	Youth in Oregon	co-distribution with Orion Pictures; co-production with Sundial Pictures and Campfire
2017	100 Streets	co-production with CrossDay Productions Ltd., Green Door Pictures, Kreo Films FZ, West Fiction Films and What's the Story
2017	Lavender	co-production with South Creek Pictures and 3 Legged Dog Films
2017	Maya Dardel	co-production with The Winter Film Company, Greyshack Films and Message Film; co-distribution with Samuel Goldwyn Films
2017	Past Life	co-production with Orion Pictures
2017	The Price	co-distribution with Orion Pictures
2017	Sweet Country	
2017	Blame	
2018	Saturday Church	
2018	Love, Kennedy	
2018	Submergence	
2018	Little Pink House	
2018	Wait for Your Laugh	
2018	Zoo	
2018	Nancy	
2018	Night Comes On	co-production with Superlative Films
2018	Hope Springs Eternal	
2018	Cold Skin	
2018	Becoming Jiff	
2018	Somm	
2018	Queen of Spades	
2018	A Boy. A Girl. A Dream.	
2018	Back Roads	
2018	Buffalo Boys	
2018	Mapplethorpe	
2018	Jane and Emma	
2019	Sobibor	
2019	Avengement	
2019	Come as You Are	
2019	Daniel Isn't Real	co-production with Shudder
2019	Dilili in Paris	
2019	Judy and Punch	produced by Vice Studios
2019	Obsession	
2019	Paradise Hills	co-production with Nostromo Pictures
2019	Summer Night	
2019	Super Size Me 2: Holy Chicken!	

=== 2020s ===
Release date	Title	Notes
2020	Debt Collectors	
2020	City of Joel	co-production with Visit Films
2020	To the Stars	co-production with Northern Light Films, Foton Pictures and Rockhill Media
2020	The Flood	co-production with Myriad Pictures and Megatopia Films
2020	Endings, Beginnings	co-production with CJ Entertainment
2020	Bull	co-distribution with Sony Pictures Worldwide; co-production with Bert Marcus Film and Invisible Pictures
2020	Henri Dauman: Looking Up	
2020	Mr Jones	co-production with Boy Jones Films, Film Produkcja and Kinorob
2020	Extracurricular	
2020	Triggered	
2020	The Good Traitor	
2021	Lazarus	
2021	Edge of the World	
2021	Dreamcatcher	
2021	Let Us In	
2021	Minamata	
2022	Lunana: A Yak in the Classroom	U.S. distribution
2022	Big Gold Brick	U.S. distribution
2022	Art of Love	U.S. distribution
2022	Accident Man: Hitman's Holiday	co-production with Destination Films
2022	The Devil Conspiracy	
2022	Manifest West	
2023	The Three Musketeers: D'Artagnan	
2023	The Three Musketeers: Milady	
2023	Bank of Dave	
2023	Outlaw Johnny Black	
2023	Stars Fell Again	
2023	Glisten and the Merry Mission	co-production with Build-A-Bear Entertainment and Foundation Media Partners
2024	The Thicket	co-production with Tubi Films, Estuary Films and Orogen Entertainment
2024	The Count of Monte Cristo	
2024	The Last Rifleman	
2024	Cobweb	
2024	Absolution	
2025	Killing Mary Sue	
2025	The Moogai	
2025	William Tell	
2025	Red Sonja	
2025	Tin Soldier	
2025	Gladiator Underground	
2025	Finally Dawn	
2026	Cold Storage	
2026	Heads or Tails?	
2026	The Last Viking	
2026	13 Days, 13 Nights	
2026	The Girl in the River	
2026	The Mongoose	
2026	De Gaulle	
2027	Kill Me	

== See also ==
- The Samuel Goldwyn Company, predecessor to Samuel Goldwyn Films
- Samuel Goldwyn Studio
- Metro-Goldwyn-Mayer
- Samuel Goldwyn Television
- Samuel Goldwyn Productions

== Notes ==
1. Warner Bros. through New Line Cinema is handling the production for The Secret Life of Walter Mitty with Samuel Goldwyn Films and Red Hour Films, while 20th Century Fox will release the film.
2. Samuel Goldwyn Films handled the US theatrical release of Detention, while Sony Pictures Worldwide Acquisitions handled the worldwide release and the US DVD and Blu-ray release.
