= Bahrisons Booksellers =

Bookstore in Delhi, India

Bahrisons Bookstore is a bookstore in Khan Market, New Delhi, India, established in 1953 by Balraj Bahri Malhotra.

== History ==
During the Partition of India in 1947. Balraj Bahri Malhotra, a 19-year-old refugee from Malakwal (now in Pakistan), along with his family, fled to Delhi. The family settled in the Kingsway Camp refugee area.

In Delhi, Balraj Bahri met his future wife, Bhag, who also came from a refugee background, having migrated from Dera Ismail Khan in the North-West Frontier Province. Life as a refugee was challenging, and in the early years, Balraj and his brother took on various jobs to support their family. They worked on trains, sold pens, and engaged in the printing and distribution of government publications Initially working at a store in Chandni Chowk selling fountain pens, Bahri decided to open a bookstore. In 1953, with the help of Prem Sagar, owner of Lakshmi Bookstore in Janpath, with limited resources and by selling one of his mother's gold bangles for initial capital, Bahri opened Bahrisons Bookstore in Khan Market.

Balraj Bahri's wife, Bhag, played a significant role in the bookstore's operations, managing the cash counter and later taking early retirement from her government job to support the family business full-time. In 1978, their son, Anuj, joined the business, and Bahrisons Bookshop is currently run by him and his wife Rajni.

In 2002, Bahri expanded the operations to include a publishing house, Tara-India Research Press, and in 2008, added a literary agency called Red Ink Literary and Film Agency.

At its 50th anniversary in 2003, a history of Bahrisons, titled Chronicle of a Bookshop, was published by Anuj Bahri. An updated and revised edition, written by Bahri in collaboration with his daughter, the oral historian Aanchal Malhotra, was published to commemorate the 70th anniversary of the bookshop in 2023.
