= Sprudge =

American coffee blog

- Website type: Blog
- Owner: Dolcepump LLC
- Website: sprudge.com
- Commercial: Yes
- Launched: September 2009
- Current status: Active

Sprudge is an American blog founded by Zachary Carlsen and Jordan Michelman and based in Portland, Oregon, focusing on "coffee news and gossip".

== History ==
Founded in 2009, Sprudge is a coffee news and lifestyle website. It is the flagship blog of the Sprudge Media Network, which manages sister sites Sprudge Maps, Sprudge Live, and Sprudge Wire. In its first three months of existence, the website was called "The Sprudge Report" and was a direct visual parody of the Drudge Report.

Today, the site focuses primarily on coverage of the modern specialty coffee industry, coffee history, and coffee within cultural and sociopolitical contexts. It publishes a breadth of City Guides, as well as includes a job board for those seeking careers in the industry.

Sprudge came under scrutiny after publishing the name of an anonymous author of a blog titled "The Bitter Barista", resulting in the termination of the author's job.

In 2013, Jordan Michelman and Zachary Carlsen received the Distinguished Author Award from the Specialty Coffee Association of America. The Sprudge Media Network was recognized as a 2017 Webby Award Honoree in the Cultural Blog/Website category.

In 2016 the Coffee Sprudgecast was launched, a podcast featuring interviews with business owners, baristas, and other members of the world coffee community. The Coffee Buildcast, a subset of the Coffee Sprudgecast, focuses on new coffee shops under construction.

In 2018, Michelman and Carlsen co-wrote The New Rules of Coffee: A Modern Guide For Everyone, an illustrated guide to coffee published by Ten Speed Press, a division of Penguin Random House. Their second book, But First, Coffee was published in 2023 by Union Square & Co. focusing on brew methods and diverse coffee recipes.

Sprudge teamed up with South by Southwest to curate the Roasters Village, an extension of the 2018 SouthBites Trailer Park food program at the festival. Today the concept of Roasters Village lives on within the Sprudge site as spotlighted links to current interesting coffees available for purchase online.
