= Single-origin coffee =

Coffee grown within a single geographic origin

Single-origin coffee is coffee grown within a single known geographic origin.

Single-origins can offer unique characteristics and specific tastes compared to blended coffees from multiple origins. Coffee shops can market single-origin coffees specifically to add symbolic value to the coffee by highlighting the producer or the coffee's unique origin. Consumers of specialty coffee are often attracted to single-origin coffee for the transparency it often attempts to convey.

There are no universal rules, or governing bodies enforcing the labeling of coffee. However, there are governmental bodies in some countries that regulate the coffee market, for example in Brazil.

While it is still difficult to accurately authenticate a coffee's origin, recent genomic research indicates that it is possible to identify a DNA fingerprint of coffee trees. This technique may eventually allow buyers of un-roasted, green coffee, to authenticate a single-origin coffee. This would improve the transparency and traceability of coffee.

== Terminology ==
Single-origin coffees may come from a single farm, multiple farms from the same country, or just a blend of the coffees grown from that country. It could also mean an entire country which produces a comprehensive variety of beans, such as Brazil, Colombia, and Vietnam.

Estate coffees are a specific type of single-origin coffee. They are generally grown on one massive farm, ranging in size from a few acres to large plantations occupying many square miles or a collection of farms that all process their coffee at the same mill. Many countries in South and Central America have estate coffee farms, countries such as Colombia, Brazil, Costa Rica, and Mexico, have many estate farms. Starbucks owns a large majority of coffee farms in the Philippines, combining many small farms to form one giant cooperative farm.

Micro-lot or small-lot coffees are another type of specific single-origin coffee from a single field on a farm, a small range of altitude, and a particular day of harvest. Many micro-lots are used for growing specialty coffee, which is some of the highest quality coffee offered on the market, which can range in prices.

== See also ==
- Specialty coffee
- Third wave of coffee
- Terroir
