= World Barista Championship =

Annual coffee competition

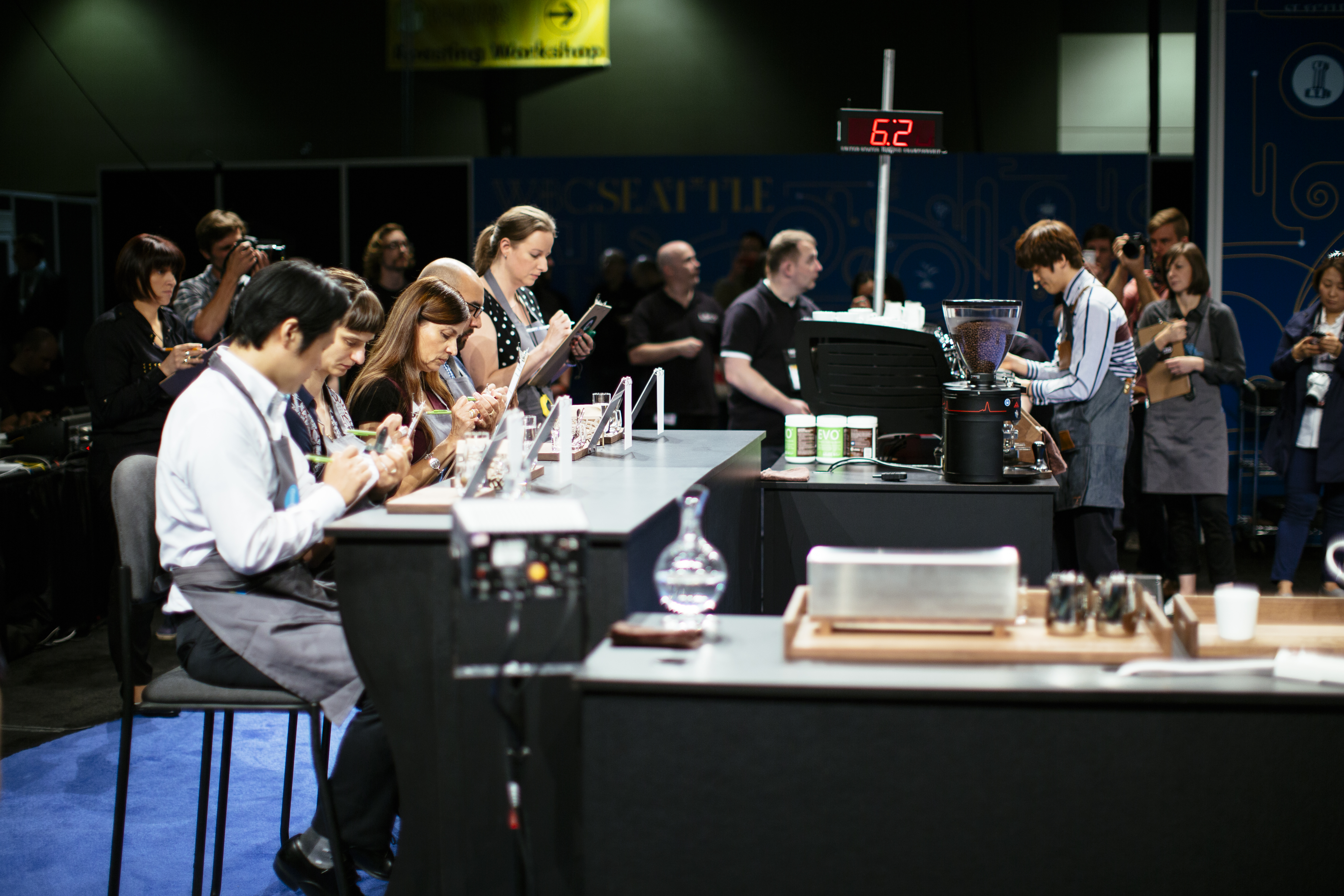
Barista Jong Hoon Lee preparing coffee at the 2015 World Barista Championships while several judges take notes

The World Barista Championship (WBC) is an annual barista competition for the title of World Barista Champion. It is one of seven World Coffee Championships produced by the Specialty Coffee Association (SCA) through a wholly owned subsidiary. The competition is composed of the winners of the national barista championships, which are operated by the SCA chapters, or an approved, independent, non-profit national body. First held in 2000, the event is hosted in a different city every year. The 2025 edition, held in Milan, Italy, in October 2025, was won by Jack Simpson of Australia. The 2026 championship is scheduled for 22–25 October 2026 in Panama City and will be the first held in Central America.

== History ==
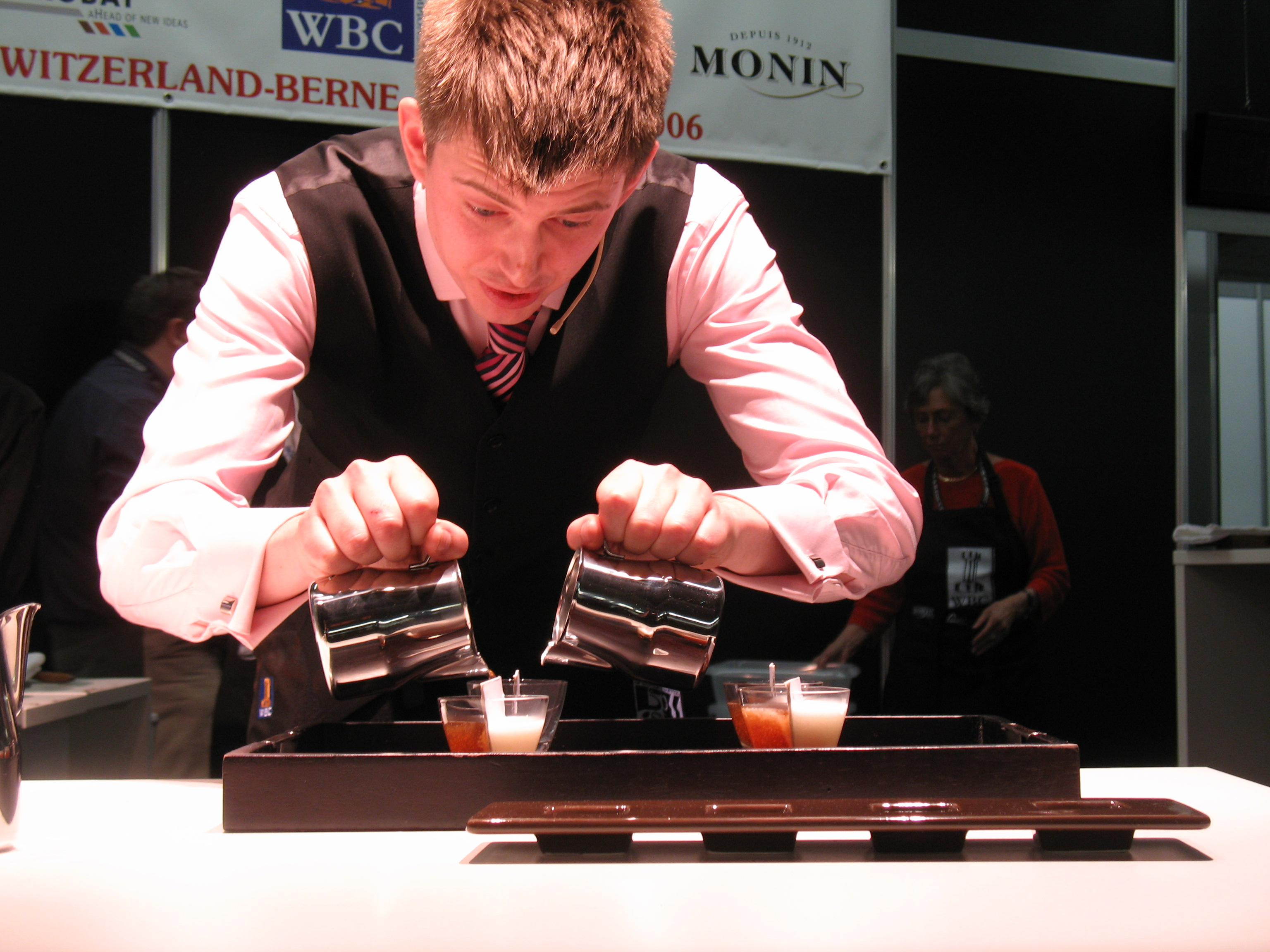
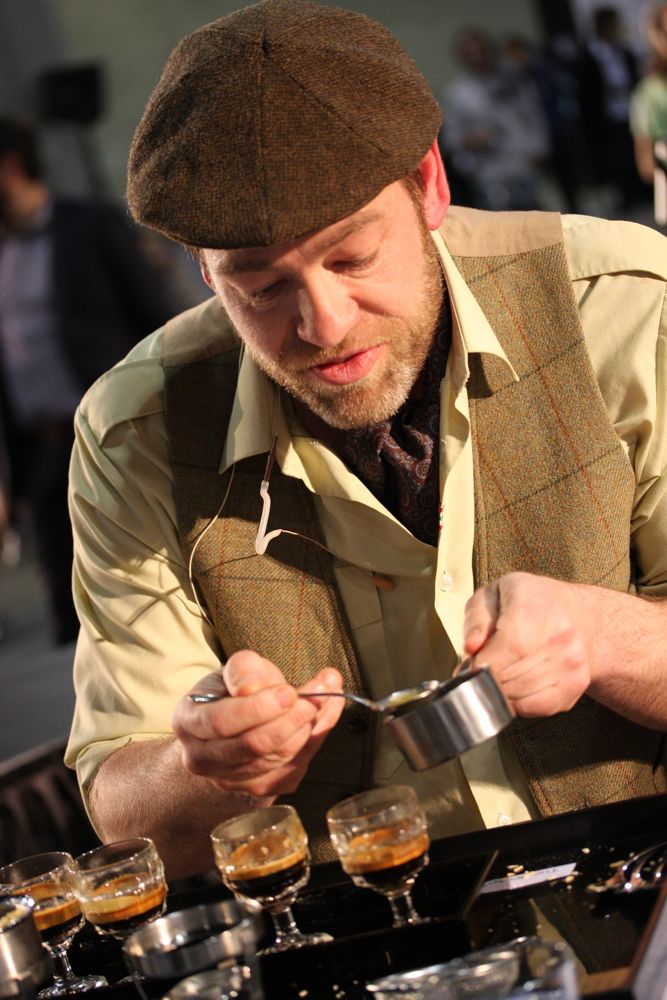
James Hoffmann (left) and Gwilym Davies (right) preparing drinks at the World Barista Championships in 2006 and 2009 respectively.

The first competition was in Monte Carlo in 2000. The WBC was dominated in its early years by Scandinavian baristas and was held in Europe or the United States from its inception until 2007, when it moved to Tokyo, Japan. The Tokyo championship was also the first to be broadcast live online.

The 2003 championship in Boston introduced the format of twelve drinks served to four sensory judges, and held the first calibration session for judges. The 2011 and 2012 titles went to baristas from major coffee-producing countries, Alejandro Méndez of El Salvador and Raúl Rodas of Guatemala.

Writing in Gastronomica in 2020, Sabine Parrish argued that barista competitions exist to legitimize the barista as a skilled worker, but that they rest on gendered ideas of skill, professionalism and performance in which the ideal barista is assumed to be male. Her study drew on data from more than 400 female baristas in the United States. William M. Cotter, writing in Signs and Society in 2021, attributed the rise of baristas to professional status partly to the growth of barista competitions, and described how competitors draw on the authority of coffee farmers and roasters in their routines to support their own professional image.

In 2016, significant changes were made to the competition format: competitors could no longer bring their own grinders, which were instead provided by the competition's partner (Mahlkönig); a new espresso machine model, the Victoria Arduino Black Eagle, was introduced; and the cappuccino was replaced by a broader "milk drink" component.

In 2018, Agnieszka Rojewska became the first woman to win the World Barista Championship.

The 2020 championship was due to take place in Melbourne but was cancelled because of the COVID-19 pandemic.

The championship resumed in 2021 in Milan, where it was held alongside the HostMilano trade fair, and Diego Campos became the first Colombian to win the title. Anthony Douglas of Australia won the 2022 edition at the Melbourne International Coffee Expo. Boram Um won in Athens in 2023, the first Brazilian to do so, and in 2024 Mikael Jasin, the first Indonesian champion, won at the inaugural World of Coffee Asia trade show in Busan.

The 2025 championship returned to Milan, where it was held at the HostMilano trade fair; Jack Simpson, the runner-up in 2024, became the fourth Australian to win the title. The 2026 championship in Panama City will be the first held in Central America, and the 2027 championship is scheduled for Tokyo.

== Competition format ==
There are three rounds of judging: the first round, the semi-finals and the final. The first round included 56 national barista champions in 2018 and 53 in 2024. The top 15 competitors advance to the semi-finals, plus a wildcard: the highest-scoring competitor not already through from the team with the best average first-round ranking. Competitors are placed in teams, and each must work a shift on the Team Bar, serving coffee to the public, to be eligible for the wildcard. The final round comprises the six highest-scoring baristas from the semi-finals and takes place on the last day of the competition, which ran over four days in 2017 and 2024. In each round competitors present a 15-minute routine in which they must prepare and serve a total of 12 drinks: one espresso, one milk beverage and one "signature beverage" (a non-alcoholic espresso-based cocktail) to each of four sensory judges. Competitors who advance usually perform their routine again in the next round, although the rules allow them to change the layout of their station between rounds.

The four sensory judges award points on a variety of factors including the taste of the barista's beverages, creativity and presentation. In the first round a technical judge also evaluates the competitor's workflow, use of tools and equipment, and the cleanliness of the station; the semi-finals and final are judged by the four sensory judges and a head judge. The judges' points are totalled to produce a final score for each barista in each round. The baristas with the highest scores advance from the first and second rounds, and the barista with the greatest score in the final round wins the title.

In late 2023, the SCA updated the rules for the 2024 championship to allow the use of infused and co-fermented coffees in baristas' routines, provided that no additives are introduced after the coffee reaches the green-coffee stage.

== Organization ==
The WBC was operated by World Coffee Events (WCE), an events company jointly owned by the Specialty Coffee Association of America (SCAA) and the Speciality Coffee Association of Europe (SCAE) that administered an annual portfolio of international coffee competitions and exhibitions, with the aim of making competition and judging consistent worldwide. In January 2017 the SCAA and SCAE unified as the Specialty Coffee Association (SCA). The WBC is one of seven World Coffee Championships produced by the SCA, through a wholly owned subsidiary.

The national barista competitions are each organized by their respective national coffee organizations, which the championships refer to as Competition Bodies; baristas from more than 50 of them compete at the WBC.

In April 2026 the World Coffee Championships began designating Taiwanese competitors as representing the "Competition Body of Chinese Taipei", saying the change aligned with the naming used by the International Olympic Committee and FIFA. The new name also appeared on previously published rankings. The Taiwan Coffee Association said it had not initiated the change and described using "Chinese Taipei" as an unavoidable condition for taking part; the 2016 champion Berg Wu questioned the change, and a Taiwanese legislator, Lin Chu-yin, criticized it.

== Past winners ==
Year	Location	Winner and nationality		Ref(s)
2000	Monte Carlo, Monaco	Robert Thoresen	Norway	
2001	Miami, United States	Martin Hildebrandt	Denmark	
2002	Oslo, Norway	Fritz Storm	Denmark	
2003	Boston, United States	Paul Bassett	Australia	
2004	Trieste, Italy	Tim Wendelboe	Norway	
2005	Seattle, United States	Troels Overdal Poulsen	Denmark	
2006	Bern, Switzerland	Klaus Thomsen	Denmark	
2007	Tokyo, Japan	James Hoffmann	United Kingdom	
2008	Copenhagen, Denmark	Stephen Morrissey	Ireland	
2009	Atlanta, United States	Gwilym Davies	United Kingdom	
2010	London, United Kingdom	Michael Phillips	United States	
2011	Bogotá, Colombia	Alejandro Méndez	El Salvador	
2012	Vienna, Austria	Raúl Rodas	Guatemala	
2013	Melbourne, Australia	Pete Licata	United States	
2014	Rimini, Italy	Hidenori Izaki	Japan	
2015	Seattle, United States	Sasa Sestic	Australia	
2016	Dublin, Ireland	Berg Wu	Taiwan	
2017	Seoul, South Korea	Dale Harris	United Kingdom	
2018	Amsterdam, Netherlands	Agnieszka Rojewska	Poland	
2019	Boston, United States	Jooyeon Jeon	South Korea	
2020	Melbourne, Australia	Cancelled because of the COVID-19 pandemic		
2021	Milan, Italy	Diego Campos	Colombia	
2022	Melbourne, Australia	Anthony Douglas	Australia	
2023	Athens, Greece	Boram Julio Um	Brazil	
2024	Busan, South Korea	Mikael Jasin	Indonesia	
2025	Milan, Italy	Jack Simpson	Australia	
2026	Panama City, Panama	Pan Wei	China	
2027	Tokyo, Japan	Scheduled for 28 April – 1 May 2027		

== See also ==
- World Brewers Cup
- Latte art
- Third-wave coffee
- Speciality coffee
- Barista
