= Specialty Coffee Association of America =

International trade organization

The Specialty Coffee Association (SCA) (previously known as SCAA Specialty Coffee Association of America, pre-2017, founded in 1982) is a non-profit trade association for the specialty coffee industry. With members located in more than 40 countries, SCA represents different segments of the specialty coffee industry, including producers, roasters, importers/exporters and retailers.

In January 2017, the Specialty Coffee Association of America and the Specialty Coffee Association of Europe merged into one Specialty Coffee Association or simply SCA. The SCA has more than 10,000 active members. The stated purpose of the SCA is to foster a global coffee community and support the specialty coffee industry through research, standards, education, and events to create a sector that is thriving, equitable, and sustainable.

== International Focus ==
The SCA operates internationally, serving coffee professional across producing and consuming countries. Regional bodies, such as the National Coffee Association of America, create more geographically focused resources and materials.

== Research and Standards ==
The SCA develops technical standards, research initiatives, and best practices relating to coffee quality, sustainability, brewing, roasting, sensory evaluation, and professional education. The recently released Equitable Value Distribution Report and accompanying How-To-Guide, provides research into access to equity across the coffee value chain. The research provides honest insights into where the industry stands, particularly in terms of inequitable distribution of resources to producing countries. Additionally, the SCA publishes a bi-annual research publication, 25.

== Organizational Challenges ==
In 2005, management at the Specialty Coffee Association of America, an organization existing before the merger, discovered that former Chief Operating Officer Scott Welker had embezzled more than $465,000. Following the discovery, the organization undertook financial recovery efforts, and in 2009, Welker was sentenced to 33 months in federal prison by the U.S. Federal Court in Santa Ana, California.

In 2026, World Coffee Championships changed the nationality designation of Taiwanese competitor Bala, winner of the 2026 World Latte Art Championship, from "Taiwan" to "Taiwan Region" in its official records. Since May 2026, for international competition purposes, competitors now compete under the Competition Body of Chinese Taipei. The change drew criticism from some members of the coffee community and media outlets. The SCA stated that the revision was an administrative decision and cited naming practices used by organizations such as the International Olympic Committee and FIFA.

== See also ==
- National Coffee Association
