= Specialty coffee =

Term for highest-grade coffee

Specialty coffee is a term for the highest grade of coffee available, typically relating to the entire supply chain, using single-origin or single-estate coffee. The term was first used in 1974 by Erna Knutsen in an issue of Tea & Coffee Trade Journal. Knutsen used specialty coffee to describe beans of the best flavor which are produced in special micro-climates.

Specialty coffee is related to the farmers and the brewer what is known as the third wave of coffee, especially throughout North America. This refers to a modern demand for exceptional quality coffee, both farmed and brewed to a significantly higher than average standard.

== Definition ==
The widely accepted definition of specialty coffee is coffee scoring 80 points or above on the 100-point scale used on the Specialty Coffee Association Cupping form. Coffee scoring from 90 to 100 is graded Outstanding, coffee that scores 85–89.99 is graded Excellent, while coffee scoring 80–84.99 is graded Very Good.

The Specialty Coffee Association has a series of more detailed specifications (SCA is the union of the Specialty Coffee Association of America (SCAA) and Europe (SCAE)). The SCA sets standards for specialty coffee at every stage of the coffee production, including allowable defects in green beans, water standards, and brew strength. The SCA also sets clear standards on the coffee grading process. A minimum requirement for a specialty coffee is the number of defects: to be considered specialty a coffee must have 0 to 5 defects every 350 g (12 ounces) of milled beans.

Although there are different definitions of specialty coffee according to different international organisations, there is a general acceptance of a set of three minimum requirements: coffee should have been hand-picked by selective picking of mature beans, scoring 80 or above, maximum 5 defects per 350 g (12 ounces).

Many organisations and activists are working to include strict environmental and social indicators in the definition and grading of specialty coffee. For example, biologist Giorgio Piracci, president of the Peruvian NGO 7Elements Peru and producer of the first specialty coffee produced applying permaculture ethics and principles, argues that "there's a urgent need to redefine the concept of quality and to embed into it the environmental and socio-economic quality component both at production and distribution level"; according to his vision, "it makes no sense to talk about an 'excellent' coffee if this is produced using harmful pesticides, fertilisers or environmentally impacting farming techniques; in the same way, how can we talk about excellence if a cup of coffee is produced thanks to modern forms of slavery and human exploitation?"

== Growing locations ==
In general, coffee is grown in the "Bean Belt", between the Tropics of Cancer and Capricorn, which produce the tropical climate required for trees to thrive. Specialty coffee is typically grown in three continents: South and Central Americas, Asia, and Africa.

Panama, in particular, has been known to produce some of the most expensive specialty coffees. As of August 2025, the most expensive specialty coffee bean lot ever sold was a Panama Geisha for over US$13,700/lb (US$30,204 per kilogram).

Another key difference between specialty coffee and commercial coffee is how much the final flavor is influenced by climate, altitude, rainfall, and the skills of the coffee grower. Unlike commercial blends, which seek consistency, specialty coffee can vary noticeably from harvest to harvest, reflecting the environmental conditions of each year.

== Specialty coffee consumption ==
In Australia and New Zealand, specialty coffee is considered mainstream. This is perhaps partly due to a long history of espresso consumption, fuelled by large Italian and Greek migrations in the mid-twentieth century.

While specialty coffee in North America is rarely offered in major coffee chains, the Third Wave of Coffee has resulted in a significant increase in specialty coffee consumption. Independent, "Australian-style", or artisan cafes have opened in multiple cities. An SCAA report estimated the US had 29,300 specialty coffee shops in 2013, up from 2,850 in 1993.

Europe is already a major coffee market accounting for 30% of global consumption, but is seeing a growth in demand for specialty coffee while overall demand remains stable. In 2016, specialty coffee was Europe's fastest growing major restaurant category, with an increase of 9.1% from 2014 to 2015. Western Europe saw a particularly large growth of 10.5% in the specialty cafe market, while the overall coffee industry reduced by 1.5%, perhaps due to a longer history of coffee consumption.In 2021, Europe region emerged as the largest market for the global specialty coffee market with a 46.21% share of the market revenue.

Asia is projected to soon represent the world's largest consumer of specialty coffee, with over US$3.7 billion in new value growth projected from 2016 to 2020. Despite Asia being traditionally dominated by tea consumption, it is now easy to find specialty coffee shops across many Korean, Chinese and Japanese cities. The growing trend of coffee consumption in Asia, particularly in China, is driven by the perception of coffee as an experience rather than just a beverage. While the taste of coffee remains central, social media has shifted consumers' focus towards the symbolic meaning of drinking coffee as a representation of lifestyle.

There have also been increases in the consumption of coffee from countries traditionally responsible for growing coffee. Brazil's overall coffee consumption in 2014 was 21 million bags, close to that of the US at 23.4 million bags. Guatemala is also experiencing a surge in popularity of specialty coffee.

In Qatar and the rest of the Gulf region, the consumption of Specialty Coffee has increased progressively into a flourishing industry since mid-2010's. Noting Specialty Coffee is very distinct to the traditional Kahwah Al Arabiya which already had a considerable presence in the Gulf market.

The specialty coffee segment is on an upward trajectory, and its market value is expected to reach $152.69 billion by 2030. This is influenced by such factors as growing preferences towards high-quality coffee and increasing emphasis on sustainability.

== Associations in consuming countries ==
- Specialty Coffee Association of America
- Speciality Coffee Association of Europe
- Specialty Coffee Association of Japan
- New Zealand Specialty Coffee Association
- Singapore Coffee Association
- AustralAsian Specialty Coffee Association
- Specialty Coffee Association of Korea
- Specialty Coffee Association of Southern Africa
- SCA Italy
- SCA Nederland

== Associations in producing and consuming countries ==
- ANACAFE's Guatemalan Cup of Excellence
- Specialty Coffee Association of Bolivia
- Brazil Specialty Coffee Association
- Colombian Coffee Federation
- Specialty Coffee Association of Costa Rica
- African Fine Coffees Association
- Itzalco Fine Coffee Association of El Salvador
- Specialty Coffee Association of India
- Specialty Coffee Association of Indonesia
- Asociación de Cafés Especiales de Nicaragua
- Association of Special Coffees of Panama
- Specialty Coffee Association of Southern Africa
- Asociación Mexicana de Cafés y Cafeterías de Especialidad A.C.

== See also ==
- List of coffee beverages
- Specialty foods
