= Barista =

Person who prepares and serves coffee drinks

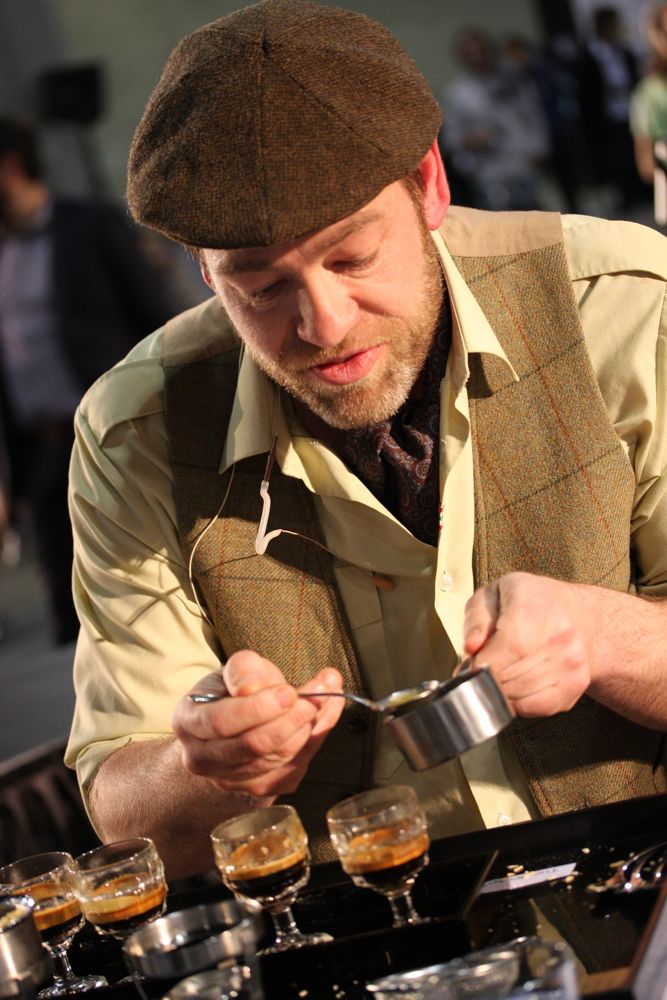
Gwilym Davies, World Barista Championship winner 2009

A barista (/bəˈriːstə, -ˈrɪs-/ bə-REE-stə, bə-RIST-ə, Italian: [baˈrista]; lit. 'bartender') is a person, usually a coffeehouse employee, who prepares and serves espresso-based coffee drinks and other beverages.

== Etymology and inflection ==
The word barista comes from Italian, where it means "bartender" who typically works behind a counter, serving hot drinks (such as espresso), cold alcoholic and non-alcoholic beverages, and snacks. The Italian plural is baristi for masculine (lit. 'barmen' or 'bartenders') or bariste for feminine (lit. 'barmaids'), while English and Spanish use "baristas".

== Application of the title ==
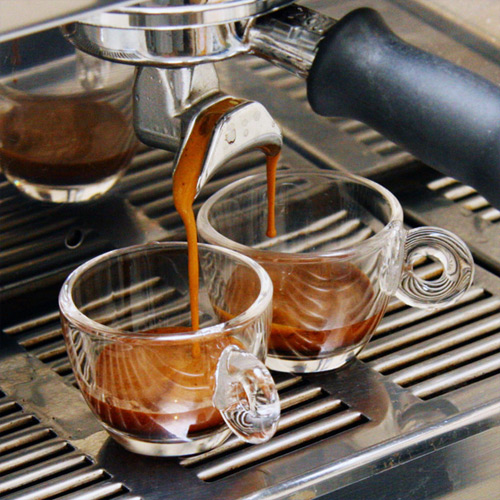
Exemplary espresso-making is essential to a barista's role. The term espresso comes from the Italian esprimere, which means 'to express', and refers to the process by which hot water is forced under pressure through ground coffee.

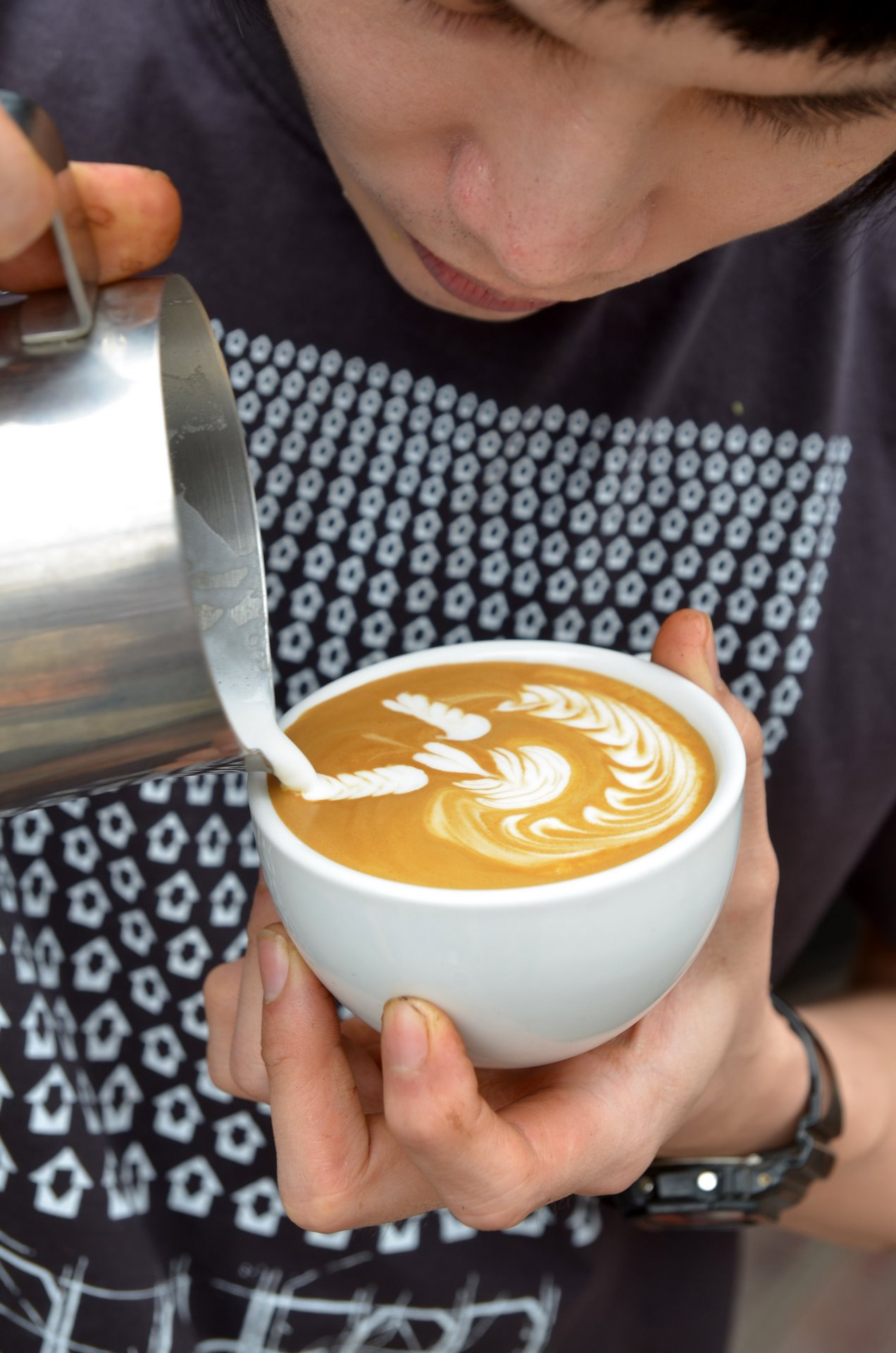
Latte art is a visible sign of a trained barista and well-frothed milk.

Baristas generally operate a commercial espresso machine, and their role is preparing and pulling the shot; the degree to which this is automated or done manually varies significantly, ranging from push-button operation to an involved manual process. Good manual espresso-making is considered a skilled task. The preparation of other beverages, particularly milk-based drinks such as cappuccinos and caffè lattes, but also non-espresso coffee such as drip or press pot, requires additional work and skill for effective frothing, pouring, and latte art.

The barista is usually trained to prepare coffee by the roaster or shop owner. Experienced baristas may have the discretion to vary the preparation or experiment.

Beyond the preparation of espresso and other beverages and general customer service, skilled baristas acquire knowledge of the entire process of coffee to effectively prepare a desired cup of coffee, including maintenance and programming of the machine, grinding methods, roasting, and coffee plant cultivation, similar to how a sommelier is familiar with the entire process of winemaking and consumption. A barista can acquire these skills by attending training classes, but they are more commonly learned on the job.

== Competition ==
Formal barista competitions originated in Norway, and one such is the World Barista Championships, held annually at varied international locations. The knowledge sharing at WBC is credited with spreading the beverage espresso and tonic to North America.

== See also ==
Media related to Baristas at Wikimedia Commons
