= Dan David (money manager) =

American investor

- Born: Flint, Michigan
- Education: Northern Michigan University
- Occupations: Investor, activist, short-seller, podcast host
- Known for: Whistle-blower, China expert, short seller
- Title: Founder of Wolfpack Research
- Website: https://www.wolfpackresearch.com/

Dan David is an American investor, activist short-seller and whistle-blower. He is the founder of New York-based Wolfpack Research, a financial research and due diligence investigation firm that was started in 2019 with support from short-seller Muddy Waters Research. In the fall of 2017, David and his work as a whistle-blower and China expert were the focus of the documentary film The China Hustle, which depicts how fraudulent Chinese companies stole billions of dollars from U.S. investors and retirees. In 2018, David was the Republican candidate for congress in Pennsylvania's 4th Congressional District, which includes Montgomery and Berks counties. He hosts of the "I Hung Up On Warren Buffett" podcast.

In Feb. 2023, Wolfpack published a research report that was critical of the investment banking firm, B. Riley Financial. Wolfpack wrote in the report that B. Riley's "biggest risk is that much of its loan book appears headed for bankruptcy." In Aug. 2024, B. Riley suspended its dividend, warned of losses and said it had received subpoenas from the Securities and Exchange Commission. The news sent the company's stock price down 50 percent in one day. In November 2025, a hedge fund manager with close ties to B. Riley, including a $600 million loan from the firm, was charged with criminal fraud. The news drove B. Riley's stock price down to under $3 per share.

== Education and early career ==
David Attended Northern Michigan University and the Aresty Institute of Executive Education at The Wharton School at the University of Pennsylvania. Before founding Wolfpack Research and other investment firms, David worked as a senior executive in the retail industry, including senior level positions at Finlay Enterprises, Midwest Famous Barr and Lord and Taylor.

== Investment career and activism ==
Dan David worked in various investment firms. He was Chief investment officer for F.G. Alpha Management, a hedge fund specialized in short stocks. In 2007, he co-founded GeoInvesting, a microcap stock research firm. Working out of Skippack, PA and an office in Manhattan, David has been credited with uncovering fraud in US-listed Chinese companies. David later lobbied Congress to change federal laws regarding the listing of China-based firms on U.S. stock exchanges.

In 2019, David founded Wolfpack Research, a short-selling research firm backed by Carson Block's Muddy Waters Capital. The company's ethos revolves around, as Block puts it, "uncovering financial fraud and other wrongdoing at public companies", in continuation of the public image David built himself in the 2018 documentary film The China Hustle and in his congressional run. However, critics point out that David "is still profiting from the losses of these companies, and it remains unclear as to what he is doing with this money."

He frequently appears in the business news media including on CNBC, Yahoo! Finance and Fox Business Network.

== 2018 Congressional campaign ==
In January 2018, David announced he would be entering the Republican primary to represent Pennsylvania’s newly formed 4th Congressional District, which includes Montgomery and Berks Counties. David became the Republican nominee but lost to the Democratic candidate, Madeleine Dean in the November 6th, 2018 general election.

== Personal life ==
David is a native of Flint, Michigan but has resided in Montgomery county, Pennsylvania, with his wife for more than 30 years. He credits some of his drive to pursue fraud and corporate wrongdoing in the financial markets from having witnessed personal devastation and poverty that resulted from broken corporate promises to the people of Flint.
