= The China Hustle =

- Poster
- Directed by: Jed Rothstein
- Written by: Jed Rothstein
- Produced by: Alex Gibney; Mark Cuban
- Narrated by: Dan David
- Distributed by: Magnolia Pictures
- Release date: September 8, 2017 (Toronto International Film Festival)
- Running time: 82 minutes
- Country: United States
- Language: English

The China Hustle is a 2017 financial documentary film produced by Magnolia Pictures and directed by Jed Rothstein. It reveals systematic and formulaic decades-long securities fraud by Chinese companies listed on the US stock market.

Many of the film's protagonists such as Dan David and Jon Carnes are activist shareholders and due diligence professionals who discovered the frauds, including fabricated accounting and brazen misrepresentations, and subsequently shorted the stock in order to bring about the collapse of the entities which often led to class action lawsuits, NASDAQ delistment, and SEC deregistration.

== Synopsis ==
After the 2008 financial crisis, as investment firms in the United States look for ways to improve clients' investment performance while earning money for themselves, they chance upon the idea of selling opportunities to unsuspecting Americans who want to get rich by participating in the "China growth story" but do not know much about the country or its companies. They do so by getting small nondescript Chinese companies (like Orient Paper and Advanced Battery Technologies (ABAT)) to do reverse mergers with defunct American companies (like Buffalo Mining) and thus get listed in the NYSE overnight. The hype that accompanies this is aided by paid guest appearances by the likes of Bill Clinton and Henry Kissinger at so called "investment conferences" organized by B-level investment firms (Roth Capital is one such firm featured in the documentary), thus adding a garb of respectability and reliability. The stocks of these companies see spikes, investment firms goad their investors into buying them, siphoning off brokerages on the way. When the prices of these stocks crash to their real value, unsuspecting savers are left holding large amounts of worthless stock in their 401(k)s.

The documentary investigates the collusion that occurred from 2008 to 2016 between second and third-tier US-based Wall Street investment firms such as Roth Capital Partners and small companies based in China. Most of the companies featured in the film were listed in NYSE through reverse mergers. The film reveals that the actual revenues of Chinese firms (reflected in their filings with Chinese government entities) were typically one-tenth of what was filed with the SEC. Subsequent to investigations, most of the firms were de-listed from the NYSE, resulting in losses of billions of dollars to US investors.

Information on the frauds was published in Chinese newspapers in 2010, including the online edition of Sina, but American investors were unaware of these as the articles were mostly in Chinese. Subsequently, the small research and investment firm Muddy Waters published translations of the Sina reports, but they did not receive much attention.

The film concludes with a closing sequence that highlights the continued lack of regulatory oversight in Chinese securities fraud. Out of approximately 400 Chinese companies, only one CEO went to jail for fraudulent reverse mergers. The film also suggests that Alibaba Group's and other existing Chinese firms' claims of high growth rates might be just as fraudulent.

=== Interviews ===
The documentary features interviews with investment bankers, whistleblowers like Dan David, who, after reading reports by the due diligence firm Muddy Waters Research, decided to short many hyped up penny stocks based in China. It also features interviews with journalists from Wall Street Journal and New York Times, Mitchell Nussbaum, the lawyer from Loeb & Loeb who represented the Chinese firms featured in the film, the investment banker who sold shares and issued "buy" recommendations on these stocks to his clients, retired U.S. Army General Wesley Clark, who was chairman of Rodman & Renshaw, another firm selling these stocks, and Paul Gills (a professor at Peking University). The documentary shows the issues that crop up when Big Four accounting firms Deloitte, EY, KPMG and PwC sign off audit reports done by their affiliates in China, which may not have completely been verified, but is the system that is followed by all large accounting firms across the world.

== Reception ==
The film premiered in 2017 at the Toronto Film Fest and was released on DVD and shown at the International Finance Centre in Hong Kong in April 2018.

Rotten Tomatoes gives the film rating of 74% based on reviews from 27 critics.

=== Favorable response ===
Forbes contributor Mark Hughes named it the "most important film of 2018" and described it as "a briskly paced, easy to understand, humanizing look at what is being called one of the biggest financial frauds in history."

Richard Whittaker of The Austin Chronicle rated it 3.5/5 and wrote: "The China Hustle culminates as a jaw-dropping examination of the willing blindness of investors, of how easily duped the business class is by a few parties, a few drinks, a couple of meet-and-greets with aging rock stars and aging politicos (no moment is more disturbing than retired general turned board-member-for-hire Wesley Clark, doing his best Sergeant Schultz "I know nothing!" routine). It's also an examination of a clash of business cultures – the gung-ho superficiality of the U.S., the dedication to opacity of China (as the saying goes, in clear water there is no fish) – and the depressing reality that the people making money out of all this are doing more to fix this system than the entities supposedly charged with oversight."

=== Critical response ===
Michael O'Sullivan of The Washington Post called it "a mildly engrossing if wonky exercise in what could be called a kind of selfish activism."

Ben Kenigsberg of the New York Times wrote that "with a rapidly paced barrage of talking heads and TV clips," "a documentary may simply be the wrong delivery mechanism for a byzantine exposé that cries out for detailed news reporting."

Barron's described it as a "must-see for scam fans" and wrote that it was worth seeing "for its reminder that the frauds were mostly exposed by hedge fund researchers who shorted the stocks and then blew the whistle."

Scott Tobias of Variety wrote: "The China Hustle” occasionally slides into the issue-doc template of talking heads and power-points, but it excels at drawing bar-stool anecdotes from financial rogues like David, ex-Bond employee Matthew Wiechert, and Carson Block, who runs a short-selling operation called Muddy Waters Research. There may not be anyone in Washington or on Wall Street willing to listen, but they relish telling their stories all the same."
