= Cotti Coffee =

Chinese coffeehouse chain

Cotti Coffee International Limited
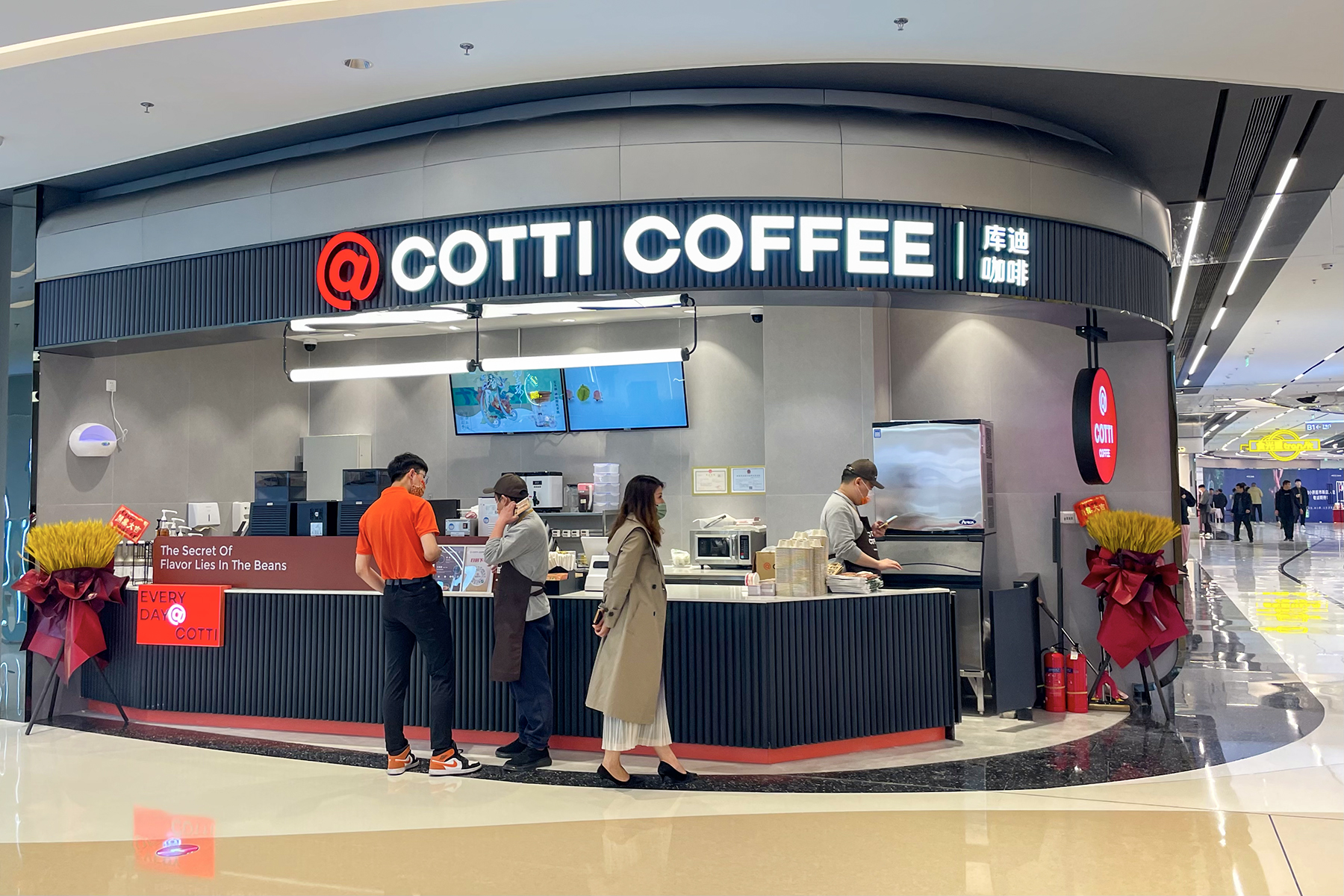
- Cotti Coffee at Grand Plaza, Zhengzhou, 2023
- Industry: Coffee shop
- Founded: August 2022; 4 years ago
- Founders: Lu Zhengyao; Qian Zhiya
- Headquarters: Suzhou, China
- Website: www.cotti.com

Cotti Coffee (Chinese: 库迪咖啡; pinyin: Kùdí Kāfēi) is a Chinese multinational chain of coffeehouses and convenience stores headquartered in Beijing, China. It was founded in 2022 by Lu Zhengyao and Qian Zhiya, who were formerly part of Luckin Coffee.

The company has expanded through a franchise-based model and operates thousands of stores across multiple countries. As of April 2026, the company has more than 18,000 stores in 28 countries and over 300 cities. It is known for its low-price strategy and large-scale store expansion in the Chinese coffee market.

== History ==
Cotti Coffee was formed after an accounting scandal at Luckin Coffee. In April 2020, Luckin Coffee admitted that between the second and fourth quarters of 2019, it engaged in fraudulent transactions which amounted to approximately 2.2 billion yuan. According to a Form 6-K filed by Luckin Coffee with the U.S. Securities and Exchange Commission (SEC) on 12 May 2020, the board of directors has removed Qian Zhiya and Liu Jian from their positions as CEO and COO, respectively, and Lu Zhengyao stepped down as chair of Luckin Coffee's Nominating and Corporate Governance Committee of the Board.

Lu and Qian then formed Cotti Coffee, opening their first store in Fuzhou, Fujian on 22 October 2022. Cotti Coffee announced that it would expand through a fully franchise-based model, collecting service fees based on the stores' gross profits rather than traditional franchise fees. From 1 March 2026, Cotti Coffee will suspend franchise applications in major cities (including municipalities directly under the central government and provincial capitals). The company will establish a number of flagship stores to further enhance the customer experience.

== Locations ==
Cotti Coffee stores are mostly concentrated in China. By 2026, the company had more than 18,000 stores in Asia and Europe, with the majority located in China. Other Asian locations include South Korea, Indonesia (Jakarta), Japan (Tokyo), Hong Kong, Thailand (Bangkok), Malaysia (Johor Bahru), the Philippines, and Singapore. In Europe, its stores are located in France, Germany, Spain, England, Belgium, the Netherlands and Portugal, with plans to expand to Italy.

== Products ==
Cotti Coffee's products include milk coffee, tea coffee, rice milk coffee, and non-coffee beverages, with variations across geographic regions. Other in-store products include light meals, instant coffee, and branded merchandise.

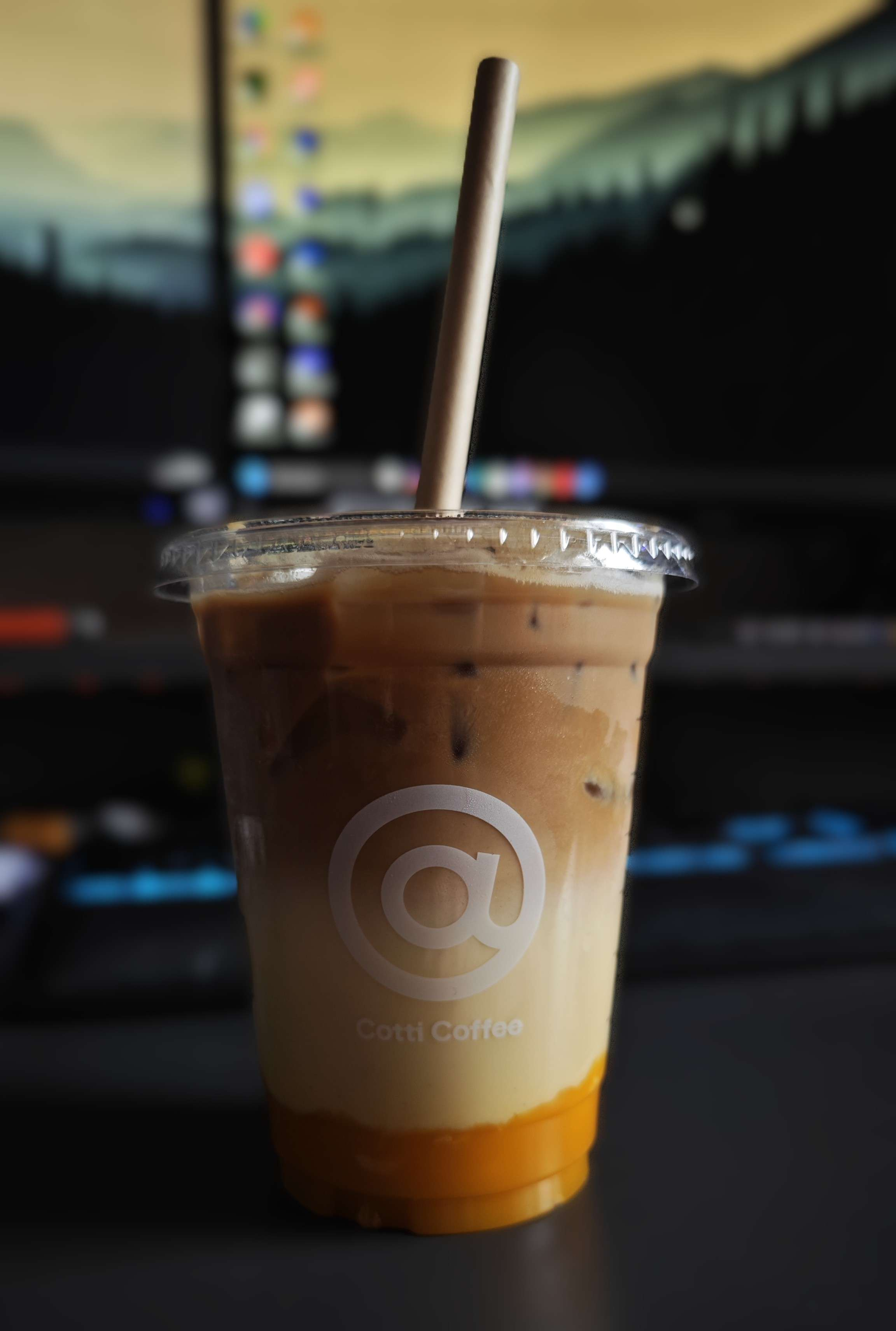
Cotti Coffee Mango Coco Latte

== Competition ==
Cotti Coffee faces intense competition in China’s coffee market, particularly from domestic chains such as Luckin Coffee. The two companies compete across multiple areas, including store expansion, pricing strategies, product offerings, and brand positioning.

In terms of expansion, Cotti Coffee has pursued rapid growth through a franchise-based model and set a target of reaching 50,000 stores in 2025. By 2024, the company had already surpassed 10,000 stores globally. In contrast, Luckin Coffee has expanded its market through with a combination of self-operated and franchise stores.

In terms of products and prices, both target the mass consumer market and provide standardised coffee products such as Coconut Milk Latte and Cheese Latte. Their store location strategies often overlap, with outlets frequently opening in close proximity to increase market coverage.

Cotti Coffee has also expanded its marketing strategy by introducing the convenience store and "store-in-store" models, including embedding outlets in convenience stores, food and beverage venues, and high-traffic retail locations. However, this approach faces competitions from the already mature retail and convenience store in China.

== Business strategy ==
Cotti Coffee's business strategy prioritizes low prices and rapid expansion. The company conducts low price promotions such as '9.9 yuan coffee'. At the same time, it adopts the franchise model to promote the growth in the number of stores. For example, the company announced a plan to reach 50,000 stores by the end of 2025.

Low-price promotions are part of the company's mixed pricing strategy of 'special discount + regular prices.'. At the same time, the company cooperates with delivery platforms to improve operational efficiency.

In an attempt to build its global reputation, Cotti Coffee became one of the sponsors of the Argentinian national football team. The company also partnered with brands such as Garfield, Honor of Kings, SpongeBob SquarePants, and Spy × Family.

== See also ==
- List of coffeehouse chains
