= Jim Chanos =

Greek-American businessman (born 1957)

- Born: December 24, 1957 (age 68); Milwaukee, Wisconsin, U.S.
- Education: Yale University (BA)
- Occupation: Investor
- Known for: Short selling
- Notable work: Founder of Kynikos Associates, LP
- Children: 4

James Steven Chanos (born December 24, 1957) is a Greek-American investment manager and president/founder of Kynikos Associates, a New York City registered investment advisor focused on short selling. He is known for predicting the fall of Enron before its collapse. He has been nicknamed the "Darth Vader of Wall Street", the "Catastrophe Capitalist" and the "LeBron James of short selling". Chanos is a noted art collector.

== Early life and education ==
James Steven Chanos was born in 1957 into a Greek immigrant family living in Milwaukee, Wisconsin, that operated a chain of dry-cleaning shops. He graduated from Wylie E. Groves High School in Beverly Hills, Michigan. He received a Bachelor of Arts degree, double-majoring in economics and political science from Yale University in 1980.

== Career ==
Chanos began his career at brokerage firm Gilford Securities in 1982. While at Gilford, he performed a cash-flow analysis and made a sell recommendation that ultimately exposed Baldwin-United, which filed for bankruptcy in 1983. Shortly thereafter, Chanos was recruited to Deutsche Bank, where he analyzed Michael Milken's junk bonds and Drexel Burnham Lambert.

After working as an analyst in several firms, Chanos founded Kynikos (Greek for "cynic") in 1985 with $16 million, as a firm specializing in short selling. One critical position he took at Kynikos was the shorting of Enron.

He describes his investment strategy as "intensive research into stocks", looking for fundamental failures in market valuation, from underestimated or unreported failings in the business or the market of a particular stock, followed by a substantial short position which he is willing to hold for quite a long time — perhaps an opposite echo to Warren Buffett's reputed "fundamentals+long stay" investment strategy. Some have said his commitment serves as whistle-blowing more than do most speculations, as in his heavy shortselling of such companies as Baldwin-United and Enron Corporation.

Throughout the 2010s, Chanos and other short sellers faced a tough environment during a booming period for M&A and a record amount of share reacquisitions. A New York Times profile of several short sellers in 2015 described Chanos and others as "waiting in the wings" for the bull market to end. The same profile described Chanos's Kynikos Associates as losing more than half its value in the last five years from $6 billion to $2.5 billion, compelling Chanos to pitch "a new fund to investors that will take a portfolio of long positions and overlay the firm's traditional short portfolio". Chanos's personal net worth in 2016 was estimated at $1.5 billion (equivalent to $2.01 billion in 2025).

2020 was an especially terrible year for Chanos and other short sellers, according to Institutional Investor, calling their firms "a shadow of their former selves." The magazine noted Kynikos ended 2020 with $405 million (equivalent to $504 million in 2025) in assets, compared to $2 billion in 2018.

In November 2023, The Wall Street Journal reported that Chanos would close his hedge fund and return outside capital to investors by the end of the year. At the time of publication, the S&P500 was up nearly 20% year-to-date, and Tesla, a notable short position of Chanos' fund, was up nearly 117%.

== Investments ==
=== Enron collapse ===
Chanos gained notoriety as a short seller when he predicted the fall of Enron before it filed for bankruptcy in 2001. He was a short seller of Enron throughout 2001, increasing his short position as more information surfaced. Kynikos profited from the trade.

=== Chinese real estate crash ===
Chanos has frequently made comments predicting a Chinese real estate crash. In January 2010, the New York Times reported that Chanos predicted an impending Chinese economic crash that would resemble "Dubai times 1,000 — or worse". Later, on the Charlie Rose Show in April 2010, he maintained that China was on a "treadmill to hell" that would lead to a crash driven by a "world-class" property bubble.

The Chinese real estate crash predicted in 2010 did not materialize, and has caused financial media to question his investment wisdom. Bloomberg in a December 2017 article noted "Chanos has made wayward bets against U.S. stocks and China recently". The Financial Times in an October 2017 article used his "Dubai times 1,000" quote an example of one of the "dire prophecies" about China's real estate market that did not come true, demonstrating the subject was "tricky for foreign investors and experts to grasp". The Economist in a January 2021 article on the Chinese property boom observed housing prices doubled and "enough homes have been built for 250m people" since Chanos likened Chinese real estate to "Dubai on steroids". According to the Economist, the failure of the prediction of a crash suggested the market is "more complex than its depiction as a bubble."

In a September 2021 New York Times article on the Chinese property sector crisis (2020–present), it was noted "...Jim Chanos, a prominent American investor, warned that China's real-estate excesses had placed it on a 'treadmill to hell' and that the bubble might burst at any point. But the bubble did not burst in 2010. It did not burst in 2011, nor has it burst in the decade since — unless, that is, it's starting to do so this week."

In an October 2021 interview, Chanos again predicted an impending real estate crash in China. There would be "no historical analog", according to Chanos. "Maybe Tokyo in '89? But this is worse than that. It's worse than Spain in '06 or Ireland in '06."

=== Chinese economy and stocks ===
Chanos has held a critical view of the Chinese economy since 2009-10, around the time when he began issuing dire predictions about China's real estate market. In September 2009 on CNBC, Chanos said the Chinese miracle economy was "getting harder and harder to believe", predicting the country would head the way of the "old Soviet Union".

By 2015, bearish positions on Chinese stocks made up about one-fifth of the holdings in Kynikos's global funds. The firm made gains when Chinese stocks tumbled during the 2015–2016 Chinese stock market turbulence.

Later on in the 2010s, Chanos reduced his firm's bets against the Chinese stock market. During a Schechter Wealth forum event in December 2017 he noted, "in the past few years...we've reduced our China short and our global fund to the lowest its been".

In September 2023, Chanos explained his firm no longer heavily shorts the Chinese market, a shift from his approach 10-12 years ago because China's stock market has "basically been flat for over 12 years", diminishing its appeal for shorting. During an interview with Bloomberg Television in September 2023, he clarified that his position was not that the Chinese economy would be in "smoking ruins". Still, he would have to "downshift its growth" from an investment-driven model to a consumption- or service-driven model, with severe "speed bumps" along the way.

=== Caterpillar ===
At the CNBC Institutional Investor Delivering Alpha Conference in 2013, Chanos revealed his firm was short on Caterpillar Inc. Chanos explained that Caterpillar had enjoyed a "once in a generation, if not once in a lifetime" boom in infrastructure investment because of China's buildout, which was coming to an end. In 2016, Chanos maintained on CNBC that his firm was still betting against Caterpillar. Chanos stated the "collapse has not happened" because the Chinese debt and real estate bubble had not yet popped.

=== Tesla Inc. ===
Chanos has been bearish on Tesla Inc since 2013 but announced a short position in 2016. Between 2015 and 2021, Tesla stock increased by over 2,200%. In 2020, Chanos's fund suffered massive losses due to his short position against Tesla: "Kynikos ended 2020 with about $405 million in [assets under management], down from around $932 million the prior year according to annual ADV filings with the Securities and Exchange Commission." In a 2020 interview, Chanos claimed to be still short Tesla but admitted the staggering losses have "been painful, clearly". In 2023, he said his firm remained short Tesla, describing the same headwinds from his previous years of shorting: shrinking margins and increased competition.

=== Luckin Coffee ===
Chanos took and closed a short position on Luckin Coffee Inc. in 2020 on the advice of fellow short-seller Carson Block of Muddy Waters Research. The stock dropped 70% in April 2020 after the company disclosed in a securities filing that its chief operating officer had fabricated about 2.2 billion yuan ($310 million) of reported 2019 sales. Chanos remarked on CNBC, "How many times do investors have to be burned in these companies that are just too good to be true? Growing 40% to 50% a year with all kinds of odd transactions with affiliates."

=== Wirecard AG ===
Chanos took and closed a short position on Wirecard AG. Wirecard AG's stock dropped about 96% in June 2020 after its auditor, EY, disclosed that it was missing about $2.1 billion. Wirecard announced that the $2.1 billion (€1.9 billion) likely doesn't exist. On Bloomberg, Chanos said that he believes that "Wirecard was never profitable."

=== The Hertz Corporation ===
Chanos took and closed a short position on The Hertz Corporation. Chanos covered his short position before the Hertz bankruptcy. Chanos remarked about his closed short position on Hertz that he did not believe it would survive the next recession.

=== Beyond Meat ===
Chanos holds a short position against Beyond Meat. Chanos remarked on a Financial Times article, "'Beyond Meat' still trades at 10 times revenues. This is a company that's still priced for perfection here. The market trades at 2.5 times revenue, and successful consumer companies trade at 4 times revenue." Chanos remarked further, stating "Beyond Meat has ceased to be a growth company". The stock was down 54% since its IPO as of July 2022, amid investor concerns about increasing pressure on Beyond Meat's margins.

== Personal life ==
Chanos lives in Florida. He is a lecturer in finance and a Becton Fellow at the Yale School of Management, where he teaches a class on the history of financial fraud. He is a trustee of the Nightingale-Bamford School and the New York Historical Society and previously served as president of the board of The Browning School. He has four children.
