= Advanced Battery Technologies =

Advanced Battery Technologies, Inc
- Industry: Electric vehicles rechargeable lithium-ion batteries
- Founded: 2002
- Headquarters: New York City
- Key people: Zhiguo Fu (CEO)
- Revenue: ▲US$ 106.22 million (2011)
- Operating income: ▲US$ 37.84 million (2011)
- Net income: ▲US$ 36.71 million (2011)
- Number of employees: 1,176

Advanced Battery Technologies Inc (Ticker: ABAT) was a publicly traded NASDAQ company with executive offices in Harbin, China, and Flushing, New York, with three other manufacturing campuses in mainland China (Dongguan, Wuxi and Harbin) that specialized in the development and manufacturing/assembly of rechargeable polymer lithium-ion (PLI) batteries and electric vehicles, electric bikes and electric scooters.

== Products and technologies ==
Advanced Battery Technologies was most known for its development and manufacturing of lithium iron phosphate batteries. ABAT manufactured customized mini golf carts and shuttles, Electric bicycles, PLI batteries for electric buses and E-scooters fitted with unique lithium iron phosphate batteries. According to Market Wire, the batteries combined "high-energy chemistry with state-of-the-art polymer technology to overcome many of the shortcomings associated with other types of rechargeable batteries".

== Market penetration ==
ABAT sold its product lines across the globe, mostly as generic and re-branded product. ABAT consisted of three campuses in China, in Harbin, Wuxi, and Dongguan. The facilities in Harbin and Dongguan manufactured small and large PLI battery cells and the facility in Wuxi assembled electric bikes and scooters. ABAT touted a massive $85,000,000-dollar opening of its plant in Dongguan and was hyped in United States and Chinese media at the time. Prior to ceasing operations, ABAT's scooter line contained numerous models and prototypes, which were re-branded and sold under many brands such as Jinan Qingqi, Lynx, Ecobahn, Wuxi Huina and several others. ABAT's generic models such as ZQTD-690 were listed in its catalogue and displayed in its warehouses.

In Spain, Wuxi scooters sold under the ABAT name through ABAT CONNECTION company in Alicante, Spain as a gateway to the European market before dissolving. In Denmark, Wuxi was re-branded as Lynx Scooters, in Russia under the Ecobahn name, and in Poland under Pollana. Other distributors and re-sellers are found in The Netherlands, Slovenia, Czech Republic, Italy, Turkey, India, and Singapore.

== Notable activities ==
- In May 2009 ABAT acquired Wuxi Angell Autocycle, an electric and hybrid electric scooter and E Bike manufacturer based in Wuxi, China. Previous to the acquisition ABAT was an investor and supplier to Wuxi Angell, providing batteries, engines, controllers and other parts to the company.
- In June 2011 ABAT signed a $14.7 million deal to supply 24,000 electric vehicles, including motorized bicycles and scooters, to Wuxi Hao Jie Vehicle Co.

== Allegations of fraud ==
In March 2011 anonymous bloggers who, by their own admission, stood to gain if ABAT's stock price declined, accused the company of fraudulently misrepresenting its business interests – pointing out discrepancies between Advanced Battery Technologies filings with the Securities and Exchange Commission and China's State Administration of Industry and Commerce, while also questioning the reliability of distributor relationships and related party transactions. Articles followed on financial opinion and analysis sites. While no fraud was ever proven, and a formal rebuttal was issued, the company failed to file its third quarter 2011 financial statements and was subsequently de-listed from trading on the NASDAQ exchange. The events inspired the 2017 finance documentary The China Hustle.

== See also ==
- Sino-Forest Corporation
- Focus Media Holding
- N share
