= Olam International =

Nigerian agriculture company listed in SGX

Olam International Limited
- Type: Public company
- Traded as: SGX: VC2
- Industry: Agri-business
- Founded: Nigeria (1989)
- Headquarters: 7 Straits View, Marina One East Tower, Marina South, Singapore
- Key people: Yap Chee Keong (Chairperson); Gautam Wadhwa (CEO)
- Revenue: ▲ S$67.0 billion (2025)
- Operating income: ▲ S$1,423 million (2021)
- Net income: ▲ S$686 million (2021)
- Total assets: ▲ S$32.060 billion (2021)
- Total equity: ▲ S$6.771 billion (2021)
- Owner: Temasek Holdings (54%); Mitsubishi Corporation (17%)
- Number of employees: 82,000+ (2021)
- Divisions: Olam Food Ingredients (OFI); Olam Global Agri (OGA)
- Website: www.olamgroup.com

Olam International is a Nigerian-founded agri-business company, operating in 60 countries and supplying food and industrial raw materials to over 20,900 customers worldwide, placing them among the world's largest suppliers of cocoa beans, coffee, cotton and rice. Its value chain includes farming, origination, processing and distribution operations, child labor, and allegedly even child slavery.

== History ==
In 1989, the Kewalram Chanrai Group established Olam Nigeria Plc to set up a non-oil based export operation out of Nigeria to secure hard currency earnings to meet the foreign exchange requirements of the other Group Companies operating in Nigeria. The success of this operation resulted in Olam establishing an independent export operation and sourcing and exporting other agricultural products. The Group's agri-business was headquartered in London until 1996, and operated under the name of "Chanrai International Limited". The business began with the export of cashews from Nigeria and then expanded into exports of cotton, cocoa and sheanuts from Nigeria.

=== Move to Singapore ===
Between 1993 and 1995, the business grew from a single operation into multiple origins, first within West Africa, and then to East Africa and India. The move into multiple origin countries coincided with the deregulation of the agricultural commodity markets.

Olam International Limited was incorporated in Singapore on 4 July 1995 as a public limited company. In 1996, at the invitation of the Singapore Trade Development Board (now Enterprise Singapore), Olam relocated their entire operations from London to Singapore. Furthermore, the Singapore Government awarded Olam the Approved International Trader status (now called the Global Trader Programme) under which Olam was granted a concessionary tax rate of 10%, which was subsequently reduced, in 2004, to 5%. On relocation to Singapore, the Group's agri-business was reorganised to be wholly owned by Olam International Limited in Singapore.

=== IPO ===
In 2002, AIF Capital became the first external investor to take an equity stake in the company. In 2003, Singapore's state-owned Temasek Holdings, through its wholly owned subsidiary Seletar Investments, took a stake in Olam, followed by International Finance Corporation (IFC). On 11 February 2005, Olam International Limited was listed on the main board of the Singapore Exchange. In 2007, Olam acquired Queensland Cotton, including its American subsidiary Anderson Clayton. Temasek made a further investment in Olam in 2009.

As of December 2014, following a Voluntary General Offer Temasek held close to 80% of Olam. By 2020 this had reduced to 53.4%. In 2015 Mitsubishi Corporation acquired a shareholding of 20% making them the second largest shareholder.

The management team of Olam has a shareholding in the company approximating 6.3% of the total issued share capital. Olam's free float owned by public shareholders accounts for approximately 15.9% of the total issued share capital in 2020.

The group's food-ingredients division, OFI, had planned an IPO in late 2022, which was delayed due to the volatility caused by the Russian invasion of Ukraine.

=== Possible merger and divestment ===
In 2010, Olam International discussed a possible merger with one of its main competitors; Geneva-based Louis Dreyfus Company, the world's largest cotton and rice trading company. This idea was abandoned in early 2011.

Olam announced in July 2013, that it would sell its cotton assets in Zimbabwe, with the preferred buyer being a private equity company.

In 2019, the company announced plans to sell its sugar, rubber, wood products and fertiliser units.

=== Restructuring ===
In January 2020, Olam International announced division of its portfolio of diverse products into two new operating businesses, Olam Food Ingredients (OFI) and Olam Global Agri (OGA). The decision followed from its 2019 business review, and a multi-year plan announced early in 2019 to invest US$3.5 billion into key growth areas, such as edible nuts, coffee and cocoa, while shedding other sectors. In the statement released by the firm, Olam Food Ingredients (OFI), will consist of its cocoa, coffee, edible nuts, spices and dairy businesses, Olam Global Agri (OGA) will include grains and animal feed, edible oils, rice, cotton and commodity financial services.

In August 2026, Olam sold a 44.58% stake in their agribusiness unit Olam Global Agri for US$1.88 billion(approximately S$2.4 billion) and plans to reduced net debt with deleveraging and implement growth initiatives within ofi and remaining Olam group (OGH).

== Community involvement ==
=== Child labor ===
In 2020, Olam Cocoa, a subsidiary of Olam International, rolled out a new initiative in partnership with the Fair Labor Association (FLA) and local cocoa farming cooperatives "to digitally register its nearly 7,000 farmer suppliers in Cameroon and their households." This also include introducing "rigorous traceability and reporting systems, educating local communities about child labor, as well as setting up dedicated child labor monitoring and remediation systems (CLMRS)." In 2018/2019, Olam found more than 7,000 instances of inappropriate child labor in its supply chain, remediating approximately 70% of them. This is the first instance of professional application of such initiatives at such a scale in Cameroon. Forward, the company plans to expand its initiative to cover nearly 223,000 farmers in three countries across West Africa.

=== Sustainable Rice Platform (SRP) ===
Olam International currently one of the founding members of the Sustainable Rice Platform (SRP), a multi-stakeholder platform, co-convened by United Nations Environmental Programme (UNEP) and the International Rice Research Institute to promote resource efficiency and sustainable trade flows, production and consumption operations, and supply chains in the global rice sector.

=== Sustainable cocoa initiatives ===
in order to improve crop yields in its network, Olam Cocoa has implemented a digital information system called Olam Farmer Information System (OFIS) to collect data from more than 160,000 cocoa farmers across 20 countries, tracking a range of farm level data points including cocoa tree age and soil type. For the 2020 growing season, Olam Cocoa has joined a program with the Ghana Cocoa Board (COCOBOD) to distribute locally sourced fertilizer to cocoa farmers in its cocoa sourcing operations in that country.

== Allegations ==
=== Deforestation-linked palm oil, cocoa, and rubber ===
Between 2011 and 2015, Olam's palm oil trade volume grew by approximately twenty times—from 71,000 tons to 1.53 million tons. Despite Olam's stated commitment to RSPO-certified palm oil, the company shunned transparency as it expanded its palm oil production.

A report released by the NGO Mighty Earth and Gabon-based NGO Brainforest on 12 December 2016 revealed that Olam was operating a secretive palm oil trading operation worldwide, particularly with its third party suppliers in Asia. Olam was accused of endangering the forest habitats of gorillas, chimpanzees and forest elephants due to widespread deforestation. It was revealed that in Gabon, Olam had cut 26,000 hectares (64,000 acres) of forest for palm oil.

The photos and videos featured in the NGO report show Olam bulldozing Gabonese rainforests for rubber and to establish what they intended to build as Africa's largest palm oil plantation. The analysis found that in Gabon, Olam cleared approximately 26,000 hectares of forest across its four palm oil concessions since 2012 and additional forests for rubber.

The two NGOs also documented Olam's cutting down an area the size of Washington DC in what had been an intact forest landscape in Northern Gabon, for rubber in Gabon.

On 16 December 2016, shortly after the report was released, Mighty Earth submitted a formal complaint against Olam to the Forest Stewardship Council (FSC) for Olam's deforestation and for violating FSC policies. In response to these allegations, on 21 February 2017, Olam suspended further land clearing of forests in Gabon for at least a year. As a result, Mighty Earth suspended its campaign.

The agreement between Mighty Earth and Olam was renewed in 2018. In its inaugural Excellence Awards in 2019, the industry-led Roundtable on Sustainable Palm Oil recognized Olam International for its conservation leadership in developing sustainable palm oil plantations having a positive impact on forest conservation, species conservation and emission reduction in Gabon.

On 13 September 2017 NGO Mighty Earth released a second report documenting findings that Olam purchases cocoa grown illegally in national parks and other protected forests in the Ivory Coast. The report accused Olam of endangering the forest habitats of chimpanzees, elephants and other wildlife populations by purchasing cocoa linked to deforestation. As a result of cocoa production, 7 of the 23 Ivorian protected areas have been almost entirely converted to cocoa. Olam was notified of the findings of Mighty Earth's investigation and did not deny that the company sourced its cocoa from protected areas in the Ivory Coast.

In 2020 the FSC, Olam and Mighty Earth commissioned SmartCert Group to perform a retrospective assessment of previous deforestation for Olam's palm oil plantations in Gabon. A second investigation will focus on Olam's rubber plantations in Gabon.

=== Muddy Waters allegations ===
In November 2012, Carson Block of Muddy Waters Research accused Olam of "deciding to take huge leverage and invest in illiquid positions", questioning its accounting practices and accusing its board of an "abject failure of leadership". Olam called the allegations "baseless rumour-mongering" and sued Block for libel, but its shares nevertheless fell 21%.

=== Forced evictions and land clearance in Laos ===
The company is involved in the production of coffee in Laos and the clearance of forests and villages to plant large plantations. Areas of land that were acquired by the company were previously inhabited and farmed by villagers who had paid their land taxes and were also farming coffee alongside other products. Compensation was only partly paid, with many evicted landholders being paid only in rice. Many landholders are now facing challenges to grow enough food to survive. This development of large industrial plantations at the sacrifice of the small holding family unit is argued by some to be counterproductive to the development of Laos; as it reduces the overall agricultural productivity; and increases poverty amongst the families, while a few officials and the company benefit.

=== Child slavery ===
In 2021, Olam International was named in a class action lawsuit filed by eight former child slaves from Mali who allege that the company aided and abetted their enslavement on cocoa plantations in Ivory Coast. The suit accused Olam (along with Nestlé, Cargill, Mars, Incorporated, Barry Callebaut, The Hershey Company, and Mondelez International) of knowingly engaging in forced labor, and the plaintiffs sought damages for unjust enrichment, negligent supervision, and intentional infliction of emotional distress.

In June 2022, the United States District Court for the District of Columbia dismissed the case for lack of standing. In July 2025, the United States Court of Appeals for the District of Columbia Circuit affirmed the dismissal, holding that the plaintiffs had not plausibly alleged that Olam and the other defendants sourced cocoa from the farms where the plaintiffs were forced to work.

== See also ==
- Commodity markets
- Nestle
- Noble
- Wilmar
