= Joshua Mitts =

American legal scholar

Academic background
- Education: Georgetown University (BA); Yale University (JD); Columbia University (PhD)

Academic work
- Discipline: Securities law, Free Expression and Civil Rights on Campus
- Institutions: Columbia Law School

Joshua Mitts is an American legal scholar. He is an associate professor of law and Milton Handler Fellow at Columbia Law School. He is known for his research into short activism and what he alleged are its market abuses.

== Biography ==
Mitts received his B.A. in Liberal Studies from Georgetown University in 2010, J.D. from Yale Law School, and Ph.D. from Columbia Business School in 2018.

He joined the Columbia Law School faculty in 2017. Mitts said that the 2021 GameStop short squeeze was case of traders banding together to take down hedge funds.

In 2022, Mitts published a number of analyses on online trading data and the online presence of short sellers and claimed that certain players were manipulating the market. Mitts pointed to what he said were potentially manipulative and illicit trading activities and alleged securities fraud by investors.

Mitts' work was considered in federal probes into certain activist short sellers such as Carson Block and certain hedge funds such as Block's Muddy Waters Research that published negative reports on certain companies, which lowered their stock price. In 2022, Block wrote a white paper entitled "Distorting the Shorts," in which he said that Mitts had written research that was “greatly flawed, possibly to the point of being fraudulent”. He called the work by Mitts "a non-empirical, conflict-laden polemic based on misrepresentation, selective presentation of data, and lack of academic integrity. In 2024, The New York Times reported that the SEC had informed Block that it did not intend to file any charges against Block.

In 2023, Mitts co-wrote a research article asserting a potential link between people he alleged had foreknowledge of the October 7 Hamas attack on Israel and shorting of an ETF that tracks Israeli stocks. The head of trading at the Tel Aviv Stock Exchange criticized what he called the report’s "flawed analysis", pointing out among other things that the Mitts report was 100 times off when it cited price movements using shekels, while in fact the data was referring to agorot, worth one-hundredth of a shekel (and thus the Mitts report overstated its findings a hundred-fold), and said "This is a flawed analysis from the outset and there is a lack of understanding of how the local market operates ... There was nothing unusual in short positions in the stock exchange in the two months before the attack." Also at odds with the conclusions of the Mitts report, the Israel Securities Authority said "examinations found ... that the average short balances for shares traded on the Tel-Aviv Stock Exchange declined during the period preceding October 7th."

As of 2024, Mitts was an adviser to the campus group Law Students Against Antisemitism.
