= Blue Bottle Coffee =

American coffee roasting and retailing company

Blue Bottle Coffee, Inc.

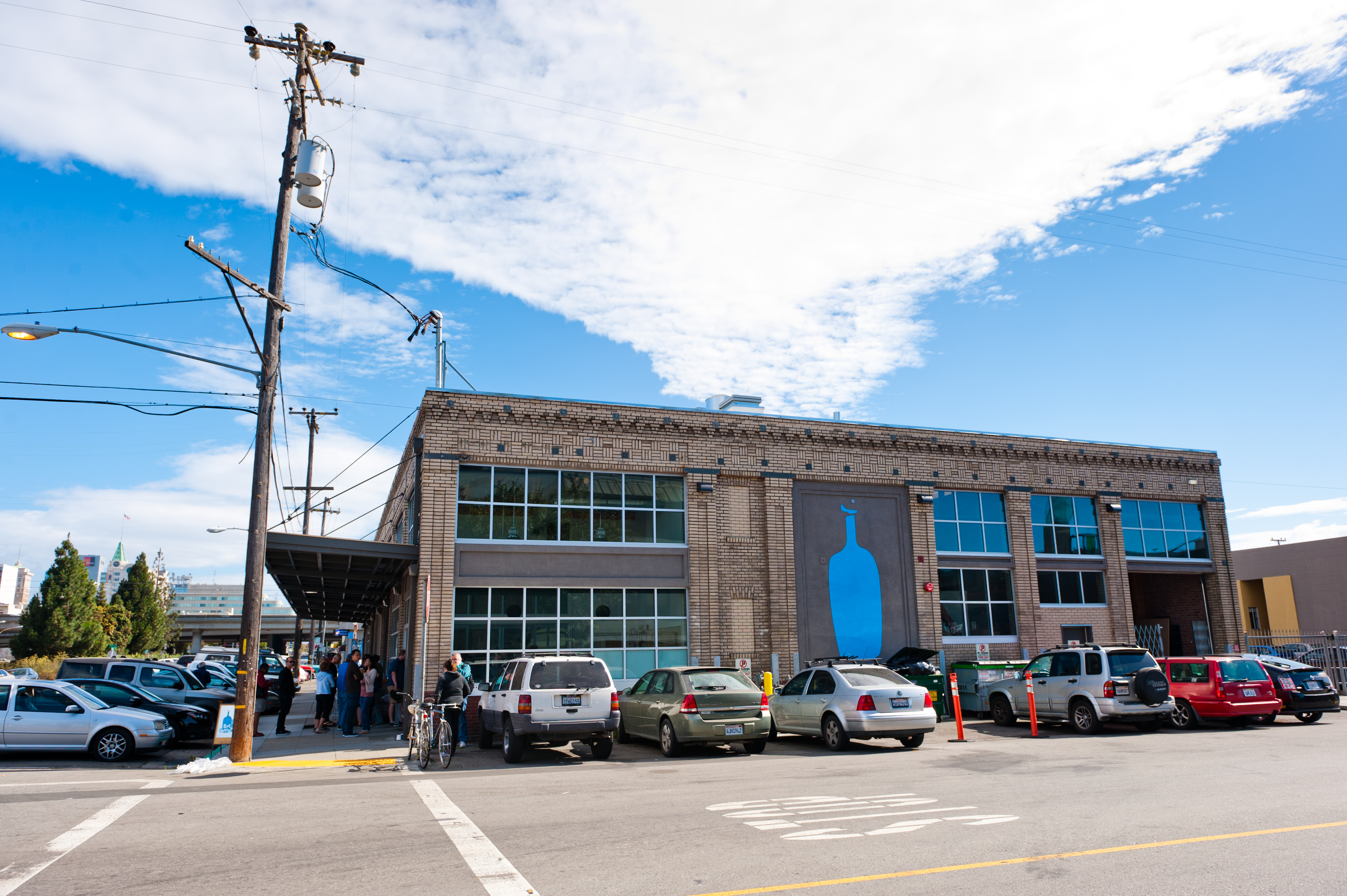
- former Blue Bottle facility in Oakland
- Type: Private
- Industry: Coffee industry
- Founded: 2002; 24 years ago
- Founder: W. James Freeman
- Headquarters: Oakland, California, U.S.
- Number of locations: 150
- Area served: United States
- Key people: W. James Freeman, Founder; Karl Strovink, CEO
- Owner: Centurium Capital
- Website: bluebottlecoffee.com

Blue Bottle Coffee, Inc., is a coffee roaster and retailer once headquartered in Oakland, California, United States. In 2017, a majority stake in the company was acquired by Nestlé (68%). In 2026, Chinese private equity firm Centurium Capital acquired Blue Bottle's global retail operations from Nestlé for approximately $400 million. Blue Bottle Coffee is a major player in third wave coffee. As of 2013, the company focused on single-origin beans.

== Locations ==
Originating in Oakland, California, the company soon expanded to other areas around the country. Blue Bottle first expanded to several cafés in locations around San Francisco, including the Ferry Building and the San Francisco Museum of Modern Art's rooftop garden. The company operates 150 stores as of October 2026, with locations in California, New York, Washington, D.C., Boston, Chicago, Seoul, Jeju City, Kyoto, Kobe, Tokyo, Osaka, Yokohama, Hong Kong, Shanghai and Singapore.

== History ==
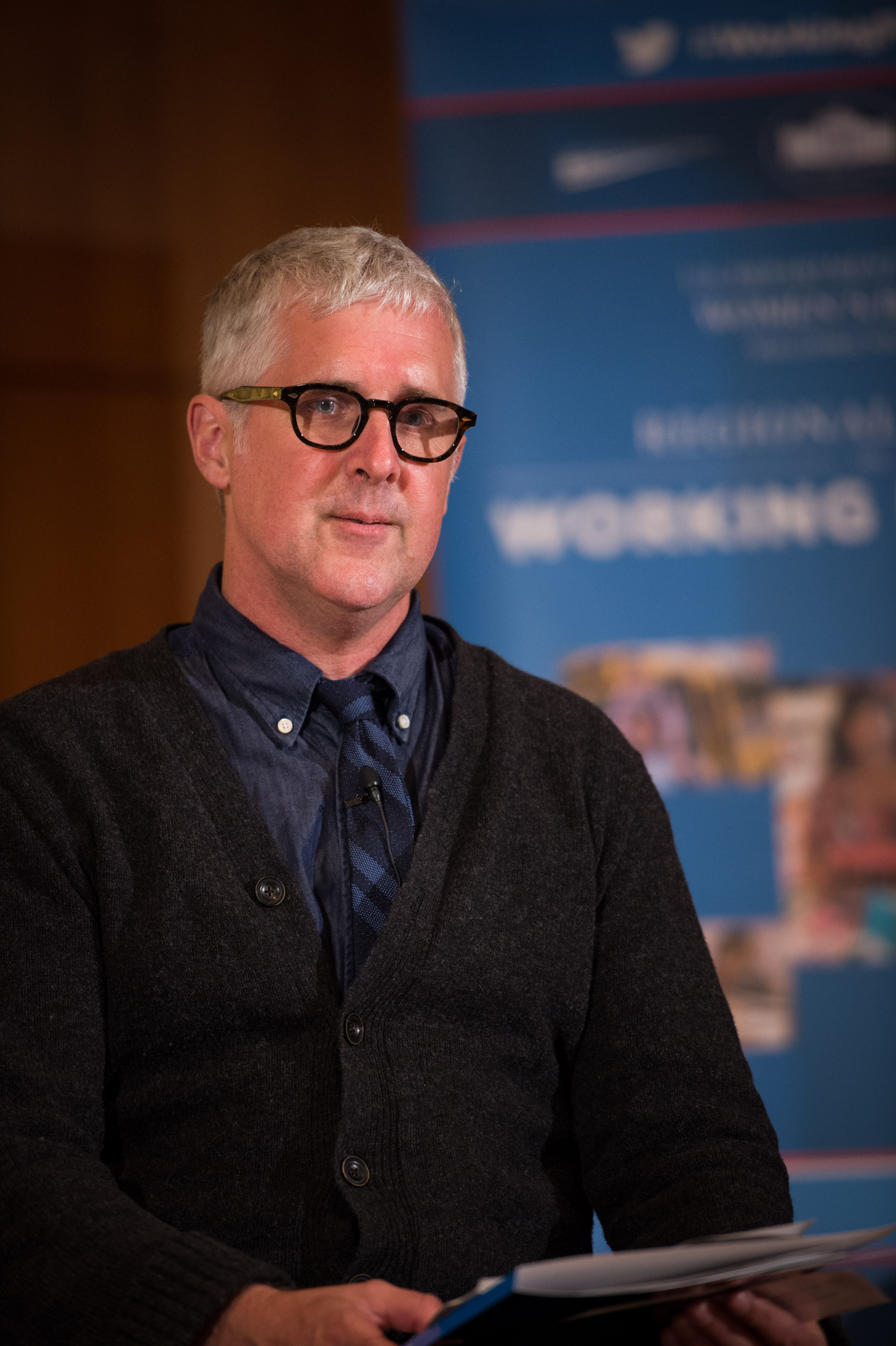
W. James Freeman, CEO of Blue Bottle Coffee, in 2014

W. James Freeman founded Blue Bottle Coffee in the early 2000s in Oakland's Temescal District. Freeman borrowed the name from one of Europe's first cafés, The Blue Bottle Coffee House. Initially, he intended to roast coffee in small batches (6 lbs. per roast) to sell within 24 hours of roasting, as a home-delivery service. Blue Bottle soon ceased deliveries and opened as a traditional café.

Blue Bottle opened additional locations in San Francisco and elsewhere in the San Francisco Bay Area and opened its first New York location in Williamsburg, Brooklyn, in 2010. The company-owned stores carry off-menu items such as the "Gibraltar", a form of cortado.

In 2012, Blue Bottle received $20 million in venture capital investment, led by True Ventures. In January 2014, Blue Bottle raised $25.75 million in a new round of funding. In 2015, Blue Bottle completed a venture capital round in which it raised $70 million from investors led by Fidelity.

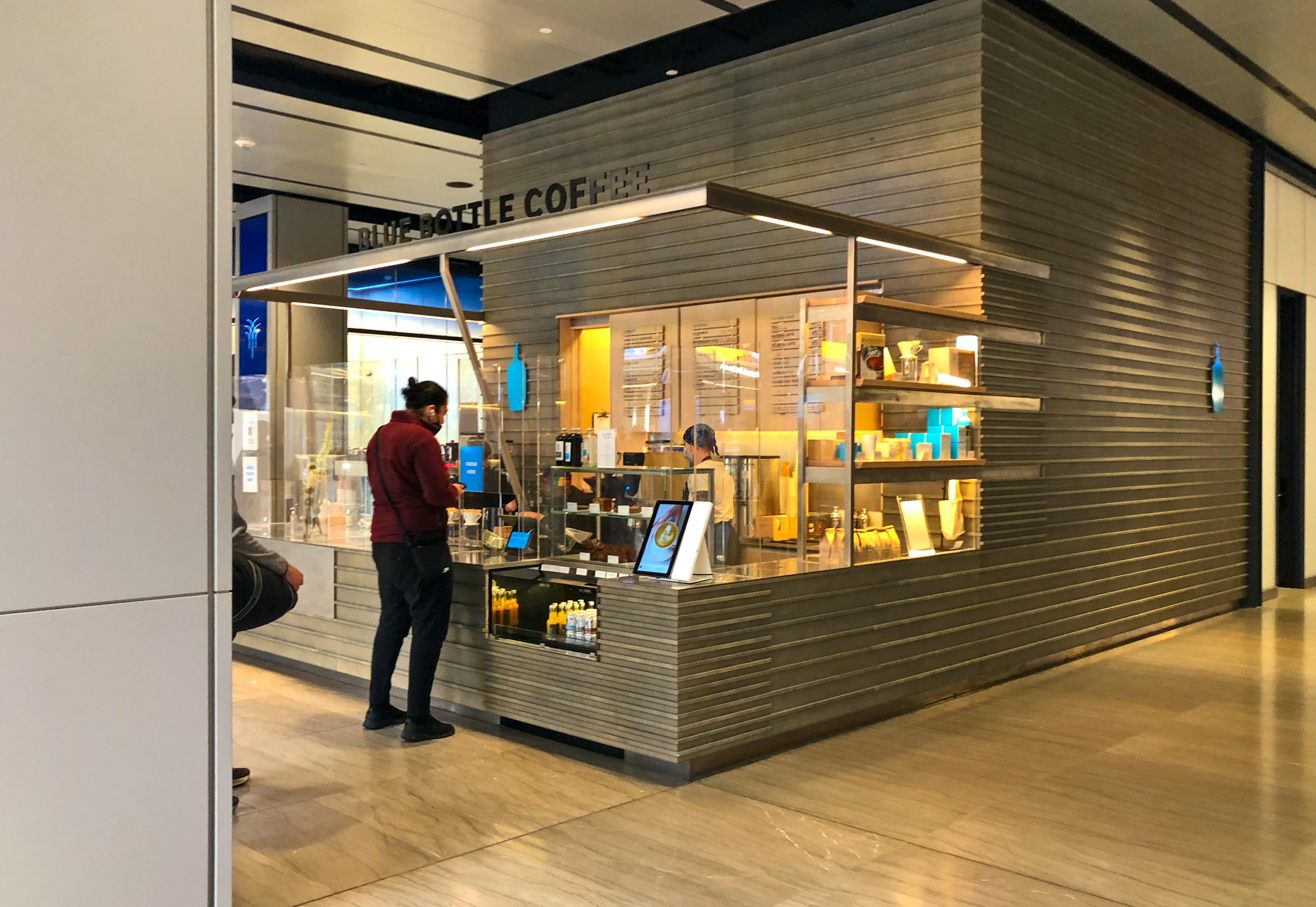
Blue Bottle Coffee stand in the Moynihan Train Hall (Penn Station) New York

In February 2015, Blue Bottle Coffee opened its first location in Tokyo, Japan, in the Kiyosumi neighborhood.

Between its inception and 2017, the company had raised $120 million from investors. In September 2017, Nestle S.A., the world's largest food and drinks company, acquired a majority stake of Blue Bottle. While the deal's financial details were not disclosed, the Financial Times reported "Nestle is understood to be paying up to $500m for the 68 per cent stake in Blue Bottle". Blue Bottle expected to increase sales by 70% in 2017.

In May 2019, Blue Bottle Coffee opened its first location in Seoul, South Korea. In December 2019, Blue Bottle Coffee announced they would test eliminating disposable cups at some of their shops to increase sustainability efforts, with the goal being zero waste within one year. Nothing has been reported to date about this test and whether it was successful. In April 2020, Blue Bottle Coffee opened its first location in Central, Hong Kong. Amid COVID-19, the café opened daily from 8 a.m. to 5 p.m. for takeaway only.

In February 2022, Blue Bottle Coffee opened its first location in mainland China, Yutong Cafe. Yutong Cafe is located at a historic building by Suzhou Creek in downtown Shanghai.

In August 2024, Blue Bottle Coffee opened a gift-centric store in Raffles City Shopping Centre, Singapore. In April 2025, this location was converted to a café and became the company's first location in South East Asia. It has since gone on to open its second store in Singapore at Paragon in July 2025.

In December 2025, it was reported that Nestlé was considering selling Blue Bottle.

In March 2026, Centurium Capital reached an agreement with Nestle to acquire Blue Bottle Coffee. At the time, Blue Bottle Coffee was operating at a loss.

== Labor relations ==
In April 2024, Blue Bottle Coffee’s Boston area locations filed to unionize. Baristas cited multiple grievances with the company as reason for unionizing, including not being paid a living wage, mishandling of sexual harassment, and not being given input into café operations. The union requested voluntary recognition from the company, and subsequently engaged in a state-wide walkout when Blue Bottle Coffee refused to recognize the union.

In September 2024, Blue Bottle Coffee fired union organizer Remy Roskin. In May 2025, Blue Bottle Independent Union (BBIU) conducted another state-wide walkout across Blue Bottle Coffee’s greater Boston area locations in protest of multiple alleged unfair labor practices, including the company attempting to install surveillance cameras. On June 17 2025, four Blue Bottle cafés in California’s East Bay area (Berkeley, Old Oakland, Piedmont, and W.C. Morse) announced their intent to join BBIU. The next day, June 18, Blue Bottle terminated union organizer BB Young, which BBIU alleges was illegal retaliation. On July 31, the four East Bay area locations won recognition through an NLRB election in a 22–5 vote. This vote resulted in nearly 12% of U.S. Blue Bottle locations being unionized. In November 2025, roughly 80 Blue Bottle workers around Boston and 35 workers in California went on strike ahead of the Thanksgiving weekend, with workers accusing the company of negotiating with the union in bad faith.

== See also ==
- List of coffeehouse chains
- List of coffee companies
