= Luckin Coffee =

Chinese coffeehouse chain

Luckin Coffee Inc.
- Logo used since 2017

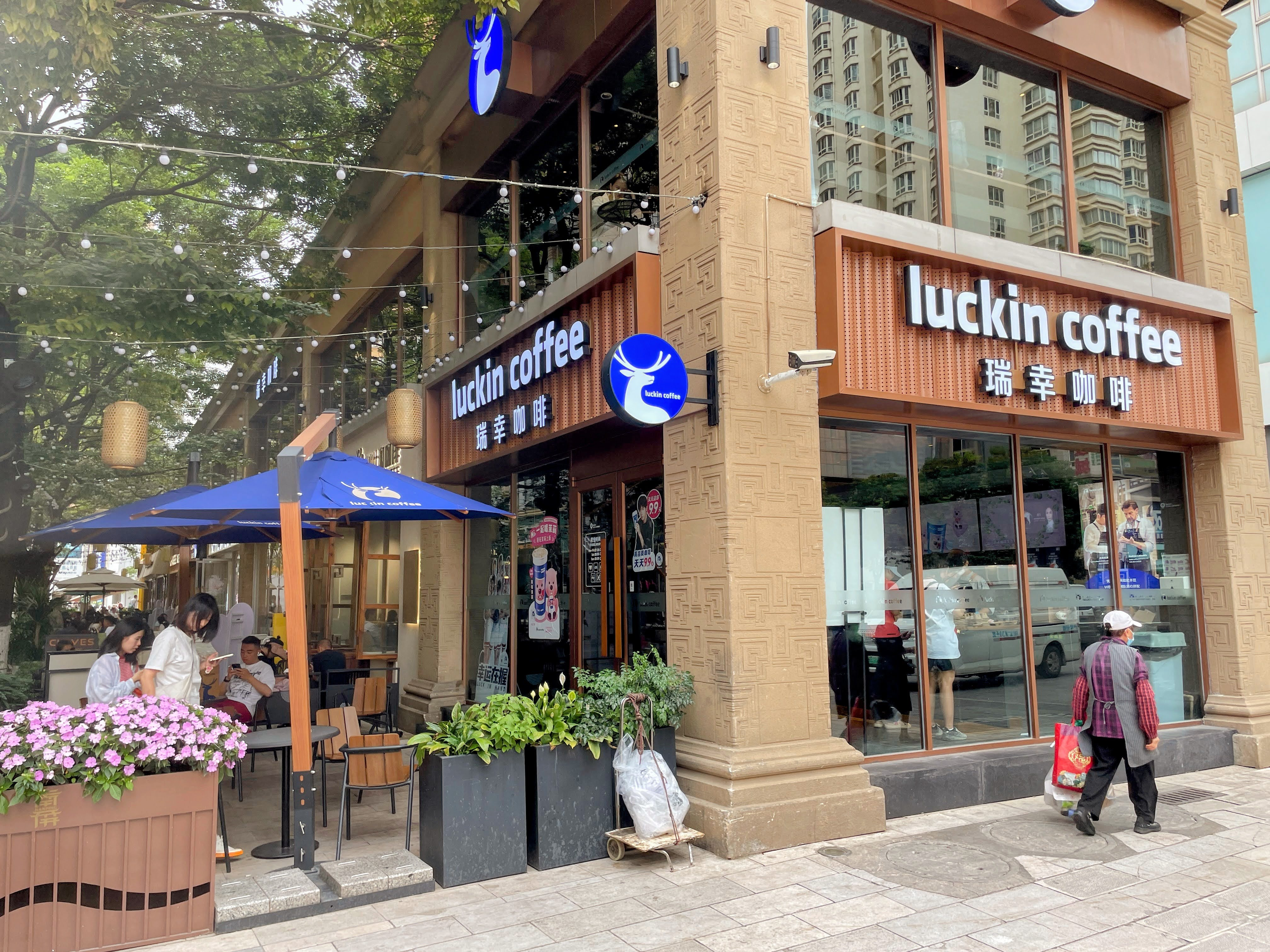
- A Luckin Coffee store in Kunming, China
- Native name: 瑞幸咖啡（中国）有限公司
- Type: Public
- Traded as: OTCID Basic Limited: LKNCY (formerly Nasdaq: LK, but delisted 29 Jun 2020)
- Industry: Coffee shop
- Founded: October 2017; 9 years ago, in Beijing, China
- Founders: Jenny Qian Zhiya; Charles Zhengyao Lu
- Headquarters: Xiamen, Fujian, China
- Number of locations: 35,000 (2026)
- Area served: Mainland China; Hong Kong; Singapore; Malaysia; United States
- Key people: Reinout Schakel (CFO); Jinyi Guo (chairman and CEO)
- Products: Coffee beverages; tea
- Revenue: ▲US$1.22 billion (Q1 2025)
- Operating income: ▲US$101.5 million (Q1 2025)
- Owner: Centurium Capital
- Website: luckincoffee.com

Luckin Coffee Inc. (Chinese: 瑞幸咖啡; pinyin: Ruìxìng Kāfēi) is a Chinese coffee company and coffeehouse chain founded in Beijing in 2017. In the first half of 2026, Luckin had 35,000 stores globally. The company operates shops, stores, and kiosks that offer coffee, tea, and food, generally at lower prices than their competitors. Purchases can only be made using an online app. Luckin is headquartered in Xiamen, Fujian. The company has expanded rapidly since its founding, and by 2019, its stores outnumbered Starbucks locations in China.

In 2020, short-seller Carson Block and his firm Muddy Waters Research published an anonymous 89-page investigative report on Twitter, claiming that the company had falsified financial and operational figures; the company denied the allegations. In April 2020, however, Luckin revealed that it had inflated its 2019 sales revenue by up to US$310 million. This resulted in its stock price crashing and several executives being fired. Trading was suspended, and the company was delisted from NASDAQ on 29 June 2020. Luckin filed for Chapter 15 bankruptcy in the US in February 2021.

In December 2021, the company received court approval from a federal judge in Manhattan to restructure $460M worth of debt and to settle a number of class-action lawsuits against it over the fabricated sales figures. In 2022, The Wall Street Journal reported that the company had emerged from bankruptcy after completing its financial restructuring under United States Code, and that it had replaced most of its top management, who were held accountable for the earlier fraud. Following this restructuring, the company rebuilt its operations through digital kiosks and localized menus, expanding to more than 36,000 stores to become China's largest coffee chain, while establishing an international presence in markets including Singapore, Malaysia, and the United States.

== History ==
=== 2017–2019: Founding ===
Luckin Coffee was incorporated in October 2017; by January 2018, the company had opened its first shops in Beijing and Shanghai, China. The company announced the completion of Series A financing to a total of US$200 million in July 2018 backed by Centurium Capital, Joy Capital, and GIC.

By October 2018, the company had opened 1,300 stores, surpassing the number of Costa Coffee stores to become the second-biggest coffee brand in China. Luckin Coffee also signed a strategic cooperation agreement with Tencent. Much of Luckin's expansion was fueled by an aggressive marketing strategy which saw the company spend three times as much as it earned to feed its growth.

In January 2019, the company announced that it planned to open 2,500 new stores and surpass Starbucks to become the biggest coffee brand in China. Luckin also gained a listing in the US stock market, applying to the Nasdaq and starting to trade at $17 a share. After reaching $25.96 a share on the first day, the stock dropped to $16 a share on its second day of trading.

=== 2020–2021: Accounting scandal ===
In early January 2020, the company raised more capital through a share placement and a convertible bond sale, totalling $821 million as it sought to expand into deploying vending machines that would serve fresh hot beverages and snacks. It also offered a $400 million five-year convertible bond separately.

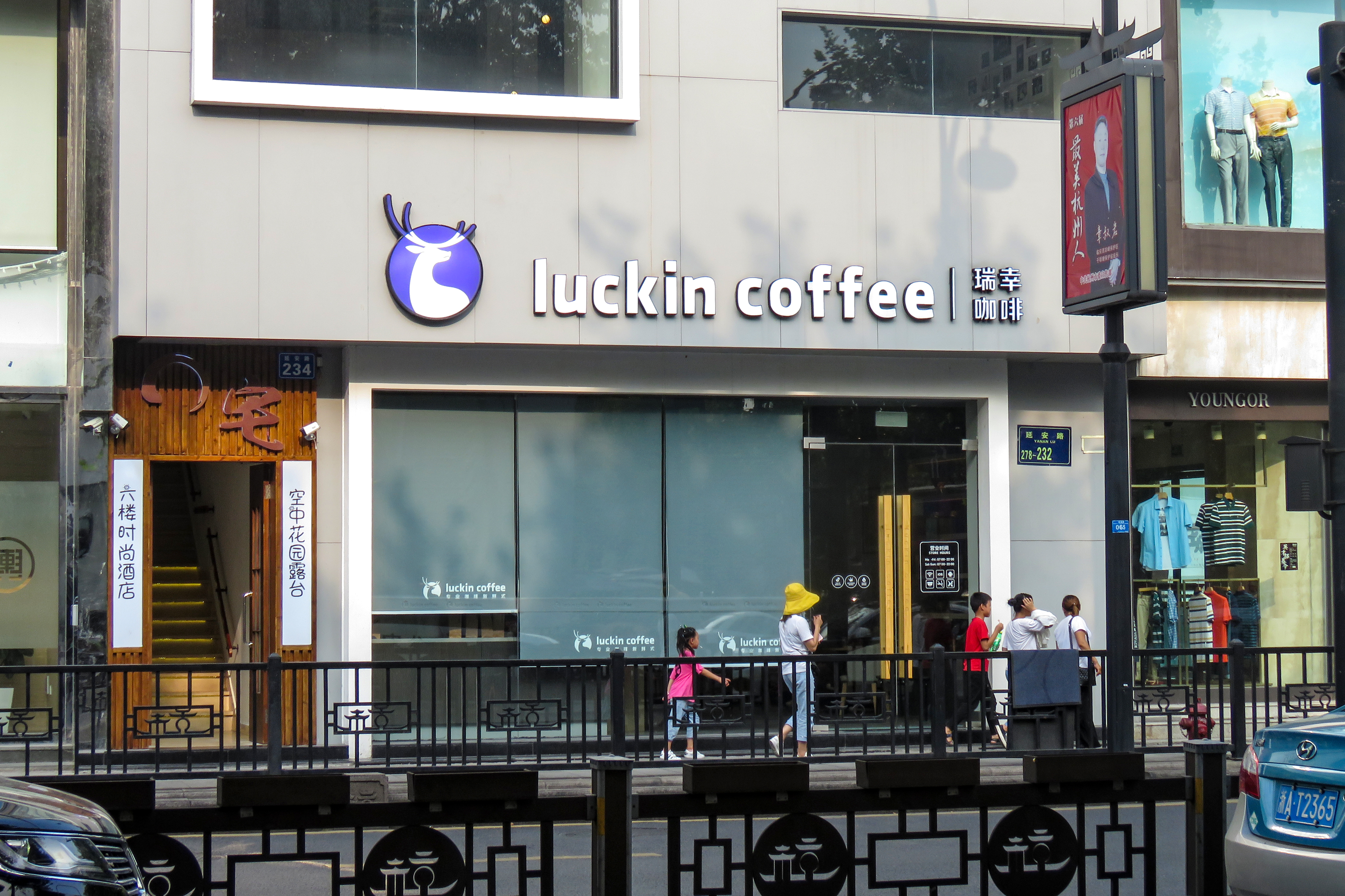
A Luckin Coffee retail store in Hangzhou (2019)

On 31 January 2020, short-seller Carson Block and his firm Muddy Waters Research published an anonymous 89-page investigative report on Twitter, claiming that Luckin Coffee had falsified financial and operational figures. The report claimed that the number of items sold per store was inflated by at least 69% in the third and by 88% in the fourth quarter of 2019, supposedly backed by 11,200 hours of video footage. Before the U.S. stock market opening on 3 February 2020, Luckin Coffee responded by formally denying all allegations made in the report.

On 2 April 2020, however, the company announced that an internal investigation found that its chief operating officer, Jian Liu, had fabricated the company's 2019 sales by "around RMB2.2 billion" (US$310 million). The next day, the China Securities Regulatory Commission said that it would investigate the company for fraud. On 8 April, the U.S. stock market halted trading on all Luckin shares over the fraud probe. In the month of April, the company's stock fell by over 80%. In mid-April 2020, American investment bank Goldman Sachs announced that it would seize and sell the Luckin stock holdings of the company's chairman, Lu Zhengyao, after he defaulted on a $518 million margin loan. The $400 million bond offered just prior to Muddy Waters Research's release of the anonymous report also had imploded by 24 April 2020, with the notes selling as low as for 10 cents on the dollar value of bond.

On 15 May, the company received a delisting notice from NASDAQ. After over a month of being halted for trading, the company's stock was able to be traded again on 20 May 2020. On 28 May, shares of the company plummeted more than 20% after The Wall Street Journal released a report claiming that firms linked to the company's chairman and controlling shareholder played a central role in its accounting scandal. On 29 June 2020, the company suspended trading on NASDAQ and filed for delisting, after the exchange ordered the company to delist. Banks including Credit Suisse had won court orders in the Cayman Islands on 22 June 2020, and in the British Virgin Islands on 9 July 2020, to wind up Lu's controlling entities of Luckin Coffee for liquidation, after Lu's margin loan default. The company thereby entered into a state of provisional liquidation. In September 2020, China's markets regulators fined a group of firms including Luckin Coffee a combined $8.98 million in relation to Luckin's falsification of financial and operational figures. On 16 December 2020, the US SEC settled its accounting fraud case with the company for $180 million. The company agreed to the settlement without admitting or denying the SEC allegations which included defrauding investors by materially misstating revenue and expenses, inflating its growth rates, and understating its losses. On 5 February 2021, the company filed for Chapter 15 bankruptcy in New York, less than a year after the company said that more than a quarter's worth of business may have been faked. By 22 September 2021, the company revealed its plans to restructure. On 30 September 2021, Luckin Coffee settled a US class-action lawsuit to resolve investors' claims for $187.5 million. In December 2021, Luckin received court approval to restructure a large amount of debt and settle a number of lawsuits over fabricated sales figures.

=== 2022–present: Comeback and international expansion ===
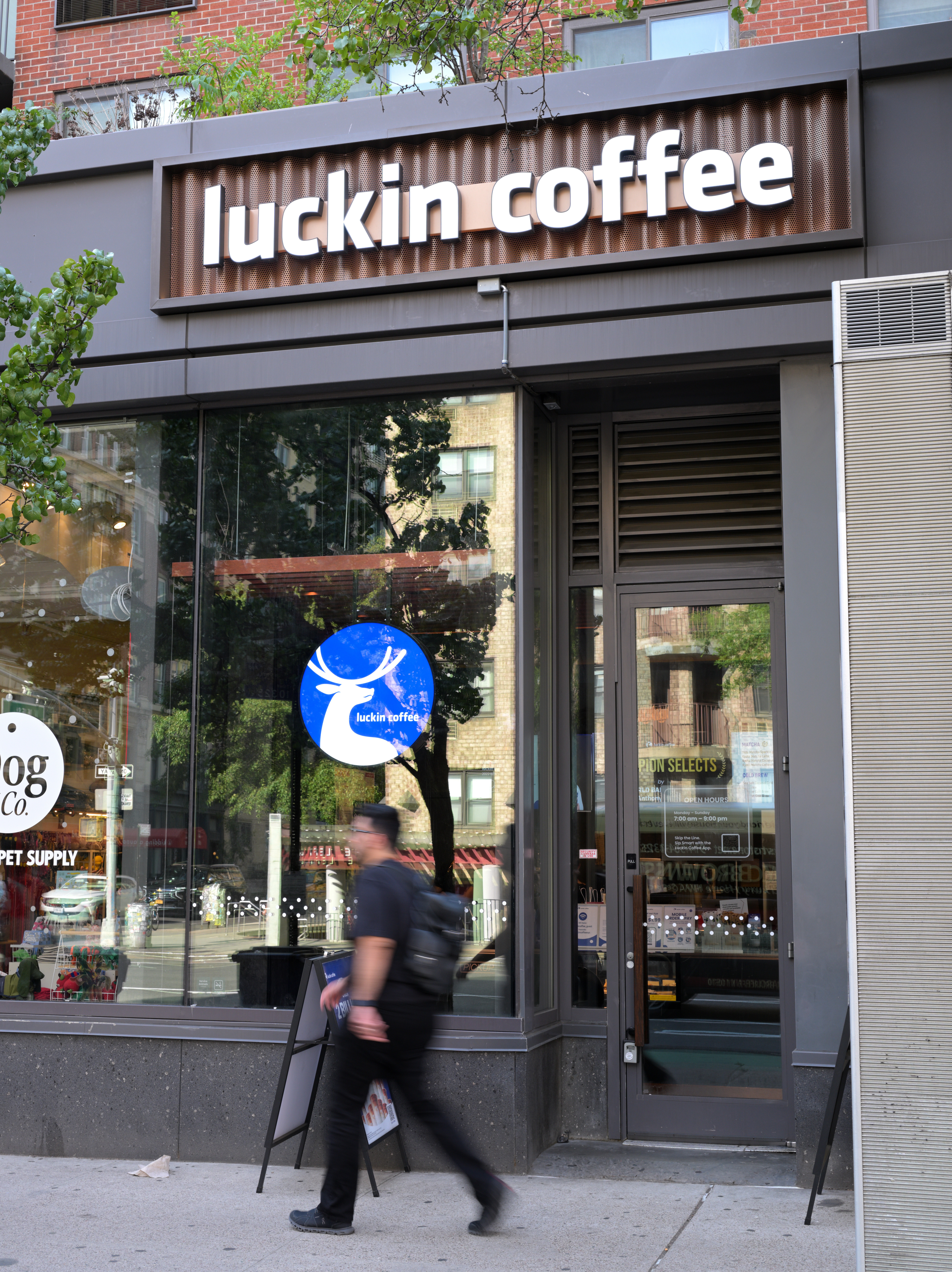
A Luckin Coffee location in New York City

According to The Wall Street Journal, Luckin Coffee emerged from bankruptcy in March 2022 and replaced most of its top management and ousted its former chairman, chief executive, and other employees who carried out the earlier fraud. Additionally, Luckin Coffee is now being run by Chinese private equity firm Centurium Capital, which had earlier made capital injections worth $240 million into the company in the spring of 2021.

The company opened its first overseas locations in Singapore on 31 March 2023, launching two stores, in Marina Square and Ngee Ann City. By September 2026, 100 locations had been opened in the country.

On 29 November 2024, Hextar Industries Berhad announced that it had obtained the exclusive right to bring the coffee brand into Malaysia. The right enables Hextar to develop, open and operate coffee shops nationwide under the Luckin Coffee brand for a period of 10 years, with optional renewal for another 10 years.

In July 2025, the company opened two stores in the East Village and Midtown neighborhoods of New York City, its first locations in the United States. As of May 2026, the company had 14 U.S. locations, all of them in Manhattan.

In February 2026, Luckin announced the opening of its 30,000th store, located in Shenzhen. The store is the first 'Origin Flagship' location and will serve premium menu items. The company said that it had 118 overseas stores as of the third quarter of 2025.

In March 2026, Semafor reported that Luckin had purchased the café business of Nestlé's Blue Bottle Coffee in order to boost its brand portfolio, as well as expand into the premium coffee market.

== See also ==
- Coffee culture
- Coffee wars
- List of coffee companies
- List of coffeehouse chains
