= Sino-Forest Corporation =

Tree plantation operator

Sino-Forest Corporation (Sino-Forest) (TSX: TRE) (Chinese: 嘉汉林业; pinyin: Jiāhàn Línyè) claimed at one time to be one of the leading commercial forest plantation operators in China. In 2011, the company was accused of fraud and found itself under investigation by the Royal Canadian Mounted Police and the Ontario Securities Commission. On March 30, 2012 Sino-Forest filed for bankruptcy protection in Canada. It also announced that the company would be sold or restructured, with the proceeds going to its creditors. On July 13, 2017, the OSC released its decision finding that Sino-Forest and four individuals, including former CEO Allen Chan, committed fraud.

It is not to be confused with China Forestry Holdings Ltd. (HK:0930) or the Chinese state-owned China Forestry Group Corporation (CFGC).

== History ==
The company was formed in 1994 and subsequently claimed that its principal businesses included the ownership and management of tree plantations and complementary manufacturing of downstream engineered-wood products. The company claimed to derive most of its revenue from the sales of wood fibre needed to produce industrial, commercial and residential wood products. Sino-Forest also held a majority interest in Omnicorp Limited, an investment holding company listed in Hong Kong (HK:0094) that in turn claimed to import wood fibre into China. Sino-Forest's common shares traded on the Toronto Stock Exchange under the symbol TRE from 1995 until they were suspended in 2011, and its corporate office were in Mississauga, Canada. Sino-Forest had a market capitalization of just over $5 billion in November 2010.

As of September 30, 2009, Sino-Forest claimed to have had approximately 757,000 hectares of trees under management and over 700,000 hectares of trees available to be acquired under six long-term master agreements. The company claimed to have plans to replant 200,000 hectares by 2012.

Management further claimed that it expected to benefit from China's economic stimulus plan, which included further infrastructure development, rebuilding after Sichuan's 2008 earthquake and building of affordable housing for rural areas.

== Business segments ==
At the end of September 2010, Sino-Forest Corp had claimed approximately 757,000 hectares of forest plantations located in southern China. Its principal business segments include Wood Fibre Operations (i.e. the ownership and management of plantation trees, the sale of standing timber and wood logs, the trading of wood products sourced domestically and internationally) and Manufacturing and Other Operations (i.e. downstream engineered-wood flooring and panels, seedling nurseries, greenery services).

== Subsidiaries ==
Sino-Forest Corporation owned an interest of approximately 60% of Omnicorp Limited (to be renamed Greenheart Group Limited upon shareholder approval), a Hong Kong listed company (HK:0094). In addition, Sino-Forest owned HK$212 million of convertible bonds of Omnicorp, which if fully converted would increase Sino-Forest's interest to nearly 60% of the enlarged issued share capital of Omnicorp.

The principal activities of Omnicorp's subsidiaries claimed to consist of log harvesting, lumber processing and marketing and sales of logs and lumber products to China and other countries around the world. Omnicorp claimed to own 60.4% of the harvesting and other rights in a 184,000-hectare hardwood forest concession in Suriname, South America and Sino-Forest, through its wholly owned subsidiary Sino-Capital Global Inc. owned the remaining 39.6%. Omnicorp also intended to acquire a high quality radiata pine plantation in New Zealand upon satisfaction of certain conditions as announced on November 3, 2010.

== ARCPE ==
Sino-Forest Applied Research Centre for Pearl River Delta Environment (ARCPE) officially opened on 22 June 2009 at the Hong Kong Baptist University. The Centre remains active with Sino-Forest name.

== Reported financial position as of December 31, 2010 ==
The company's claimed assets grew significantly from 2004 to 2010. The reported assets were:

- 2004 $0.7 billion
- 2005 $0.8 billion
- 2006 $1.2 billion
- 2007 $1.8 billion
- 2008 $2.6 billion
- 2009 $3.9 billion
- 2010 $5.7 billion

The December 31, 2010 audited financial statements reported Sino-Forest had:

- $5.7 billion of assets
- $2.4 billion of liabilities
- 395 million of net income

== Fraud allegations ==
On June 2, 2011, shares in Sino-Forest plummeted following the release of a negative research report by Carson Block of Muddy Waters Research, which made allegations that Sino-Forest had been fraudulently inflating its assets and earnings, and that the company's shares were essentially worthless. Muddy Waters claimed that Sino-Forest was a "multibillion-dollar Ponzi scheme" that was "accompanied by substantial theft". Sino-Forest rejected the allegations of fraud and launched an independent investigation by PricewaterhouseCoopers. Shares in Sino-Forest fell by 82% following publication of the Muddy Waters report, with prominent investor John Paulson selling his entire stake in the company at a $720 million loss.

On June 30, debt rating agency Standard & Poors downgraded Sino-Forest's long-term corporate credit rating from "BB" to "B+". A second downgrade to "B" followed on August 23.

On August 15, 2011, Sino-Forest announced that the results of the PwC probe into the allegations would be delayed to the end of the year due to difficulties in gathering data from the Chinese companies involved.

=== Suspension of trading of shares ===
On August 26, 2011, the Ontario Securities Commission suspended trading of the shares of Sino-Forest, stating that the company had engaged in practices they "knew or should have known" perpetuated a fraud. The OSC also initially ordered that five directors of Sino-Forest resign, but rescinded this demand a few hours later as the Ontario Securities Act does not allow the commission to summarily force the resignation of a company director without a hearing.

=== Bankruptcy protection ===
On March 30, 2012, Sino-Forest filed for bankruptcy protection in Canada under the framework laid out in the Companies' Creditors Arrangement Act.

On April 4, 2012, Sino-Forest's auditors, Ernst and Young, resigned.

=== Defamation lawsuit ===
On March 29, 2012, one day before filing for bankruptcy protection, Sino-Forest sued Muddy Waters in the Ontario Superior Court of Justice for defamation. Sino-Forest sought damages of $4 billion. In response to the lawsuit, Muddy Waters stated that Sino's bankruptcy protection filing vindicated its accusations since the company would not require bankruptcy protection if it was really generating close to $2 billion in cash flow.

=== Settlement of investors' lawsuits ===
In 2015, the firm's auditors Ernst and Young, a group of financial institutions (Credit Suisse Securities (Canada) Inc., TD Securities Inc., Dundee Securities Corp., Merrill Lynch Canada Inc., RBC Dominion Securities Inc., Scotia Capital Inc., CIBC World Markets Inc., Canaccord Financial Ltd. and Maison Placements Canada Inc.), and former Sino-Forest chief executive David Horsley paid $117 million, $32.5 million and $5.6 million respectively to settle investor's lawsuits.

=== Ontario Securities Commission decision ===
On July 13, 2017, the OSC released its decision finding that "Sino-Forest, Chan, Ip, Hung and Ho engaged in deceitful or dishonest conduct related to Sino-Forest's standing timber assets and revenue they knew constituted fraud." The OSC also found that the individual respondents violated Ontario securities law by misleading commission staff during the investigation.

== Bankruptcy protection proceedings ==
A Plan of Compromise and Reorganization was approved by the court on 10 December 2012, which is expected to come into effect on 17 January 2013. It is now controlled by its bondholders and operating as Emerald Plantation Holdings based in Hong Kong.

== See also ==
- China Medical Technologies
- Strategic lawsuit against public participation

The Internet Archive Wayback Machine captured the corporation's websites of www.sinoforest.com and www.sinoforestonline.com multiple times during its period of operation.
