= China Biologic Products =

Chinese pharmaceutical company

China Biologic Products, Inc.
- Type: Private
- Traded as: Nasdaq: CBPO
- Industry: Biotechnology
- Headquarters: Beijing, China
- Website: www.chinabiologic.com

China Biologic Products, Inc., through its indirect majority-owned subsidiary Shandong Taibang, is the only blood plasma-based biopharmaceutical company approved by the government of Shandong Province.

== Background ==
The company is engaged in the research, manufacturing, and sale of plasma-based biopharmaceutical products to hospitals and other healthcare facilities in China. Plasma-based human albumin is used mainly to increase blood volume while Immunoglobulin is used for disease prevention and treatment.

Previously listed on Nasdaq, in April 2021, it was taken private in a $4.6 billion deal by an investor group that included Centurium Capital, CITIC Capital and Hillhouse Capital.
