= China Forestry Group Corporation =

China Forestry Group Co., Ltd.
- Type: Private Company
- Industry: Manufacturing General, Forestry
- Founded: 1984; 42 years ago
- Headquarters: Beijing, China
- Area served: Worldwide
- Products: Wood products production; Tree cultivation; Seedling supply; Husbandry; Forest products processing; Forest products trading; Forest Resource Operation; Fishery services
- Owner: Zhonglin Group
- Number of employees: 2,102
- Parent: Ministry of Forestry
- Website: https://en.cfgc.cn/g1126.aspx

China Forestry Group Corporation (Chinese: 中国林业集团有限公司) is a Chinese forestry company, that was established directly under the State Forestry Administration of the People's Republic of China in February 1984 to plant and manage forests in China and internationally, as well as to produce, process, import and export forest products China Forestry Group Corporation has its headquarters in Beijing and runs business operations in the United States, Canada, New Zealand, Australia, Myanmar, India, Singapore, Russia, France, Uruguay, Brazil, South Africa, and Mozambique.

A company with a similar name, China Forestry, was formerly listed on the Hong Kong Stock Exchange, but ceased operations after financial fraud was discovered.

== New Zealand operation ==
As a wholly owned subsidiary of China Forestry Group Corporation, China Forestry Group New Zealand Company Ltd is a New Zealand-registered and -based forest products and management company. The company acquires and manages forest resources, harvesting, wood products transportation, sales and export. Its wood products supply both the New Zealand and international markets. China Forestry Group Corporation is keen in further direct investment in forests in New Zealand.
