= Roth Capital Partners =

American small privately held investment banking company

ROTH
- Company type: Private
- Industry: Finance and insurance
- Founded: 1984; 42 years ago
- Headquarters: Newport Beach, California, U.S.
- Key people: Sagar Sheth (CEO); Aaron Gurewitz (President); Gordon Roth (CFO)
- Products: Investment banking Financial services
- Revenue: ▲US $ 55 million (2007)
- Number of employees: 235 (2023)
- Website: http://www.roth.com

Roth Capital Partners, LLC, is a privately held investment banking company with headquarters in Newport Beach, California and a global trading floor in Stamford, Connecticut. It specializes in providing services to growth companies and their investors, including capital raising, equity research, macroeconomics, sales and trading, technical insights, derivatives strategies, M&A advisory, and corporate access.

== Company history ==
Logo as Roth Capital Partners

In 1977 Walter Cruttenden III founded Capital Data Bank, a system that matched private companies with private investors by computer. Under Cruttenden's chairmanship that company grew into Cruttenden & Co. and began offering brokerage services in 1984. Byron Roth joined in 1992 and bought a 15 percent share of the company. He became president in 1994 and the company was renamed Cruttenden Roth.

Byron Roth became CEO in 1997 and retained that post when he became chairman on Cruttenden's resignation in November 1998.The Orange County Business Journal reported in April 2018 the colleagues remain friends, with Roth investing in several Cruttenden-founded companies and Cruttenden speaking at Roth’s business conferences. “Byron’s done such a terrific job growing Roth, just fulfilling every dream I had and then some,” Cruttenden said in an interview. In February 2000 the firm changed its name to Roth Capital Partners, Inc.

During the summer of 2020, Roth Canada, an affiliate of Roth Capital Partners focused on serving emerging growth Canadian companies and their investors, became an IIROC-regulated Dealer Member. Roth Canada is headquartered in Toronto and maintains an office in Vancouver.

In February 2023, Roth acquired Stamford, Connecticut-based MKM Partners, LLC. Through the acquisition, Roth added offerings in trading, research, sales, derivatives, event driven/risk arbitrage, proprietary studies, and high yield/credit.

== Conferences and charity events ==
Roth Capital has organized annual conferences since 1988. Held in Orange County, California, their purpose is to facilitate small public companies make pitches to institutional investors. The conferences have featured exotic sets, scantily clad dancers, and performers such as Snoop Dogg and The Pussycat Dolls.

The 2024 annual conference included executives from approximately 500 public and private companies across various sectors, including Consumer, Technology and Media, Sustainability and Industrial Growth, Agtech, Energy, Metals and Mining, Healthcare, Services, and Insurance. In addition to the annual conference in Orange County, California, Roth’s other conferences include an Annual London Conference, Healthcare Opportunities Conference, New York Technology Conference, and its Deer Valley Event.

Roth’s conferences also include charitable activities, including athletics events to support the Challenged Athletes Foundation, an organization which helps those with physical challenges gain and maintain access to sports. For over a decade, the Challenged Athletes Foundation has been the official charity of the annual conference, and as of March 2024, Roth’s conferences have raised $1.7 million for the organization.

RX3 also holds a signature charitable event annually: “a popular flag football tournament that attracts NFL quarterbacks like Joe Flacco, Bryce Young, and Orange County resident and RX3 investor Jared Goff, as well as Rodgers,” the Orange County Business Journal reported. The third annual tournament, held in March 2024, raised almost $3 million for charity.

== Locations ==
ROTH’s headquarters is located in the Newport Center business district in Newport Beach, California. The firm’s global trading floor is located in Downtown Stamford, Connecticut. The firm also has offices in metropolitan cities including New York, Chicago, Los Angeles, San Francisco, Austin, Boston, and Miami Beach.

== Investment history ==
In 2004, Roth and John Potter established Cortina Asset Management, a Milwaukee-based small-cap growth equity manager. Pensions & Investments reported in April 2019 that Silvercrest Asset Management Group agreed to acquire Cortina, which had $1.7 billion in assets under management at the time.

In 2018, Roth, Nate Raabe, and quarterback Aaron Rodgers founded RX3 Ventures, a private equity fund focused on established consumer brands. Forbes noted that RX3 is “backed by a deep roster of influencer investors, with many from the world of sports, including former Heisman Trophy winner Desmond Howard, auto racing trailblazer Danica Patrick, and skateboarder Ryan Sheckler,” along with “a half-dozen NFL quarterbacks.” In April 2024, the Orange County Business Journal reported that RX3 had raised over $200 million.

== See also ==
- List of investment banks
- Microcap stock
