= Lu Zhengyao =

Chinese businessman

- Born: 1969 or 1970 (age 56–57)
- Education: Peking University (EMBA); University of Science and Technology Beijing (BSc.)
- Occupations: Businessman, investor
- Title: Chairman of Luckin Coffee

Lu Zhengyao (陸正耀) aka Charles Lu (born 1969/1970) is a Chinese businessman and investor. He is the non-executive chairman of Luckin Coffee, a coffee shop chain in China. Lu earned a degree in industrial electric automation from the University of Science and Technology Beijing in 1991, and an EMBA degree from Peking University in 2010.

Lu was an early investor in Luckin Coffee. In mid-April 2020, American investment bank Goldman Sachs announced that it would seize and sell Zhengyao's Luckin stock holdings after he defaulted on a corporate margin loan. In December 2020, he paid a 180-million-dollar fine to the US Securities and Exchange Commission for defrauding investors.

Lu also owns about 33 percent of Car Inc., a Hong Kong-listed car rental company. In May 2021, he announced he was working on the launch of a 500-store noodle stores chain, Xiaomian Riji ('noodle diary').
