= Centurium Capital =

Chinese private equity firm

Centurium Capital Management Ltd.
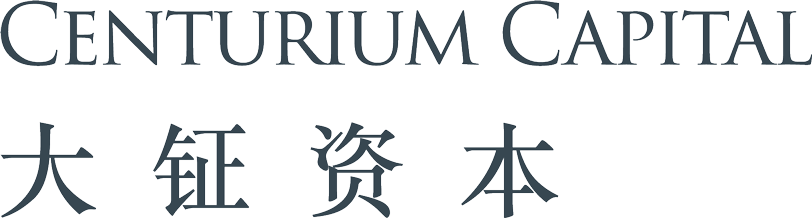
- Native name: 大钲资本
- Type: Private
- Industry: Private equity
- Founded: September 2017; 9 years ago
- Founders: David Li
- Headquarters: Beijing, China
- Key people: David Li (chairman & CEO)
- AUM: US$7.0 billion (December 2023)
- Number of employees: ~60 (December 2022)
- Website: centurium.com

Centurium Capital Management Ltd. (Centurium; Chinese: 大钲资本; pinyin: Dàzhēng Zīběn) is a Chinese private equity firm headquartered in Beijing, China. It is currently the controlling shareholder of Luckin Coffee.

Centurium has additional offices in Hong Kong and Shanghai.

== Background ==
In 2017, Centurium was co-founded by David Li and two other partners in Beijing. Li was previously the Head of Asia Pacific at Warburg Pincus.

The firm focuses on acquiring control of companies consumer, healthcare, business services and technology sectors in China. It looks to improve operational efficiencies of the companies and resolving deficiencies within them.

In March 2018, Centurium's debut USD-denominated fund, Centurium Capital Partners 2018 L.P. raised $2 billion. Its secured interest from foreign investors such as GIC, Temasek Holdings and Ontario Teachers' Pension Plan.

Centurium planned on raising a second USD-denominated fund, with a target size of $2.5 billion and was close to reaching $2 billion in March 2020. However, in April 2020. it had put the fundraising on hold after its portfolio company, Luckin Coffee was involved in an accounting scandal. In April 2022, according to an SEC filing Centurium had raised $249 million from investors. In August 2023, Centurium reduced the target size of the fund to $1.5 billion.

== Notable investments ==
=== Luckin Coffee ===
Centurium's most notable investment is Luckin Coffee where it was one of its earliest backers. It invested $180 million in Luckin Coffee's Series A and B rounds. In May 2019, Luckin Coffee held its initial public offering on the Nasdaq raising $645 million. In January 2020, Centrium sold $232 million worth of Luckin Coffee shares via share placement. However shortly afterwards, Luckin Coffee was involved in an accounting scandal that fabricated more than $300 million of sales and was subsequently delisted and was required to pay $180 million in penalties to the SEC. In addition the management team including its CEO was replaced.

Luckin Coffee came up with a shareholders rights plan that would make it easier for Centrium to become a controlling shareholder. However it was opposed by other shareholders and claimed Centurium entered into an undisclosed share purchase agreement with Luckin Coffee that was not disclosed to the others. In January 2022, Centrium became the controlling shareholder of Luckin Coffee with over 50% of voting rights after acquiring the shares previously held by its co-founders via a consortium with IDG Capital and Ares Management. Centrium was involved in the restructuring of Luckin Coffee and injected cash into it so it could pay for shareholder litigation, bond payments and overseas restructuring costs. Centurium's restructuring strategy was to close down underperforming stores and increase the price of a cup of coffee by 60 per cent. In addition, Luckin Coffee would use an "in-app" purchase system to reduce property and staffing costs as well as using franchisees to expand the number of stores rather than directly owning them. In a span of 18 months, Luckin Coffee experienced significant operational improvement had emerged from bankruptcy in March 2022.

In May 2024, it was reported that Centurium was considering bringing in fresh backers for Luckin Coffee. It was gauging interest in a continuation fund.

In March 2026, Centurium Capital reached an agreement to acquire Blue Bottle Coffee from Nestle for less than $400 million. At the time, Blue Bottle Coffee was operating at a loss.

=== Others ===
In April 2021, an investor group that included Centurium, CITIC Capital and Hillhouse Capital took China Biologic Products private from the Nasdaq in a $4.6 billion deal.
