= Muddy Waters Research =

American stock market research company and investment firm

Muddy Waters Research LLC
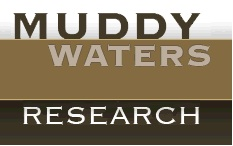
- Trade name: Muddy Waters Capital LLC
- Type: Private
- Industry: Investment management
- Founder: Carson Block
- Headquarters: Austin, Texas, United States
- Key people: Carson Block (CEO & CIO); Scott Dennis Devinsky (CFO, CCO, COO)
- AUM: $227 Million
- Number of employees: 7+
- Website: muddywatersresearch.com

Muddy Waters Research LLC is an American investment research firm known for activist short selling. It was founded in 2010 by investor Carson Block. The firm publishes due‑diligence reports on publicly traded companies and, through its affiliated investment adviser Muddy Waters Capital LLC, often takes positions consistent with its research.

It has exposed accounting problems and fraud at several companies, primarily in China but also in other countries in Asia, Europe and North America.

== History ==
Muddy Waters Research was founded in 2010 by Carson Block. In January 2016, Block launched Muddy Waters Capital LLC, an SEC‑registered investment adviser, to manage capital alongside the firm’s research activities.

The company is named after the Chinese proverb "muddy waters makes it easy to catch fish" (渾水摸魚). In January 2015, the firm raised an initial $100 million for its investment strategy.

As of 2025, SEC filings list the firm’s principal office in Austin, Texas.

== Notable campaigns ==
=== Sino-Forest (2011-2012) ===
Muddy Waters gained notability in 2011 following the release of a negative research report on Sino-Forest Corp, in which Muddy Waters alleged that the company was fraudulently inflating its assets and earnings hence, making the company's shares worthless. Muddy Waters declared that the Sino-Forest was a "multi-billion dollar ponzi scheme". As a result, shares of Sino-Forest fell by 82% following Muddy Waters report, forcing prominent investor John Paulson to sell his entire stake at a $US720 million loss. Sino-Forest dismissed Muddy Waters allegations of fraud and launched an independent investigation for PricewaterhouseCoopers to oversee. On March 30, 2012, Sino-Forest filed for bankruptcy protection in Canada under the Companies' Creditors Arrangement Act.

=== Link Motion Inc (NQ Mobile) ===
In 24 October 2013, Muddy Waters released a report on NQ Mobile, a Chinese-based cybersecurity and mobile application company. Muddy Waters's research report claimed NQ Mobile had "fictitious" customers and revenues. In April 2015, the co-CEO of NQ Mobile, Omar Khan, stepped down after the stock had fallen nearly 84 percent.

=== Other ===
Block has also released reports on companies including American Tower Corp., Noble Group, Focus Media, Olam International, Groupo Casino, Orient Paper, China Media Express, Bank of the Ozarks, Rino International, Bolloré, and TeliaSonera.

In April 2016 Muddy Waters turned against German MDAX listed company Ströer SE & Co. KGaA. Among other things Muddy Waters accused Germany's biggest advertising company of violation of IFRS accounting directives and claiming that digital organic growth rates presented by the company were faulty, resulting in a loss of its stocks by 25%, with prices falling from €52 to just under €35 within 45 minutes of a TV presentation by Muddy Waters on the company. Shortly after German Federal Financial Supervisory Authority inquired the case suspecting overstepping of ethical and legal lines by Muddy Waters Capital. One aspect dealt with Muddy Waters failing to report the build up of a short-position exceeding 0,5% of stocks in due time. According to German financial law this notice has to be given at least one day after creating a short-position within that limit. According to public prosecution office Muddy Waters has overstepped that time period by five days. Since June 2017 public prosecution department of Frankfurt am Main investigates the case with respect to alleged market manipulation by Muddy Waters in the case of Ströer.

In August 2016, Muddy Waters released a report claiming that pacemakers and other implantable medical devices made by St. Jude Medical were highly vulnerable to hacking. St. Jude Medical denied the claims made by Muddy Waters, stating that they were "false and misleading" and sued the firm for defamation. In January 2017, the U.S. Food & Drug Administration and the Department of Homeland Security released the results of an investigation into St. Jude's cybersecurity vulnerabilities, which confirmed the findings of Muddy Waters.

On his process for finding wrongdoing at companies, Block has been quoted saying "It's a bit like solving a puzzle. You're really trying to find the pieces and how they match together to make a clear picture of just what the company is doing."

Block appears frequently as a commentator on Bloomberg Television, CNBC and the BBC. He has written op-eds in the Wall Street Journal, Financial Times, and The New York Times on various topics related to improving corporate governance and market transparency.

On June 29, 2017, Muddy Waters opened research into Prothena Corp PLC, a biotech company whose leading product the shortseller claimed was commercially unviable.

In August 2019, Muddy Waters announced that it was short Burford Capital, citing issues, as Muddy Waters saw it, with Burford's fair value accounting practices. In December 2019, Muddy Waters announced it was short NMC Health.

In January 2020, Muddy Waters warned that Luckin Coffee, what they termed a "fundamentally broken business", fabricated its sales and expenses whilst management cashed out on the stock; on April 2, the company admitted that its COO and subordinates significantly fabricated corporate metrics, sending the stock down over 70%.

In May 2020, Muddy Waters announced that it is short GSX Techedu Inc. (GSX US).

In November 2020, Muddy Waters announced that it is short JOYY Inc (NASDAQ: YY).

In March 2021, Muddy Waters announced that it is short XL Fleet Corp (NYSE: XL US).

In July 12, 2022, Muddy Waters announced that it is short Hannon Armstrong Sustainable Infrastructure Capital (NYSE:HASI US), citing issues with Hannon Armstrong's accounting which it considered both "complex and misleading" making their "financial statements effectively meaningless".

In November 2022, Muddy Waters announced it was short on DLocal Ltf (DLO US).

In June 2024, it announced a short on Eurofins Scientific.

== See also ==
- Hindenburg Research
- Citron Research
- James Chanos
- Short selling
- Sino-Forest
- Olam International
- The Big Short
