= Carson Block =

American businessman

- Born: April 27, 1977 (age 49); New York City, New York, U.S.
- Education: University of Southern California; Chicago-Kent College of Law
- Occupation: Investor
- Known for: founder of Muddy Waters Research
- Title: Founder, CEO, & CIO of Muddy Waters Capital LLC
- Website: muddywaterscapital.com

Carson Cutler Block (born April 27, 1977) is an American investor and activist short-seller, best known as the founder of Muddy Waters Research and Muddy Waters Capital, an investment research firm and hedge fund. His work has included high-profile campaigns on publicly traded companies in North America, Europe, and Asia.

Block first gained wide attention in 2011 for reporting on irregularities at Sino‑Forest, a Toronto‑listed Chinese forestry company that later entered Canadian bankruptcy protection. He was named to Bloomberg Markets' "50 Most Influential" list in 2011. He has also appeared in the 2017 documentary The China Hustle and co‑authored Doing Business in China For Dummies (2007).

== Early life and education ==
Block was born in New York City and grew up in Summit, New Jersey. His father Bill Block was an equity analyst and ran W.A.B. Capital, an equity research firm that focuses on small cap companies, and his mother Grace Smith works as a MetLife database administrator. His parents divorced when he was six years old. Block has been an atheist since he was in second grade.

He earned an undergraduate B.S in Business Administration from the University of Southern California ('98). There, Block studied Chinese and Business (focusing on Finance). He moved to China after college, in 1998.

Block later returned to the United States, and worked in investment banking for nine months in 1999 for the Los Angeles office of CIBC World Markets. He then went to work with his father during 1999 to 2002, a period he describes as “very embittering” as he was “lied to by a parade of management” of internet companies. He quit equity analysis for law school.

He then attended Chicago-Kent College of Law, from which he holds a J.D. degree ('05). He served as an adjunct professor at the law school in 2008.

== Career ==
After graduating from law school, Block moved back to Shanghai, China, and worked in mergers and acquisitions and foreign direct investment for law firm Jones Day from 2005 until 2006. He lived in Shanghai until 2010. He left Jones Day and the practice of law to co-author a book with Robert Collins entitled Doing Business in China for Dummies. He also established a self-storage business in China in 2007.

He founded Muddy Waters Research, an investor research firm and hedge fund, and became known for alleging and documenting fraudulent accounting practices in publicly traded Chinese companies that were trading in North America, and as a short-seller.

He targeted Chinese forest plantation operator company Sino-Forest in 2011, accusing it of overstating its timber holdings. The company ultimately filed for bankruptcy.

In 2011, Block was ranked as a 50 Most Influential Thinker by Bloomberg Markets.

Block was featured in the 2015 book by Richard Teitelbaum entitled The Most Dangerous Trade: How Short Sellers Uncover Fraud, Keep Markets Honest, and Make and Lose Billions. In September 2017, he initiated a private lawsuit against Equifax, accusing it of neglecting to safeguard his personally identifiable information. He appears in the 2017 financial documentary The China Hustle, outlining his research into securities fraud of Chinese companies through Muddy Waters. In early 2018, he settled a case with St. Jude Medical Inc.

As of April 2021, eight of the companies that Block had exposed as being fraudulent had been delisted from stock exchanges, and two other such companies had settled charges with their regulators. Over the prior five years, Muddy Waters had annualized returns of 19% (after a management fee (2.5%) and a performance fee (30%)).

In 2022, Block wrote a white paper entitled "Distorting the Shorts," in which he said that Columbia associate professor Joshua Mitts, who had authored research about short sellers which argued that some short activism was market manipulation, had written research that was “greatly flawed, possibly to the point of being fraudulent”. He called the work by Mitts "a non-empirical, conflict-laden polemic based on misrepresentation, selective presentation of data, and lack of academic integrity. He submitted the paper to the Securities and Exchange Commission, among others.

In 2024, U.S. authorities closed both civil and criminal probes into Block’s activities without action.
