= Evolution Fresh =

American food and drink company

- Industry: Beverages
- Founded: Monrovia, California, United States (1992)
- Founder: Jimmy Rosenberg
- Key people: Kevin Johnson (CEO); Jimmy Rosenberg (Chief Juice Officer)
- Products: Drinks
- Owner: Bolthouse Farms
- Website: EvolutionFresh.com

Evolution Fresh, a former subsidiary of Starbucks Corporation, acquired by Bolthouse Farms in August 2022, is an American-based company producing fruit juices, fruit smoothies, gourmet soups, salads and signature bowls.

== History ==
Jimmy Rosenberg founded the Evolution Fresh Company in San Bernardino, California in 1992. Jimmy was the founder of the Naked Juice Company in 1983 that was later sold to PepsiCo under the parent company's PepsiCo Americas Beverages division in 2006.

On November 10, 2011, Evolution Fresh was acquired by Starbucks Corporation.

In August 2012, Ledcor Group of Companies collaborated with Starbucks Corporation and the Evolution Fresh operational group to develop a complex juice production and bottling operation and facility in Rancho Cucamonga, California. They remodeled the existing 250,000 sq. ft. dry warehouse building to accommodate the juice process and production facility. The building required extensive renovations and upgrades.

After its completion in February 2014, the juice production facility currently distributes a variety of bottled fresh juice products to Starbucks stores nationally, designed to generate approximately 9 million gallons of bottled fruit and vegetable juice per year, with expansion capacity to 12 million gallons.

== Products ==
Evolution Fresh produces a line of super-premium, cold-pressed juices and in 2010 Evolution invested in a new form of pasteurization equipment, known as Pascalization or High pressure processing (HPP). Using HPP, the bottled juice is subject to thousands of pounds of pressure for preservation without exposing the product to heat that some believe could damage the juice's flavor, color and nutritional value.

In 2011, Evolution produces five types of juice with the pascalization or High Pressure Process, Orange, Grapefruit, Lemonade, Apple and Tangerine. This process now allows for a 40-day shelf life for fresh juice. Evolution products currently go from the tree to shelf in less than 7 days.
