= Torrefazione Italia =

Brand of coffee

- Product type: Coffee
- Current owner: Starbucks
- Introduced: 1986; Seattle, Washington, U.S.
- Markets: Worldwide

Torrefazione Italia is a discontinued high-end brand of Starbucks coffee beans that was sold in grocery stores. It started out as its own coffeehouse chain before being acquired by Starbucks in 2003.

== History ==
The first Torrefazione Italia café opened in Seattle, Washington in 1986. Espresso, coffee and baked goods were served in their cafés.

Umberto Bizzarri, Torrefazione's founder, teamed up with Stewart Brother's Coffee (later renamed Seattle's Best Coffee) founder, Jim Stewart, in the mid-1980s to create Seattle Coffee Holdings. This new company built a more modern roasterie on Vashon Island, Washington in 1995 and manufactured Seattle's Best Coffee and Torrefazione Italia Coffee. Seattle Coffee Holdings was purchased in 1998 by AFC Enterprises and renamed Seattle Coffee Company.

Torrefazione Italia expanded to other cities in North America, notably, Vancouver BC, the San Francisco Bay Area, Portland, Boston, Chicago, and Dallas. Their coffees are also wholesaled to restaurants, hotels, bakeries and cafés.

Starbucks, another Seattle-based coffee company, purchased Torrefazione Italia along with Seattle's Best Coffee in 2003. Starbucks announced in 2005 that all 17 Torrefazione Italia cafés would be closed before the end of the year, and all of the San Francisco retail locations were closed on 27 October 2005. The coffee brand has been retained, however, and the coffee was available throughout the United States in coffee shops, hotels, resorts, offices, schools, hospitals, and elsewhere.

== Products ==
=== Whole Bean ===
- Perugia
- Montecatini Decaf
- Roma
- Palermo
- Venezia
- Napoli

=== Ground Portion Pack ===
- Napoli
- Montecatini Decaf

== Caffè Umbria ==
The Bizzarri family has since started another roaster and coffee chain, Caffè Umbria, which was established by third-generation roaster Emanuele Bizzarri, the son of Umberto.

== See also ==
- List of coffeehouse chains
