= Howard Schultz =

American businessman (born 1953)

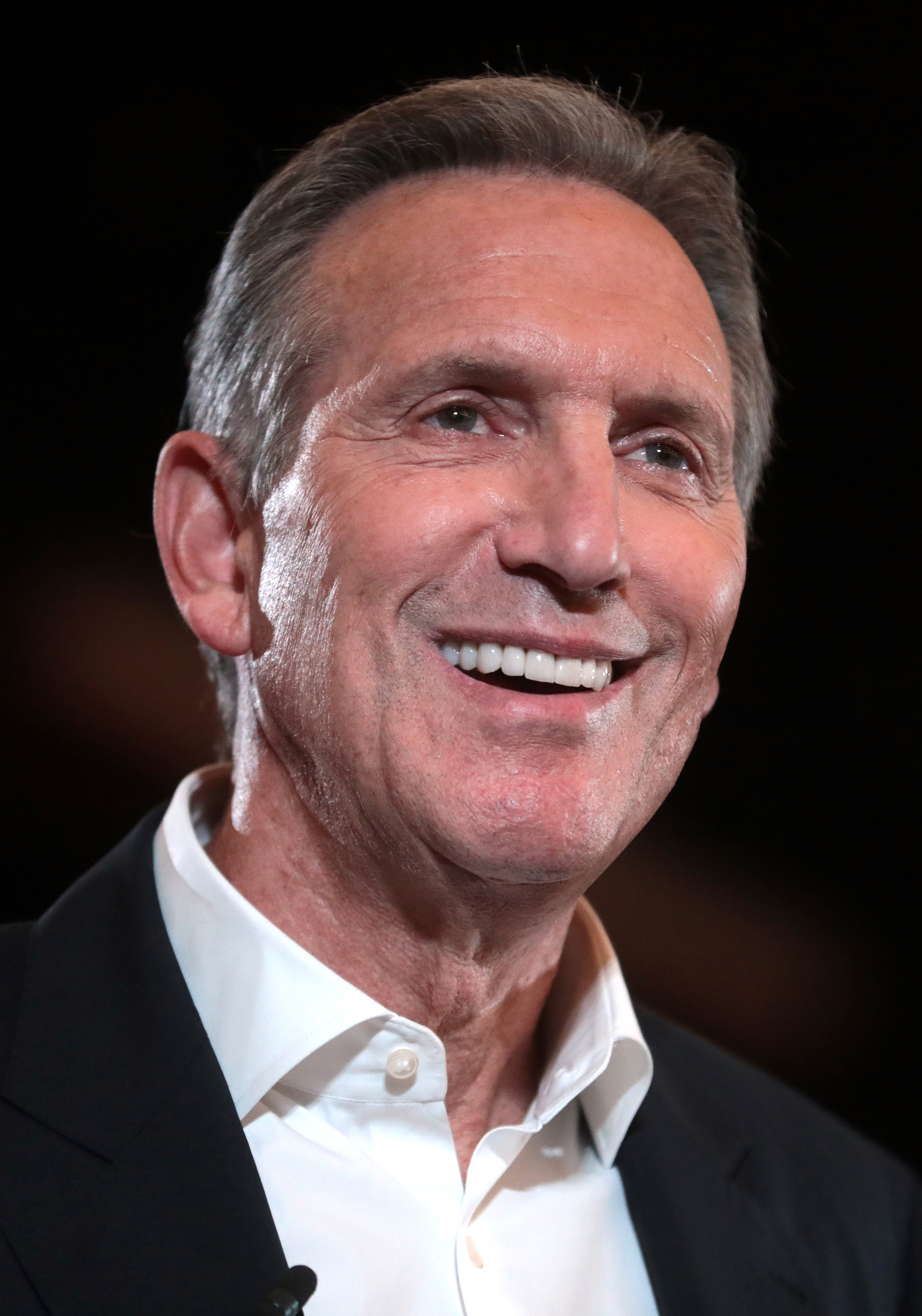
- Schultz in 2019
- Born: July 19, 1953 (age 73); New York City, U.S.
- Education: Northern Michigan University (BA)
- Occupations: Businessman; author
- Known for: Chairman and CEO of Starbucks and co-ownership of Seattle SuperSonics
- Term: 1986–2000; 2008–2017; 2022–2023 (as interim CEO)
- Predecessor: Jim Donald (second term); Kevin Johnson (third term)
- Successor: Orin C. Smith (first term); Kevin Johnson (second term); Laxman Narasimhan (third term)
- Political party: Independent (2019–present)
- Other political affiliations: Democratic (before 2019)
- Spouse: Sheri Kersch (m. 1982)
- Children: 2
- Website: Official website

Signature
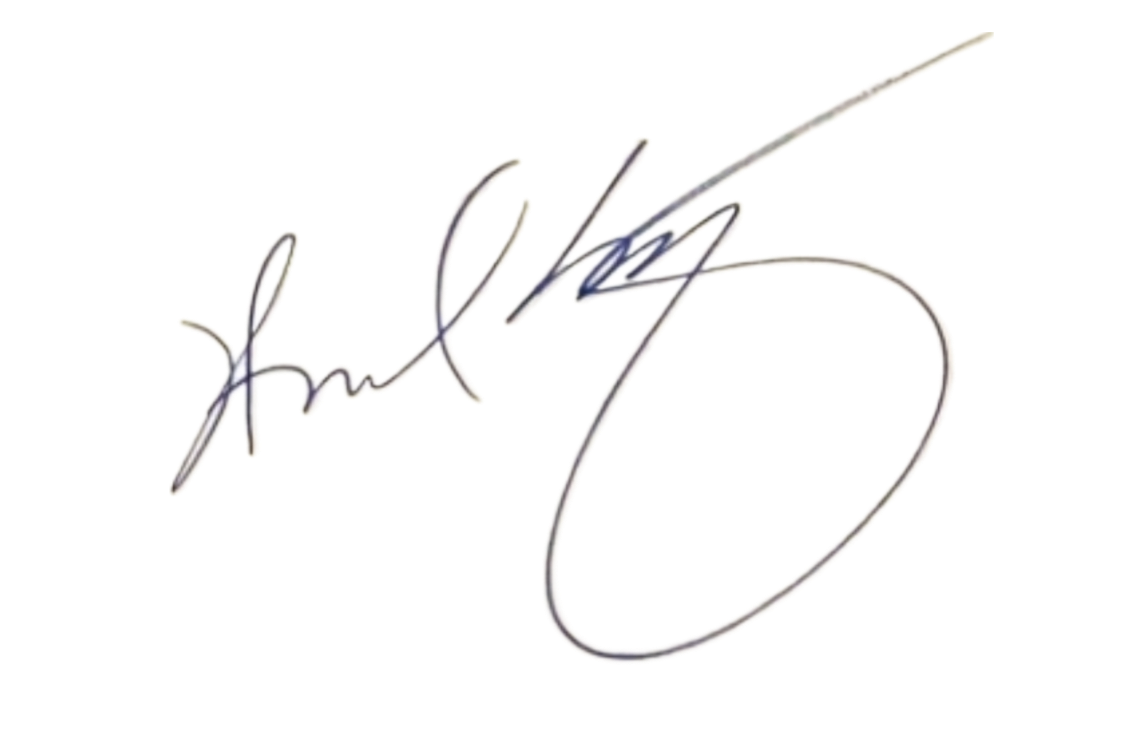

Howard D. Schultz (born July 19, 1953) is an American businessman, entrepreneur, and author who was the chairman and CEO of Starbucks from 1986 to 2000, and from 2008 to 2017, and interim CEO from 2022 to 2023. Schultz owned the Seattle SuperSonics basketball team from 2001 to 2006.

Schultz began working at Starbucks in 1982. He later left and opened Il Giornale, a specialty coffeeshop that merged with Starbucks during the late 1980s. Under Schultz, the company established a large network of stores which has influenced coffee culture in Seattle, the U.S., and internationally. Following large-scale distribution deals, Starbucks became the largest coffee-house chain in the world. Schultz took the company public in 1992 and used a $271 million valuation to double their store count in a series of highly publicized coffee wars. He stepped down as CEO in 2000, succeeded by Orin Smith. Due to the rapid expansion of Starbucks under Schultz's leadership, he has been described as the “Ray Kroc of his generation”.

During the 2008 financial crisis, Schultz returned as chief executive. Succeeding Jim Donald, Schultz led a mass firing of executives and employees and shuttered hundreds of stores. He orchestrated multiple acquisitions of American and Chinese beverage companies, introduced a national loyalty program, and enforced fair trade standards. His aggressive expansion in Chinese markets has been credited with reconciling the country's tea-culture with coffee consumption in China. Schultz was succeeded by Kevin Johnson as CEO in April 2017 and Myron Ullman as chairman in June 2018.

Schultz has written four books on business. He is an outspoken neoliberal. Schultz publicly considered a candidacy in the 2012, 2016, and 2020 U.S. presidential elections as an independent candidate. He declined to join all three contests. His positions on domestic politics are socially liberal and fiscally conservative. In foreign policy, he is seen as a "liberal hawk", favoring American-led international affairs and neoliberalism. Schultz was named the 209th-richest person in the U.S. by Forbes with a net worth of $4.3 billion (October 2020). Schultz started the Schultz Family Foundation to help military veterans and fight youth unemployment.

On March 16, 2022, Starbucks announced that CEO Kevin Johnson was retiring and that Howard Schultz would take over as interim CEO until Laxman Narasimhan took over as CEO in April 2023. On March 20, 2023, Schultz announced that he would be stepping down early from the position.

== Early life and education ==
Howard D. Schultz was born on July 19, 1953, to Ashkenazi Jewish parents, Fred and Elaine Schultz, in Brooklyn, New York. His father was a truck driver, and his mother was a receptionist. Howard has two siblings. Schultz grew up in the Canarsie public housing projects. According to Schultz, his family was poor, although childhood contemporaries recount a middle-class upbringing, with one of his contemporaries referring to the development in which he was raised as "the country club of projects."

Schultz spent his time after school at the Boys Club of New York. He is active in the Boys’ Club of New York's Alumni.

Schultz graduated from Canarsie High School in 1971. He attended Northern Michigan University (NMU) from 1971 to 1975, where he was a member of Tau Kappa Epsilon fraternity, graduating with a B.A. in communications. He had played football, expecting an athletic scholarship but an injury caused him to quit.

== Career ==
=== Early career ===
In 1976, he became a salesman for Xerox in New York. In 1979, he was recruited by French private equity firm PAI Partners to be general manager of a Swedish kitchenware manufacturer's U.S. subsidiary, Hammarplast. At Hammarplast, Schultz was responsible for the coffee machine manufacturer's U.S. operations, and in 1981 he visited the Starbucks Coffee Company in Seattle to fill their plastic cone filter orders.

=== Starbucks ===
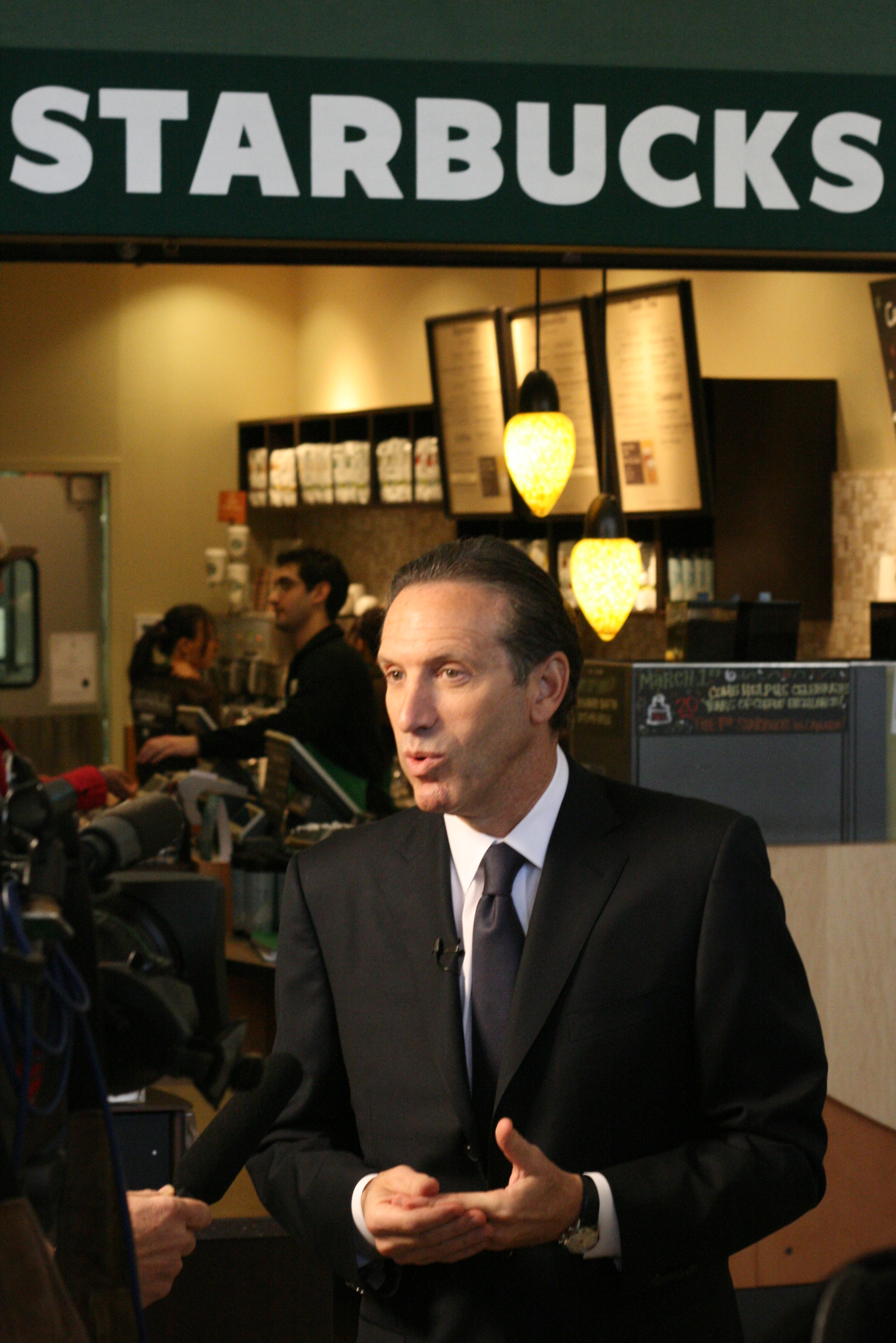
Schultz speaking with press about Starbucks' presence in Canada, 2007

In 1982, at age 29, Schultz was hired at Starbucks as the director of retail operations and marketing. Schultz was exposed to coffee in Italy on a buying trip to Milan, Italy, in 1983. On his return, he worked to persuade company owners Jerry Baldwin and Gordon Bowker to offer traditional espresso beverages in addition to the whole bean coffee, leaf teas, and spices. After a successful pilot of the cafe concept, Baldwin and Bowker were intrigued but, noting the high cost of espresso machines, the relative paucity of expertise for maintenance and repair of the machines in America, and Americans' lack of familiarity with the drink, they decided not to deploy Schultz's idea further and he stepped down from Starbucks to start his own business. Schultz left Starbucks in 1985 to open a store of his own. He needed $400,000 to start his business. Schultz visited over 500 espresso bars in Milan and, with him assuming most of the risk associated with introducing espresso to the American market, Starbucks invested $150,000 in the new venture, with Baldwin receiving a place on its board and Bowker offering unofficial assistance. Another $100,000 investment came from local doctor Ron Margolis. Of the 242 investors Schultz approached, 217 rejected his idea. By 1986, he had raised the money he needed to open the first store, Il Giornale, named after the Milanese newspaper of the same name. The store offered ice cream in addition to coffee, had little seating, and played opera music in the background. Two years later, the original Starbucks management team decided to focus on Peet's Coffee & Tea and sold its Starbucks retail unit to Schultz and Il Giornale for US$3.8 million.

Schultz rebranded Il Giornale with the Starbucks name, and expanded its reach across the United States. This type of market strategy received mixed reception from both customers and competitors. The firm's relations with independent coffeehouse chains were strained, while some owners credited Starbucks with educating customers on coffee. Schultz did not believe in franchising, and made a point of having Starbucks retain ownership of every domestic outlet. Schultz's positioning of Starbucks as a social hub is widely seen as introducing the second wave of coffee culture in the U.S., particularly in Seattle. On June 26, 1992, Starbucks had its initial public offering (IPO) and trading of its common stock under the stock ticker SBUX. The IPO raised $271 million for the company and financed the doubling of their stores. On June 1, 2000, Schultz stepped down as CEO of Starbucks, moving to the new position of chief global strategist to help the company expand internationally. He was succeeded by Orin Smith, who worked with Schultz as his chief financial officer during the 1990s. After coordinating the first store opening in China in January 1999, Schultz took the following year to develop a customer base for coffee in the region. Throughout the late-2000s and early-2010s, Schultz directed the company to plan one to two store openings a day in mainland China. Back in the firm's U.S. market, various coffee wars with McDonalds and Dunkin' lowered Starbucks' marketshare and the stock price fell 75% from 2006 to 2008. While revenue was growing broadly, it was largely dependent on new store openings creating unsustainable (or inorganic) growth.

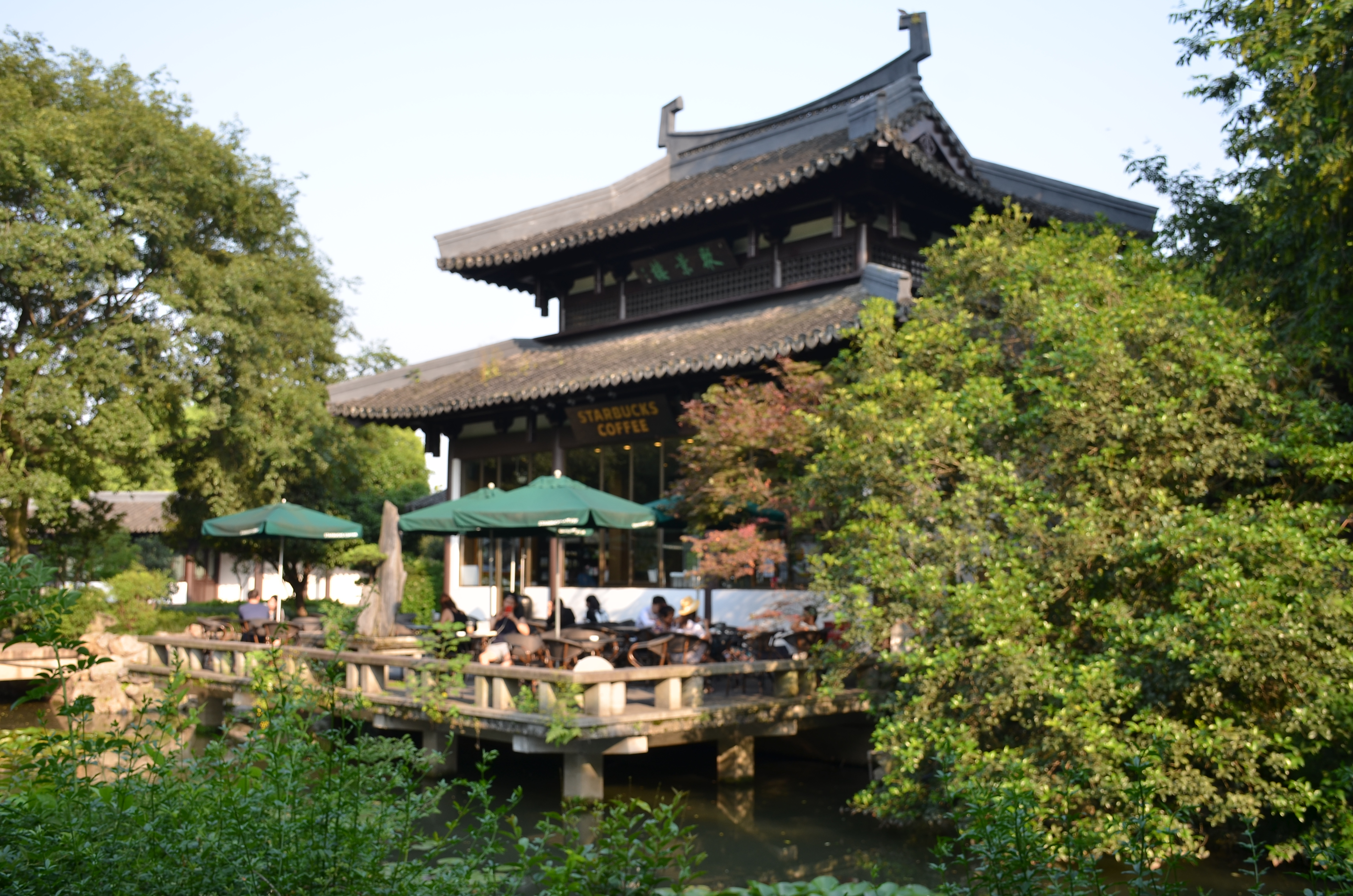
A Starbucks cafe in Xixi National Wetland Park, Hangzhou China

On January 7, 2008, after an eight-year hiatus, Schultz returned as CEO of Starbucks during the height of the 2008 financial crisis. He succeeded Jim Donald who took over from Smith in 2005. The coffeehouse was increasingly criticized for employee work conditions and their internal tipping policies during this time; in March 2009, he and the board approved a $100 million settlement in back tips in a barista-led class action lawsuit in California. He led a mass-firing of executives, closed down hundreds of stores, and temporarily closed all U.S. locations to retrain employees in making espresso. Schultz redoubled and enforced the firm's fair trade and ethical source policies for their coffee bean supply-chain in Africa and other coffee-producing countries. In the succeeding two years, he doubled their annual purchase of fair trade coffee, up to, by some estimates, 40 million pounds. Schultz arranged the appointment of the coffeehouse's first chief technology officer. At this time, Schultz was earning a total compensation of $9.7 million, which included a base salary of $1.2 million, and stock options granted of $7.8 million. In addition to his board membership with Starbucks, Schultz was an early and significant stakeholder in Jamba Juice in 2011, and on the board of payment processing company, Square, Inc., until 2014. During the summer of 2014, Schultz launched the Starbucks College Achievement Plan, a partnership with Arizona State University, which allows all employees at Starbucks working 20 or more hours a week to qualify for free tuition through ASU's online courses. It was reported in 2018 that Schultz had taken a one-dollar annual salary sometime in the past couple of years.

Schultz again stepped down as CEO in December 2016, assuming the position of executive chairman. From 2008 to 2017, Schultz oversaw nearly $100 billion added to the company's market capitalization. From the 1980s to his retirement, a series of coffee wars increased Starbucks from 11 coffeehouses in Seattle to 28,000 stores in 77 countries. On June 4, 2018, Schultz announced that he would retire from active management of Starbucks after 37 years, as he was considering amongst other options a campaign for U.S. president. Kevin Johnson, the firm's president and chief operating officer for the previous two years, succeeded Schultz as CEO while Myron Ullman took over as chairman in June 2018. Schultz would return to the role of CEO in an interim position following Johnson departing the position in March 2022.

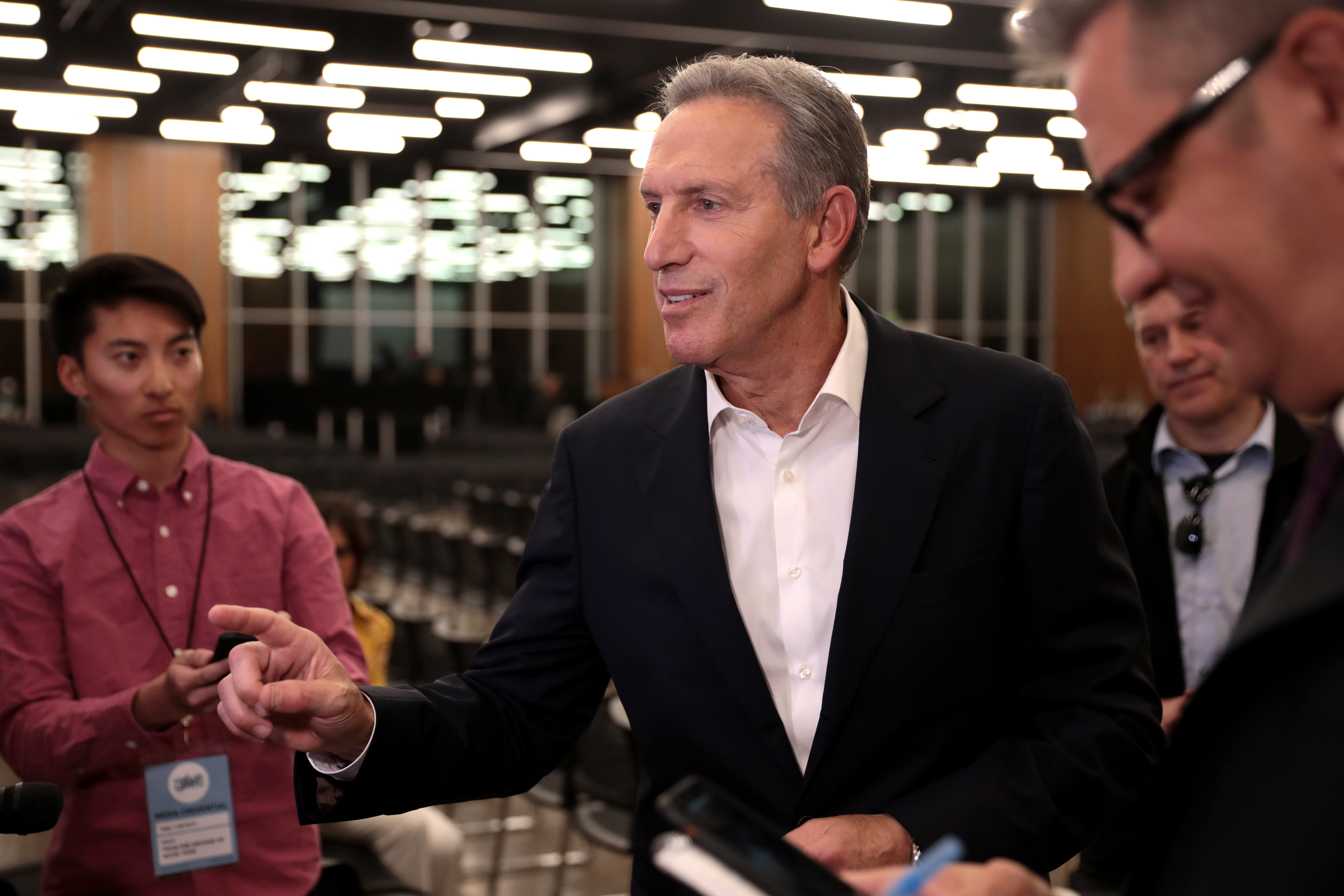
Schultz, as chairman emeritus of Starbucks, in 2019

On March 20, 2023, two weeks before he was projected to turn the leadership of the company over to incoming CEO Laxman Narasimhan, Schultz stepped down as interim CEO of Starbucks. Schultz appeared before the United States Senate Committee on Health, Education, Labor and Pensions on March 29, 2023.

=== Seattle SuperSonics and Seattle Storm ===
In January 2001, Schultz led a group of ten investors who bought the National Basketball Association's Seattle SuperSonics and the Women's National Basketball Association's Seattle Storm from the Ackerley Group for $200 million. During his tenure as the SuperSonics team owner, he was criticized for his naïveté and propensity to run the franchise as a business rather than a sports team. Schultz feuded with player Gary Payton, feeling that Payton disrespected him and the team by not showing up to the first day of training camp in 2002. In February 2006, he stated that the SuperSonics needed $200 million to renovate KeyArena or build a new arena for the team, and if the Washington State Legislature would not approve this, he would look to sell or move the team.

On July 18, 2006, Schultz sold the SuperSonics and Storm to Clay Bennett, chairman of the Professional Basketball Club LLC, an Oklahoma City ownership group, for $350 million, after having failed to convince the city of Seattle to provide public funding to build a new arena in the Greater Seattle area to replace KeyArena. Bennett agreed to a stipulation that he would make a "good-faith best effort" for one year to keep both teams in Seattle. The sincerity of the good-faith effort was widely disputed by the way Bennett acted and by direct quotes from his partner Aubrey McClendon. On January 8, 2008, Bennett sold the Storm to Force 10 Hoops, LLC, an ownership group of four Seattle women, which kept the team in Seattle.

Schultz filed a lawsuit against Bennett – in April 2008 – to rescind the July 2006 sale based on what Schultz claimed was fraud and intentional misrepresentation. However, Schultz dropped the lawsuit in August 2008. On July 2, 2008, the city of Seattle reached a settlement with the new ownership group and the SuperSonics moved to Oklahoma City and became the Thunder for the 2008–09 NBA season. The sale to the out-of-state owners considerably damaged Schultz's popularity in Seattle. In a local newspaper poll, Schultz was judged "most responsible" for the team leaving the city. Ten years later, in 2019, Schultz accepted full responsibility for the sale. "Selling the Sonics as I did is one of the biggest regrets of my professional life. I should have been willing to lose money until a local buyer emerged. I am forever sorry."

== Author ==
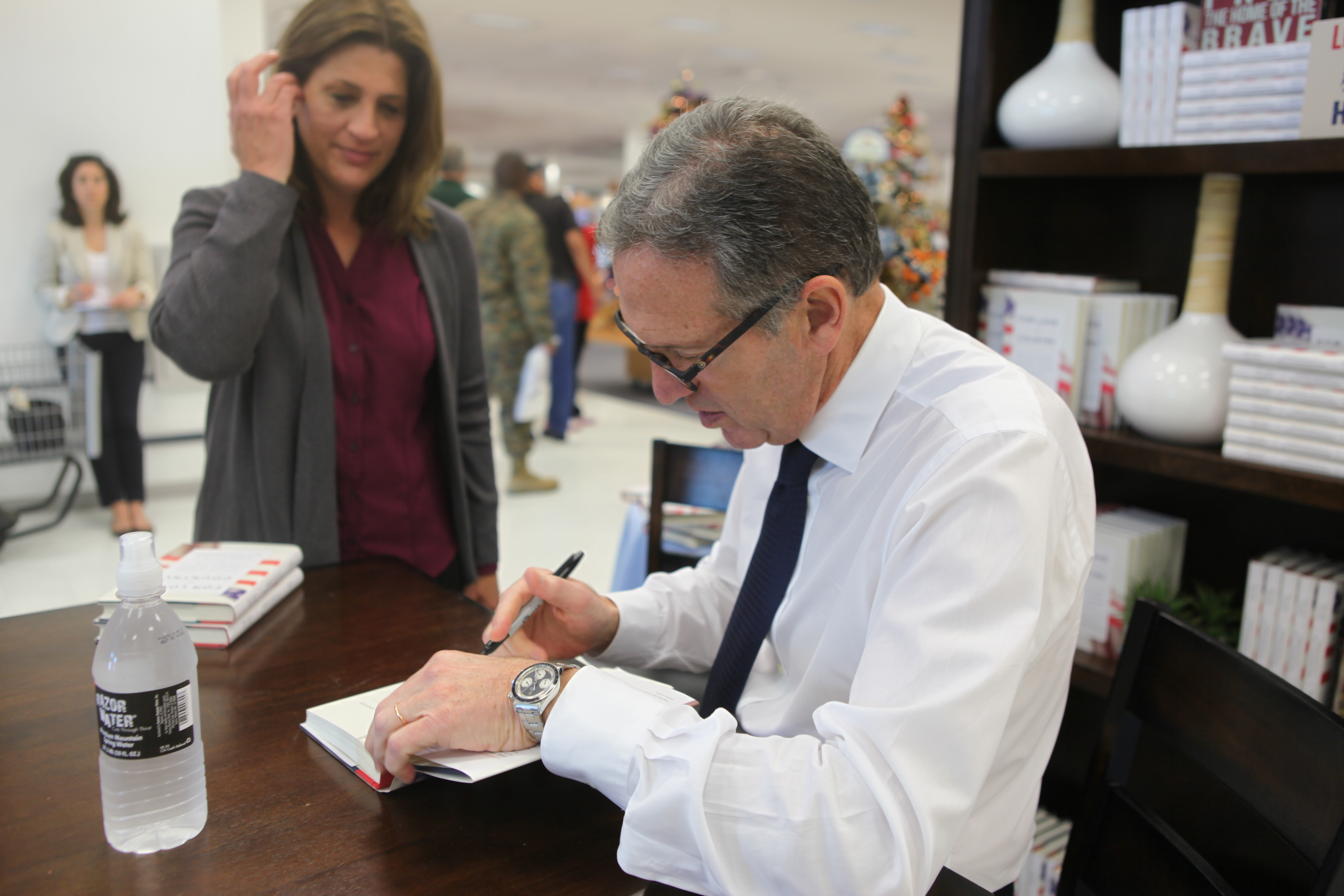
Schultz signing a book during a book tour in 2014

Schultz has written four books, three of which incorporate business memoir-style narratives. According to the Free Library of Philadelphia, his books are known to be a blend of "part memoir and part manifesto of corporate social responsibility". At the start of 2019, Schultz released an online class that covered the business leadership topics discussed in his books on the MasterClass platform. Organizational consultant Warren Bennis has influenced Schultz's writing.

His first book, Pour Your Heart Into It: How Starbucks Built a Company One Cup at a Time was written in 1997 with Dori Jones Yang. His second book, Onward: How Starbucks Fought for Its Life Without Losing Its Soul, co-written with Joanne Gordon, was published in 2011. Jeff Bailey, of the Los Angeles Times, called the book "self-flattering" and criticized its "mostly perfunctory account of Starbucks' actual problems". Publishers Weekly called the book "a personal, suspenseful, and surprisingly open account" of the rise of Starbucks. Kirkus Reviews praised the book's "immense detail" but critiqued Schultz's coverage of "outside criticisms of his performance". The Seattle Times was critical, saying the book could only "appeal to business types but probably not to the average latte drinker". Fast Company placed Onward within the top five books that "[predicted] the future of workplace leadership" in 2014. All sale proceeds from the book were donated to the Starbucks Foundation, the firm's main charity.

His third book, For Love of Country: What Our Veterans Can Teach Us About Citizenship, Heroism, and Sacrifice, co-written with Rajiv Chandrasekaran, was published in 2014. The New York Times Book Review calling it "well-written" and "formidable." It was later added to the Times' 2014 Winter Reading List. In writing a review for The Wall Street Journal U.S. Army major general Robert H. Scales stated "after reading this moving book I'll not likely pass a Starbucks again without stopping for a patriotic cup." The Washington Post published a similarly positive review.

In 2019, he published his fourth book, From the Ground Up: A Journey to Reimagine the Promise of America. The book was widely seen as a candidate memoir as it was published right before the 2020 United States presidential election. His book received 1.9/5 stars on Amazon, after some Democratic voters gave negative reviews, due his possible candidacy splitting the Democratic vote. Rolling Stone called the book "stunningly boring" and an "autobiography of a pretentious oligarch." A book promotion stop at Harvard University led to a small student protest. From the Ground Up was featured on The Wall Street Journal's bestseller list in February, and was listed as a New York Times bestseller for 2019. Reuters rated the book highly, yet called it "caffeine free" for its inability to "harness his business success" in a potential White House run.

== Political views ==
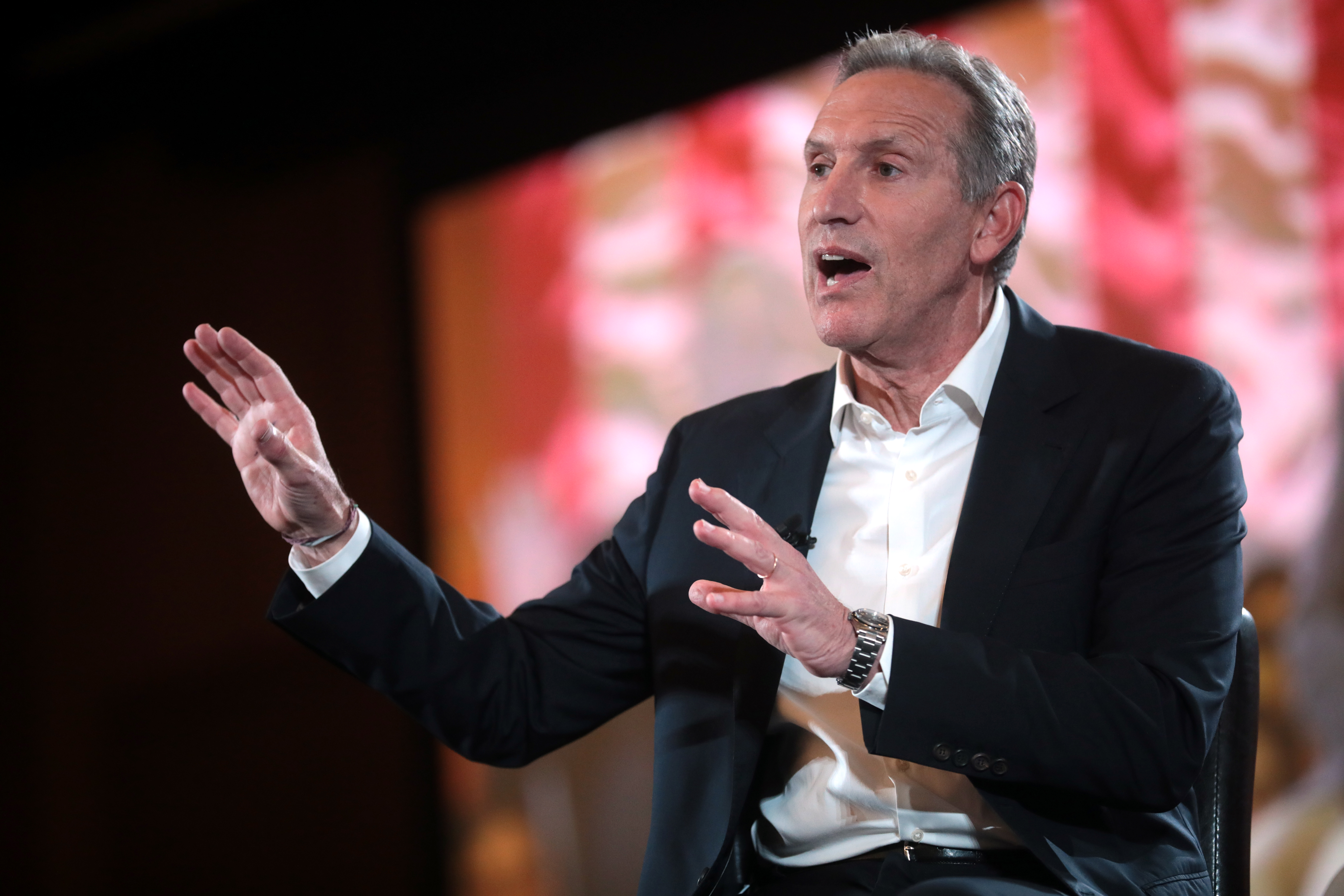
Schultz speaking at Arizona State University in 2019

Schultz is an outspoken neoliberal, centrist, technocratic, and political independent. Schultz's political positions are similar to the Democratic Party platform. Schultz supports free trade, a balanced budget, comprehensive tax reform, gun control, and same-sex marriage.

Schultz hosted a fundraiser in his Seattle home for John Edwards during the 2008 presidential election cycle, eventually donating to the campaigns of Hillary Clinton and Barack Obama. Since 2012, Schultz's public statements have led to press speculation that he would run for President of the United States. In both the 2008 and 2012 United States presidential election he endorsed the presidential candidacy of Barack Obama. Schultz donated to Barack Obama's 2008 presidential campaign twice, once on June 30, 2007, for $2,300, and again on October 24, 2008, for $2,300. He endorsed Democratic candidate Hillary Clinton in the 2016 United States presidential election.

=== Labor unions ===
Howard Schultz has been taking anti-union actions at Starbucks since the late 1980s. When unions were able to form at the company, they disbanded soon afterward, due to corporate reaction to their formation.

In 2009, a bill known as the Employee Free Choice Act was being proposed in Congress. It would allow unions to form by simply gathering a majority of signatures in the workplace, what is known as a "card check", obviating the need to have secret ballot union-elections. Schultz, along with the CEOs of Costco, and Whole Foods lobbied to have this provision removed from the bill, and a provision making it easier for unions to secure their first bargaining agreement. The Employee Free Choice Act never made it into law.

Schultz's overall vision on unions, and their place at Starbucks were published in a 2012 edition of his memoir entitled "Pour Your Heart Into It: How Starbucks Built a Company One Cup at a Time". Schultz wrote,

"I was convinced that under my leadership, employees would come to realize that I would listen to their concerns. If they had faith in me and my motives, they wouldn't need a union."

In 2022, as union organizing campaigns started to form at Starbucks, and gain victories, Schultz held a town hall meeting as he returned to the company as interim CEO. In the town hall Schultz said that Starbucks was "under assault from unionization", "outside forces", and that Starbucks did not need an intermediary between management, and labor. During these union organizing campaigns by Starbucks employees, the corporation has been firing employees who have engaged in unionizing. One employee who had been working to organize Starbucks workers in Arizona was fired just one hour after Schultz had finished speaking at his town hall. These terminations took place despite a notice of formal complaint from the National Labor Relations Board against the retaliatory practices Starbucks had taken against employees who were working to unionize the corporation.

On March 29, 2023, Schultz testified before the United States Senate Committee on Health, Education, Labor and Pensions. In response to most of the questions Schultz gave the same answer: "I support the law, and I also take offense with you categorizing me or Starbucks as a union buster when that is not true."

During the hearing Sen. Bernie Sanders asked Schultz whether he would follow the ruling of NLRB administrative law judge Michael Rosas. Rosas had found that Starbucks had engaged in “egregious and widespread misconduct” in dealing with the unionizing efforts of its employees in Buffalo. As a result of these findings he ruled that the company must reinstate the employees they had fired, and Schultz must either read to his employees a letter informing them of their rights or be present for a meeting in which workers are informed of their rights. Schultz responded that he would not be following this ruling as he believed that Starbucks had not broken the law.

=== Climate change ===
As chief executive of Starbucks, Schultz has commented on the impact climate change has on coffee production. He has opposed the United States withdrawal from the Paris Agreement. To finance a green economy, he has advocated for a combination of taxing oil and gas as well as harnessing wind energy. Schultz has criticized the 2018 Green New Deal for being economically unrealistic.

=== Bipartisanship ===
In December 2012 Schultz penned an open letter to various newspapers about an upcoming initiative at Starbucks involving partisan gridlock in Washington, D.C.. On December 27, Starbucks employees in Washington, D.C., were asked to write "come together" on all cups distributed, to encourage bipartisanship in the federal government. During his exploratory 2020 presidential campaign, Schultz explained to multiple media outlets that, if elected, he wished to exclusively legislate with bipartisan support. This stance includes the appointment and confirmations of U.S. Supreme Court justices.

=== Fiscal discipline ===
Schultz is averse to debt and, politically, is a deficit hawk. During his 2019 exploratory bid for the presidency, Schultz framed his candidacy as that of a socially liberal deficit hawk with fiscally moderate leanings. In June 2018, Schultz stated in an interview that he thought the national debt is "the greatest threat domestically to the country" and that "we have to go after entitlements." He has also stated that the nation's annual sovereign interest payments, totaling over $400 billion in 2020, is "unsustainable." President Barack Obama's chief economist, Jason Furman, was critical of Schultz's hard-lined "obsessive" position against sovereign debt: "America is not a company." Furman stated in February 2020, "many successful companies are much more leveraged than the United States."

=== Trade ===
Throughout the 2018 start and continuation of the U.S. trade war against China, Schultz has been critical of its motivations and handling, and has called for a reduction of trade tariffs and other import-export taxes.

In 2008, Schultz doubled the amount of fair trade coffee Starbucks bought. By the end of 2009, 65% of all coffee product was fair trade and by 2015, nearly all of it was. Starbucks signed an agreement with the government of Ethiopia in 2007 to ensure increased pay to farmers. Schultz committed to an agreement that all 747 stores in Britain would be certified fair trade by year-end. The agreement made Starbucks the largest buyer of fair trade coffee.

=== Business ===
Schultz claims to be a supporter of the free market. In 2020 he described the treatment of business and capitalism by American society as "vilification". During the COVID-19 pandemic (COVID-19), advocated for fiscal stimulus to small businesses harmed during the crisis. Schultz described the Coronavirus Aid, Relief, and Economic Security Act as insufficient, and criticized the Act's Paycheck Protection Program (PPP) for being a temporary solution. On April 21, he called for the federal government to institute a "Marshall Plan" for small business, in the form of federally-backed loans.

=== Tax reform ===
Schultz said he supported "comprehensive tax reform" in January 2019. He opposed Alexandria Ocasio-Cortez's proposal to raise the marginal tax rate on income over $10 million to 70%, saying it was "punitive" and contrary to the American Dream. He also opposed Donald Trump's passage of the Tax Cuts and Jobs Act of 2017, which lowered high-income and corporate taxes. During a CNN town hall, he stated that he wanted the marginal tax rate for the highest-earning citizens to be increased from 37% to 39%. Schultz is against lowering taxes for large corporations, favoring tax cuts for middle-market and small businesses.

=== Same-sex marriage ===
Starbucks took an institutional stance in favor of same-sex marriage in 2013 (two years prior to US Federal recognition). In response to a backlash from conservative and religious groups, Schultz told a shareholder meeting that opponents of the stance should "Sell your shares", and "buy shares in another company." His response was widely publicized, with The Washington Post stating: "Schultz [did] something CEOs rarely do: He told off a shareholder." Fortune wrote that Schultz "[took] on gay marriage before it was a topic most executives would even touch."

=== Healthcare ===
Under his leadership Starbucks became the first U.S. company to offer part-time workers, particularly baristas, healthcare. Schultz is against Medicare for All. He has vocally criticized Republican-led efforts to repeal the ACA as uncooperative.

=== Gun control ===
Schultz supports gun control and universal background checks. In July 2013, Starbucks customers brought in their weapons and guns into local stores to show appreciation for the coffeehouse's support of the Second Amendment. Later in September, as CEO, Schultz asked customers to no longer bring guns into its stores.

=== Immigration ===
Schultz has supported a pathway to citizenship for illegal immigrants who had entered the United States as children. He called for greater border security, but vocally opposed President Donald Trump's proposal of a border wall. In 2017, Schultz got into a highly publicized argument with President Trump after he instructed Starbucks to disregard an executive order barring Syrian refugees into the country. Within 24 hours of the executive order, Schultz wrote to his employees that recent immigrants and refugees, particularly those with strong ties to the U.S. military, would be fast-tracked to employment. President Trump then called on his supporters to boycott Starbucks.

=== Veterans' affairs ===
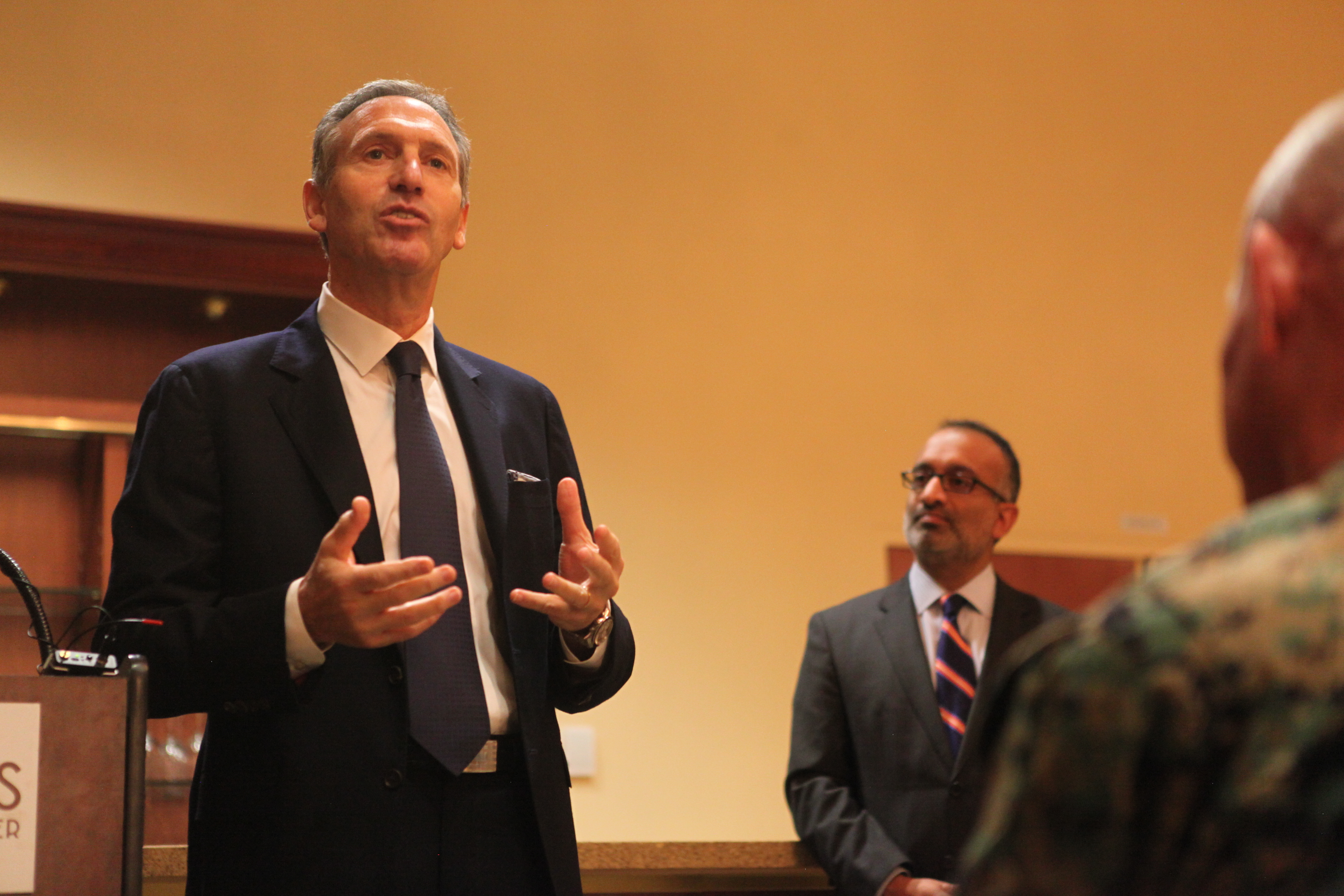
Schultz speaking to U.S. Marines and Sailors at Camp Pendleton in California, 2014

In 2015, Schultz founded Onward Veterans, a private foundation to help post-9/11 military veterans transition to civilian life. In 2014, Schultz authored his first non-business book, For Love of Country: What Our Veterans Can Teach Us About Citizenship, Heroism, and Sacrifice, co-written with Rajiv Chandrasekaran. The book discussed the U.S. military's role in the Iraq War and War in Afghanistan, and their transitions back into civilian life. To market the book he expanded tuition support for veterans families.

Over a radio interview in March 2019, when asked if he would be an effective commander-in-chief, Schultz responded: "I probably have spent more time in the last decade certainly than anyone running for president with the military." His comments were criticized by Pete Buttigieg and Tulsi Gabbard, both of whom served in the military, for being tone deaf. Schultz later apologized for his remarks. Schultz's tentative 2020 presidential candidacy was endorsed by former U.S. Army General Peter W. Chiarelli.

=== Washington state politics ===
In 2012, Schultz had Starbucks express support for Washington state's Referendum 74, which legalized same-sex marriage in that state. Schultz opposed Seattle's ordinance to raise the local minimum wage to $15, which at the time was the highest in the nation. The ordinance passed.

From 2005 to 2019, he reportedly voted in 11 of 38 municipal elections. His voting record in Seattle has been described by The Seattle Times as a "pattern of ignoring many local elections over the decades." The paper reported in 2020 that while Schultz is heavily involved in the state's political debates, he often "doesn't show up to vote" in various municipal elections including that of the city's mayor and city council. Washington governor Jay Inslee, who was running against Schultz in the 2020 election, criticized him for his absence in state politics.

Congressman George Nethercutt, a moderate Republican, opined that Eastern Washington "may like what they hear and vote for [Schultz]" more than the Western region.

=== Foreign policy ===
Schultz has been described as a foreign policy "liberal hawk", favoring socially liberal politics domestically and aggressive, interventionist policies abroad. Generally, he is a supporter of neoliberal institutionalism and international cooperation. In line with this, Schultz advocates for a U.S.-centered unipolar world where countries work with America to ensure stability and peace.

- United Kingdom: During the 2009 economic crisis, Schultz stated in a highly publicized interview with CNBC that "the place that concerns us the most is western Europe, and specifically the UK. The UK is in a spiral". His comments were meant to express concern with the levels of unemployment and consumer confidence in the United Kingdom. The British Business Secretary at the time, Peter Mandelson, responded negatively to the statement saying that "the UK was not spiralling, although I've noticed Starbucks is in a great deal of trouble." Mandelson later suggested that Schultz was projecting his own company's trouble in the United Kingdom onto the wider national economy. Starbucks issued an office apology soon thereafter.
- Syria: Schultz criticized the U.S. military withdrawal from Syria in 2019, saying the move had "damaged America's relationships with foreign allies." Furthermore, Schultz lamented the "power vacuum" left by the U.S. in the Middle East as a result of their withdrawal. He supported the idea of leaving a skeletal army force in the region to ensure a minimum level of stability and U.S. influence.
- Russia: He is a vocal opponent of Russian influence in U.S. politics, calling the country an “enemy of the United States.”
- China: The commensurate rise of China in the international sphere with the U.S. prompted Schultz to call the country "neither an enemy nor an ally, but a fierce competitor." According to Foreign Policy, his corporate interests in Starbucks could make him implement pro-Chinese policies and legislation. Hedge fund manager Bill Ackman similarly said that Schultz's election to the U.S. presidency would essentially be an insurance policy for Starbucks. "The last thing the Chinese would do is go after the next American president's company," Ackman told the New York Times in 2020. Schultz has repeatedly praised the country's One Belt Road initiative, an infrastructure plan aimed at better connecting territorial China and improving foreign direct investment.
- Israel: Schultz was involved in a long-standing group chat from October 2023 through early May 2024 with some of the United States' most powerful business leaders with the stated goals of "chang[ing] the narrative" in favor of Israel and "help[ing] win the war" on U.S. public opinion following Hamas's October 7th attack on Israel. Group members included Dell founder and CEO Michael Dell, Kind snack company founder Daniel Lubetzky, hedge fund managers Daniel Loeb and Bill Ackman, billionaire Len Blavatnik, real estate investor Joseph Sitt, and Joshua Kushner, the founder of Thrive Capital and brother to Jared Kushner, president Donald Trump's son-in-law. The group also included non-American citizens, such as Cypriot-Israeli billionaire real estate investor Yakir Gabay. Members of the group chat, including Schultz, discussed how they received private briefings by, and worked closely with, members of the Israeli government, including former Israeli prime minister Naftali Bennett; Benny Gantz, a member of the Israeli war cabinet; and Israel's ambassador to the United States, Michael Herzog. Group members also held a video call in April 2024 with New York City Mayor Eric Adams in an effort to, according to reporting by The Washington Post, "pressure Columbia’s president and trustees to permit the mayor to send police to the campus" to shut down criticism of Israel's offensive military operations in Gaza, which many campus protesters, intergovernmental and non-governmental organizations, civil servants, and governments around the world have alleged to be genocide. During the video call, group members discussed making political donations to Adams. It is unknown whether Schultz was present on the video call. While Schultz confirmed his membership in the group and his presence at private briefings by Israeli officials, a spokesperson said he "did not participate in, or contribute financially to, any of the group's work."

== Political elections ==
=== 2012 presidential election ===
At the start of the 2012 United States presidential election Schultz's name was floated as a potential Democratic candidate. After he instructed Starbucks employees in Washington to write "come together" on all cups to encourage bipartisanship in the federal government on December 26, press speculation intensified. However, Schultz "batted down" these reports days later and confirmed that he was not running for political office. He continued to publicly bemoan the political climate at the time, saying he was "not optimistic about the leadership" of the U.S. on national television. Papers continued to question the finality of his decision with New York Magazine writing "We look forward to your 2016 campaign".

=== 2016 presidential election ===
In late September and early August 2015, press speculation began to surface about a potential run in the upcoming 2016 United States presidential election for Schultz. Maureen Dowd, of The New York Times, broke a story on August 1 that friends of "America's lord of latte, Howard Schultz, have been pressing him to join the Democratic primary." Over the next couple of days media outlets began to speculate if Schultz was going to make a formal announcement. According to Fortune, he was positioned to be a "worthy party back-up to [Hillary] Clinton." Schultz wrote a New York Times op-ed on August 6, 2015, denying this, stating, "Despite the encouragement of others, I have no intention of entering the presidential fray. I'm not done serving Starbucks." Newspapers such as The Atlantic, billed Schultz as the "liberal Donald Trump" due to his comparable career as a businessman and wealth.

=== 2020 presidential election ===
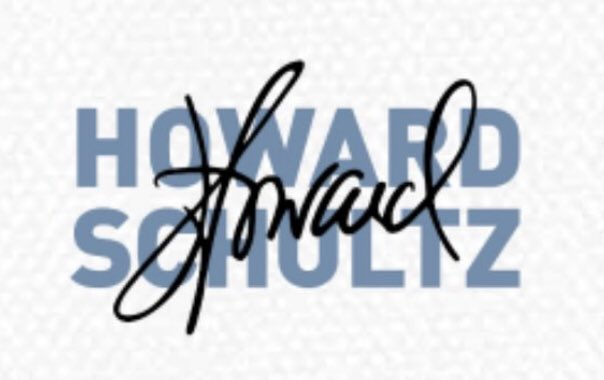
Howard Schultz presidential campaign logo, designed in 2019 in case of a run for President

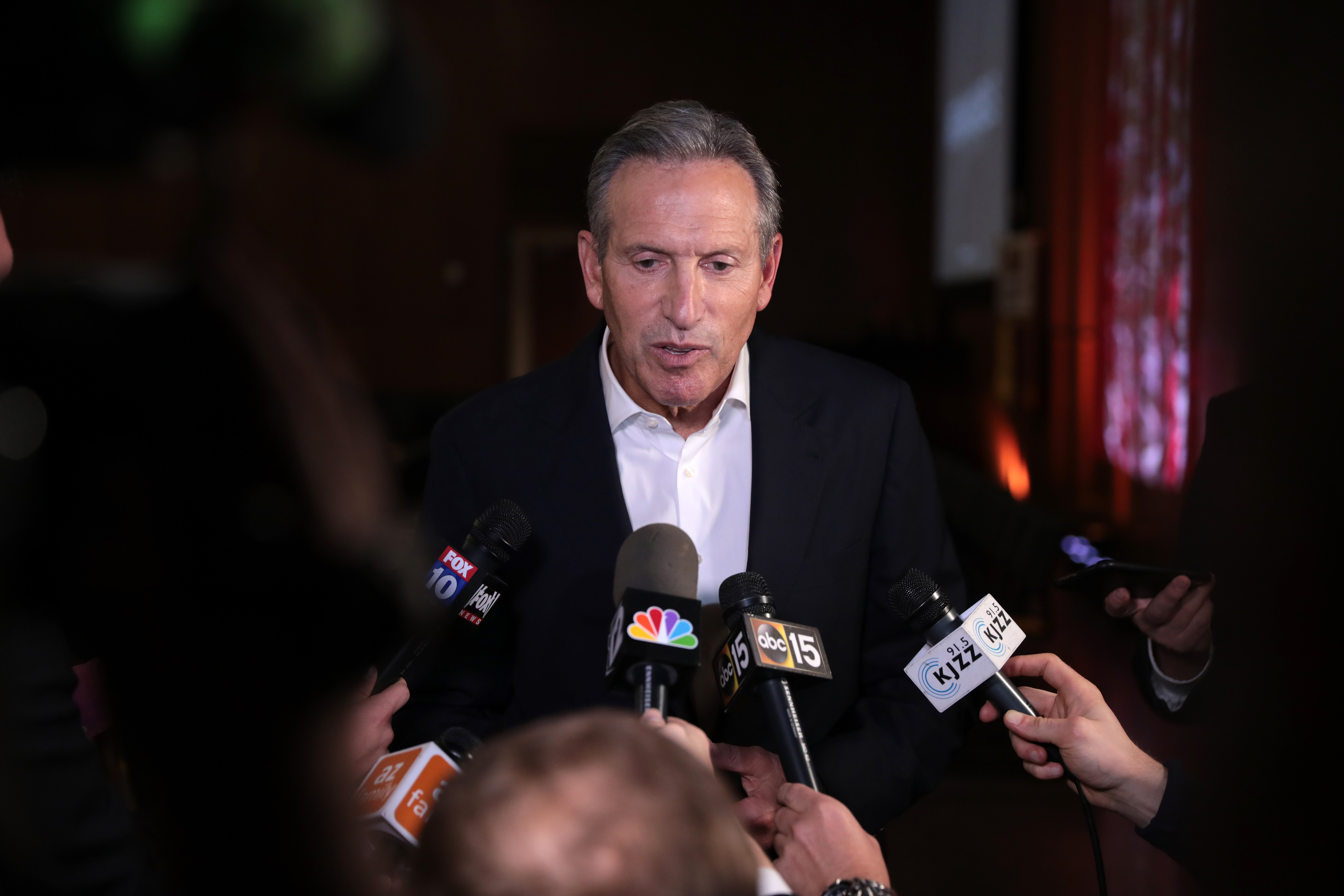
Schultz being interviewed in 2020

After Schultz stepped down from Starbucks in 2018, political commentators speculated whether he would run in the 2020 United States presidential election. There was additional encouragement from a draft movement called Ready for Schultz. He hired Steve Schmidt and Bill Burton, two political consultants, to assess his candidacy. On January 27, 2019, he stated in an interview with 60 Minutes that he was exploring a run for president as an independent candidate, and that he considered running as a centrist. He was reportedly willing to spend $300 to $500 million on the 2020 election. Schultz's proposed independent candidacy was widely condemned by Democrats who argued that Schultz's third-party candidacy would help to re-elect President Trump by splitting the vote of those opposed to the president. Political scientist Larry Sabato said that Schultz's candidacy was likely to benefit Trump. However, a CNN analysis believed that "running on a deficit-reduction platform might end up syphoning as many Republican moderates away from Trump as liberals or independents away from the Democratic nominee." In response to claims that his candidacy would benefit Trump, Schultz said, "Nobody wants to see Donald Trump removed from office more than me." His first town hall in Seattle received mixed reception with protestors holding up "venti mistake" and "grande ego" banners while his actual speech was well received. As a large shareholder of Starbucks stock, Schultz was repeatedly asked about potentially selling all of his holdings if elected to the White House. "There's multiple ways to do this, set up a blind trust, do lots of things to remove any conflict of interest" he replied. He had, however, promised to release all of his tax returns if elected.

Later in February, Schultz said he would stay out of the race if the Democrats nominated "a centrist Democrat." In May 2019, Schultz delayed his decision and by September 6, officially ruled out a presidential run, stating that it wasn't the best way to "serve our country at this time." The eventual progression of candidate Joe Biden as the presumptive nominee motivated Schultz to step aside due to their overlapping political ideologies. While he had not officially endorsed Biden for the presidency at the time, Schultz had stated in interviews that he "admires" the candidate. However, on September 14, 2020, Schultz endorsed Biden, and called on Americans to vote for Biden "for the future of our republic".

== Personal life ==
In 1982, Schultz married Sheri Kersch, with whom he has two children. His son, Jordan, is a sports analyst and NFL insider currently working for Bleacher Report. They lived in Seattle's Madison Park neighborhood, having previously lived near Madrona. In 2026, they moved to a $44 million penthouse at the Four Seasons Private Residences at The Surf Club in Surfside, Florida.Schultz is a noted coffee aficionado, reportedly drinking four to five cups of coffee every day.

=== Wealth ===
Schultz was named the 209th-richest person in the U.S. in October 2020 by Forbes with a net worth of $4.3 billion. His exploration of running for political office has prompted calls for him to sell all of his stock holdings in Starbucks to appease any conflict of interest. Although not firmly committing to sell his shares upon election, Schultz has expressed interest in setting up a blind trust to hold his shares. However, Foreign Policy noted that even if in a blind trust, his interest in the shares could still prompt a conflict of interest because the shares' performance is linked with the company's performance. In 1998, Schultz established venture capital firm Maveron with investment banker Dan Levitan. He and Levitan primarily invest in start-up companies and seeding consumer-focused companies, such as eBay, Shutterfly, and Zulily. As of July 2014, the venture capital firm was worth $1.3 billion in assets under management (AUM). As of July 2022, Schultz's net worth is US$3.9 billion.

Schultz is the owner of 'PI', a 77-metre luxury superyacht built by Feadship for $120 million.

=== Philanthropy ===
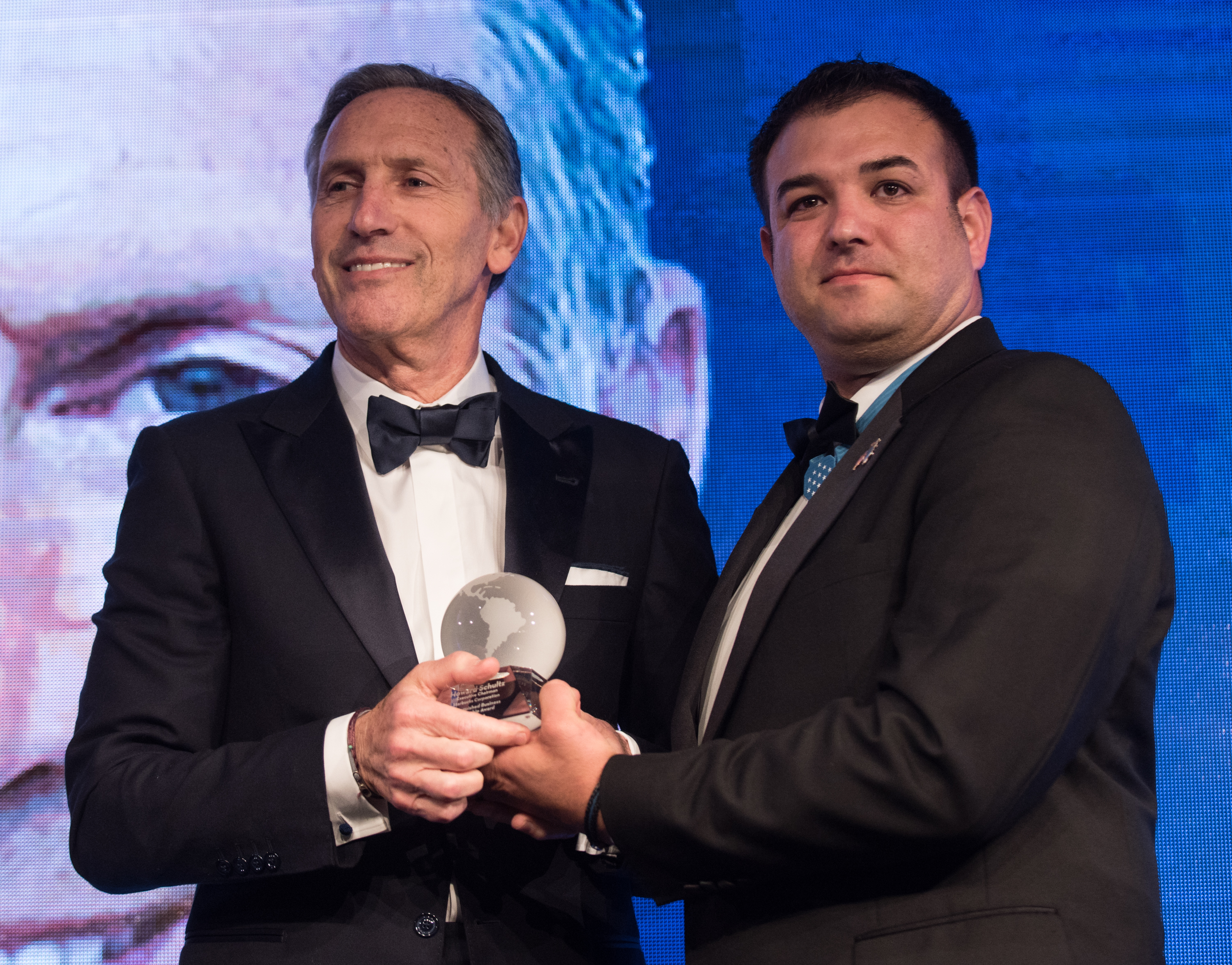
Schultz receiving an award in Washington, D.C., 2018

In 1996, Howard and Sheri Schultz co-founded the Schultz Family Foundation, which supports Onward Youth, aimed at promoting employment for young people between the ages of 16 and 24 who are not in school and not working, and Onward Veterans, which is poised to help post-9/11 military veterans to successfully transition to civilian life.

After the October 7th 2023 attacks on Israel by Hamas, the Schultz foundation released a press release on the 13th of October stating that "we join millions around the world who will not remain silent bystanders to evil" and that "More will follow, including support to address the trauma and humanitarian needs that are unfolding". Later on 26 October 2023 Starbucks released another press release further clarifying Schultz and the company's position. The press release stated that Schultz and the company had never sent profits to the Israeli government or army. It did not discuss the Schultz foundation.

=== Awards and honors ===
In 1998, Schultz received the 'Israel 50th Anniversary Tribute Award' for "playing a key role in promoting a close alliance between the United States and Israel". In 1999 AIDs Action awarded Schultz the National Leadership Award for philanthropic and educational efforts to battle AIDS. Schultz was named Fortune magazine's 2011 "Businessperson of the Year" for his initiatives in the economy and job market. Fortune went on to list him as the most generous CEO of 2015, for Starbucks' healthcare coverage, educational opportunities, and employee stock options.

Schultz spoke at the 2017 Arizona State University commencement ceremony and was presented with an honorary Doctor of humane letters degree. In November 2017, the NAACP Legal Defense and Educational Fund presented Schultz with the National Equal Justice Award.

== Books ==
- Schultz, Howard; Yang, Dori Jones (1997), Pour Your Heart Into It: How Starbucks Built a Company One Cup at a Time, New York: Hyperion, ISBN 0786863153
- Schultz, Howard; Gordon, Joanne (2011), Onward: How Starbucks Fought for Its Life without Losing Its Soul, New York: Rodale, ISBN 9781605292885
- Schultz, Howard; Chandrasekaran, Rajiv (2014), For Love of Country: What Our Veterans Can Teach Us About Citizenship, Heroism, and Sacrifice, New York: Vintage, ISBN 9781101872826
- Schultz, Howard; Gordon, Joanne (2019), From the Ground Up: A Journey to Reimagine the Promise of America, New York: Random House, ISBN 9780525509448

== See also ==
- History of Starbucks
- List of Northern Michigan University alumni
- List of Forbes' World Billionaires

Business positions
Preceded by Jerry Baldwin	Starbucks Chairman and CEO; 1986–2000; 2008–2017; 2022–2023 (interim)	Succeeded by Orin C. Smith
Preceded by Jim Donald	Starbucks Chairman and CEO; 1986–2000; 2008–2017; 2022–2023 (interim)	Succeeded by Kevin Johnson
Preceded by Kevin Johnson	Starbucks Chairman and CEO; 1986–2000; 2008–2017; 2022–2023 (interim)	Succeeded by Laxman Narasimhan
Sporting positions
Preceded by Barry Ackerley	Seattle SuperSonics principal owner 2001–2006	Succeeded by Clay Bennett
Preceded by Barry Ackerley	Seattle Storm principal owner 2001–2006	Succeeded by Clay Bennett
