= Orthex =

Finnish plastics manufacturer

Orthex Oyj
- Type: Julkinen osakeyhtiö (public company)
- Industry: Consumer products
- Founded: 1956; 70 years ago
- Founder: Aulis Kallonen
- Headquarters: Espoo, Finland
- Key people: Alexander Rosenlew, CEO, Sanna Suvanto-Harsaae, chairman of the board
- Products: plastic household items
- Revenue: 87.2 million € (2025)
- Number of employees: 300 (2025)
- Subsidiaries: Oy Orthex Finland Ab, Orthex Sweden AB, Orthex Kitchen AB, Orthex Norway AS, Orthex Denmark A/S, Orthex Germany GmbH
- Website: www.orthexgroup.com

Orthex Oyj is a Finnish company that manufactures and markets plastic household products such as storage boxes, kitchenware and utensils. Orthex has manufactured some of the very common items in Finnish homes. In the example over 8 of 10 households owned the Orthex freezer box Jäänalle and the 10-liter bucket according to a survey conducted by Ilta-Sanomat in 2019. Orthex's classic sled was described as the most common kids sled over the years by Helsingin Sanomat in 2005.

In 2019, bio- and recycled plastics accounted for 14% of the raw material used by Orthex. In 2018 Orthex and Stora Enso released a biocomposite for food safe products made from wood fibers and saccharum officinarum.

== History ==
=== 1950s ===
Aulis Kallonen bought his first plastic machine and began making plastic products in his family's basement in the 1950s. The first product was a shirt clip that was needed for packing men's shirts.

=== 1956-1979 Orth-Plast ===
Orth-Plast, a Danish company, had founded a Finnish subsidiary, Orth-Export and Kallonen's company called Ruisku-Muovi started to make subcontracting for it. Orth-Export ended up on the verge of bankruptcy and, in 1956, was acquired by the Kallonen family. This gave the family access to plenty of valuable moulds for their own plastic machine. An abbreviation of the company’s name, Orthex, was printed on Orth-Export’s plastic moulds. This name ended up becoming the name of the Kallonen family’s company. In 1958 Kallonen's company moved from Helsinki to Lohja.

Initially, Kallonen's company was a subcontractor to the Danish company and used mostly molds it has purchased elsewhere. In the 1960s, the company began manufacturing plastic buckets and wash bowls. There was a huge shift from zinc buckets to plastic buckets in Finland and Orthex sold one million buckets a year. Kallonen purchased new plastic machines and expanded the factory around his home in Lohja several times.

In the mid-1960s, architect Väinö A. Valve worked as Orthex's designer.

=== 1980-2008 ===
In the early 1980s, Orthex decided to focus on household goods, and hired Laura Huhtela-Bremer to design for them.

Aulis Kallonen worked as the CEO of the company until 1995, after which he became the chairman of the board while his son Kari Kallonen started as the new CEO.

In 1999, Orthex had a turnover of FIM 60 million and it employed 91 people. In 2000, the company had 200 products with 1760 different sales items.

=== 2009-2014 Orthex and Intera Partners ===
In the spring 2009 Kari Kallonen and his wife Tiina Kallonen sold the majority of the company to a Finnish investment company, Intera Partners, after which the company began to grow rapidly through acquisitions. In 2010, it acquired the Swedish kitchenware maker Sveico, which doubled the company's turnover. Sveico made metallic and plastic kitchen utensils like ladles and whisks. Kari Kallonen's successor as CEO was Alexander Rosenlew, who had led Colgate-Palmolive in Finland. Orthex molded more than ten million individual plastic household items a year.

In 2011, Orthex acquired Swedish Hammarplast Consumer AB and got access to its brands Hammarplast, Sarvis and SmartStore. Orthex's turnover was more than doubled by the acquisition and it employed now about 300 people in Scandinavia. Orthex opened its first store in Lohja. Its turnover was about 60 million euros.

=== 2015- Orthex and Sponsor Capital ===
In 2015, Orthex was acquired by Sponsor Capital, a Finnish venture capital firm, and Orthex's executive management team. Rosenlew continued in his CEO position. The reason for the acquisition was that Orthex wanted to concentrate on the internationalization with help of the experience got from Sponsor Capital. Orthex was then exporting its products to 40 countries.

In 2016 and 2017, sales organisations were set up in Germany, France and the UK.

In 2018, Orthex and Stora Enso announced that they had developed a food-grade biocomposite. Biocomposite kitchenware first started to be sold in S Group’s stores, after which distribution was expanded.

Orthex was listed on the Nasdaq Helsinki in March 2021. The issue was oversubscribed many times over. The company’s anchor investors included Conficap, Ilmarinen and Thomasset.

== Organization ==
Orthex has factories in Sweden (Gnosjö and Tingsryd) and in Finland in Lohja.

The Orthex group consists of:

- Oy Orthex Finland Ab,
- Orthex Sweden AB,
- Orthex Kitchen AB,
- Orthex Norway AS,
- Orthex Denmark A/S,
- Orthex Germany GmbH,
- Orthex France SARL and
- GastroMax Limited

Orthex has two factory outlets, one in Lohja and the other one in Tingsryd.

In 2021, the company had around 300 employees, of which 70 worked at the Lohja factory. Its three factories were automated to a great degree. The company had seven sales offices in Europe: in Denmark, Finland, France, Germany, Norway, Sweden and the UK. It also had a warehouse in Germany.

In November 2021 the biggest owners were Conficap, Sponsor Fund and Alexander Rosenlew.

== Markets and products ==
In 2020, Orthex’s products were sold in about 40 countries. The company’s turnover was 76 million euros, and about 80% of it came from the Nordic countries, where the company was also the market leader. In Central Europe, its products were sold by retail chains such as Carrefour, Metro and Bauhaus.

In 2020, Orthex’s product range included about 1,000 different plastic products. The company’s products have been divided into four product groups:

- The Home & Yard products include buckets and mailboxes sold under the Orthex brand.
- The Plant Care products include flowerpots and watering cans.
- The Storage product group includes SmartStore storage boxes and containers.
- The Kitchen product group includes SmartStore products.

In 2020, more than 60% of the company’s turnover came from storage boxes and containers and about 24% came from GastroMax kitchen products.

Orthex has manufactured some of the very common items in Finnish homes. In example over 8 of 10 households owned the Orthex freezer box Jäänalle and the 10 liter bucket according to a survey conducted by Ilta-Sanomat in 2019. Orthex's classic sled was described as the most common kids sled over the years by Helsingin Sanomat in 2005.

=== Jäänalle freezer box ===
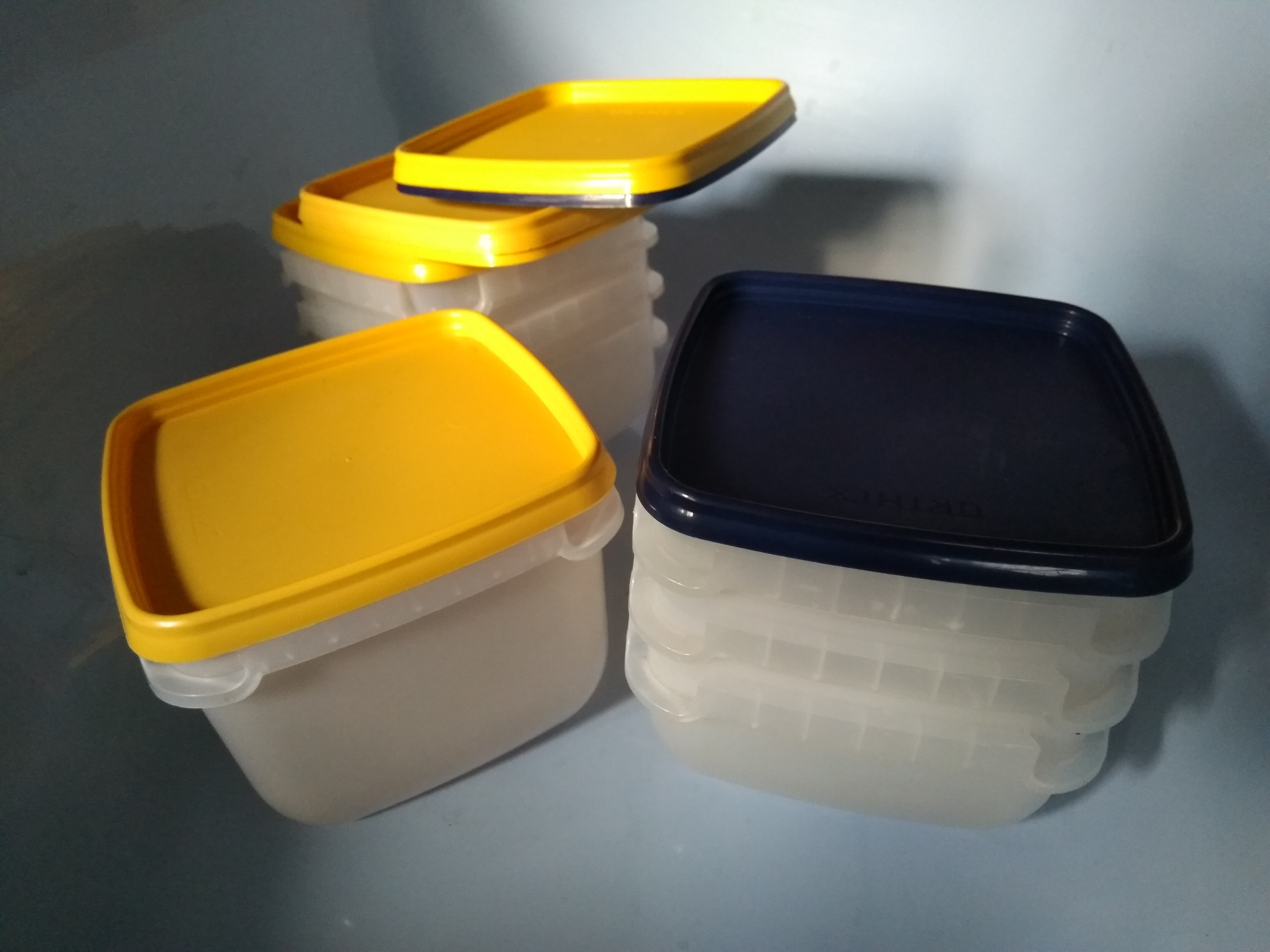
Orthex Jäänalle freezer boxes designed by Laura Huhtela-Bremer in 1995.

Orthex freezer box called Jäänalle was introduced in 1995, after which it has been sold 60 to 70 million units (by 2019). The box is made from granular polypropylene and lids are made of linear low-density polyethylene. The box was created to meet the price competition started by Orthex's competitor, Sarvis. Box was designed by Huhtela-Bremer. The box was designed so that they left empty space in the freezer to allow cold air to flow. The box featured rounded corners which allowed the content to freeze more evenly. Rounded corners also made it easier to spoon the contents from the box. The material was chosen so that hot liquid could be poured into it. Simple but practical improvements to the box made it a hit in Finland. The boxes are mostly sold in the late summer. Their demand follows the berry and mushroom crops. The most popular container size is 0.5 liters, accounting for almost half of the sales. In spring 2019, it was told that the freezer boxes will be changing from Orthex to the internationally more known Gastromax brand.

== Bio and recycled plastics ==
Orthex has been manufacturing products from recycled plastic since the late 2000s. In 2019, bio- and recycled plastics accounted for 14% of the raw material used by Orthex. Orthex makes all of its flower pots and window boxes entirely from recycled plastic. Recycled material is used in storage boxes and sleds, but due to regulations, recycled plastic cannot be used in products that are in contact with food. In January 2021, about 30% of the products manufactured at the Lohja factory were made of recycled or bio-based materials.

=== 2018 Biocomposites ===
In 2018 Orthex and Stora Enso released a new biocomposite material. Biocomposite is made from wood fibers and saccharum officinarum. Products contain 98% of biomaterials. The portion of wood fiber in the products varies between 30-50%, depending on the end product. For example, cutting boards contain about one-third of the wood fiber, 63% of the sugar-cane-based polyethylene while the rest is additives. Biocomposite is utilized in a range of kitchen products manufactured by Orthex, which include e.g. cutting boards and kitchen utensils with handles made of this biocomposite. The raw material for the new material is from Stora Enso's factory in Hylte in Sweden, it's a by-product of the pulp and wood products industry. The material is slightly harder than traditional plastic, dishwasher safe and can be recycled. The bio-composite products are sold e.g. by S Group, Kesko, ICA and Bergendahls.

== Corporate social responsibility ==
Orthex’s goal is to make its production carbon neutral by 2030. The company is seeking to do this by, for example, using renewable energy, using recycled and bio-based materials in its products and reducing waste in the production process.

== Recognitions ==
- In 2006 Orthex won the National Entrepreneurial Prize in Finland.
- In 2012, Orthex's new Piece of Eden pots won the ”Red Dot: product design 2012” award.
