= Dorothy Jones =

Dorothy Jones may refer to:

- Dori Jones Yang, birth name Dorothy E. Jones (born 1954), American expert on China
- Dorothy Janis, stage name of Dorothy Penelope Jones (1912–2010), American actress
- Dorothy Jones (died 2010), American R&B singer in The Cookies
- Dorothy Jones (diec c. 1678), early settler in New England, married Richard Sears (pilgrim)
- Dorothy Jones, American founder of Jones' Fantastic Museum
- Dorothy J. Heydt (fl. 1969), American science fiction and fantasy author
- Dorothy Swanda Jones (1929–1993), American politician
- Dot-Marie Jones, full name Dorothy-Marie Jones (born 1964), American actress and athlete
- Nida Blanca, stage name of Dorothy Guinto Jones (1936–2001), Filipina actress
