= Jim Donald (businessman) =

American businessman

- Born: James Donald
- Known for: Former CEO of Starbucks
- Title: Chairman, Albertsons
- Term: 2018–present
- Predecessor: Orin C. Smith
- Successor: Howard Schultz

James Donald is an American businessman who was the chief executive officer (CEO) of Starbucks from 2005 to 2008. He was preceded by Orin C. Smith, who led the company since 2000, and was succeeded by the coffeehouse's second president, Howard Schultz. Donald also held various executive positions with Albertsons.

== Early life and education ==
Donald grew up in Florida and started working as a grocery bagger in Tampa when he was 16. Donald graduated with a bachelor's degree in Business Administration from American Century University in Albuquerque, New Mexico. From 1976 to 1991, he held several managerial positions with Albertsons. While working at Albertsons, Donald pursued his undergraduate degree. It took 15 years for Donald to finish his degree because he was constantly moved to revamp distressed stores for Albertsons.

== Career ==
In 1991, he was recruited by Sam Walton to join Walmart to lead the development of its grocery business and Superstore concept. Walmart was experimenting with selling groceries at six stores but hadn't figured out how to expand the concept. Donald revamped the company's dysfunctional distribution center, which hadn't been designed for grocery storage. By the time he left three years later, Walmart had added grocery sales in 140 more stores. Donald left Walmart for Safeway in 1994, as senior vice president of its 130-store eastern division until 1996. At Safeway Donald was responsible for a $2.5 billion business with more than 10,000 employees. He succeeded in reversing Safeway's four-year trend of declining same-store sales. Donald's first CEO role was at Pathmark Stores from 1996 to 2002. He took over Pathmark while the store chain was struggling with debt. Donald filed for a prepackaged Chapter 11 bankruptcy after a deal to sell the company failed. This strategy allowed him to "slough off debt and reemerge with a public company," according to an article published by Forbes.

Donald joined Starbucks in 2002 as president of the North American division. Donald replaced Orin C. Smith as CEO on April 1, 2005. In January 2008, Donald was replaced by Howard Schultz. During his tenure, Starbucks enjoyed record growth, including five straight years of 20%+ annual earnings increases. In 2009, in an effort to reverse its ailing fortunes, Haggen Food & Pharmacy named Donald president and CEO. Within two years Haggen was sold to Comvest Group. The new owners replaced Donald as CEO.

In February 2012, Donald was named CEO of Extended Stay Hotels by Blackstone Group LP (BX), Centerbridge Partners LP and Paulson & Co., investment companies which had bought the hotel chain out of bankruptcy. Less than a year later, the company was transformed from an organization that was weeks away from running out of cash into the business that was named America's Most Improved hotel brand. Donald left Extended Stay in December, 2015. Investors Blackstone, Centerbridge, and Paulson were able to almost triple their investment when Extended Stay America Inc. went public in 2013. He was CEO of Extended Stay America from 2012 to 2015 Donald's first stint with Albertsons was from 1976 until 1991. During that time he was head of operations in Phoenix, Arizona. After 27 years Donald returned to Albertsons on March 5, 2018 as president and COO.

== See also ==
- History of Starbucks
