= Orin C. Smith =

American businessman (1942–2018)

- Born: June 26, 1942; Ryderwood, Washington, U.S.
- Died: March 1, 2018 (aged 75); Palm Desert, California, U.S.
- Education: University of Washington; Harvard University
- Occupation: Businessman
- Predecessor: Howard Schultz
- Successor: Jim Donald

Orin C. Smith (June 26, 1942 – March 1, 2018) was an American businessman who was president and chief executive officer (CEO) of Starbucks Corporation from 2000 to 2005. He joined Starbucks as vice president and chief financial officer in 1990, becoming president and chief operating officer in 1994, and a director of Starbucks in 1996. He was preceded by Howard Schultz and succeeded by Jim Donald who was himself succeeded by Schultz.

== Biography ==
Prior to joining Starbucks, Smith spent much of his career in management consulting with Deloitte & Touche. Later he became the Chief Budget Officer for two Governors: Dixy Lee Ray and Booth Gardner, followed by CFO of two international transportation companies.

With Smith onboard first as CFO then COO and finally CEO, Starbucks expanded to more than 10,000 locations worldwide and more than $5 billion in sales. Smith led Starbucks to link coffee production to the protection of rain forests. Smith retired from Starbucks in 2005 and later became a director of Nike, Inc. and The Walt Disney Company. He was elected independent lead director of The Walt Disney Company on March 13, 2012. He was chair of the Starbucks Foundation, vice chair of the University of Washington Board of Regents and member of the Conservation International board of directors.

Smith graduated from the University of Washington in 1965 and the Harvard Business School in 1967. Smith was the recipient of many honors and awards, including the highest honor given to graduates of the Harvard Business School and one of Business Week's best managers in 2004.

== Personal life ==
Smith was a resident of Jackson, Wyoming. He was born in Ryderwood, Washington, a logging camp. Soon after he was born, the family moved to Chehalis, Washington. He graduated from W. F. West High School in Chehalis where he grew up. He was a member of the 1960 high school basketball team, the Bearcats, which won the state Class A basketball championship.

Smith died of pancreatic cancer at his home in Palm Desert, California, at the age of 75.

== Philanthropy ==
Smith had a long history of contributing funding to the city of Chehalis, particularly its schools as well as towards preservation of the city's buildings, parks, and history. He donated $10 million to the Chehalis School District to help create a perpetual Student Achievement Initiative (SAI) fund to be used for high school graduates of his alma mater to enroll in higher education and obtain professional careers after graduation.

For his "exceptional contribution" to the mission and vision of Chehalis schools, Orin C. Smith Elementary School was named in Smith's honor and opened for third, fourth and fifth grade in 2019 on the same campus as the James W. Lintott Elementary School, which opened for kindergarten, first and second grade in 2018.

The local Vernetta Smith branch library in Chehalis, part of the Timberland Regional Library system, was built in part due to funding by Orin Smith and the building bears his mother's name.

Via the Orin Smith Family Foundation, additional donations include a $30,000 gift in 2018 to help fund the creation of a statue of Centralia, Washington founders, George and Mary Jane Washington, at George Washington Park.
