= Coffee wars =

Competition between coffee businesses for market share

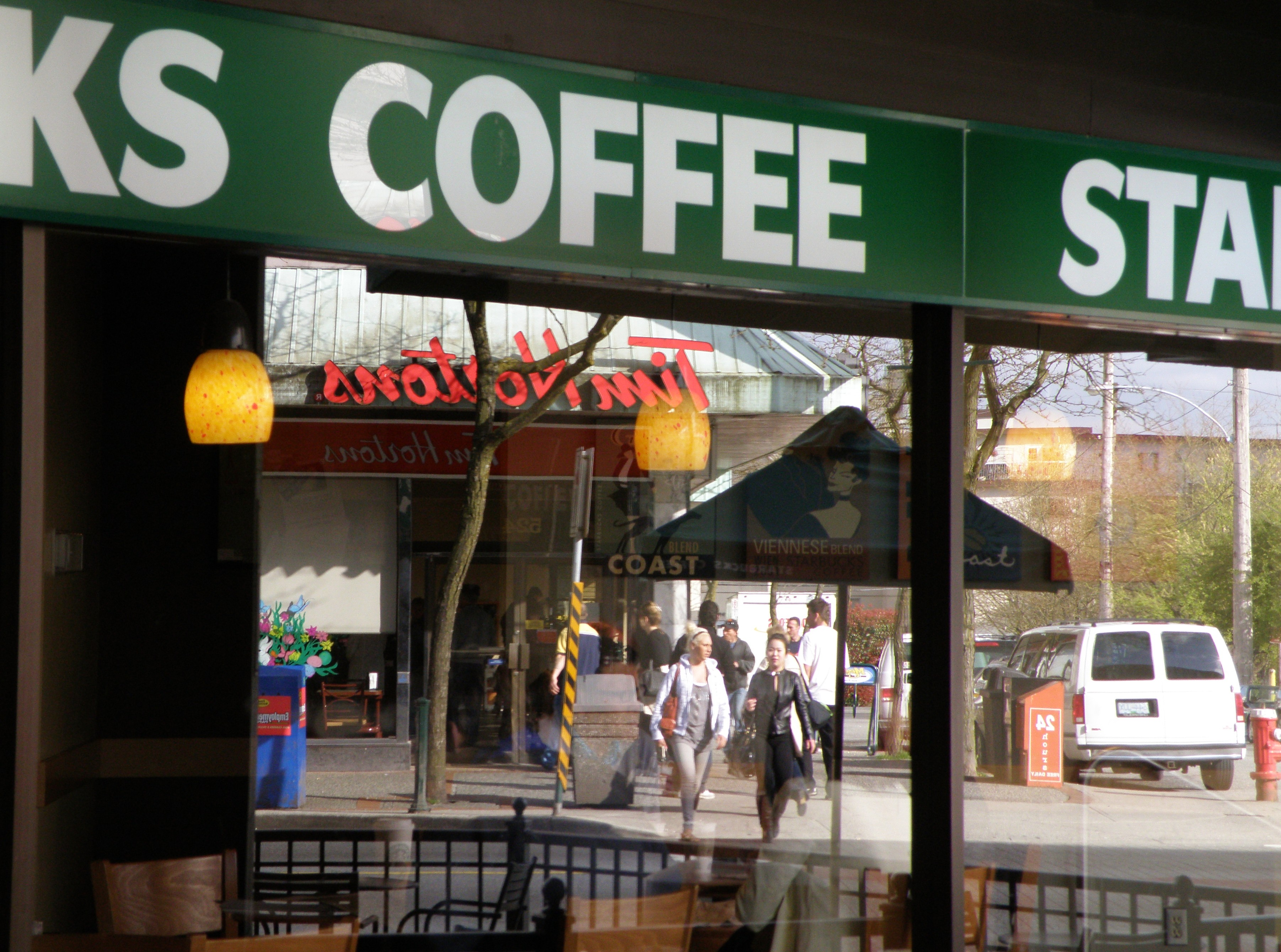
Most coffee wars for consumer market share involve the largest coffeehouse, Starbucks, pictured here reflecting a sign for Tim Hortons in New Westminster, Canada.

Coffee wars, sometimes referred to as caffeine wars, involve a variety of sales and marketing tactics by coffeehouse chains and espresso machine manufacturers to increase brand and consumer market share. In North America belligerents in these wars typically include large coffeehouses, such as Starbucks, Dunkin', McDonald's, and Tim Hortons. According to The Economist, the largest coffee war of the late 2000s was between Starbucks and McDonald's in the United States. The U.S. market has, since the early 2010s, been primarily contested by its two largest players, Starbucks and Dunkin'. Since 2020, competition over the Chinese coffee market has intensified between Starbucks and Luckin Coffee.

Periods of low economic activity and business recessions––which contribute to diminished consumer demand––have been linked to an increase in coffee wars. Major innovations in the coffee industry, particularly the advent of single-serve espresso pods, have lowered the market's barrier to entry. Although store count has been traditionally seen as gauging market share, both firms and analysts have incorporated revenue, balance sheets, organic growth, operating margin, and stock market performance as comparable indicators.

== Asia ==
=== China ===
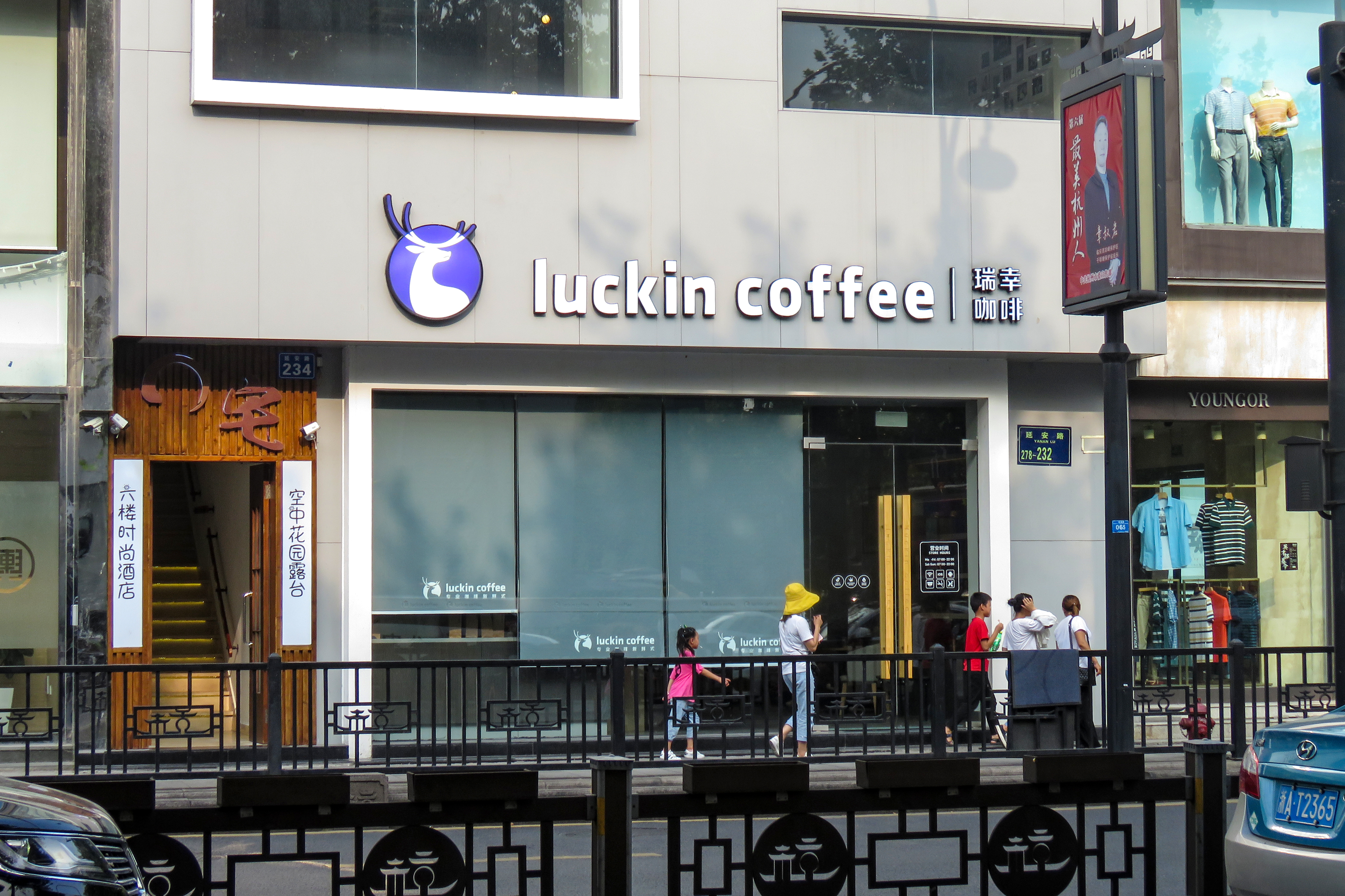
Since 2020, Luckin Coffee has been China's largest coffee chain by store count.

From the early 1990s to the late 2010s, Starbucks was the largest coffeehouse in China. However, since 2017, competition over the Chinese coffee market has intensified between Starbucks and Luckin Coffee.

In August 2018, Luckin signed a distribution deal with e-commerce group Alibaba to increase their online retail presence in China. The 2018 trade war between the U.S. and China, with the two companies serving as their respective proxies, also led to a resurgence of Luckin Coffee in China.

In January 2020, Luckin Coffee had more stores than Starbucks in China, with Luckin having 4,500 stores compared to Starbucks' 4,200. However, the Chinese firm's entry into the U.S. capital markets faltered in early April 2020 after reports surfaced of fraudulent accounting and inflating market share projections. Luckin Coffee's stock was halted on the U.S. stock market after a corporate fraud investigation was initiated by U.S. and Chinese authorities. Chinese consumers were boosting Luckin Coffee's market share as a rejection of American-led companies, specifically Starbucks. The Chinese government cautioned domestic investors from doing this soon-after, writing: "Luckin's actions harm the reputation of Chinese companies overseas." Fearing a possible bankruptcy, Luckin Coffee customers flooded their online app with orders redeeming free drink vouchers leading to a temporary rise in market share.

Luckin has since rebounded in what has been dubbed “a miracle in China's business history” and is, as of 2024, the dominant coffeehouse in China with 16,218 stores to Starbucks' 6,975.

=== Taiwan ===
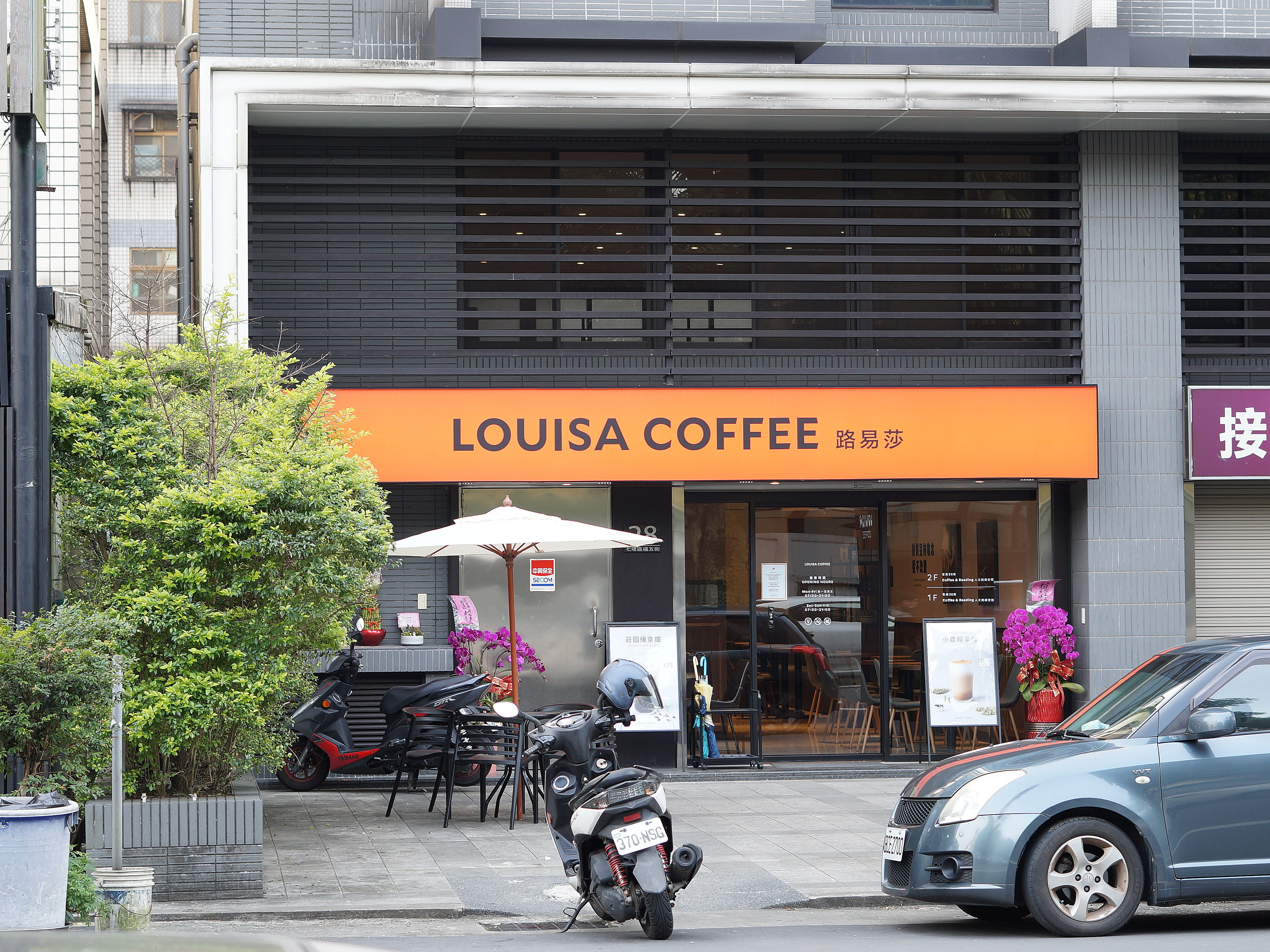
Since 2019, Louisa Coffee is Taiwan's largest coffee chain by number of locations.

Several popular Taiwanese coffee chains are in Taiwan, including 85C Bakery Cafe and Louisa Coffee. In December 2019, Louisa Coffee became the chain with the most locations in Taiwan.

== Europe ==
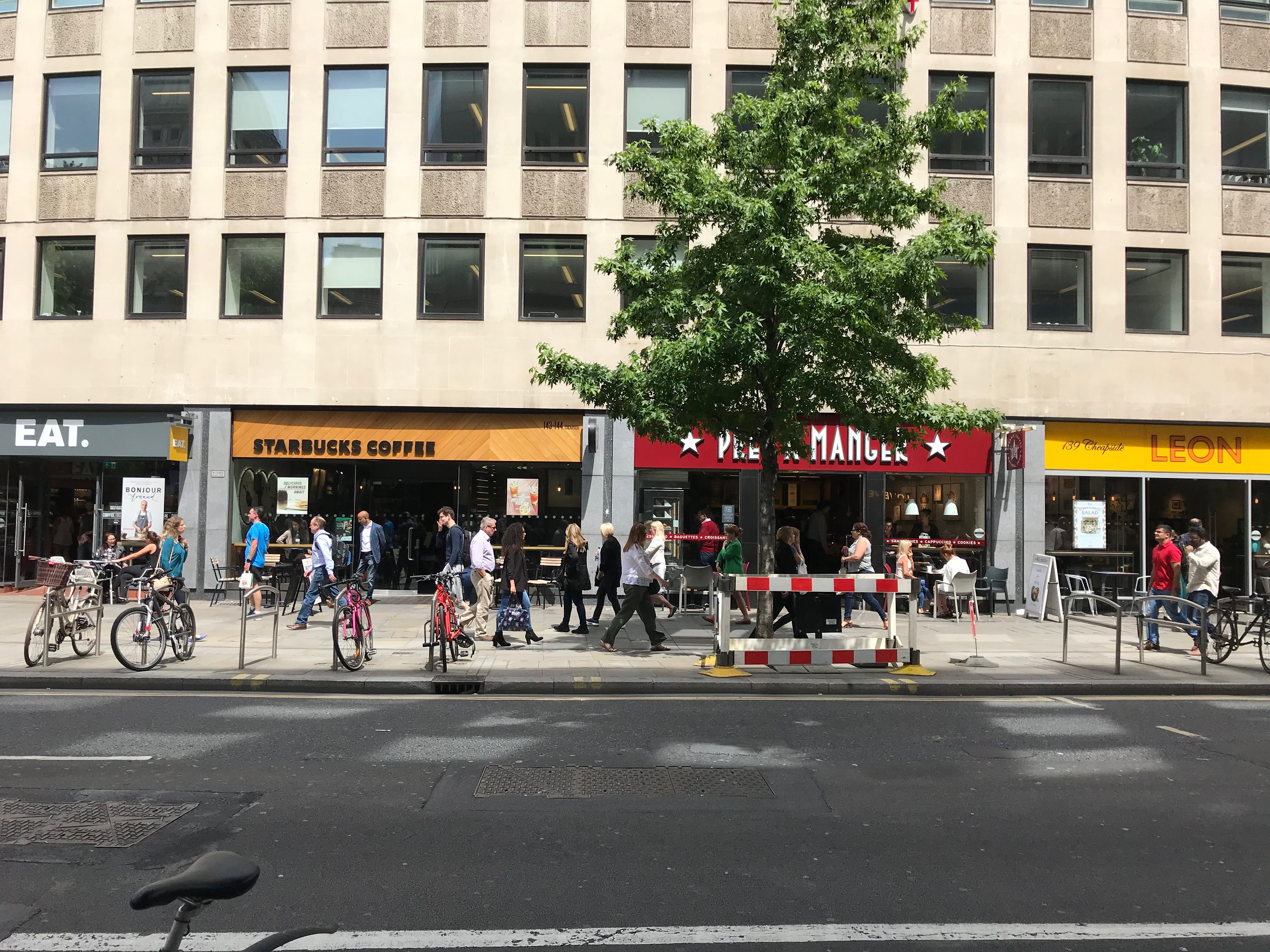
Rival outlets on Cheapside in London, England

The coffee wars in North America have promoted a rise in mergers and acquisitions in the European coffee market to better compete in coffee wars. In October 2018, the Italian coffee proprietor Illy merged with the German JAB Holding Company to reconfigure its market share. The two companies announced that they will be producing espresso pods, to compete with Nestlé's Nespresso brand. European, and particularly Italian, brands struggle to compete in U.S.-based coffee wars due to their cultural rejection of third-wave coffee culture. However, their Italian identity is "a big advantage over the multinationals" with respect to espresso. The 2018 entrance of Starbucks and Nestlé into the Italian coffee market had Lavazza and Illy increase their merger and acquisition (M&A) activity. In October 2018 Lavazza acquired Mars Inc.’s coffee business for $650 million while Illy signed a distribution deal with JAB. The Wall Street Journal reported that the European coffee market was worth $83 billion in 2018, estimating a 16 percent increase in 2019. The vice chairman of Lavazza, Giuseppe Lavazza, conceded in 2018 that Starbucks was competitive in the Italian market.

== North America ==
=== Canada ===
Several coffee chains operate in Canada, including Blenz Coffee, Coffee Time, Country Style, Second Cup, Starbucks, McDonald's Canada, Tim Hortons, and Timothy's World Coffee.

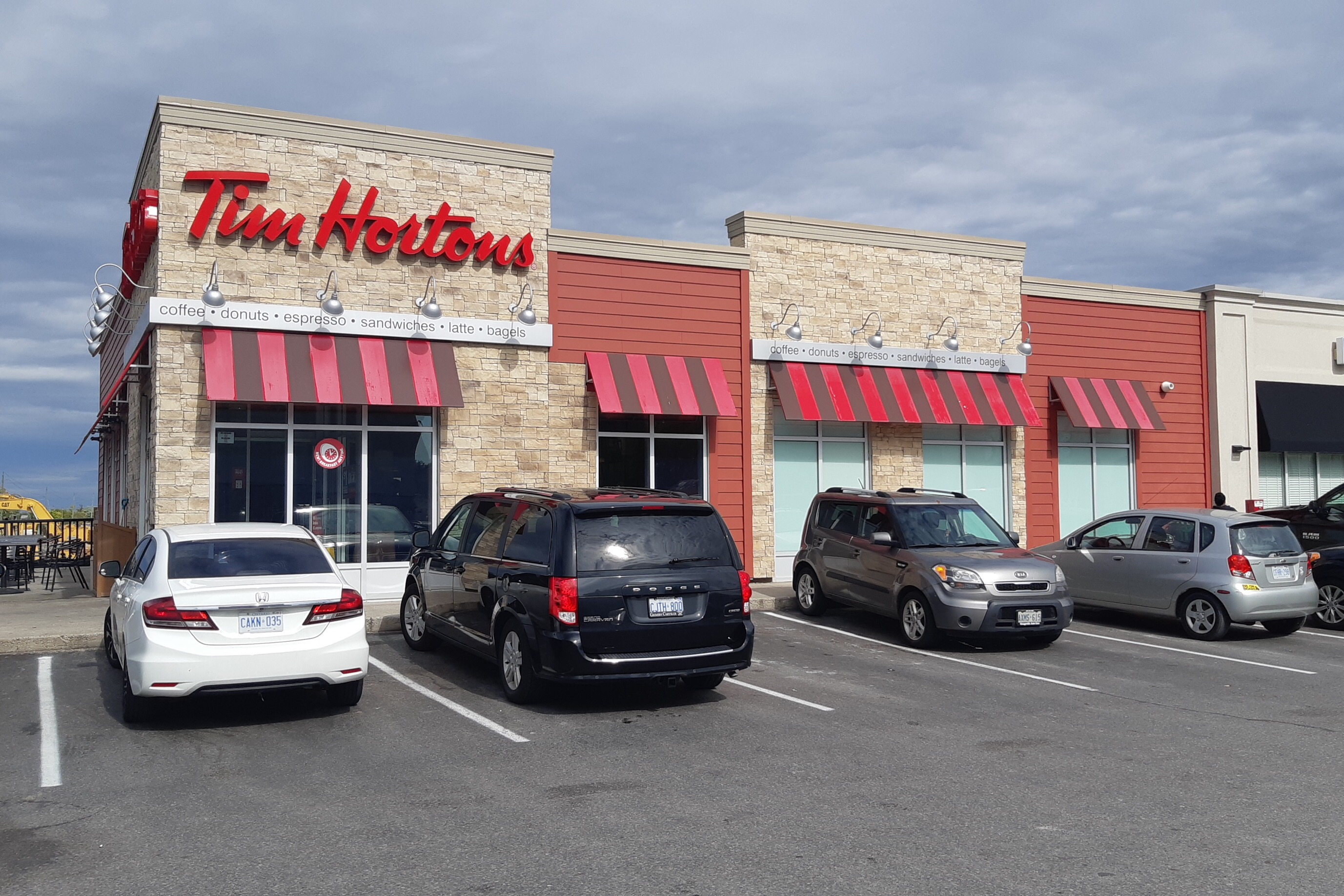
A Tim Hortons store in Shelburne, Ontario. Tim Hortons is Canada's largest coffee chain by number of locations.

A "coffee war" began in Canada in the late-2000s after Starbucks made an effort to attract the Canadian breakfast market, markets traditionally dominated by Tim Hortons and McDonald's. During the 2010s, coffee chains offered several specials and promotions in an attempt to attract market shares from the competition. McDonald's began to compete directly with Tim Hortons' annual "Roll Up the Rim" contest, by introducing a semi-annual promotion of a free small coffee in 2010. In a 2011 report released by the NPD Group, the 3,295 Tim Hortons locations accounted for 26 percent of all restaurant traffic in Canada, whereas McDonald's' 1,400 locations accounted for 10 percent, and Starbucks locations accounted for 1.3 percent. In 2011, Tim Hortons accounted for 76 percent of the baked food and coffee market in the country; with eight out of 10 cups of coffee sold at "quick-service restaurants" in Canada were from Tim Hortons. Tim Hortons sold over 2.1 billion cups of coffee that year; Conversely, McDonald's sold 200 million cups of coffee that year.

As of December 31, 2016, Tim Hortons remained the largest coffee chain by number of locations available in Canada, with 4,613 stores. McDonald's, and Starbucks both operate over 1,400 stores in Canada. In 2014, Canada has more Starbucks per capita than any other country in the world, with 39.54 Starbucks stores for every million residents in Canada. In an effort to gain further market share in the Canadian coffee market, McDonald's began opening standalone McCafés in Canada in 2015. McDonald's tripled its sales of brewed coffee in Canada from the 1970s to 2018, doubling its market share to 13 percent. However, the same period also saw Dunkin' Donuts withdraw from the Canadian market, with the company closing its last three Canadian locations in September 2018. Dunkin Donuts' decline in Canada has largely been attributed to its direct competition with Tim Hortons.

In addition to coffee, several of these fast food retailers, including Country Style, McDonald's, Starbucks, and Tim Hortons also compete for the country's fast food breakfast market, referred to as the "breakfast wars".

=== United States ===
According to The Economist, the largest coffee war of the late 2000s has been between Starbucks and McDonald's in the United States. This dynamic between the two coffeehouses was shared by the Financial Times. During the 2008 financial crisis, Starbucks' market share tapered after consumer spending dropped. McDonald's launched a marketing blitz to capitalize on this from 2008 to 2009. In December 2008, McDonald's erected a billboard that read "four bucks is dumb" a play on words for "Starbucks is dumb" for selling coffee at higher price points than McDonald's. Another billboard read "large is the new grande", a jab at the social and cultural perceptions of Starbucks. However Starbucks chief executive Howard Schultz, a major proponent of coffee wars, voiced his concern about market saturation and vocally opposed the comparison between the McCafé and his firm's products. "We are up for the defense and we are going to get on the offense", Schultz told investors in late 2008. John Moore, the firm's marketing head, denounced McDonald's as "selling hot, brown liquid masquerading as coffee" in 2003, in reference to recent market gains. In line with this the spread of instant coffee has also intensified competition in the packaged coffee markets, particularly at lower price points. In 2009, McDonald's was seen to formally "kick off the coffee war" with Starbucks, particularly by offering specialty espresso drinks. However, coffee accounted for 6 percent of domestic sales for McDonald's during this time. The Wall Street Journal reported in 2011 that the closer price points were for coffee the more competitive coffeehouses were with each other, despite different demographic markets.

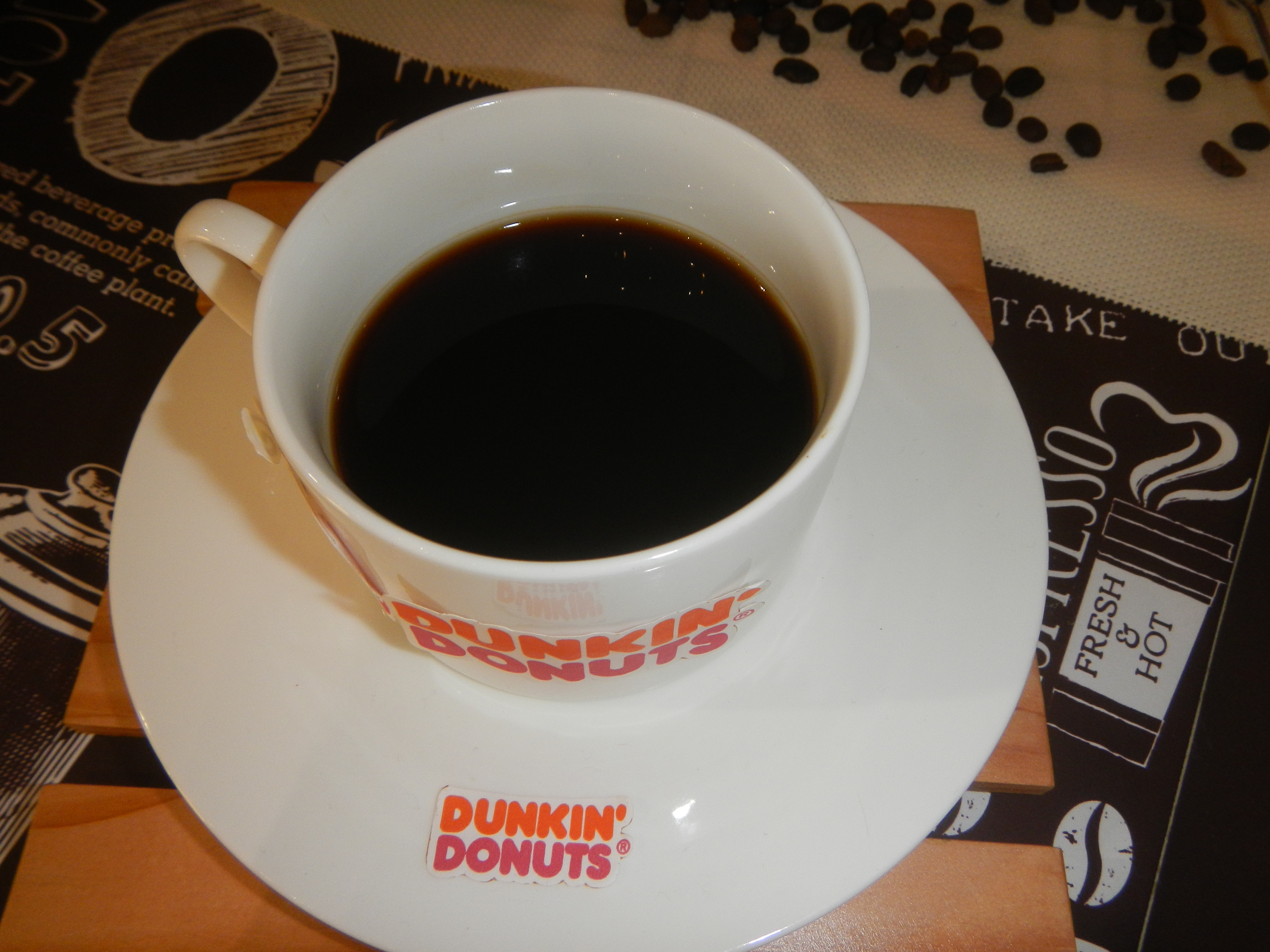
A cup of Dunkin' coffee, 2017

The U.S. coffee market has since the early 2010s been primarily contested by its two largest players, Starbucks and Dunkin', which make up most of the country's commercial coffee shops. In 2014 The Guardian reported that "There is a war going on in America, and the battleground is coffee." In July 2011 Dunkin' Donuts went public on the U.S. stock market, raising $427.5 million to "heat up the fast-food java battle." In 2011 Dunkin' Donuts controlled more than half of the New England coffee market. Around 60 percent of the company's domestic sales were attributable to coffee and beverages. In 2016, Dunkin' Donuts revamped its iced coffee offering, a departure from its portfolio of warm drip coffee and basic espresso-based drinks. Two years later, in 2019, the donut company dropped "donuts" from its name to better compete in the beverage industry. In September 2019, Dunkin' committed $100 million to position itself against Starbucks and McDonald's, calling the former coffeeshop its "arch enemy". By June, both companies registered record, yet comparable stock market growth, Dunkin' rising by 24 percent, Starbucks by 29 percent. A 2017 CNN analysis found that Dunkin' was "particularly aggressive in the coffee wars." During that year's Starbucks annual meeting Schultz responded to Dunkin' market gains by telling shareholders to metaphorically bring the "sabers out." Tim Hortons, a Canadian chain which historically had only a limited presence in the U.S. (primarily in Western New York), made a major expansion into the U.S. in the early part of the 21st century, culminating in its corporate merger with established U.S. fast food chain Burger King in 2014.

In 2013, The Motley Fool speculated that the spread of Starbucks' gift cards and national loyalty program was a primary driver in coffee-driven market gains. A year later, McDonald's conceded that Starbucks was "winning the coffee wars" by cornering the caffe latte market. Competing firms have retooled their market expansion by spinning off divisions to finance store openings. In 2018 Starbucks sold its packaged coffee business to Nestlé in order to free up $7.2 billion for its stores. In an effort to undercut its competition, Starbucks released its signature Pumpkin Spice Latte in August 2019 – instead of its typical Autumn release. In March 2020, Panera Bread launched a coffee subscription service to compete directly with Starbucks' national loyalty program. The COVID-19 pandemic led to severe backsliding in market share for the largest coffeeshops, with smaller cafés closing permanently due to lack of demand. Most of the major players initiated distribution deals with delivery platforms during the pandemic to sustain growth: Uber Eats (Starbucks), GrubHub (Dunkin'), and DoorDash (McDonald's).

In 2023 McDonald's opened a trial of a few CosMc's cafes, selling afternoon snacks, drinks and coffee. This was seen as an attempt by McDonald's to reposition itself in the United States coffee market.

== Espresso machine market ==
Along with the competition between coffeehouses, the manufacturers of espresso machines have also competed to enlarge their respective shares. Typically coming in three styles, manual (pulls), automatic (pulls and serves), and super-automatic (grinds, pulls, and serves), the advent of espresso pods, have lowered the market's barrier to entry. In 2010, Nespresso launched a home-brew method of pulling espresso shots by inventing a compact single-use coffee container. Typically contrasted with the more traditional ground coffee served by most major coffee shops, the use of espresso pods have proliferated. In March 2014 Nespresso's patent expired, allowing Keurig and Green Mountain Coffee to market their own brands. In 2018, Keurig Green Mountain merged with Dr Pepper to create Keurig Dr Pepper. In March 2016, Starbucks announced a partnership with Keurig to distribute Starbucks-branded pods in their brewers officially entering the market. In April 2019 Starbucks launched a large suite of espresso pods, featuring all of their branded-espresso, with Nestlé. This linked the world largest coffeehouse with the largest pod-manufacturer. Since then, many companies (including Italian manufactures Lavazza and Illy) have launched their own brands.

== See also ==
- Burger wars
- Chicken sandwich wars
- Cola wars
- Economics of coffee
- Food trends
- List of coffeehouse chains
- List of countries by coffee production
