= Dori Jones Yang =

American novelist

Dori Jones Yang is an American author and journalist specializing in topics related to China.

== Works ==
Dori Jones Yang's most widely read book is Pour Your Heart Into It: How Starbucks Built a Company One Cup at a Time (1997), co-authored with Howard Schultz, chairman and CEO of Starbucks. The book was translated into ten languages and reached several bestseller lists.

In 2000, she wrote a book for children called The Secret Voice of Gina Zhang, which won the Pleasant T. Rowland Prize for Fiction for Girls and the Skipping Stones Honor Award for multicultural and international books in 2001.

Her historical novel, Daughter of Xanadu, was published by Random House/Delacorte Press in January 2011. Is set in the time of Marco Polo and Khubilai Khan.

Her second children's book, The Forbidden Temptation of Baseball, won the 2017 Freeman Book Award for books about Asia in the young adult/high school literature category. It also won five other awards.

Her 2020 memoir, When the Red Gates Opened: A Memoir of China's Reawakening, documents her eight years as a Business Week correspondent covering China from 1982 to 1990.

== Biography ==
Born in 1954 as Dorothy E. Jones in Youngstown, Ohio, Yang studied at Hathaway Brown School in Cleveland, earned a bachelor's degree in European history at Princeton University and earned a master's degree in international relations from Johns Hopkins University. She studied Mandarin Chinese and taught English in Singapore on a Princeton-in-Asia fellowship. She traveled extensively throughout East and Southeast Asia, as well as Nepal, India, Pakistan, Afghanistan, and Iran.

Yang trained in journalism at the Youngstown Vindicator, National Observer, The Daily Princetonian, and China Business Review. She joined Business Week in 1981 and worked there for fifteen years, as an international business editor in New York, bureau manager in Hong Kong (1982–1990) and bureau manager in Seattle (1990–1995). She covered the Tiananmen Square protests in Beijing in June 1989.

After marrying Paul Yang in 1985, she began writing under the byline of Dori Jones Yang. She worked as West Coast business and technology correspondent for U.S. News & World Report from 1999 to 2001.
