= Coffee production in China =

Modern cultivation of coffee in China began in 1988. In 2016 and 2017, China was among the top 20 worldwide producers of coffee. Ninety-eight per cent of the coffee grown in China comes from Yunnan province.

== History ==
A French missionary brought coffee to Yunnan province in the late 19th century, marking the crop's introduction to China. However, the modern Chinese coffee cultivation industry began in 1988 when the Chinese government, The World Bank and the United Nations Development Programme jointly initiated a program to introduce coffee growing in the region. Nestlé also arrived early in Yunnan to encourage the cultivation of coffee. Hogood Coffee, the largest domestic instant coffee maker, was founded in 2007 and has been responsible for cultivating much of the coffee in the Dehong region. Hogood capitalizes on relaxed land use policies in Yunnan which have allowed farmland consolidation through contract farming schemes; seedlings are planted by Hogood and harvested by farmers of the beans that are at the end purchased by Hogood. In 2013, Yunnan Coffee Traders became the region's first dedicated specialty coffee exporter; they are now (2018) the largest exporter of Yunnan speciality coffee in China.

Domestic coffee consumption in China rose in parallel with an increase in domestic coffee production; from 2006 to 2017, Chinese coffee consumption had grown by an annual average of 22%.

White-collar workers are the main force behind coffee consumption. In a survey, white-collar workers accounted for 30% of the total, which is the largest consumer group, followed by government officials, school staff and, people who work for organizations, accounting for 15%. The proportion of freelancers and coffee practitioners is close to that of public institutions.

== Planting and varieties ==
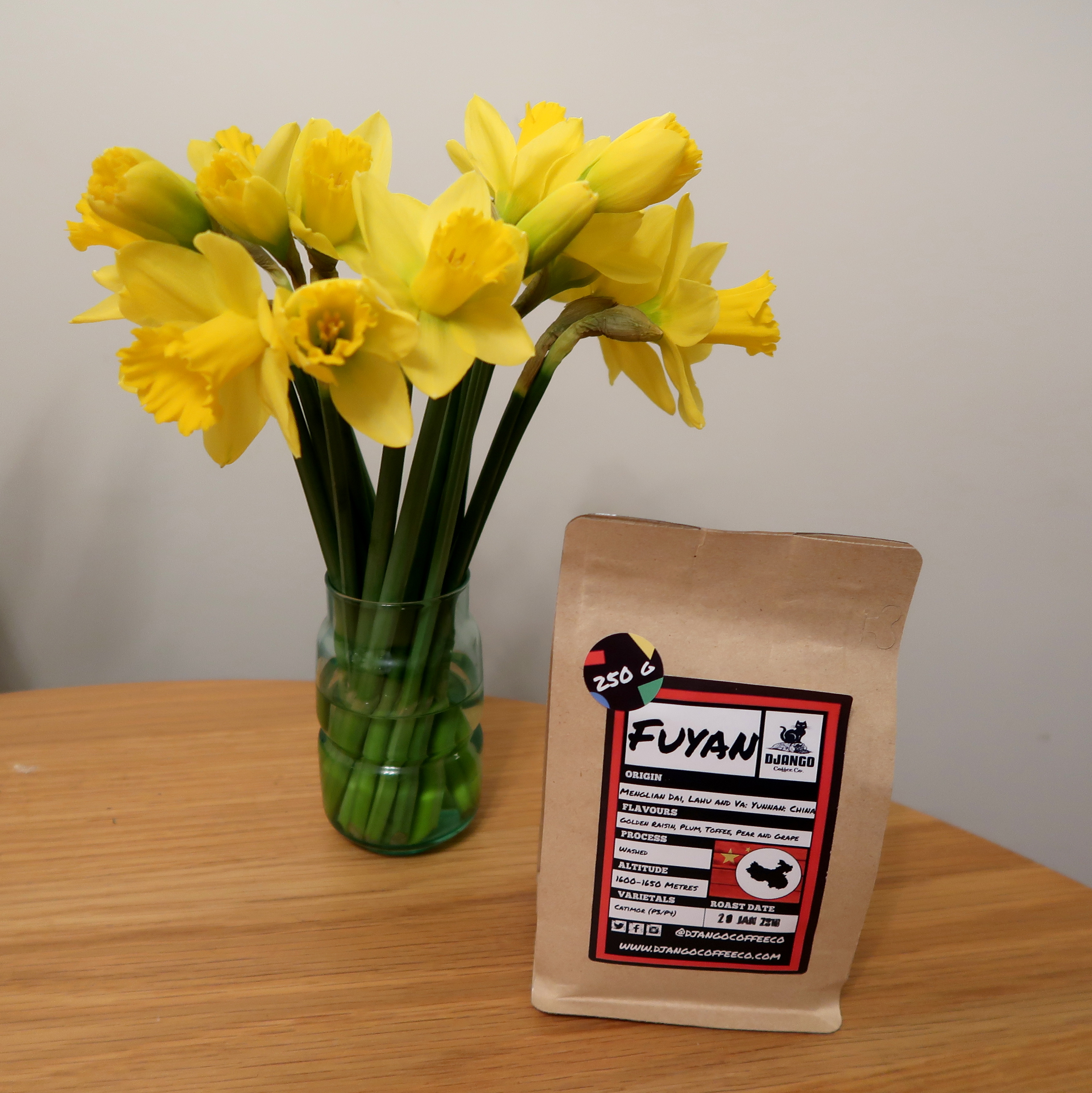
Coffee from Yunnan province, Menglian Region (Fuyan Farm) exported by Yunnan Coffee Traders and Roasted by Django.

Almost all domestic coffee comes from Yunnan, accounting for 98% of production. The main regions within Yunnan for coffee production are Baoshan, Dehong, and Menglian in Pu'er. Pu'er alone accounts for 60% of the country's total production. Other provinces where coffee is grown include Fujian and Hainan.

Fujian and Hainan mainly grow Robusta coffee, while Yunnan grows arabica, with Catimor (a Caturra-Timor hybrid) as the varietal of choice.

== Marketing and trade ==
In Yunnan, about half of the crop went to export markets in 2016, generating $280 million in earnings. Most Chinese coffee beans are commercial grade and exports are primarily green beans sent to European markets. The United States is also an export market for Chinese beans, with Starbucks purchasing more than half of the coffee imported into the U.S. from China in January-September 2014. Major trading houses like Volcafe, the coffee arm of London-based commodities trader ED&F Man with an office in Yunnan, and Miami-based commodities trader Coex, source from China to balance deficits in supply from traditional exporting countries during years of drought or crop rust.

The emergence of dedicated specialty coffee farming commenced around 2009 under early adopters such as Hu Xixiang from Mangzhang Farms in Menglian (Pu’er), Yunnan alongside the support of industry professionals such as Timothy Heinze, Joshua Jagelman, and Saxon Wright. While specialty coffee production in China is still less than 2% of total volumes, China's recent selection (2018) as the portrait country at the world's largest Specialty Coffee trade show held by the Specialty Coffee Association emphasizes the growing recognition of China as producer of specialty grade coffees.

Chongqing has emerged as the largest domestic trading hub for coffee. The Chongqing Coffee Exchange was established by the Chongqing Energy Group as a trading platform for both home grown and Southeast Asia sourced coffee. The exchange takes advantage of Chongqing's role as a transportation hub. The city is the starting point of the Chongqing-Xinjiang-Europe freight train, a corridor of the Belt and Road Initiative. Pu’er City also saw the establishment of a coffee trading hub when Yunnan Coffee Exchange started operations in January 2016.

== See also ==
- Coffee wars in China
- List of countries by coffee production
