= Hammarplast =

Swedish consumer products company

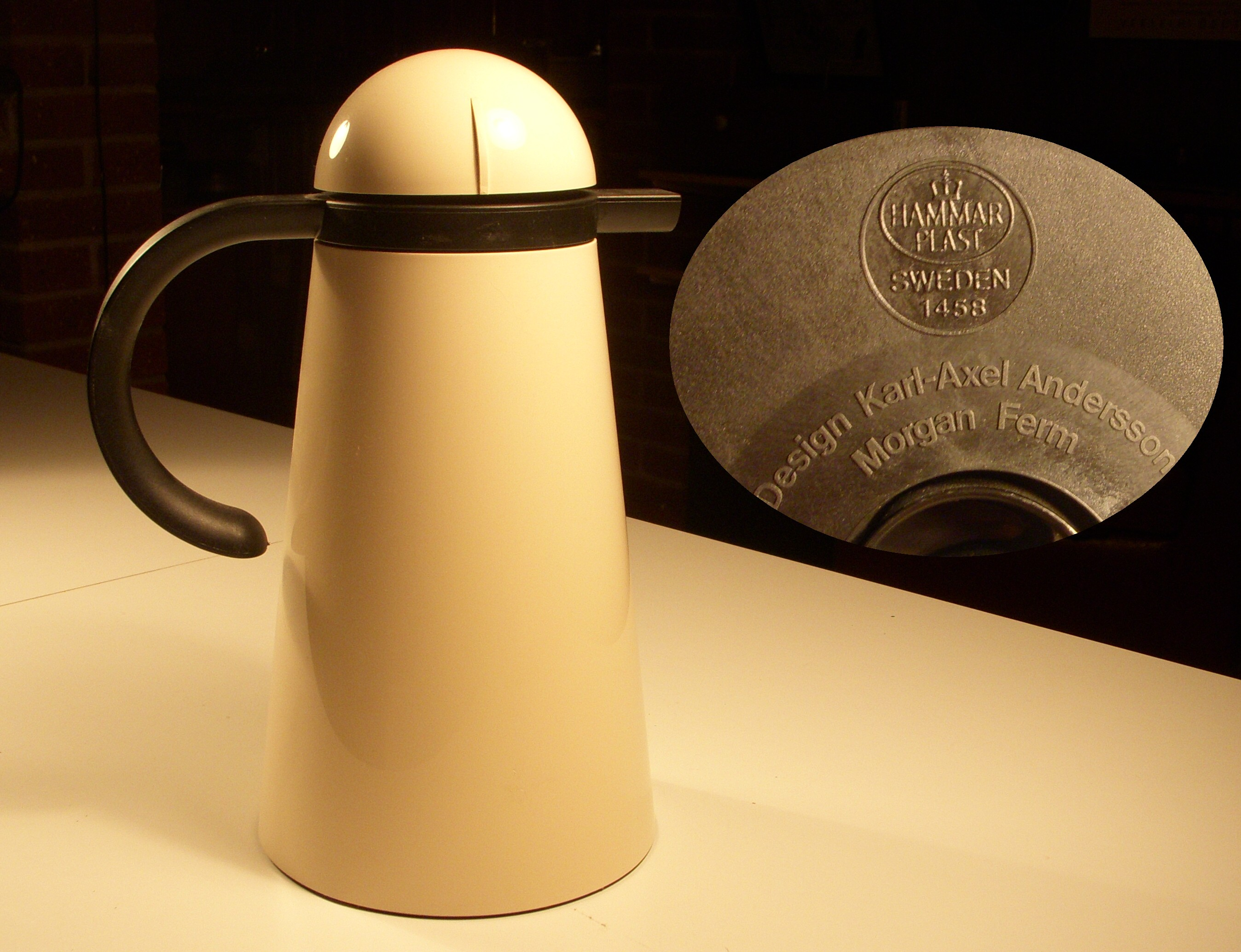
- Coffee thermos flask, designed by Karl-Axel Anderssons and Morgan Ferm
- Industry: Plastics
- Founded: 1947
- Founder: Brothers Carl and Hugo Hammargren
- Defunct: 1985
- Headquarters: Tingsryd, Sweden
- Products: Household goods
- Parent: Oy Orthex Ab, Finland
- Website: http://www.orthex.com

Hammarplast is a Swedish company that manufactures plastic household products. It is a subsidiary of the Finnish Orthex Group.

The company was founded 1947 at Tingsryd in Sweden by the brothers Carl and Hugo Hammargren. One of its designers was Sigvard Bernadotte.

It was owned by Perstorp 1980–1985. It was bought 2011 by Orthex Group of Finland.
