= Friele (surname) =

Friele is a surname of Norwegian origin. Notable people with the surname include:

- Christian Friele (1821–1899), Norwegian newspaper editor
- Einar Friele (1901–1944), Norwegian resistance member
- Herman Friele (born 1943), Norwegian politician
- Johan Friele (1866–1927), Norwegian sailor
- Karen-Christine Friele (1935–2021), Norwegian gay rights activist

== See also ==
- Friel
- Friele, a Norwegian coffee manufacturer
