= Chicken Delight =

American fast-food chain

- Type: Private
- Industry: Restaurants, Food Delivery Franchising
- Founded: 1952; 74 years ago Illinois, United States
- Number of locations: 17 (corporate); approximately 6 independent locations in the US (Note: Several restaurants in the New York metropolitan area operate under the Chicken Delight name independently of the corporate chain and are not affiliated with Chicken Delight of Canada Ltd. See United States legacy locations.)
- Area served: Winnipeg, Manitoba and surrounding area (corporate)
- Products: Pizza; Chicken and buffalo wings; Fries; Chicken burger
- Owners: Tushar Sukhadiya; Dipak Koladiya
- Website: www.chickendelight.com

Chicken Delight is a chain of restaurants offering eat-in, take-out, and delivery service with a menu featuring chicken, pizza, and ribs. Based in Winnipeg, the chain operates outlets primarily in that city and throughout Manitoba, with one location in Alberta. Several additional restaurants operating under the Chicken Delight name are located in the New York metropolitan area, but these operate independently of the corporate chain and are not listed on the corporate website.

Founded in Rock Island, Illinois in 1952, Chicken Delight among the earliest fast-food franchise chains in North America, growing to nearly 800 locations by the mid-1960s, and is notable both for its early role in North American fast-food franchising and the antitrust case Siegel v. Chicken Delight. The 1971 Ninth Circuit ruling, which held that the chain's practice of conditioning the franchise trademark license on franchisees' exclusive purchase of supplies from the franchisor constituted an illegal tying arrangement under the Sherman Antitrust Act, became a landmark case in American franchise law. The U.S. operation collapsed in the early 1970s following the antitrust litigation, competitive pressure from KFC, and the breakdown of the franchise revenue model. The Canadian chain, established as a legally distinct entity in 1958, continues as the present-day Winnipeg-based operation.

== History ==
The Chicken Delight brand has been operated by two legally distinct entities: the original U.S. franchisor, Chicken Delight Inc., founded in Rock Island in 1952, and Chicken Delight of Canada Ltd., which was incorporated in 1958 and continues as the present-day Winnipeg-based operation.

=== Founding and early growth (1952–1965) ===
Chicken Delight was founded on February 28, 1952 by Abraham L. "A.L." Tunick, an entrepreneur based in Rock Island, Illinois, who would later serve as the first chairman of the National Franchise Association. In 1950, Tunick, who operated a wrecking company, purchased the bankrupt Deacon Products Co. of Rock Island, which manufactured a specialized conduction cooker. Tunick had intended to dismantle the plant, but was persuaded by Deacon to witness a demonstration of the cooker's ability to fry chicken, and was impressed.

Having failed to sell the cooker on the appliance market, he leased a storefront on 18th Avenue in Rock Island and, working with his family, began selling take-out chicken dinners, which was a novel concept at the time. He developed a method of coating chicken in spiced breading and deep-frying it quickly. According to Roald Tweet of WVIK, Tunick's method made fried chicken practical as a fast-food item for the first time. Although the venture lost money in its first three years, Tunick bought out his associates who urged bankruptcy and ultimately paid all creditors from earnings. He subsequently developed the Chicken Delight franchise model around the cooker. The franchise contract Tunick developed was used by the Small Business Administration as a model for the franchise industry.

The chain grew from its single Rock Island location to 86 franchises in 23 states by its fifth anniversary in 1957, 164 outlets by 1960, and more than 400 in 47 states, Canada, Puerto Rico and Australia by 1963. When Tunick sold the business to Consolidated Foods — a Chicago-based conglomerate whose other brands included Sara Lee, Shasta, Popsicle, and Booth — in 1965, the chain had approximately 650 outlets, growing to 687 by August of that year and nearly 800 by April 1966. Retail sales exceeded $80 million in 1966 ($794 million in 2025 dollars). Tunick remained as president until mid-1967, by which time the chain had approximately 750 franchises in 44 states.

The chain used slogan, "Don't Cook Tonight, Call Chicken Delight," across North America, and in the late 1950s and early 1960s its mascot was a chicken with a chef's hat holding a plate of biscuits.

=== Decline and legal challenges (1965–1972) ===
By the late 1960s, Chicken Delight faced increasing competition from KFC and struggled to maintain consistent quality across its franchise network. Rival chains such as KFC used field representatives to standardize products, with representatives circulating between stores and revoking franchises that failed to meet corporate standards, while inconsistent quality at Chicken Delight locations damaged the brand's reputation with customers. The chain simultaneously faced a class-action antitrust suit that contributed to the collapse of its U.S. business model. By the end of 1972, Chicken Delight had contracted sharply to approximately 180 stores, down from a peak of approximately 947 according to a retrospective estimate by former executive Wendell Lejeune.

=== Canadian operations (1953–present) ===
Chicken Delight's expansion into Canada began early in the chain's history, with locations operating in Montreal and Winnipeg by 1953 and 1954 respectively, franchised directly from the U.S. parent company. In 1958, a group of Winnipeg businessmen acquired the Canadian Chicken Delight trademarks and franchising rights, opening the first store under Chicken Delight of Canada Ltd. in Portage la Prairie, Manitoba, and a second location in St. Boniface the same year. By January 1964, 22 units were operating under Chicken Delight of Canada Ltd., and more than 50 by the mid-1960s, under the leadership of president Richard B. Earl of Portage la Prairie and secretary-treasurer Alex R. Cunningham of Winnipeg. Chicken Delight of Canada Ltd. was incorporated under federal jurisdiction on November 26, 1958, and held the Canadian Chicken Delight trademarks and franchising rights separately from the U.S. parent company.

=== Otto Koch and Winnipeg consolidation (1969–2010) ===
Otto Koch immigrated to Winnipeg from Herzberg/Harz, Germany in 1959. Together with his first business partner Irv Benne, he purchased his first Chicken Delight franchise on Portage Avenue in May 1969, at the time unaware of the potential consequences of the ongoing antitrust litigation against the U.S. operation. He subsequently acquired additional locations, and between 1976 and 1977 acquired control of Chicken Delight of Canada Ltd. itself. With the brand's reputation diminished by the U.S. collapse, Koch concentrated on updating stores and expanding the chain across Manitoba and rural western Canada. Koch's strategy focused on smaller communities, targeting towns of 3,000 to 6,000 people where Chicken Delight could become the dominant or sole fast food operator, a strategy he described as particularly suited to rural markets where "people travel more than in the past and rural people have higher incomes now... and they want the same convenience as city people."

In 1979, Koch acquired the Chicken Delight trademarks, franchising rights, and corporate operations for the United States and international markets. His partner was Wendell Lejeune, who had managed the U.S. operation for both Consolidated Foods and Action Traders since 1965 and held a 23.5 per cent stake in the newly formed Chicken Delight International Inc. By September 1981, the international operations had been fully consolidated under the Winnipeg head office, with the U.S. management structure in Springfield, Missouri wound down and regional franchise holders dealing directly with Winnipeg. By 1984, the Canadian operation had grown to 34 outlets, while 86 locations remained in the United States. By 1989, the Canadian operation had expanded to 39 stores with locations in Alberta, Saskatchewan, and Ontario in addition to Winnipeg and rural Manitoba. The out-of-province locations subsequently closed, leaving Winnipeg and rural Manitoba as the chain's primary market.

Koch remained as president and owner until his death on December 21, 2010. In June 2012, James and Nadine Cartman acquired the Chicken Delight Group of Companies and undertook a brand refresh including store renovations and new menu items. In August 2023, Tushar Sukhadiya and Dipak Koladiya became the new owners, with Sukhadiya assuming the role of President of Chicken Delight of Canada Ltd. As of 2026, the corporate chain operates 17 locations: 11 in Winnipeg, five elsewhere in Manitoba, and one in Strathmore, Alberta.

=== United States legacy locations ===
Several Chicken Delight restaurants continue to operate in the New York metropolitan area, independently of the corporate Winnipeg chain. These locations trace their origins to franchises that predated the collapse of the U.S. system in the early 1970s. By 1979, the surviving U.S. franchises were concentrated in two areas: approximately 40 stores in New York City, Long Island, and northern New Jersey, and approximately 60 outlets in the Los Angeles area. The Los Angeles locations have since closed, while approximately six New York and New Jersey independents remain in operation as of 2026. These surviving locations predate the expiration of the original Chicken Delight federal trademark registration in 1994.

== Menu ==
Chicken Delight's Canadian corporate locations serve fried chicken, chicken fingers, wings, ribs, and an extensive pizza menu. The chain also offers sides including french fries, poutine, coleslaw, macaroni salad, potato salad, onion rings, and gravy, with honey dill sauce — a condiment particularly associated with Manitoba — among the dipping sauce options. Cheesecake is the only dessert offered.

The independently operated New York and New Jersey locations offer a menu that more closely reflects the original 1960s franchise. These locations use wet-battered chicken, a preparation method in which chicken is dipped in a liquid batter before frying rather than coated in dry breading, using specialized cooking equipment still in operation at some locations. These locations also serve ribs, shrimp, fish, and clams alongside traditional sides such as mashed potatoes and gravy and corn on the cob.

== Advertising and marketing ==
Chicken Delight's marketing was built around its home delivery and take-out model, which was a novel concept when the chain was founded in 1952. The chain emphasized household convenience rather than taste or price and targeted the growing number of women working outside the home in the post-Korean War era.

The jingle "Don't Cook Tonight, Call Chicken Delight" was widely broadcast on American and Canadian radio and television during the 1960s, becoming one of the best-known advertising phrases in North American fast food. The slogan was registered as a trademark in 1962. Under Koch's stewardship of the revived Canadian operation, the chain adopted a secondary slogan, "One Call Takes Care Of It All."

In 1960, the company ran a promotional contest offering a complete franchise store, a year's supplies, a delivery truck, and a trip to Moscow as prizes, drawing more than 54,000 entries. The contest was conceived as a direct response to Soviet Premier Nikita Khrushchev's assertion during his 1959 U.S. visit that there was "no place in the United States for small business," with Tunick intending the winning franchisee's trip to promote American small business enterprise.

Chicken Delight franchises operated cars topped with large chicken figures to promote home delivery, with the "Chickmobile" name trademarked in 1966. One such vehicle, a modified 1958 Ford Thunderbird convertible with a hand-built fiberglass body created in California in the late 1960s, served as a promotional vehicle for the chain in San Francisco before Otto Koch purchased it and shipped it to Winnipeg in 1976, where it was used for local promotions until 1995.

== Antitrust litigation and collapse ==
=== Franchise model ===
Chicken Delight differed from many contemporary franchise systems in that it collected no ongoing royalties, instead deriving its income primarily from markups on supplies and equipment that franchisees were required to purchase exclusively from the franchisor. Franchisees paid neither an upfront franchise fee nor an ongoing royalty, but were required to purchase the chain's specially designed conduction fryer, paper cups, paper plates, chicken coating mix, and trademark-bearing packaging exclusively from the franchisor at prices two to three times open-market rates, with the markups providing the franchisor's primary source of revenue. Annual sales of packaging and supplies to franchisees were estimated at $6.5 million ($63 million in 2025 dollars). The company actively enforced the supply-purchase requirement through litigation, filing suits against individual franchisees who obtained packaging or equipment from outside suppliers as early as 1956 and as late as 1967.

=== Siegel v. Chicken Delight ===
In 1967, a class action lawsuit was filed in the U.S. District Court in San Francisco against Chicken Delight by a group of franchisees who alleged that the company's practice of requiring franchisees to purchase cooking equipment, mixes, and paper products exclusively from the franchisor, at prices two to three times open-market rates, constituted an illegal tying arrangement under the Sherman Antitrust Act. The suit also alleged that Chicken Delight controlled the retail prices franchisees could charge customers through menu approval and advertising control. The case originated when a San Francisco franchisee identified a potential legal challenge to the supply-markup model but did not pursue it; it was subsequently taken up by Bay Area franchisees including Harvey and Elaine Siegel of Berkeley and Richard Zachary of South San Francisco, whose lawsuit eventually became the class proceeding on behalf of 927 franchise holders.

In 1970, Judge George B. Harris of the U.S. District Court for the Northern District of California ruled in favor of the franchisees, finding the supply-markup arrangement constituted an illegal tying arrangement under the Sherman Act. In 1971, the Ninth Circuit Court of Appeals upheld the franchisees' case, ruling that Chicken Delight had violated antitrust law by leveraging its trademark (the "tying product") to compel franchisees to buy distinct tied products. In February 1972, the Supreme Court of the United States declined to disturb the ruling, letting the Ninth Circuit decision stand.

The decision became a landmark in American franchise law, marking a departure from earlier precedent. Court decisions involving the Carvel Ice Cream Company had treated a franchisor's requirement that franchisees buy supplies from it as a legitimate means of protecting the trademark, and therefore not an unlawful tie. Siegel v. Chicken Delight partially reversed that position, holding that the trademark served only as an assurance of product quality, distinct from the franchise's operational requirements, and so could not shield a compelled-purchase arrangement from antitrust scrutiny. The principle it established shaped franchise regulation for decades before being narrowed by Queen City Pizza, Inc. v. Domino's Pizza, Inc.

The original trial court had awarded approximately $8 million ($61.6 million in 2025 dollars) in damages to the franchisees, but on remand the Ninth Circuit ordered a further trial on damages. This ultimately produced a negotiated settlement: in July 1972, U.S. District Judge George B. Harris approved a settlement of $2.5 million ($19.2 million in 2025 dollars) paid to a court-administered fund, covering payments to 927 franchise holders as well as court costs and attorneys' fees.

=== Aftermath ===
Consolidated Foods had already written off its investment in Chicken Delight in fiscal 1971 and, in August of that year, announced it was negotiating to sell the subsidiary to an undisclosed buyer described as "a well-established company already actively engaged in franchise operations," though it declined to name the prospective purchaser or disclose terms. In May 1972, the company announced that it had sold the right to use the Chicken Delight name and trademark on April 25, 1972 to Capital Diversified Industries, Ltd., of London, Ontario, for an undisclosed amount to be paid over a period of time based on a growth formula. The settlement required franchisees using the Chicken Delight name to either sign a new franchise contract with Capital Diversified or cease using the name within a period to be fixed by the court.

Consolidated Foods transferred the brand to Capital Diversified Industries, Ltd., which subsequently renamed itself Action Traders Inc. and relocated to Toronto. Action Traders, which also owned the Red Barn hamburger restaurant chain, proved unable to revive the Chicken Delight operation. Action Traders subsequently exited the food business entirely in favor of sporting goods distribution, terminating the Red Barn chain and disposing of its food processing interests before agreeing to sell the Chicken Delight trademarks, patents, and systems to Koch and Lejeune in 1979.

Former executive Wendell Lejeune later characterized the outcome as a Pyrrhic victory for the franchisees. During the years the case was before the courts, Consolidated Foods was unable to charge for packaging materials or introduce a new royalty system without amending its contracts with franchisees, most of whom refused to accept changes while litigation was pending. With its income eliminated, Consolidated stopped providing advertising and other support services to franchisees, who responded by leaving the organization. Many sold their restaurants, without the Chicken Delight name, often at a loss. With the supply-markup model confirmed as Chicken Delight's sole source of revenue, the court rulings rendered the U.S. franchise system's existing business model unworkable, and the chain contracted sharply through the early 1970s. As Lejeune later observed, the collapse had nothing to do with public perception of the brand: "The name was not tarnished by the lawsuit as far as the customers' point of view. The public didn't know anything about it. There was virtually no negative response from the customers."

The case has since been re-evaluated by economists as an example of the complexity of antitrust policy. Economist Paul L. Joskow of MIT argued that the Chicken Delight supply-markup model represented a rational solution to a practical enforcement problem: because the chain operated cash businesses in which franchisees could easily underreport sales, requiring franchisees to purchase supplies from the franchisor provided a reliable proxy for revenue as more business meant more supplies ordered, making it harder to conceal profits. Joskow, who taught the case as an example of flawed antitrust enforcement, noted that franchisees had not been compelled to sign up with Chicken Delight and that competition in the market was robust.

== See also ==
- List of fast-food chicken restaurants
