= International Trade Awards =

The International Trade Awards, held for the first time in 2007, are the UK's premier awards devoted exclusively to recognising excellence in import, export and international trade achievement.

This is a series of twelve regional International Trade Awards. Winners from each region are announced at presentation ceremonies held from February through to December with the winners automatically progressing as national finalists.

== Objectives ==
The objectives of the awards are to:

- Identify and reward the UK's most successful and innovative exporters
- Promote the UK's top exporters as corporate role models in order to stimulate greater involvement in international trade amongst UK businesses
- Promote the leading exporters of local and regional areas to encourage international trade by all companies irrespective of size and location
- Further develop community awareness of the importance of exporting to the UK's economic future

== Sponsor ==
The International Trade Awards are sponsored by HSBC.

== 2007 winners ==
The 2007 regional winners were:

- Long O'Donnell Associates (North West winner)
- Immunodiagnostic Systems (North East winner)
- Nisa (Yorkshire and Humberside winner)
- Geothermal International (West Midlands winner)
- University of Nottingham (East Midlands winner)
- GigaSat (East of England winner)
- Star Syringe (South East winner)
- The Ford Farm (South West winner)
- MET Studio Design (London winner)
- Randox Laboratories (Northern Ireland winner)
- Daniels Fans (Welsh winner)
- 4i2i Communications (Scotland winner)

The 2007 national winners announced at The House of Lords on 2 April 2008 were:

- Star Syringe (Innovation Category winner)
- The Ford Farm (SME Category winner)
- GigaSat (Overall winner)

== 2008 winners ==
The 2008 regional winners are:

- James Halstead (North West winner)
- Davy Roll (North East winner)
- Penn Pharmaceutical Services (Wales winner)

== See also ==
- List of the largest trading partners of United Kingdom
