= Original Starbucks =

Store at Pike Place Market, Seattle, Washington, U.S.

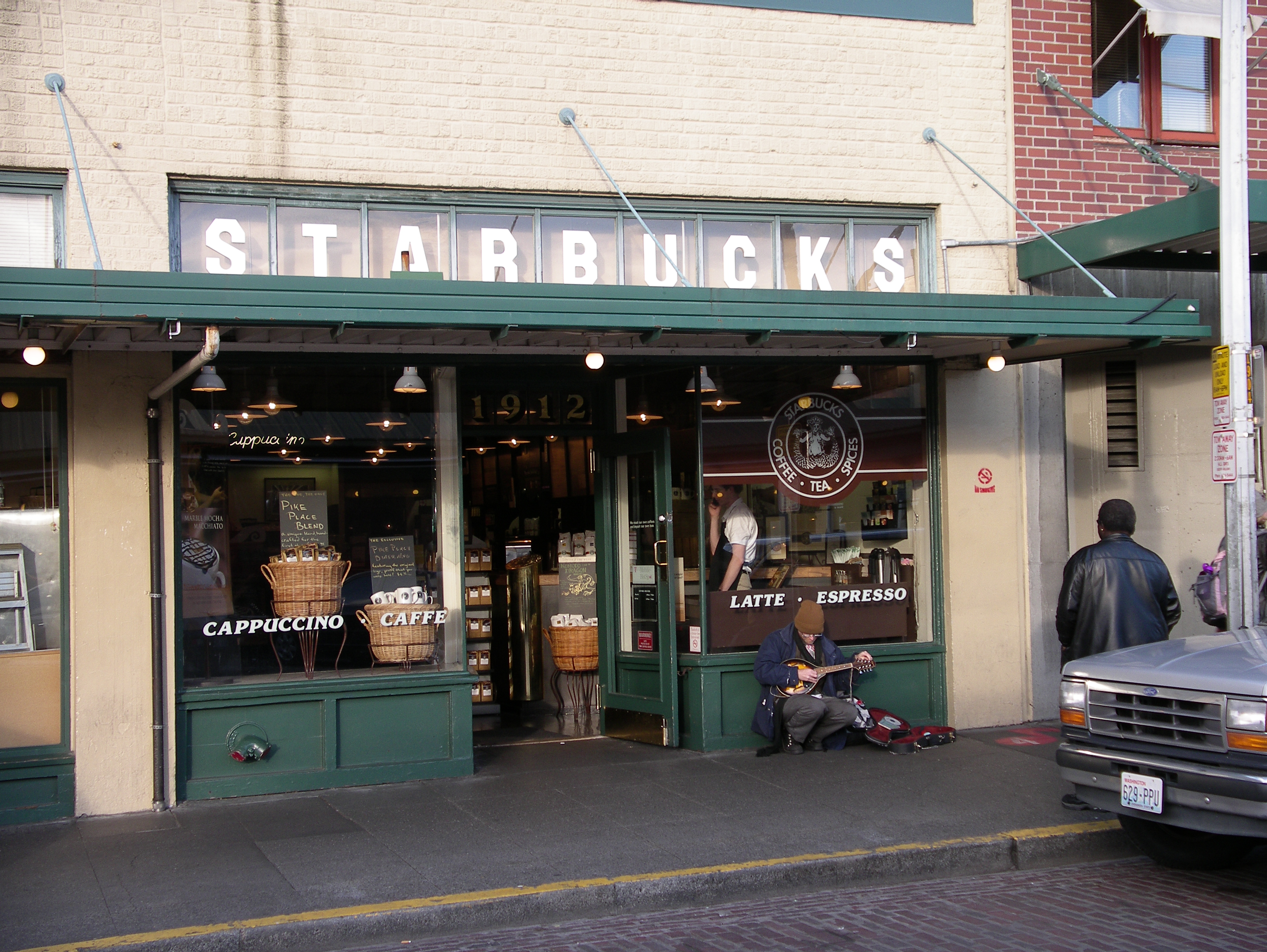
- The store's exterior in March 2006
- Interactive map of Original Starbucks

Restaurant information
- Established: March 30, 1971; 55 years ago
- Location: 1912 Pike Place, Seattle, Washington, United States
- Coordinates: 47.60990°N 122.34244°W

The Pike Place Starbucks store, also known as the "Original Starbucks", is the first Starbucks store, established in 1971 at Pike Place Market, in the downtown core of Seattle, Washington, United States.

The doors to the first Starbucks store opened on March 30, 1971. It was founded by Gordon Bowker, Jerry Baldwin, and Zev Siegl.

While commonly referred to as the first Starbucks location, the current address is the second for the Pike Place store. The first restaurant was located at 2000 Western Avenue for five years. It is now at 1912 Pike Place. The store is one of three in what is referred to as "The Heritage Market". A term in which Starbucks uses to describe the historical and iconic locations, representing the company's early roots and milestones of its journey. Together, these stores (all within five blocks of one another) are able to showcase the past, present and future of Starbucks.

The store has kept its early appearance over time, and is subject to design guidelines and historic significance. It is known for tourist attraction and hosting crowds. The store began by selling whole bean coffee, tea, and spices.

== See also ==
- List of restaurants in Pike Place Market
