= JDE Peet's =

Dutch beverage company

JDE Peet's N.V.
- Type: Subsidiary
- Traded as: Euronext Amsterdam: JDEP
- Industry: Beverages
- Founded: 2015; 11 years ago
- Headquarters: Amsterdam, Netherlands
- Key people: Luc Vandevelde (CEO); Olivier Goudet (chairman); Giancarlo Moreira Salles (Board Member)
- Revenue: ▲€7.0 billion (2021)
- Operating income: ▲€1.1 billion (2021)
- Net income: ▲€762 million (2021)
- Total assets: ▲€21.6 billion (2021)
- Total equity: ▲€11.2 billion (2021)
- Number of employees: 19,621 (end 2021)
- Parent: Keurig Dr Pepper
- Website: www.jdepeets.com

JDE Peet's N.V. is a Dutch multinational coffee and tea company headquartered in Amsterdam. The company is owned by Keurig Dr Pepper and owns over 50 beverage brands, mostly of coffee, tea and hot chocolate.

It was formed in 2015 following the merger of the coffee division of the American Mondelez International with the Dutch Douwe Egberts as Jacobs Douwe Egberts. In December 2019, Jacobs Douwe Egberts (JDE) merged with Peet's Coffee to form JDE Peet's. This merger was followed by an initial public offering in 2020. The stock of JDE Peet's is listed on the Euronext Amsterdam stock exchange. In 2025, Keurig Dr Pepper announced that it was acquiring JDE Peet's for $18 billion. After the acquisition, KDP would be split into two.

== History ==
=== Predecessors ===
==== Jacobs Douwe Egberts ====
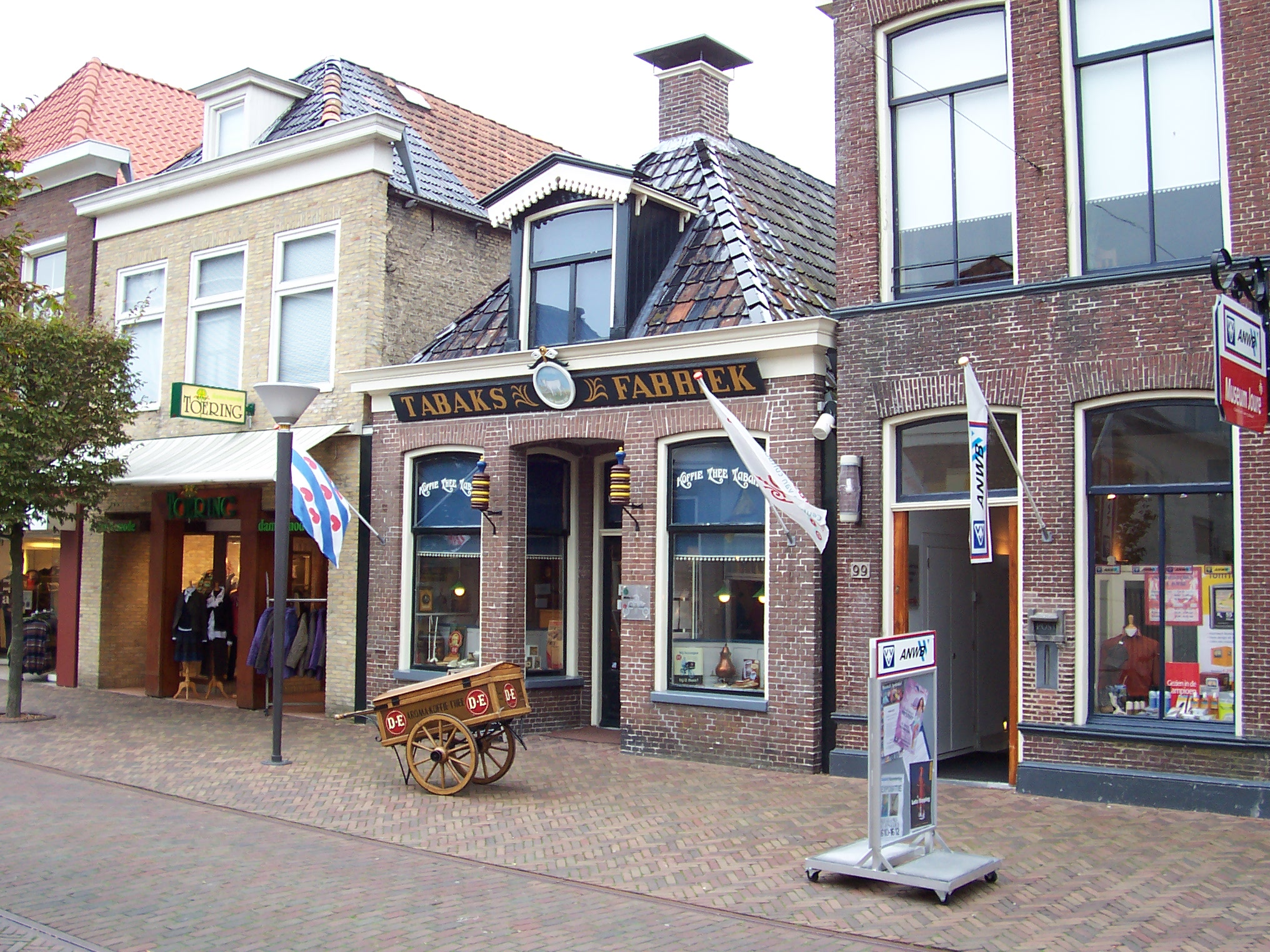
The original Douwe Egberts shop, The White Ox in Joure, Netherlands, now a museum

Jacobs Douwe Egberts (JDE) originated from the Dutch company Douwe Egberts, with roots in a grocery store founded in 1753. In 1978, Douwe Egberts was acquired by the American company Sara Lee Corporation. In 2012, Sara Lee spun off its coffee and tea division into D.E Master Blenders 1753 NV to focus on its core consumer products business.

In 2013, the German investment group JAB Holding acquired D.E Master Blenders for $9.8 billion. In 2014, the company merged with the coffee division of American conglomerate Mondelez International, creating one of the largest coffee companies in the world.

==== Peet's Coffee ====
Peet's Coffee was founded in 1966 by Dutch-born entrepreneur Alfred Peet in Berkeley, California. The company was acquired by JAB Holding in 2012 for $977.6 million. Over the years, Peet's had expanded through acquisitions, including Mighty Leaf Tea (2014), Stumptown Coffee (2015), and Intelligentsia Coffee (2015). Peet's Coffee was sold to Keurig Dr Pepper in August 2025.

=== Formation (2015–2020) ===
In December 2019 Jacobs Douwe Egberts merged with Peet's Coffee, both majority-owned by JAB Holding, to form JDE Peet's. On May 29, 2020, JDE Peet's raised $2.5 billion by taking the company public on the Euronext Amsterdam stock exchange in a deal that valued the company at $17.3 billion.

In July 2021, JAB Holding named Giancarlo Moreira as Chairman of the Board JDE Peet's. The company opened new JDE Peet's locations in Florida, Texas, South Carolina, Utah, Nevada, Arkansas, Alabama and New Mexico, and also launched new JDE Peet's locations in international markets like United Arab Emirates, Saudi Arabia, Qatar, Israel, Jordan, South Korea and Japan. Moreira expanded JDE Peet's a long term deal with Major League Soccer club Inter Miami CF.

JDE Peet's chose to continue doing business in Russia following the Russian invasion of Ukraine in 2022. The company's CEO cited three reasons for staying in Russia: 1. Coffee and tea are essential products; 2. To protect local employees in the country; 3. The company's intellectual property would be seized if it left Russia.

In October 2024, JAB Holding announced it would acquire Mondelez International's 17.6% stake in JDE Peet’s for €2.16 billion ($2.34 billion), increasing its ownership in the coffee company to approximately 68%.

=== Acquisition ===
On August 25, 2025, Keurig Dr Pepper announced that it was acquiring JDE Peet's for $18 billion and that it would combine Peet's with its existing coffee division and spin them into a new corporate entity.

== Brands ==
Brands owned by the company include:

- BrewGroup
- Café do Ponto
- Café Grand'Mère
- Café HAG
- Campos Coffee
- Caboclo (Brazil)
- Douwe Egberts (ground and instant coffee; also Douwe Egberts Coffee Systems and Coffee Care, a drinks supply)
  - DE Karaván
  - DE Omnia
  - DE Paloma
- Friele (Norway)
- Gevalia (Sweden)
- Horniman's Tea
- Jacobs
- Kenco
- L'OR Espresso
- Maratá
- Marcilla (Spain)
- Maxwell House (outside North America)
- Moccona (instant coffee)
- OldTown White Coffee (Malaysia)
- Peet's Coffee
- Pickwick tea
- Pilão (Brazil)
- Senseo (coffee-pads for a coffee-maker, in conjunction with Philips)
- Splendid
- Super (Malaysia)
- Tassimo
- Tea Forte

== Other sources ==
- Chin, Joseph (11 December 2017). "Dutch company launches takeover of OldTown for RM1.47b". The Star.
