= Friel =

Friel is a surname, and may refer to

== People ==
- Aisling Friel (born 1980s)
- Anna Friel (born 1976), British actress
- Arthur O. Friel (1887–1959), writer
- Benny Friel (1941–2010), Scottish footballer
- Bill Friel (1876–1959), American baseball player
- Brian Friel (1929–2015), Northern Ireland playwright and director
- Courtney Friel (born 1980), American television presenter
- Dan Friel (1860–1911), Scottish footballer
- Eddie Friel, musician
- Eileen Friel, American astronomer
- Fran Friel, American author
- George Friel (1910–1975)
- Gerry Friel (1943–2007), basketball coach
- Henry J. Friel (1823–1869), Canadian mayor
- Howard Friel, American scholar and author
- Jack Friel (1898–1995), American college sports coach and executive
- Joe Friel (born 1943), multisport athletics coach
- John Friel (1889–1963), Irish politician and merchant
- Lisa Friel, New York City lawyer and prosecutor
- Mary Therese Friel (born 1960), former Miss USA; now owner-operator of self-named modeling agency
- Pat Friel (1860–1924), American baseball player
- Sheldon Friel (1888–1970), Irish dentist
- Tony Friel (born 1958), British bass guitarist
- William Friel, American politician

== See also ==
- O'Friel
- Friels
- Friele (surname)
- Freel
