= O'Friel =

O'Friel (Irish: Ó Fearghial or Ó Frighil) is a surname of Tyrconnell (modern-day County Donegal).

The origin of the names comes from Firghil (Ó Fearghial or Fergal), a descendant of Eoghan, (son of Niall Noígíallach, the most prolific warrior in Irish history) brother of St. Columcille, and are thus nearest in descent to Columcille. The name Fearghial is composed of "fear." meaning man and "gal," meaning valour.

The leading line of the family were hereditary coarbs of Kilmacrennan, County Donegal. Before the introduction of Christianity, the family was a hereditary line of Druid priests/priestesses. The Chief of the Name possessed the hereditary right of inaugurating O'Donnell as lord of Tirconnell.

Not being a powerful or numerous sept they do not appear very frequently in the national records. The records of the Diocese of Raphoe have many references to distinguished ecclesiastics of the name, both as O'Friel and Friel, including one Bishop Florence or Feargal O'Friel (d. 1299). Amhalgaid Ó Frighil was one of the many clergy from Raphoe and Derry who went to Iona - he was elected Abbot of Iona in 1203.

== Present day ==
Friel (Freel, Freels) is seen more common as a surname than the traditional O'Friel. Statistics relating to the modern distribution of the population indicate that the name is seldom met with outside County Donegal and contiguous areas. The name is very closely associated with the north Donegal, especially Fanad and surrounding areas. Notable descendants include the playwright Brian Friel (born 1929) and the actress Anna Friel (born 1976).

Another spelling of the surname is Freel or Freels.

== See also ==
- Friel
- Friels
- Freel
- Freels (disambiguation)
