= Zev Siegl =

American keynote speaker and presenter (born 1942)

Zev Shahin
- Born: December 28, 1942 (age 83); Detroit, Michigan, U.S.
- Education: University of Washington
- Occupations: Businessman, speaker, presenter
- Known for: Co-founder of Starbucks
- Spouse: Robin Siegl

Zev Shahin (born December 28, 1942) is an American keynote speaker and presenter. He co-founded Starbucks, with Gordon Bowker and Jerry Baldwin, in 1971, and was a director of the company during its first decade.

== Early life ==
Zev Siegl was born on December 28, 1942, in Detroit, Michigan to a Jewish family. His father, Henry Siegl (1911–1997), was a concert violinist who, starting in 1956, was the concertmaster of the Seattle Symphony Orchestra for 26 years. Siegl grew up in New York before moving to Seattle in 1956. His mother, Eleanor Shapiro Siegl (1917–1996), was an educator and founder of The Little School, now located on a campus in Kirkland, Washington.

== Career ==
In March 1971, Siegl, Jerry Baldwin and Gordon Bowker established Starbucks Coffee Company in Seattle, Washington. Siegl, a former public school history teacher, was the company's first paid employee. Siegl often mentions in his public talks that Starbucks wouldn't have been what it is today without the early mentorship they received from Alfred Peet, who at the time was running an already successful coffee stores chain. Following a decade as vice president and a director, Siegl left Starbucks, which had expanded to dominate the gourmet coffee trade in Seattle, with six Seattle-area stores and a wholesale business.

Siegl is the founder of several other small businesses, including Quartermaine Coffee Roasters, in Rockville, Maryland, near Washington, DC.

In 2004, Siegl joined the federally funded Washington Small Business Development Center where he was lead advisor until 2012. While with the WSBDC he worked directly with more than 500 individual entrepreneurs and SMEs.

Since 2013, Siegl has been a keynote presenter at major entrepreneurship and business conferences worldwide (Kuwait City, Santiago, Kuala Lumpur, Johannesburg, Warsaw, Mexico City, etc. Zev has also given virtual talks for large audiences of more than 10,000 attendees and has spoken for major corporations like IBM.

Siegl also mentors MBA candidates at the two large universities located in Seattle, The Foster School of Business at The University of Washington and The Albers School of Business and Economics at Seattle University, and he coaches selected first-time entrepreneurs.

== Personal life ==
Siegl is married and lives in Seattle, Washington.
