= Johann Benckiser =

Founder of Joh. A. Benckiser GmbH (1782–1851)

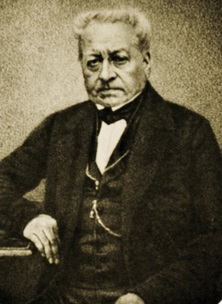
- Born: Johann Adam Benckiser; December 30, 1782
- Died: May 7, 1851 (aged 68)
- Occupation: Chemist
- Known for: Founding Joh. A. Benckiser GmbH

Johann Adam Benckiser (30 December 1782 – 7 May 1851) was a German chemist who founded Joh. A. Benckiser GmbH, a major German chemicals business. Since 1999, the business has been part of Reckitt, a constituent of the FTSE 100 Index.

== Career ==
In 1823, Benckiser founded a business in Pforzheim, Germany, specialising in industrial chemicals and consumer goods. He initially made ammonia, hydrochloric acid and ammonium chloride. Karl Ludwig Reimann, a chemist, joined the business in 1828 and married Benckiser's daughter. Benckiser died in May 1851. After that, the company was owned and enlarged by the Reimann family. In the 1980s, it became a substantial company under the guidance of manager Peter Harf.
