= Moccona =

Brand of coffee

Moccona is a brand of coffee owned by JDE Peet's.

== Varieties ==
Moccona comes in the following flavour variations:

- Classic Medium Roast
- Classic Dark Roast
- Caramel
- Vanilla
- Hazelnut
- Temptation
- Indulgence
- Mystique
- Espresso
- Caffè Mocha Kenya
- Select
- Classic Half Caff
- Decaffeinated
