= Espresso House =

Swedish coffeehouse chain

- Type: Subsidiary
- Industry: Food; Coffeehouse
- Founded: 1996; 30 years ago in Lund, Sweden
- Founder: Elisabet Asker; Charles Asker
- Headquarters: Stockholm, Sweden
- Number of locations: 510 (2023)
- Area served: Denmark, Finland, Germany, Norway, and Sweden
- Revenue: ▲1.4 billion SEK (2018)
- Operating income: ▲125.368 million SEK (2018)
- Net income: ▼ -4.940 million SEK (2018)
- Total equity: ▼76.820 million SEK
- Number of employees: 1697 (December 2018)
- Parent: JAB Holding Company (2015)
- Subsidiaries: Johan & Nyström
- Website: espressohouse.com

Espresso House is the largest coffeehouse chain in the Nordic countries. The company was founded in Lund, Sweden, in 1996 by Elisabet and Charles Asker. In April 2023 it reached over 510 locations throughout Sweden, Norway, Finland, Denmark, and Germany.

== History ==
Espresso House was founded by the couple Elisabet and Charles Asker with the coffee bar Café Java in Gothenburg. The first café bearing the name Espresso House opened on street Kyrkogatan in Lund 1996. In 2005 the chain consisted of sixteen different cafes, which in March 2018 had expanded to 430 coffee shops. All bread and pastry served is baked by the central bakery Espresso House Bakery in Malmö.

== Organisation ==
JAB Holding Company, who in connection with the purchase of Espresso House also bought Baresso Coffee in Denmark, decided during the fall of 2016 that all 45 cafés in the Danish chain would convert to Espresso House.

Until September 2012, Espresso House was owned by the British private equity firm Palamon Capital Partners, that also acquired the coffee shop chain Coffee Cup that started in Stockholm 1997. The two brands were united under Espresso House. In September 2012, the chain was acquired by the Norwegian private equity firm Herkules Capital that later sold it again in 2015 to the German family business JAB Holding Company.

== Locations ==
As of April 2023, there were 510 stores in the following countries:

Country	Number of stores
Denmark	76
Finland	73
Norway	63
Sweden	258
Germany	40

== Impact ==
Espresso House has been compared to Starbucks in North America in regards to its ubiquity and spread. In Norway, the chain has become a symbol of gentrification and "commercial monoculture".

In January 2022 the Finnish investigative journalism show M.O.T reported multiple occasions of mismanagement, hygiene related issues and employees having monthly working hours exceeding lawful limits.

== Gallery ==
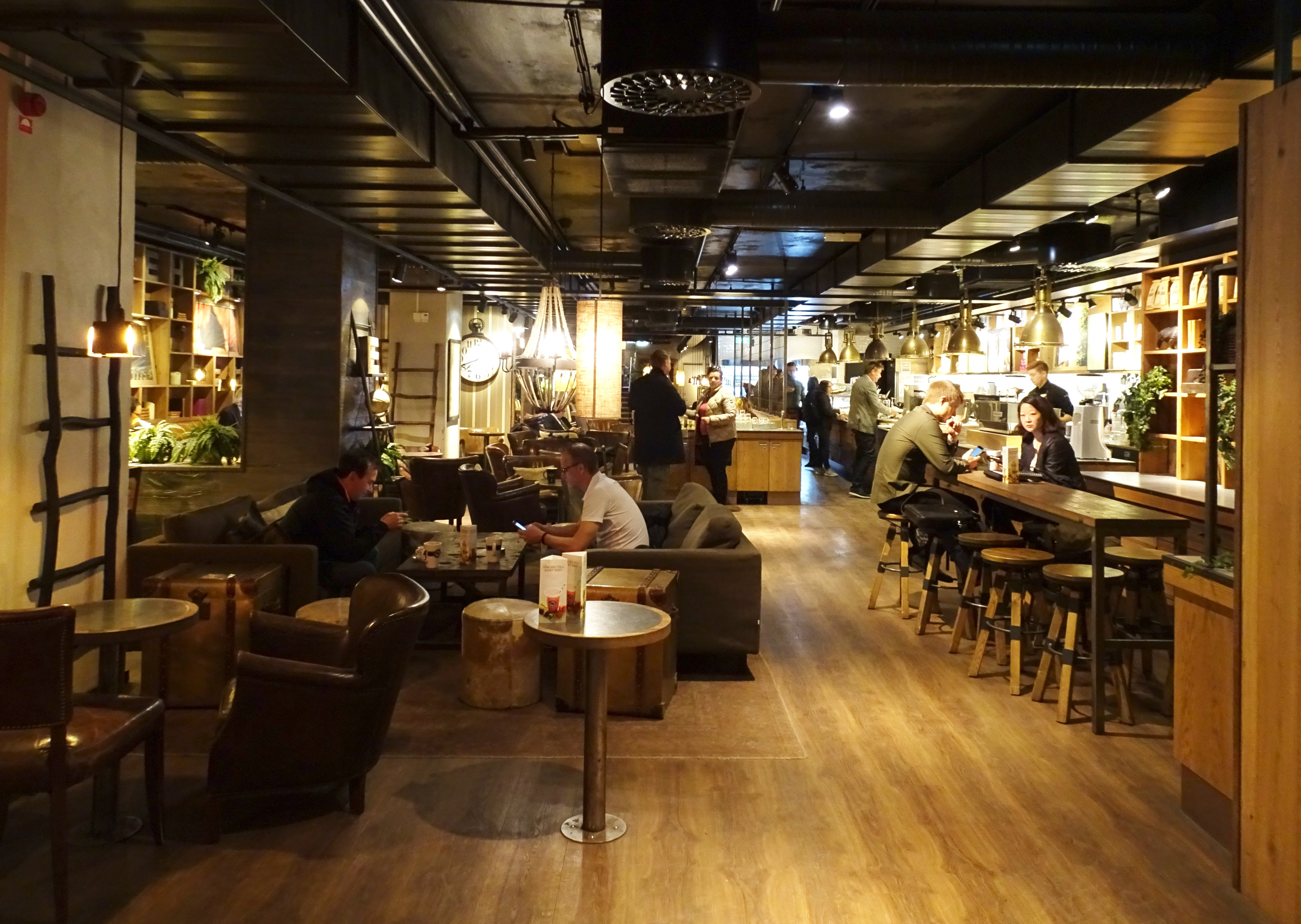
The branch at Stockholm Concert Hall.

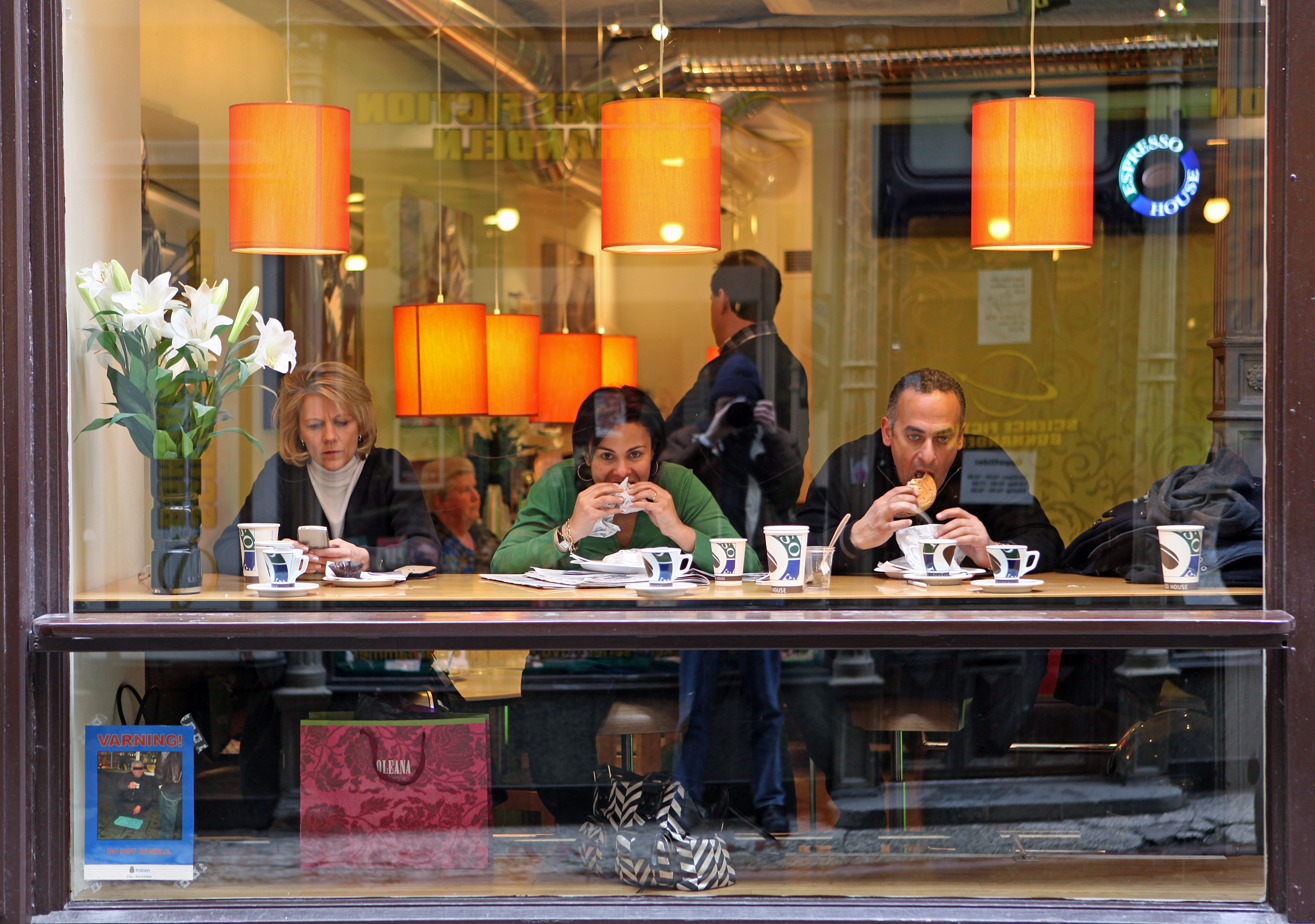
The branch at Västerlånggatan, Stockholm.

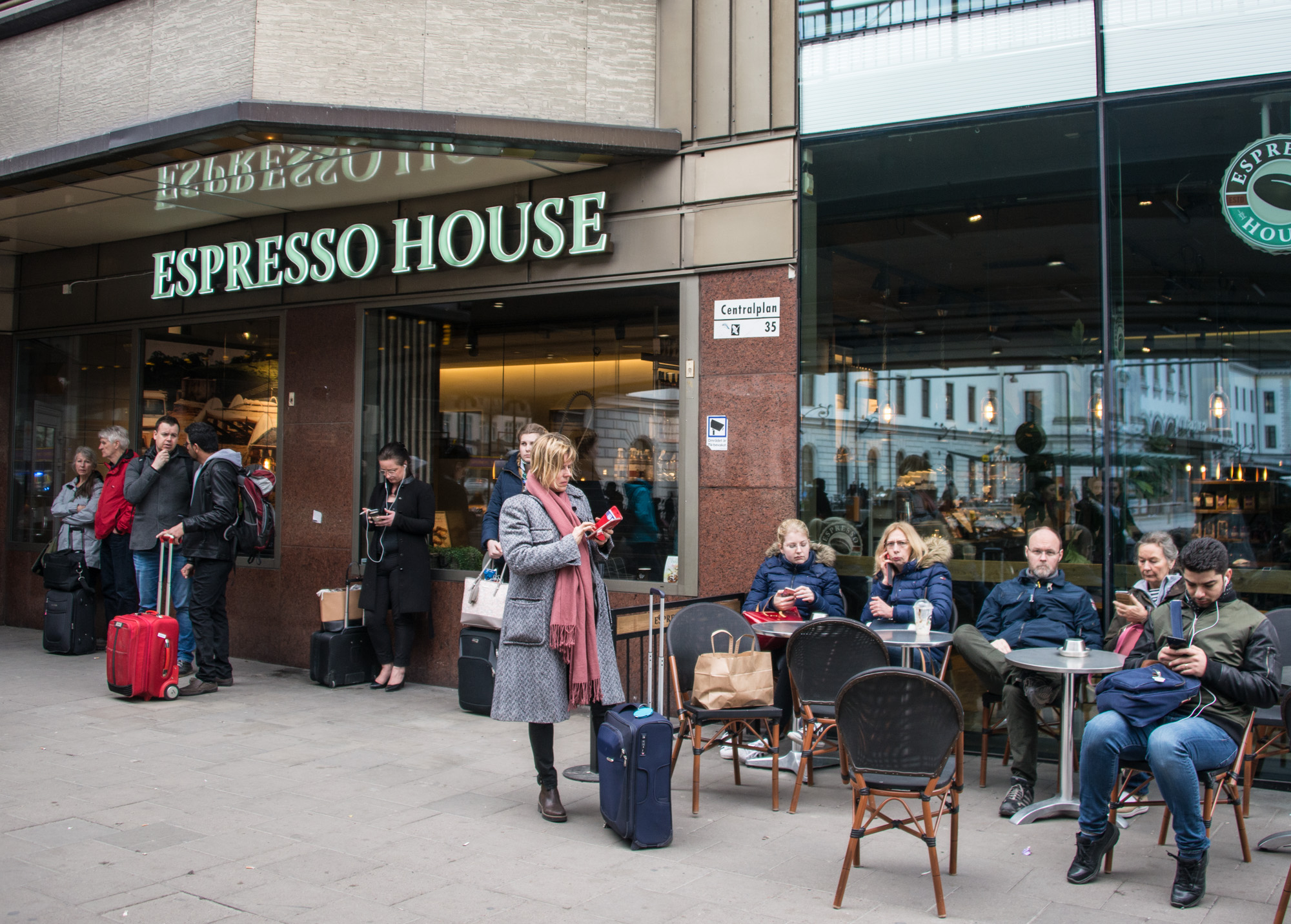
The branch at Drottninggatan, Stockholm.

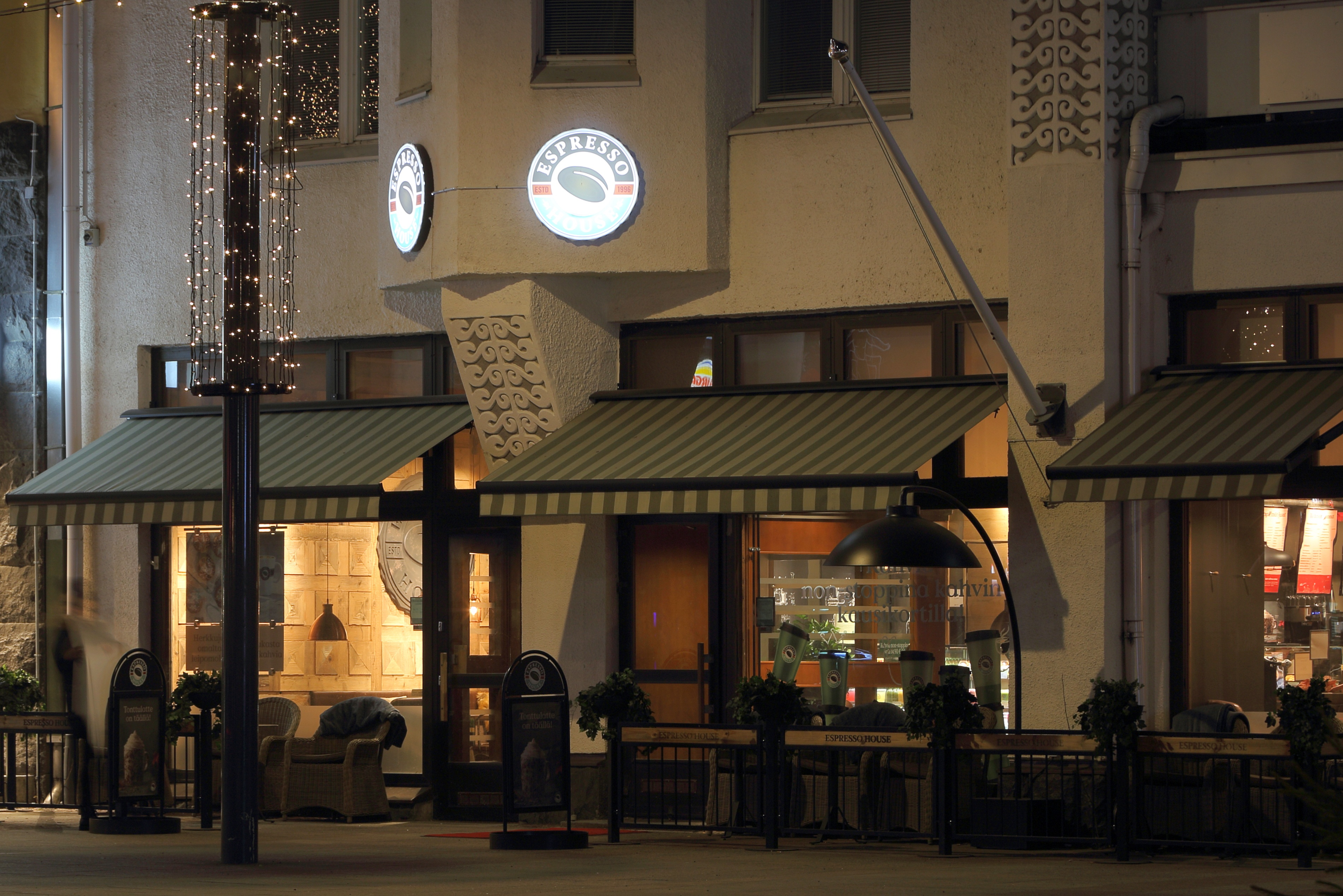
The branch at the Pallas House, Oulu, Finland.
