= Freel =

Freel is a surname. Notable people with the surname include:

- Aleta Freel (1907–1935), American stage actress
- Edward J. Freel, American politician
- Ryan Freel (1976–2012), American baseball player

== See also ==
- Friel
- Freels (disambiguation)
- O'Friel
