= Friels =

Friels is a surname. Notable people with the surname include:

- Colin Friels (born 1952), Scottish-born Australian actor
- Gavin Friels (born 1977), Scottish footballer and manager

== See also ==
- Freels (disambiguation)
- Friel
- O'Friel
