= OldTown White Coffee =

Malaysian restaurant chain

OLDTOWN Berhad

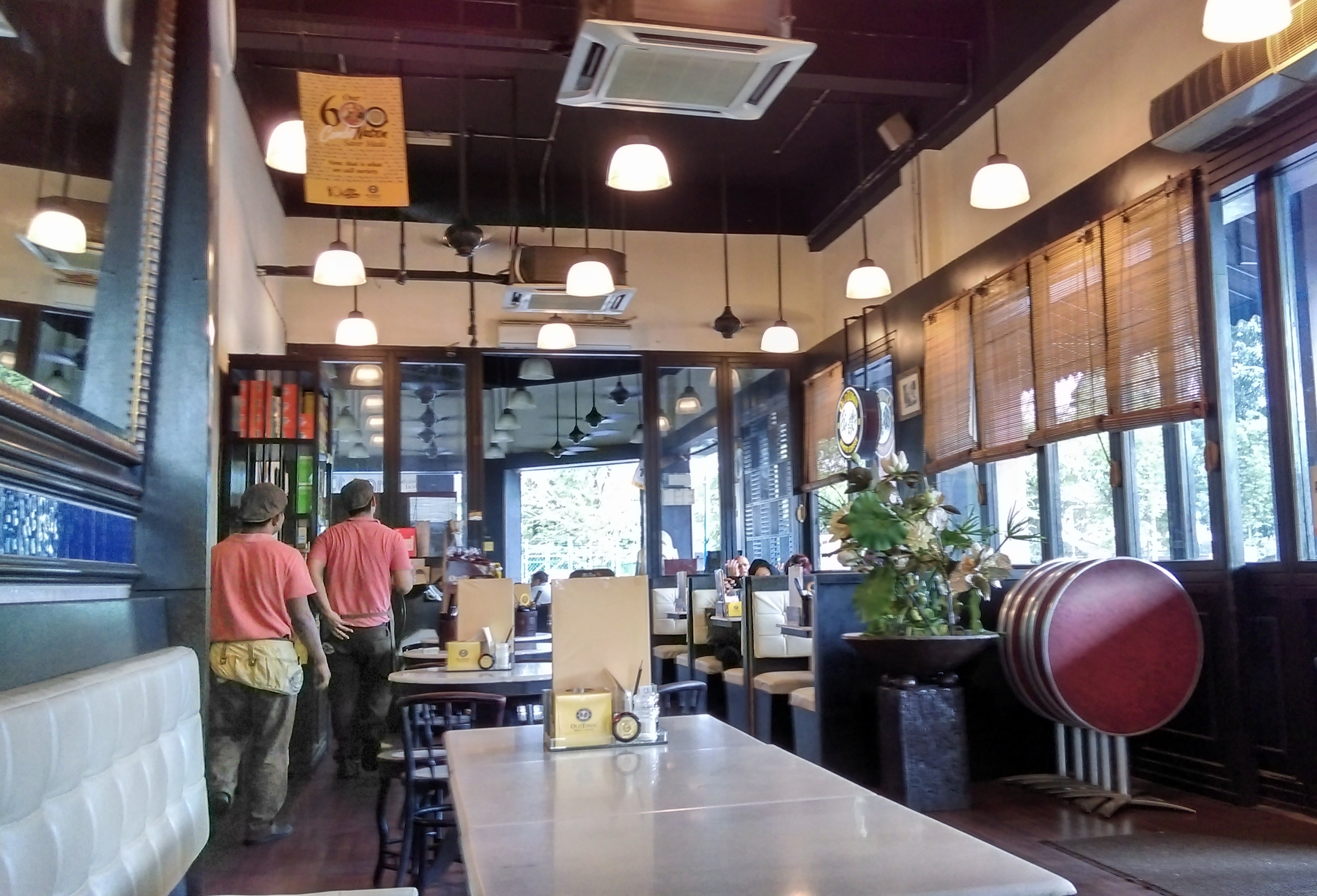
- An OldTown White Coffee Outlet
- Type: Public
- ISIN: MYL5201OO008
- Industry: Coffee house
- Founded: 1999; 27 years ago in Ipoh, Perak, Malaysia
- Founders: Goh Ching Mun; Tan Say Yap
- Headquarters: Tasek Industrial Estate, Ipoh, Malaysia
- Number of locations: 232 outlets (2018)
- Area served: Asia
- Key people: Datuk Dr. Ahmed Tasir Bin Lope Pihie (Independent Non-Executive Chairman); Lee Siew Heng (Group Managing Director); Goh Ching Mun (Executive Director, Chairman)
- Products: Coffee • Milk Tea • Fusion cuisine
- Revenue: ▲MYR 425.2 million (2017)
- Operating income: ▲MYR 60.77 million (2017)
- Total assets: ▲MYR 1.334 billion (2018)
- Total equity: ▲MYR 1.473 billion (2018)
- Parent: JDE Peet's
- Subsidiaries: White Cafe Sdn Bhd; Gongga Food Sdn Bhd; White Cafe Marketing Sdn Bhd; Emperor’s Kitchen Sdn Bhd; Dynasty Confectionery Sdn Bhd; Esquire Chef Sdn Bhd; Kopitiam Asia Pacific Sdn Bhd; Oldtown Singapore Pte Ltd; Old Town Kopitiam Butterworth Sdn Bhd; Old Town Kopitiam Kuala Lumpur Sdn Bhd; Old Town Kopitiam Cheras Sdn Bhd; Oldtown Logistics Sdn Bhd; Old Town (M) Sdn Bhd; Oldtown APP Sdn Bhd; Conneczone Sdn Bhd; Plus One Solution Sdn Bhd; OTK Eatery Sdn Bhd
- Website: oldtown.com.my

OldTown Berhad (doing business as OldTown White Coffee; Chinese: 舊街場白咖啡) is Malaysia's largest halal-certified coffee restaurant chain. The company also manufactures and sells instant beverage products and mixes. It operates over 200 café outlets located throughout Malaysia and other countries in the region, such as China, Indonesia, the Philippines, and formerly Singapore and Australia, and has plans to expand into Vietnam, South Korea and Bangladesh.

Established in 1999 in Ipoh, Perak, the company was taken over by Jacobs Douwe Egberts Holdings Asia NL BV in 2017.

== History ==
The company was established in 1999 in Ipoh, Perak. In 2005, the company expanded into the food service sector with the opening of a chain of café outlets based on the traditional Ipoh coffee shop setting and ambience under the brand name "OldTown White Coffee".

The company is publicly listed on Bursa Malaysia on the main board. In 2017, OldTown Berhad, was taken over by Jacobs Douwe Egberts Holdings Asia NL BV (JDE), a Dutch beverage company, following an offer valued at RM1.47 billion.

== Domestic market ==
In 2013, OldTown had 200 stores in Malaysia. The group achieved the 200th outlet in a period of 7 years.

== Overseas expansion ==
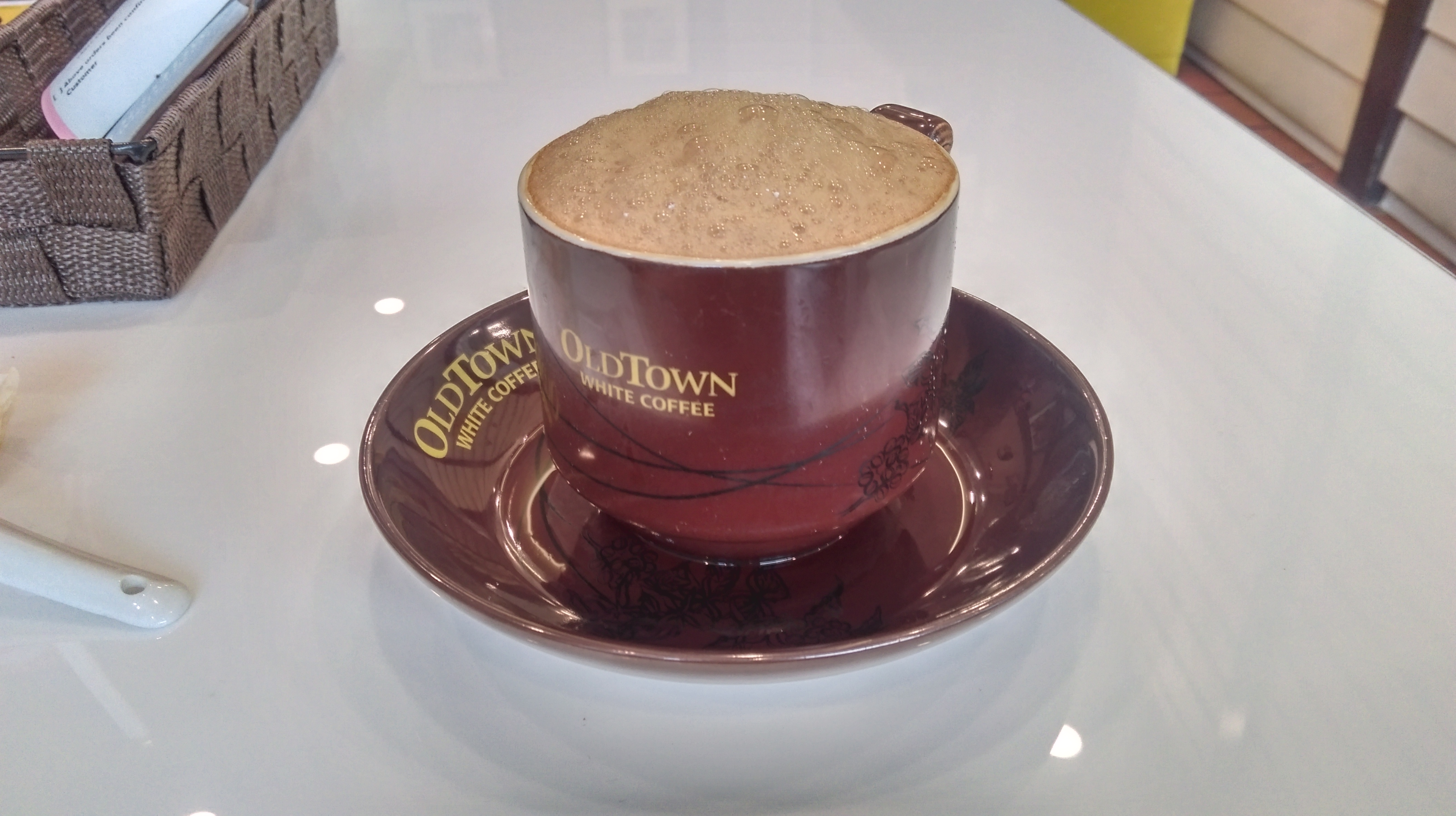
A cup of OldTown White Coffee served at one of its Signature outlets.

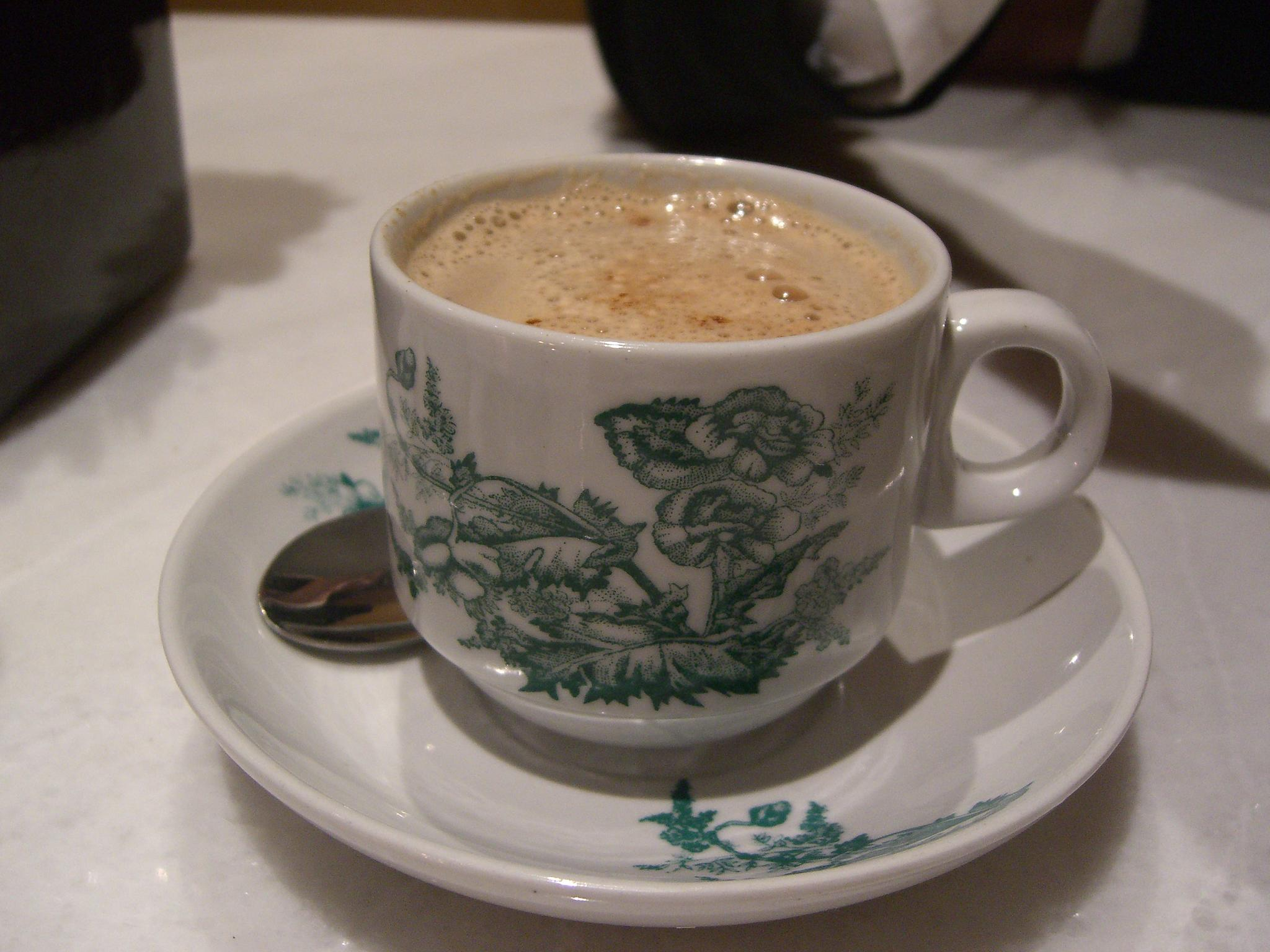
A cup of Ipoh white coffee in OldTown Kopitiam in Melbourne, Australia.

=== Singapore ===
From 10 OldTown White Coffee outlets in Singapore in 2015, the last outlet closed in October 2026.

=== Indonesia ===
Currently OldTown has 16 outlets in Indonesia in areas such as Java and Bali.

=== Australia ===
OldTown planned to open 40 outlets in Australia in 10 years. In August 2015, Australia's first OldTown outlet was opened at Elizabeth St in Melbourne, but later closed in 2017.

=== China ===
As of 2015, OldTown has four café outlets in China.

=== Philippines ===
In 2023, Philippines opened its first branch in SM Grand Central in Caloocan City. Another branch opened in Circuit Makati in 2024.

== See also ==
- List of bakery cafés
- List of coffeehouse chains
- Ipoh white coffee
