= JAB Holding Company =

Luxembourg-based investment firm

JAB Holding Company S.à r.l.
- Type: Private
- Industry: Conglomerate
- Founded: 1828; 198 years ago
- Founders: Ludwig Reimann; Johann Benckiser
- Headquarters: Luxembourg City, Luxembourg
- Key people: Peter Harf (chairman); Olivier Goudet (CEO)
- Number of employees: 29 (2019)
- Parent: Agnaten SE
- Subsidiaries: Coty; JDE Peet's, Stumptown Coffee; Espresso House; Krispy Kreme; Panera Brands; Panera Bread; Einstein Bros. Bagels; Caribou Coffee; Bruegger's; Pret A Manger; Compassion-First Pet Hospitals; National Veterinary Associates; Independence Pet Holdings
- Website: jabholco.com

JAB Holding Company S.à r.l. (JAB or Joh. A. Benckiser) is a German conglomerate, headquartered in Luxembourg, that includes investments in companies operating in the areas of consumer goods, coffee, luxury fashion, animal health, and fast food, among others.

== Overview ==
As of 2015, JAB's portfolio included a minority stake in the consumer products company Reckitt Benckiser, and majority stakes in Coty, Peet's Coffee & Tea, Caribou Coffee Company, Jacobs Douwe Egberts (JDE), Einstein Noah Restaurant Group, and Jimmy Choo. As of that date, JAB also owned Bally, Belstaff, Zagliani, Espresso House, and Baresso Coffee.

In May 2014, D.E Master Blenders 1753 announced to acquire a majority stake in Mondelez's coffee business (outside of France) to form Jacobs Douwe Egberts, it would combine brands Jacobs, Carte Noire, Gevalia, Kenco, Tassimo and Millicano from Mondelez International and Douwe Egberts, L'OR, Pilao and Senseo from D.E Master Blenders.

In August 2014, under the Peet's Coffee & Tea brand, JAB acquired Mighty Leaf Tea, a specialty tea retailer based in the San Francisco Bay Area. In October 2015, Peet's Coffee & Tea acquired Portland, Oregon's Stumptown Coffee in a deal whose terms were not disclosed, and in the same month acquired a majority stake in Chicago-based Intelligentsia Coffee & Tea.

In March 2016, JAB and other investors acquired Keurig Green Mountain for $13.9 billion. In May 2016, JAB-controlled JAB Beech reached an agreement to acquire US doughnut shop operator Krispy Kreme for $1.35 billion. In April 2017, JAB reached an agreement to buy U.S.-based Panera Bread, a fast casual bakery-café chain, for $7.5 billion. Also in April, JAB was reported to be stepping back from investment in luxury goods, with reported plans to sell its stakes in the designer shoe and clothing brands Jimmy Choo, Bally, and Belstaff. In August 2017, JAB announced the acquisition of Bruegger's Bagels.

On 29 January 2018, Keurig Green Mountain announced it was acquiring Dr Pepper Snapple Group, with JAB owning 87% of the combined companies. As of February 2018, JAB retained ownership of a minority stake in Bally after sale of its majority stake to the Chinese conglomerate Shandong Ruyi. JAB's beverage empire was described in 2018 as having been built on "buy now, pay later" (extended terms of trade) principles; some coffee roasters owned by JAB are reported to require up to 300 days of financing from their suppliers.

In February 2019 the company spent $1.2 billion to acquire Compassion-First Pet Hospitals then purchased National Veterinary Associates four months later. The combined revenue of Compassion-First and National Veterinary Associates is expected to be $3 billion in 2020, placing it among the three largest players in the industry barely 12 months after the firm's first takeover.

In August 2024, JAB sold Swiss leather goods brand Bally to California-based private equity firm Regent, which owns and operates fashion brands such as Escada and Club Monaco, for an undisclosed sum.

== Ownership ==
Owned by Germany's Reimann family, 90% of JAB belongs to four of the nine adopted children of the late Albert Reimann Jr. (1898–1984). They trace their wealth to chemist Ludwig Reimann, who, in 1828, joined with Johann Adam Benckiser (founder of the namesake chemical company). Reimann married one of Benckiser's daughters and ended up owning the business. Great-grandson Albert Reimann Jr. took over after his father died in 1952 and added consumer goods.

Initially, each of the nine children had inherited 11.1% ownership in JAB upon Albert's death in 1984. In the following years, five of the heirs sold their stakes to the other four: Matthias Reimann-Andersen, Renate Reimann-Haas, Stefan Reimann-Andersen and Wolfgang Reimann. As of January 2015, each of the four owns about $3.8 billion in JAB shares.

The primary shareholder of JAB, as listed in its 2016 Consolidated Financial Statements, is Austrian-domiciled company Agnaten SE. Agnaten is listed, by PrivCo, as a subsidiary of Joh. A. Benckiser GmbH, the investment vehicle of the Reimann family.

== Founder's support of Hitler and Nazism ==
In March 2019, a German newspaper revealed that Albert Reimann Sr., and his son Albert Reimann Jr., were enthusiastic supporters of Adolf Hitler and the Nazi party well before they took power, and profited from forced labor, both in their industrial chemicals company in southern Germany and in their own home. The revelations sparked ethical questions about consumer support for companies that owe their success in part to the historical use of forced labor.

Two months later, several of the Reimanns revealed to The New York Times that their mother, Emilie Landecker, Albert Jr.'s mistress, baptized as a Catholic like her mother, was the daughter of Alfred Landecker, a Jewish man deported to the Izbica Ghetto in 1942. His ultimate fate is unknown although many Jews sent to Izbica were held there pending transport to the Belzec and Sobibor extermination camps. They have renamed the family foundation after him and doubled its budget to €25 million (US$28.2 million), to fund projects that honour the victims of the Holocaust and Nazism.

== See also ==
- List of companies involved in the Holocaust
