= Pickwick (brand) =

Dutch tea brand

- Type: Hot or cold beverage
- Origin: Netherlands
- Introduced: 1937
- Website: www.pickwick.nl

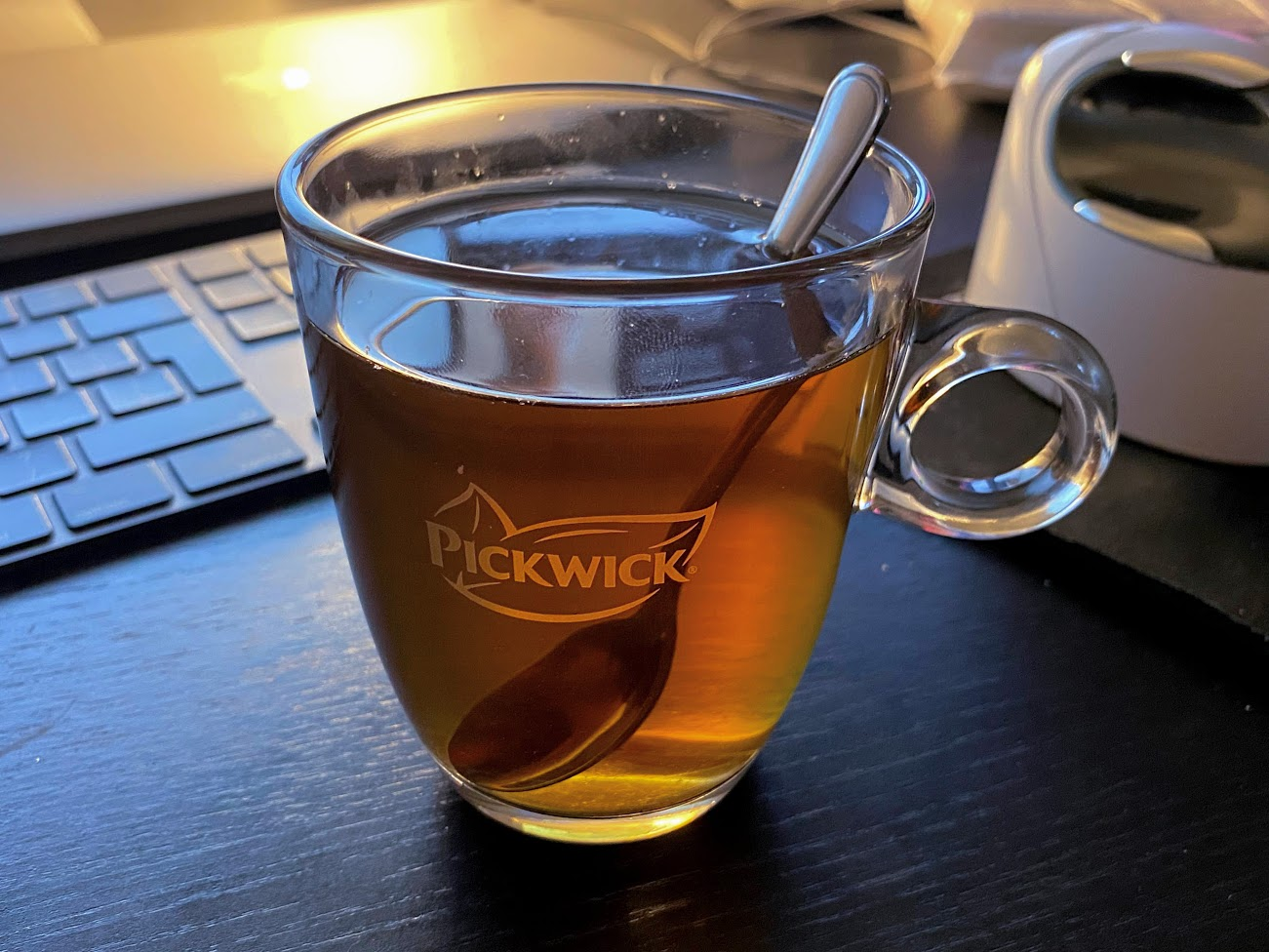
Pickwick tea in a branded promotion cup

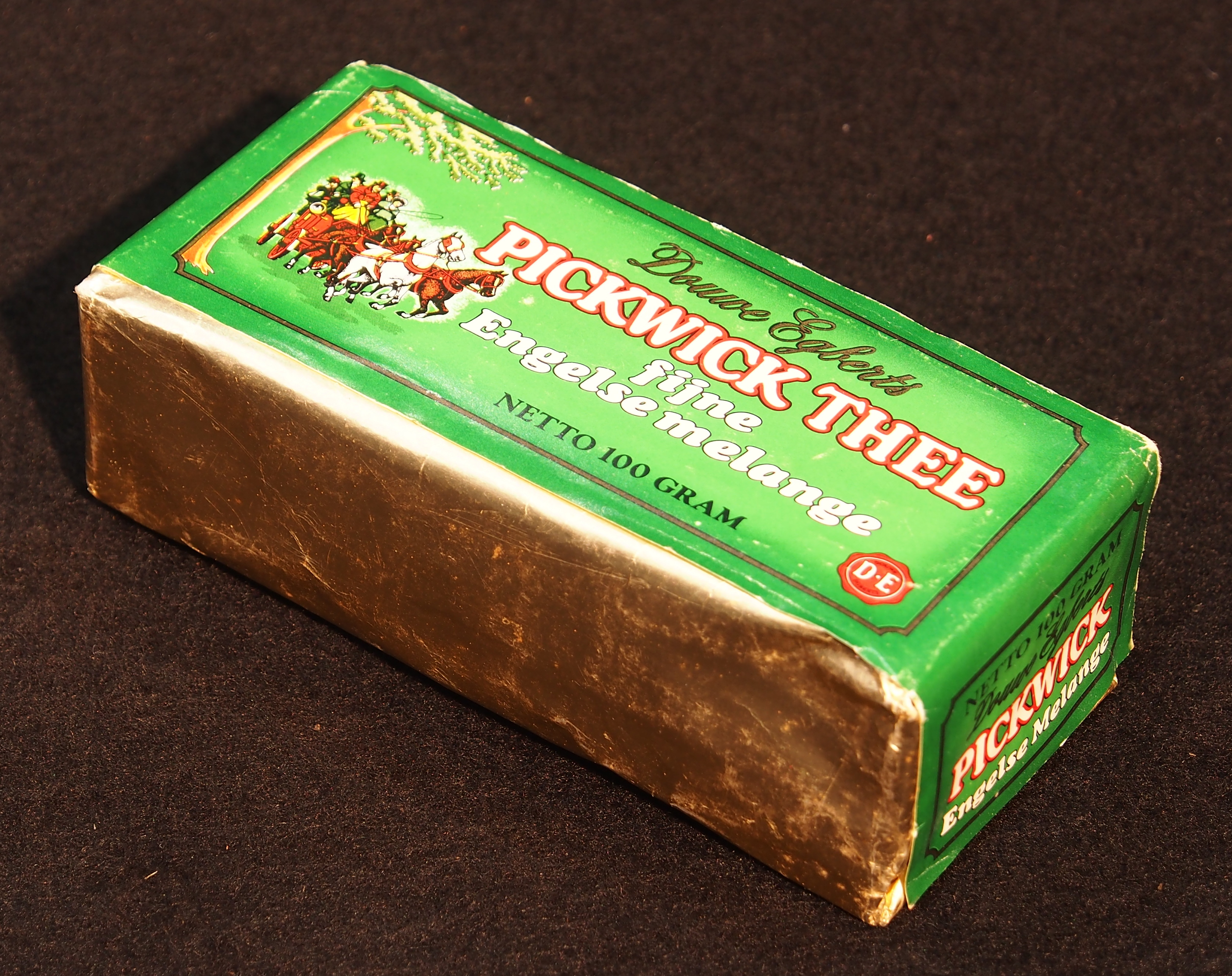
Former packaging of Pickwick tea

Pickwick is a tea brand, marketed by Dutch company JDE Peet's. It is the largest tea brand in the Netherlands and the country's leading brand in market share of black tea, although its share has been decreasing due to competition. As of 2014, it is also the leading tea brand in Denmark, with 27% of market share.

In 1753, Egbert Douwe and his wife, Akken, opened a coffee, tea, and tobacco kiosk on Main Street in Joure, Friesland. Until 1937, all the company's teas were produced under the Douwe Egberts brand; each box had an English postage stamp as a symbol.

In the 1930s, the company was headed by Johannes Hessel, whose wife loved to read Charles Dickens. Impressed by the novel about Mr. Pickwick's adventures, he suggested changing the name of the tea to "Pikvik". In any case, the legend of the brand change was translated from Dutch into "London" on the company's official website.

Traditional tea, fruit-flavored tea, herbal tea, green tea, rooibos-fruit mixture were produced under the "Pickwick" brand.

The name "Pickwick" is derived from the book The Pickwick Papers by Charles Dickens; it was proposed by the wife of then-director Johannes Hessel. Charles Dickens was a frequent visitor of the White Hart Inn, owned by Eleazer Pickwick. The fame of the White Hart Inn, and the name of Pickwick, remains immortalized in Dickens's book as well as the works of Jane Austen (e.g., Persuasion).

Pickwick tea is currently made in the tea factory on the grounds of JDE Peet (formerly Douwe Egberts) in Joure. There are several types of tea flavors including: forest fruits, lemon, orange, strawberry, cactus, melon, cherries, tropical fruits, southern fruits, mango, peach, cinnamon, vanilla, green tea, rooibos, easter tea flavors, traditional tea flavors, iced teas and separate teas.

== History ==
Douwe Egberts tea had been marketed under the company name since 1753, but in 1937 the name Pickwick was chosen by director Johannes Hessel's wife, who was inspired by Charles Dickens's Pickwick Papers. In the 1990s the brand was introduced to Central and Eastern Europe, and in 2015 to the United States in limited supply.

== Variations ==
Pickwick teas include black tea, green tea, white tea, flavoured teas, herbal teas and many others.
