= Mighty Leaf Tea =

American tea manufacturer

Mighty Leaf Tea Company
- Mighty Leaf Tea logo
- Company type: Subsidiary
- Industry: Beverage
- Founded: 1996
- Headquarters: Emeryville, CA
- Products: Teas & herbal teas
- Owner: JAB Holding Company
- Parent: JDE Peet's (2014–present)
- Website: Mighty Leaf Tea

The Mighty Leaf Tea Company is a specialty tea manufacturer and distributor based in Emeryville, California. It was founded in 1996 by Gary Shinner and Jill Portman.

In August 2014, Mighty Leaf Tea was acquired by Peet's Coffee & Tea, which is owned by JAB Holding Company.

Tasting Table ranked Mighty Leaf Tea second place in "15 Green Tea Brands, Ranked".
