= Peet's Coffee =

American specialty coffee roaster and retailer

- Type: Subsidiary
- Industry: Coffee shop
- Founded: 1966 (60 years ago); Berkeley, California, US
- Founder: Alfred Peet (1920–2007)
- Headquarters: Emeryville, California, US
- Number of locations: 200 (2021)
- Key people: Eric Lauterbach (president); Joris Knauf (chief financial officer); Doug Welsh (senior vice-president and roastmaster)
- Products: Coffee beans, coffee beverages, teas, and food
- Revenue: $983 million (FY 2019)
- Number of employees: 5,000
- Parent: JDE Peet's (JAB Holding Company) (2012–2025); Keurig Dr Pepper (2025-present)
- Subsidiaries: Stumptown Coffee Roasters; Intelligentsia Coffee & Tea; Mighty Leaf Tea
- Website: peets.com

Peet's Coffee is a San Francisco Bay Area-based specialty coffee roaster and retailer owned by Keurig Dr Pepper. Founded in 1966 by Alfred Peet in Berkeley, California, Peet's introduced the United States to its darker roasted Arabica coffee in blends including French roast and grades appropriate for espresso drinks. Peet's offers freshly roasted beans, brewed coffee and espresso beverages, as well as bottled cold brew. Peet's coffee is sold in over 14,000 grocery stores across the United States.

As of November 2021, the company had 200 stores in the United States.

== History ==
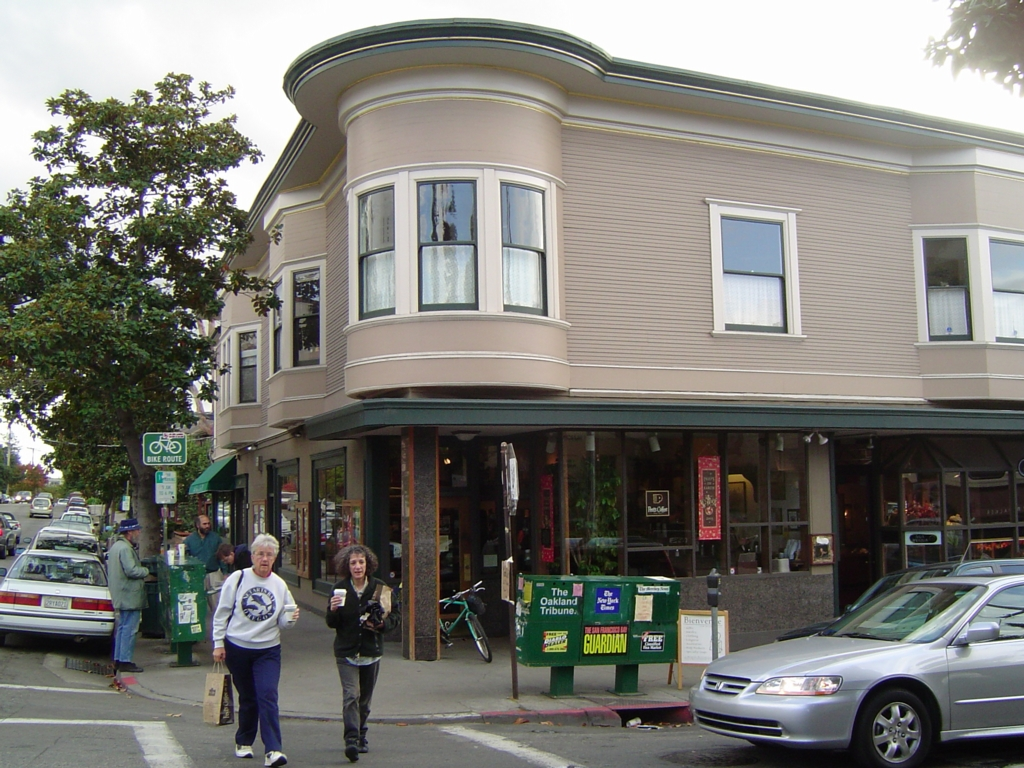
Peet's original store in North Berkeley, California

Alfred Peet (1920–2007) grew up in the Netherlands, where his father owned a coffee and tea business in Alkmaar, Holland. Peet trained with his father to roast and grind coffee. In 1938, at the age of 18, he moved to London where he was employed by Twinings coffee and tea company. He also spent time in New Zealand and Indonesia before moving to San Francisco in 1955 where he worked for a coffee and tea importer.

In 1966, Peet opened the first "Peet's Coffee, Tea & Spices" in Berkeley, California, on Vine Street near the University of California, Berkeley campus. It originally sold coffee beans, not cups of coffee. His coffee beans were hand-roasted in small batches. The company grew to four locations and became known as "Peet's Coffee and Tea." Peet wanted to bring better coffee to the American market and became known as "the grandfather of specialty coffee." The original location at Vine and Walnut remains open. The second location of Peet's Coffee was in Menlo Park, California.

Peet sold his business to Sal Bonavita in 1979, but remained working with the company as a coffee buyer and consultant until 1983. In 1984, Jerry Baldwin, a Starbucks founder, bought Peet's four locations from Sal Bonavita. In 1987, Baldwin and his Starbucks co-investors sold Starbucks to focus on Peet's. Howard Schultz, Starbucks' new owner, entered into a four-year non-compete agreement in the Bay Area.

In 2001, the company was incorporated as Peet's Coffee and Tea Company and had its initial public offering. The company was listed on the Nasdaq under the symbol PEET, and 3.3 million shares were sold at $8 a share. Shares climbed to $9.38 and the company raised $26.4 million.

Peet's opened a roasting plant in Alameda in 2007. This new location replaced the former operations in Emeryville, California.

In 2012, employees at a Peet's location in Chicago formed Peet's Worker's Group to address concerns about compensation, irregular scheduling, sick leave, and working conditions which resulted in frequent wrist injuries. Three representatives from Peet's corporate visited their store, where they attributed workers' complaints to the performance of manager of that location, and declined to discuss further concerns except in one-on-one meetings. The group subsequently lost momentum, and the lead organizer was fired after clocking in late for the third time in one year. Remaining members of Peet's Worker's Group attributed her firing to a selective enforcement of the company's lateness policy.

In 2012, Peet's was taken private when it was acquired by JAB Holding Company, a German investment group, for $977.6 million, or $73.50 per share. At that time, the acquisition was one of the largest prices paid for a Berkeley-founded company. JAB Holding (Joh. A Benckiser) also owns minority stakes in the consumer products companies Reckitt Benckiser, Coty and control of luxury brands Bally, Belstaff and Jimmy Choo. JAB Holding later acquired a portion of Caribou Coffee.

In August 2014, Peet's acquired Mighty Leaf Tea, a specialty tea brand based in the Bay Area, in partnership with Next World Group. It was announced in October 2015 that Stumptown Coffee Roasters would become a wholly owned subsidiary of Peet's. Later that same month, Peet's announced that it was acquiring a majority stake in Chicago-based Intelligentsia Coffee & Tea.

In 2015, Peet's Coffee merged with Jacobs Douwe Egberts, both majority-owned by JAB Holding, to form the Dutch multinational coffee and tea company JDE Peet's.

In December 2016, Peet's announced that it was building a second roaster in Suffolk, Virginia. The 175,000-square-foot facility will cost $58 million and was set to open in 2018. At that time, the Alameda roaster was producing approximately 1 million pounds of coffee each week. Peet's opened its first location in Shanghai, China, in October 2017.

As of fiscal year 2019, Peet's revenue grew to $983 million. On May 29, 2020, JDE Peet's raised $2.5 billion by taking the company public on the Euronext Amsterdam stock exchange in a deal that valued the company at $17.3 billion. Amidst the coronavirus pandemic and economic slowdown, it was the largest initial public offering in Europe during the first five months of 2020 and the second biggest IPO in the world.

In August 2025, it was announced Keurig Dr Pepper would purchase Peet's Coffee for $18.4 billion. The companies plan to split into two US-listed firms after the merger.

== Locations ==
As of 2025, Peet's operates over 250 retail locations in 13 states (Arizona, California, Colorado, Illinois, Maryland, Massachusetts, Nevada, New York, Oregon, Tennessee, Texas, Virginia, and Washington) and the District of Columbia. In 2018, Peet's expanded to China, opening a location in Shanghai.

Peet's formerly operated in Pennsylvania, Ohio, and Michigan, but Peet's shuttered these stores in 2014 to focus on the areas where it is growing.

By December 2016, Peet's coffee was sold in 14,000 grocery stores, universities, and wholesalers across the United States. They had over a dozen coffeebar locations in Chicago and Boston as well as 23 in the Washington D.C. area at that time.

== Unionization ==
On November 28, 2022, workers at the Downtown Davis and North Davis locations in California filed petitions to hold union elections to join the Service Employees International Union. A week before the election, however, the Downtown location withdrew its petition. Those who worked downtown would receive a $500 taxable bonus from the company. On January 20, 2023, workers at the North Davis location voted 14–1 to join SEIU Local 1021 and became the coffee chain's first union shop in the United States.

In June 2023, workers at the Southside Berkeley, Temescal and Piedmont locations in California filed petitions to hold union elections in an attempt to join the Industrial Workers of the World IU 460 chapter. In July 2023, workers at all of these locations voted in favor of union representation. Votes were unanimous in favor of union representation at Southside Berkeley and Temescal, and 8–7 in favor at Piedmont.

In August 2024, workers at the 1776 4th Street location in Berkeley, California, voted 12–3 in favor of union representation with the Industrial Workers of the World. In October 2024, workers at 1441 NE Broadway St. in Portland, Oregon, voted 11–0 in favor of union representation with the Industrial Workers of the World, becoming the first Peet's union shop outside of California.

Workers across these locations cited low pay, poor scheduling, and unsafe working conditions as the reasons for their unionization. In response, Peet's management has paid over $125,000 to outside consultants tasked with influencing union certification votes.

== Licensed partnerships ==
Peet's has outlets at many transit centers, including several airports.

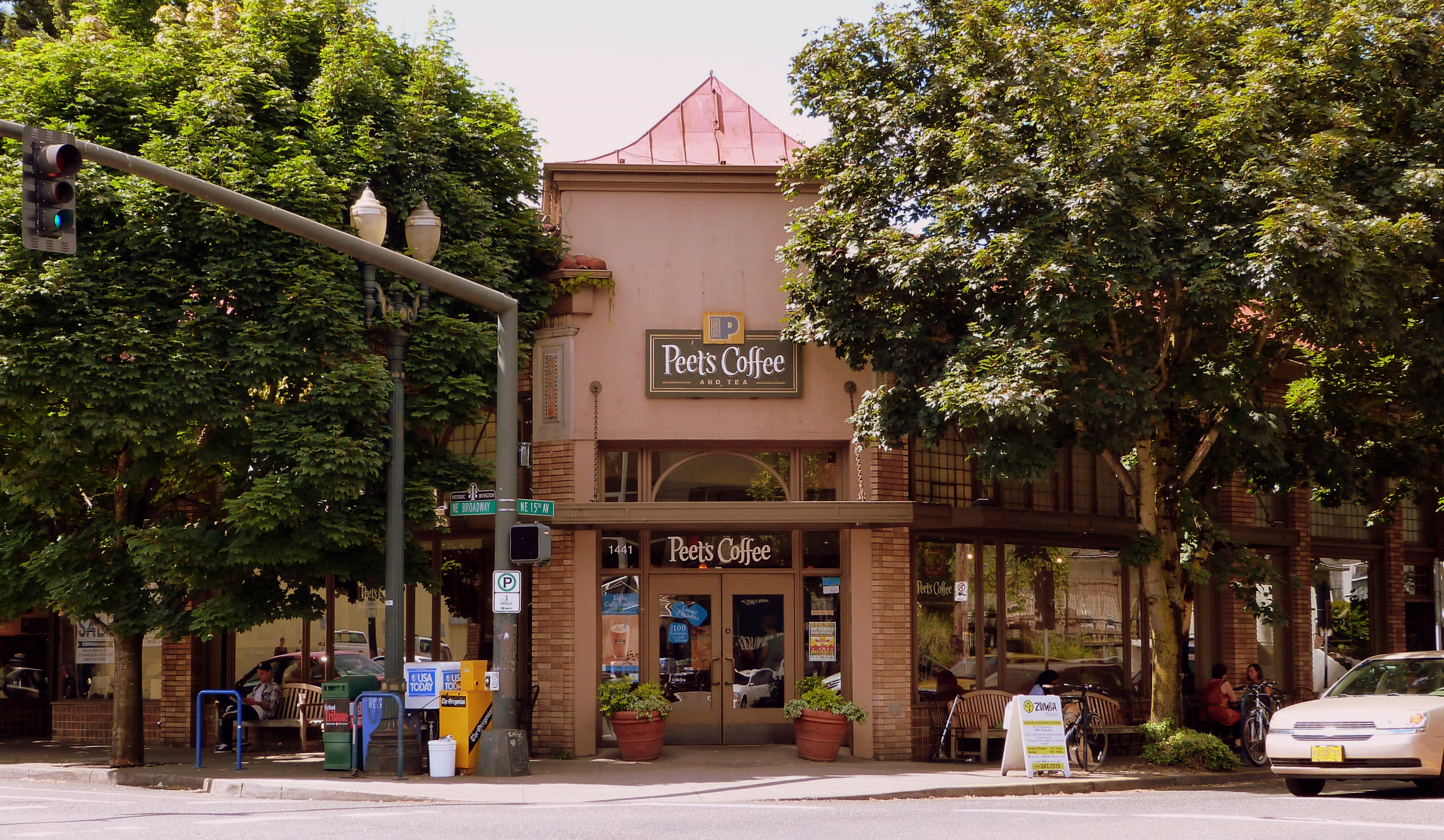
Peet's in Northeast Portland, Oregon

In 2003, the first full-service Peet's coffeebar on a university campus was opened within the Clark Center building at Stanford University. Peet's coffee is also currently served at all Stanford dining locations. In 2005, UC Berkeley opened its own Peet's franchise on campus in Dwinelle Hall and as a campus restaurant near its existing dining area. Similarly in 2009, coffeebars opened at the UW–Madison's Memorial Union, Villanova University and UC San Diego.

Peet's donated $250,000 to the University of California, Davis, to launch Coffee Center, a research hub dedicated to a multidisciplinary study of coffee, in September 2016. UC Davis is the first university in the world to dedicate a rigorous academic focus to post-harvest coffee. The program worked with the Specialty Coffee Association of America to get prospective graduates access to grants and fellowships. In April 2017, Peet's signed an agreement with UC Berkeley's University Partnership Program to help fund student programs including student travel grants, scholarships, and paid internship opportunities.

== Products ==
In September 2015, Peet's announced that it was adding all-day breakfast options to its menu. The change would be implemented in the Chicago market, and eventually, would be added at all locations.

Peet's Coffee started formulating its cold brew blend in 2014, adding it to its coffeebar menu in the summer of 2015. In July 2016, Peet's released a line of bottled cold brew coffee to 400 locations in the San Francisco area including Peet's coffeebars and grocery stores. Peet's coldbrew was initially offered in three flavors: Baridi Black, Coffee au Lait, and Dark Chocolate. Almond Milk was added to the line of bottled cold brew in May 2017.

In December 2016, Peet's added a Slow Bar to its newest D.C. coffeebar, featuring French press, pour-over, and siphon brewing methods.

In March 2025, the company announced that as of June, it would no longer upcharge for plant-based milk additions to their drinks.

== Influence ==
When the three founders of Starbucks were looking to start their company, they contacted Peet, who "became like a father mentor" to them. He allowed the three young men to copy the layout of his store and shared his suppliers.

Peet's has a devoted following, sometimes known as "Peetniks", a portmanteau of Peets and beatniks.

Peet's was one of the first coffee bean and brewed coffee retailers to offer specialty grade coffee, and to roast the beans longer, producing a liquor that is darker, more bitter, with less of the sour taste of the coffees offered in the US at the time. Peet's is commonly regarded as one of the founding businesses in the gourmet coffee trade.

Two British men who worked at Peet's in the early 1990s later established Union Coffee Roasters in the United Kingdom.

== See also ==
- List of coffeehouse chains
