= Gordon Bowker =

American businessman (1942–2025)

- Born: October 28, 1942; Alameda, California, U.S.
- Died: August 21, 2025 (aged 82); Seattle, Washington, U.S.
- Education: University of San Francisco (dropped out)
- Occupations: Food and beverage company entrepreneur, former scriptwriter, former magazine writer
- Known for: Co-founder of Starbucks Coffee Company; Co-owner and director of Peet's Coffee and Tea; Co-founder of Redhook Ale Brewery

Gordon Albert Bowker (October 29, 1942 – August 21, 2025) was an American businessman who began his career as a writer and later co-founded Starbucks with Jerry Baldwin and Zev Siegl. He was later a co-owner of Peet's Coffee & Tea and Redhook Ale Brewery.

== Life and career ==
Following his father's death in World War II, Bowker was raised by his mother, Hazel Ringseth Bowker (1915–1991), in Ballard and Burien, Washington. His maternal grandparents were Norwegian immigrants who took part in the Alaskan Gold Rush. He graduated from O'Dea High School in Seattle. From 1960 to 1965, Bowker attended the University of San Francisco, where he was roommates with Baldwin. Bowker dropped out eight credits away from graduation.

In 1968, Bowker wrote educational film scripts for a division of King Broadcasting while making freelance contributions for Seattle magazine. He met Terry Heckler there, and the pair formed the advertising agency Heckler Bowker. Bowker met David Brewster at the magazine, years later funding the launch of Brewster's Seattle Weekly and writing restaurant and hospitality reviews under the pen name Lars Henry Ringseth.

In 1971, Bowker, Baldwin and Siegl opened the first Starbucks near Pike Place Market. In 1984, Starbucks acquired Peet's Coffee & Tea. In 1987, Bowker and Baldwin sold Starbucks to Howard Schultz and a group of investors. Bowker then left the coffee business, but was later on Peet's board of directors from 1994 to 2008.

Bowker died of bone marrow disease on August 21, 2025, at the age of 82.
