= Alfred Peet =

Dutch-American businessman

- Peet in the late 1960s at the original Peet's location
- Born: March 10, 1920; Alkmaar, Netherlands
- Died: August 29, 2007 (aged 87); Ashland, Oregon, U.S.
- Occupation: Founder of Peet's Coffee & Tea

Alfred H. Peet (March 10, 1920 – August 29, 2007) was a Dutch-American entrepreneur and the founder of Peet's Coffee & Tea in Berkeley, California, in 1966. Peet is widely credited with starting the specialty coffee revolution in the US. Among coffee historians, Peet has been called "the Dutchman who taught America how to drink coffee." Peet taught his style of roasting beans to Jerry Baldwin, Zev Siegl and Gordon Bowker, who, with his blessing, took the technique to Seattle and founded Starbucks in 1971. Peet later distanced himself, however, from the Starbucks trio as they experimented with ultra-dark roasts. "Baldwin never learned anything from me," Peet was later quoted as saying.

== Life and career ==
Peet was born in Alkmaar, Netherlands, where his father ran a small coffee roasting establishment, prior to World War II. Following the war; Peet left London, where he had apprenticed with Twinings coffee and tea company, to work as a tea taster in the Dutch East Indies and New Zealand, prior to emigrating to San Francisco, California, in 1955, where he worked in the coffee importing industry.

Dismayed with the poor quality of coffee in the United States, Peet opened a coffee store in Berkeley, California, on 1 April 1966. He compared the low quality coffee in the United States to World War II "rationed" coffee.

Although often encouraged to expand the business, he remained stalwart in keeping the original location at Walnut and Vine, zealously guarding the quality of the coffee bearing his name. After several years of roasting beans in the back of the store using one-, and then five-pound, roasters, in the early 1970s, he acquired a 5,000 square feet (460 m^{2}) warehouse in the adjacent town of Emeryville, in which he installed a 100-pound roaster, followed by a 300-pound roaster, in 1976. By that time, Peet had two additional retail stores: one on Piedmont in Oakland, and one on Santa Cruz Avenue in Menlo Park. He then also sold roasted-to-order, 20 to 50 pound bags of beans to restaurants throughout the Bay Area.

== Retirement ==
Peet sold his business in 1979 to Sal Bonavita, for whom he remained a mentor for the next five years. Bonavita soon opened new stores in Oakland, Mill Valley and Menlo Park. In 1984, Jerry Baldwin led Starbucks in acquiring Peet's four locations from Bonavita. After retiring from the coffee business, Peet moved in 2001 to Ashland, Oregon where he died on August 29, 2007 at age 87.

== Influence on coffee industry ==
Peet introduced custom coffee roasting of top quality beans to the United States, at a time when Americans were typically drinking coffee brewed from beans vacuum packed in a can.

The origin of Berkeley's Gourmet Ghetto was Peet's first Peet's Coffee location, opened in 1966, at the corner of Walnut and Vine; the area grew around Peet's and adjacent specialty food, health food, and other avant-garde restaurants that sprung up, including Chez Panisse.

While Peet was known to have a "stern demeanor", he also had a genuine willingness to instruct coffee entrepreneurs in the art of bean roasting. Starbucks co-founder Jerry Baldwin has remembered Peet as a "very generous" mentor. And Baldwin was one of many coffee entrepreneurs that Peet mentored, including Jamie Anderson (Anderson's Coffee, Austin, Texas), David Dessinger (Pegasus Coffee, Bainbridge Island, Washington), Arnold Spinelli (LaCoppa Coffee Company, San Francisco, California), John Weaver (Weaver's Coffee & Tea) Susan Ohori (Ohori's Coffee Roasters, Santa Fe, New Mexico) and Leigh McDonald (founder of Coffee Connection in Amsterdam).

Other coffee entrepreneurs got into the business simply because they were inspired by Alfred Peet and their experience tasting his coffee at his first Berkeley store. George Howell is a notable example, who founded The Coffee Connection in the Boston, Massachusetts area. Howell is widely credited as having been the inventor of the Frappuccino. Starbucks later acquired his business.

== Media ==
An interview with Alfred Peet is included in the documentary Coffee Culture USA by Kenneth van Schooten and Julie Ragusa, released in 2008.

Peet's sister, then aged 100, was interviewed by Dutch editor and author Jasper Houtman, for The Coffee Visionary: The Life & Legacy of Alfred Peet, published in 2018.

== See also ==
- Gourmet Ghetto
