= Sheldon Friel =

Irish orthodontist

Ernest Sheldon Friel
- Born: 1888; Waterford, Ireland.
- Died: 2 February 1970 (aged 81–82); Dublin, Ireland
- Education: Trinity College, Dublin, Ireland
- Years active: 1909–1970
- Medical career
- Profession: Dentist
- Sub-specialties: Orthodontics
- Research: Occlusion
- Awards: Villain Prize in Orthodontics; Albert H. Ketcham Award in Orthodontics

Ernest Sheldon Friel (1888 – 2 February 1970), was an Irish dentist who was the first specialist orthodontist to practise in the United Kingdom of Great Britain and Ireland, and the second in Europe, going on to become the first Professor of Orthodontics in Europe. His obituary in The Journal of the Irish Dental Association described him as the most distinguished dentist that Ireland had ever produced.

== Academic and clinical career ==
Friel studied at Trinity College, Dublin, graduating in 1908 and receiving a master's degree in dental science in 1909. During this period he also undertook specialist orthodontic studies under the father of modern orthodontics, Edward Angle, in the United States. In 1909 he established an orthodontic practice in Dublin, the first in the British Isles. In 1910 he was appointed as Lecturer in Orthodontics at Trinity, receiving a Doctor of Science degree in 1928. In 1941 the college created the first professorship in orthodontics in Europe and appointed Friel to the position. For many years following this he was the only professor of orthodontics in the British Isles.

Friel was a pioneer in the use of stainless steel, rather than the previously preferred gold, for the manufacture of orthodontic devices. Other research interests were muscle testing and training, the relation of function to the size and form of jaws, the migration of teeth and occlusion.

== Professional societies ==
Friel was a founder member of the British Society for the Study of Orthodontics and was prominent in the society in its early years, acting as its president in 1924. He was president of the Irish Dental Association in 1932, of the European Orthodontic Society from 1935 to 1937, and of the Odontological Section of the Royal Society of Medicine in 1949.

In 1945 Friel undertook a campaign in the profession for the greater specialisation of orthodontics in Britain at a time when much treatment was undertaken by non-specialist dentists.

== Awards and fellowships ==
In 1948 Friel was awarded a Fellowship of the Royal College of Surgeons of England, and in 1951 of the Royal College of Surgeons of Edinburgh. He received the Villain Prize in orthodontics from the Fédération Dentaire Internationale in 1957, and in 1960 he became the first person outside North America to receive the Ketcham Award from the American Board of Orthodontics. In 1962 he was elected an honorary fellow of Trinity College Dublin.

== Legacy ==
Three years after Friel's death his family provided funding to the European Orthodontic Society for the annual Sheldon Friel Memorial Lecture.
