= Einar Friele =

Norwegian businessman (1901–1944)

Einar B. Friele (26 October 1901 – 19 February 1944) was a Norwegian businessperson and resistance member.

He was born in Bergen as a son of Berent Friele (1862–1902) and Dagny Stockfleth Høegh Beyer (1869–1963). He was a brother of Berent Johan Beyer Friele, grandson of Herman Friele and Fredrik Beyer, and first cousin of Harald Beyer. He was married twice, and had two children from his first marriage.

His family's company Berent Friele & Sønner was a mainstay in Bergen commerce, founded in 1799. After attending commerce school and undergoing managerial training in the US, France and Germany, Einar Friele joined the family company in 1925. He worked as a junior executive before the Second World War. He also chaired the wholesalers' association Kolonialgrossisternes forening in Bergen and was a national board member of Norges Colonialgrossisters Forbund.

In 1940, following the German invasion of Norway, Friele participated in the subsequent fighting to repel the invaders. This was unsuccessful and the occupation of Norway by Nazi Germany was established; Friele joined an illegal intelligence gathering organization in the autumn of 1940. In August 1942 he was discovered and arrested. He was incarcerated in Grini concentration camp until September 1943, when he was shipped to the Nacht und Nebel system in Germany. He died in February 1944 in Natzweiler.
