= Freels =

Freels may refer to:

== Places ==
- Cape Freels, a headland on the island of Newfoundland, Canada
- Freels Farm Mounds, an archaeological site in Tennessee, United States

== People ==
- Katy Freels (born 1990), American soccer midfielder

== See also ==
- Freel
- Friels
