= Honey dill =

Condiment

Honey dill sauce
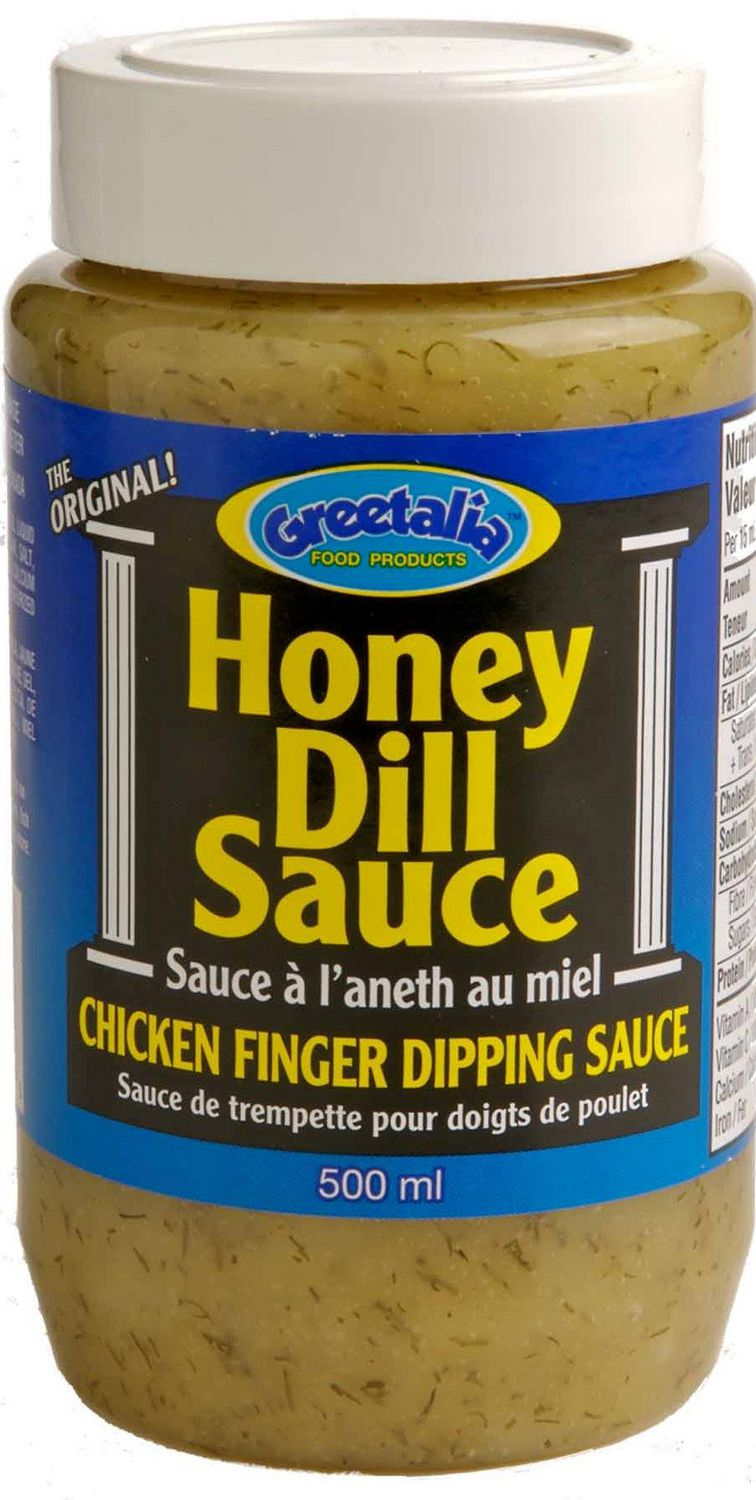
- Bottled Greetalia Honey Dill Sauce
- Type: Sauce
- Place of origin: Canada
- Region or state: Winnipeg, Manitoba
- Main ingredients: Mayonnaise, honey, and dried dill.

Honey dill or honey dill sauce is a condiment consisting of honey, mayonnaise, and dried dill that is unique to Manitoba, Canada. It is often used as a dipping sauce for chicken fingers as well as for sweet potato fries. The sauce was mistakenly invented at Mitzi's Chicken Finger Restaurant in downtown Winnipeg. The restaurant specialized in chicken fingers, the meal for which the sauce is mostly used. Its owner tried to copy a recipe by taste from another restaurant, but got the recipe wrong. The accidental sauce was so popular at the restaurant, that it took off locally in the province. President's Choice marketed a brand nationally, however, sales outside Manitoba were too slow. Today, most production is done by a local Winnipeg producer, or in-house at restaurants.
