= James Halstead =

James Halstead plc
- Company type: Public
- Traded as: LSE: JHD; FTSE AIM UK 50 component
- ISIN: GB00B0LS8535
- Industry: Flooring; Textile
- Founded: 1915
- Headquarters: Radcliffe, Manchester
- Brands: Polyflor
- Website: jameshalstead.com

James Halstead plc is a United Kingdom-based manufacturer and distributor of commercial flooring products. Its head office is located in Radcliffe, Manchester.

== History ==
James Halstead established the business as a manufacturer of waterproof cotton textiles and rubberised fabrics in 1915. The flooring market was entered in the 1930s. It was registered as a public company in 1948.

Polyflor was introduced in the late 1940s. It represented a new type of plastic flooring, combining PVC, limestone and a plasticiser. By the late 1980s James Halstead had transitioned to become a specialist floor covering manufacturer.

Belstaff, the British outerwear clothing brand which was acquired back in 1948, was sold to Italian businessman Franco Malenotti for £10 million in 2004.
