= Belstaff =

British clothing company

- Industry: Clothing
- Founded: 1924 in Longton, Stoke-on-Trent, Staffordshire, England
- Founder: Eli Belovitch; Harry Grosberg
- Headquarters: London, England
- Area served: Worldwide
- Parent: Castore (2025-); Ineos (2017-2025); JAB / Labelux Group (2011-2017); James Halstead (1948-2004)
- Website: www.belstaff.com

Belstaff is an English clothing company founded in 1924. Belstaff pioneered the use of wax cotton in the manufacturing of waterproof apparel for motorcycling. It was co-founded by Eli Belovitch and his son-in-law Harry Grosberg in Longton, Stoke-on-Trent, Staffordshire. "Belstaff" is a portmanteau combination of "Belovitch" and "Staffordshire".

== History ==
Belstaff was founded in 1924 by Eli Belovitch and his son-in-law Harry Grosberg in Longton, Stoke-on-Trent, Staffordshire. In 1948, Belstaff became a subsidiary of James Halstead. The company was affected by the textile crisis of the 1990s, precipitating the closure of the Longton factory after previously closing its Silverdale site. James Halstead continued to own the brand selling the Belstaff motorcycle range and helmet brands until 2004. Alongside this, they promoted the fashion side across Europe, Australia, and the US. The brand was sold in 2004 to Franco Malenotti of Sponsor SA Italy. Kate Moss was paid £1,000,000 to appear in Belstaff ads.

In June 2011, Harry Slatkin and The Labelux Group bought Belstaff. Slatkin assumed the CEO role and appointed Martin Cooper as Chief Creative Officer, and together, they planned to reposition Belstaff as an English heritage brand centred on luxury sportswear. Tommy Hilfiger was brought in as a business consultant.

In 2012, the company opened stores in Via Della Spiga Milan, New Bond Street, London and Madison Avenue, New York City.

60 percent of the clothing was produced in Italy, and the remainder across Europe.

In July 2014, along with Jimmy Choo and Bally, Belstaff was transferred to JAB Holdings following Labelux Group's dissolution. In 2015, Belstaff produced a 17-minute commercial, Outlaws, with appearances by David Beckham, Harvey Keitel, Katherine Waterston and Cathy Moriarty. In early 2016, Belstaff made a 3-minute commercial, Falling Up, in which Liv Tyler retraces the footsteps of 1920s aviator Amelia Earhart. Delphine Ninous became Creative Director in July 2016.

In 2017, Belstaff opened a store in Ginza Six, Tokyo. The same year it was bought by Ineos, owned by Jim Ratcliffe.

In January 2018, Helen Wright was appointed CEO of the company, and in May the change also involved the creative direction with Sean Lehnhardt-Moore taking over from Delphine Ninous. Fran Millar was appointed CEO in 2020, leaving her position at the UCI World Tour cycling team, the Ineos Grenadiers.

In 2019, Belstaff closed its Madison Avenue store, and in 2020 opened a store in the Meatpacking District.

Having made a profit loss every year since the Ineos acquisition, the company was sold to Castore in August 2025.
