= Friele =

Norwegian coffee company

Kaffehuset Friele AS

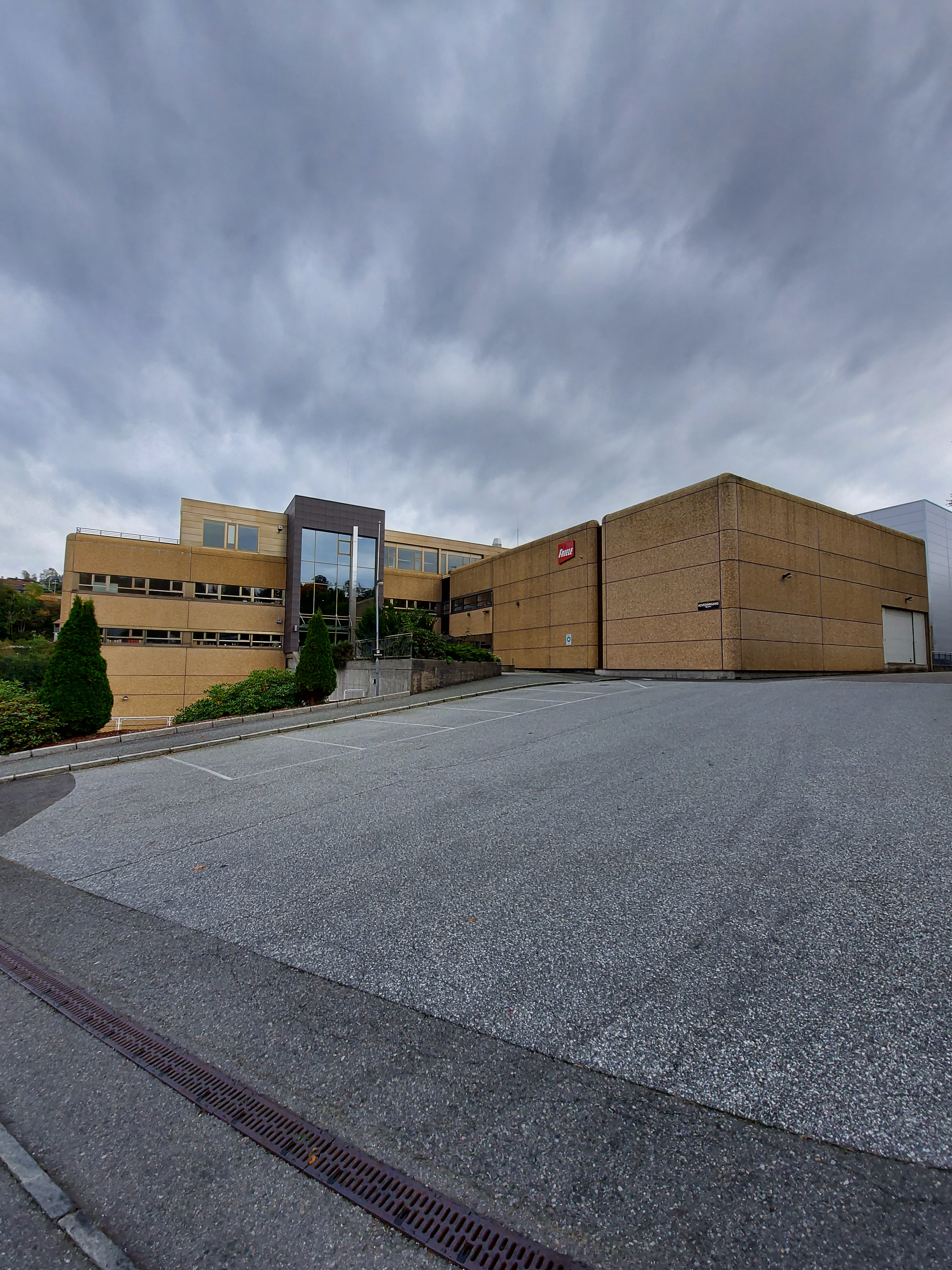
- Headquarters of Friele in Bergen
- Type: Subsidiary
- Industry: Coffee
- Founded: 1799
- Headquarters: Bergen, Norway
- Area served: Norway
- Parent: JDE Peet's
- Website: www.friele.no

Friele (Kaffehuset Friele; Norwegian: [ˈfɾiːlə]) is a Norwegian coffee manufacturer and brand based in Midtun, a commercial and residential district of the borough of Fana in Bergen, Norway. Friele is the largest producer of coffee in Norway. It is part of JDE Peet's.

== Company history ==
The company was started in 1799 when ship captain Herman Friele (1763–1843) landed in Bergen to start trading. He bought a property in Bergen and established an import business with emphasis on coffee. Towards the middle of the 19th century, coffee consumption was growing due to falling prices from increased global production. Herman Friele ran the company until his retirement in 1835, when his youngest son Berent Friele (1810–1897) took over. In 1862, he took two partners on board; his son Herman Friele (1838–1921) and son-in-law Alexander B. Grieg. The company name was also changed to B. Friele & Sønner. Friele and Grieg owned the company together until 1897, when Grieg left and Friele's son Berent Friele (1862–1902) became partner. In 1900, the older Friele took another son Herman (1877–1961) on board as partner, and retired himself. When Berent died in 1902, Herman became the sole owner and remained so for many years. Berent's son Einar Friele became junior executive in 1925, but was killed during World War II.

Friele was owned by the seventh generation and chairman Herman Friele until the sale of the company to DE Master Blenders 1753 in 2013. Friele buys its coffee beans from 9–10 different countries, mainly from Brazil and Kenya. Until the mid-1980s most of the coffee was sold in Western and Northern Norway, but since it has expanded throughout the country. The present plant was constructed in 1981.

== See also ==
- List of oldest companies
