= Jerry Baldwin =

American businessman and winemaker

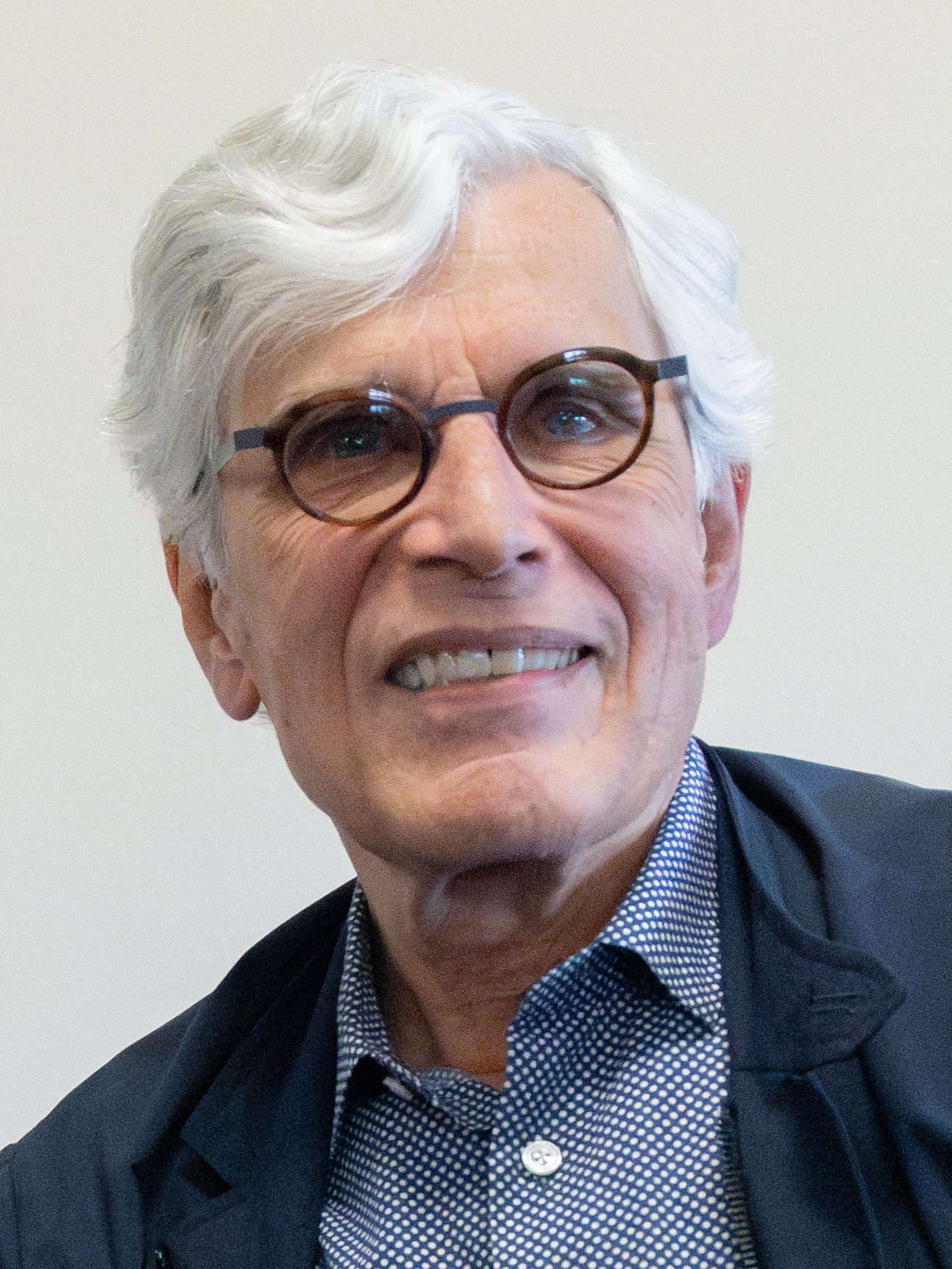
- Baldwin in 2024
- Born: Gerald Baldwin
- Education: University of San Francisco
- Occupations: Food and beverage company founder, company chairman.
- Known for: Co-founded Starbucks coffee chain

Gerald Baldwin is an American businessman. He and two other entrepreneurs, Gordon Bowker and Zev Siegl, founded Starbucks in Seattle, in 1971. He is a Sonoma Valley vintner, and co-founder of J. Baldwin Wines.

== Career ==
Jerry Baldwin was born to Rowland Baldwin (1914–1989), a door-to-door milkman, and Patricia Brodeur Baldwin (1923–2019), who worked in data processing for the federal government and IBM, found his life unsettled as a teenager when his parents divorced and his mother remarried. Baldwin went to 3 different high schools before enrolling at the University of San Francisco. He learned the coffee trade from Alfred Peet, whose store Peet's Coffee And Tea was the inspiration for Starbucks. Starbucks purchased roasted coffee beans from Peet's during its first year of operation. Baldwin has recalled Peet as being a "very generous" mentor. In 1984, when Peet's was offered for sale, Baldwin led a group of investors, including Bowker, to purchase the company. In 1987, he sold his interests in Starbucks to Howard Schultz and other investors. Baldwin was chairman of Peet's until 2001 when Peet's went public, and he became a director of the company.

Baldwin served as director and founding chairman of the Technical Standards Committee of the Specialty Coffee Association of America; president of Association Scientifique Internationale pour le Café (ASIC); and chairman of the Coffee Quality Institute. He was honored with a Lifetime Achievement Award by Specialty Coffee Association of America. He is a director of TechnoServe, an NGO working in Latin America and Africa.

In 2000, he and his wife, photographer Jane Baldwin, established J. Baldwin Wines, a zinfandel and petite sirah grower and producer located in Sonoma Valley, California.
