= Daniel Aegerter =

Swiss businessman and venture capitalist

Daniel Simon Aegerter
- Born: Daniel Simon Aegerter; July 20, 1969 (age 57); Bern, Switzerland
- Occupation: Chairman of Armada Investment Group
- Known for: Founder of Tradex Technologies; Billionaire on paper during the dot-com bubble

Daniel Simon Aegerter (born July 20, 1969) is a Swiss businessman and venture capitalist. Formerly CEO of Tradex Technologies, he later founded the family office Armada Investment, to manage his wealth. He was an early investor in investment management company Nutmeg (now JP Morgan Personal Investing), N26, Lilium GmbH, and Commonwealth Fusion Systems. As of 2025, his net worth is CHF 750 million, according to Bilanz.

== Early life ==
Daniel Aegerter was born in Bern, Switzerland. His father, Simon, is a physicist and the founder of the Swiss Science Center Technorama. His mother, Irene, is also a physicist and a former member of the Swiss Commission for Nuclear Safety.

== Career ==
At the age of 18, Aegerter founded his first company, Megabyte.

In 1988, at the age of 19, Aegerter founded Dynabit, an importer and distributor of Apple Macintosh peripherals, particularly for those used in electronic publishing. At that time, he was working as an intern for Swiss Bank Corporation. He received a loan of 250,000 Swiss francs from Zug Cantonal Bank.

In 1990, he moved to Tampa (Florida) with his wife to start a computer trading business. In 1996, he founded Tradex Technologies as an Internet-based system for automating the purchase of computer equipment distributed by Dynabit.

In December 1999, SAP Ariba agreed to acquire the company for $1.9 billion in stock. By the time the deal closed in March 2000, the stock was worth $5.6 billion and Aegerter was a billionaire on paper. After the dot-com bubble burst, Aegarter's fortune dwindled to 500 million Swiss francs.

Aegerter was a member of the Board of Directors of euNetworks from 2010 to 2018 and of Nutmeg (company) from 2012 to 2019. He funded Emergency Reactor co-founded by activist Zion Lights and Robert Stone.

In February 2017, Aegerter and other investors invested a total of USD 4.5 million in the startup Transatomic Power. He is also an investor in Oklo, designer of the Aurora nuclear reactor.

Aegerter is a member of World Minds.

In 2020, Aegerter was one of the producers for the Emmy nominated series "Chasing the Moon", which was nominated for a Creative Arts Emmy.

=== Armada Investment ===
In 2000, he formed Armada Investment, a family office to manage his wealth. He capitalized the company with $120 million.

Aegerter's investment firm "Armada VC" invested a total of $3 million in Flytrex in January 2017, along with several angel investors, to enable drone deliveries.

Armada Investment participated in a collection campaign of the German pension platform Xpension in April 2020. A total of 25 million EUR was raised. In October 2020, Armada Investment supported the Swiss startup Lykke, which was close to approval as a securities trader and organized trading facility.

== Personal life ==
Aegerter is married and has 2 sons. He owns a $12 million mansion in Zumikon.

Aegerter is an avid polo player. In July 2019, the "Medium Goal" polo tournament, both founded and sponsored by Daniel Aegerter, took place for the 14th time.
