= Keith J. Krach =

American businessman and government employee (born 1957)

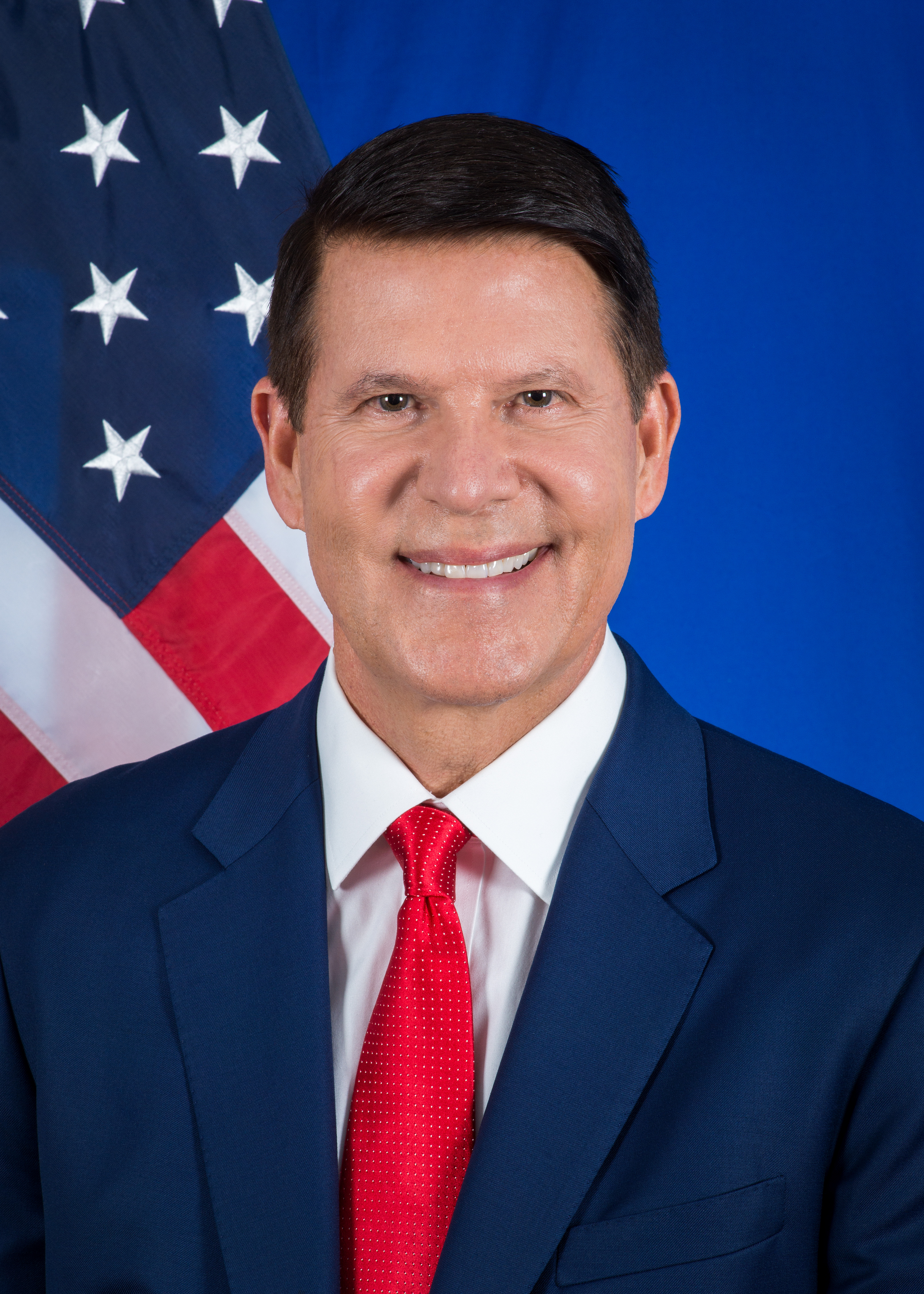

20th Under Secretary of State for Economic Growth, Energy, and the Environment
- In office June 21, 2019 – January 20, 2021
- President: Donald Trump
- Preceded by: Catherine A. Novelli
- Succeeded by: Jose W. Fernandez

Personal details
- Born: April 1, 1957 (age 69) Lakewood, Ohio, U.S.
- Children: 5
- Parents: John Krach; Elda Krach
- Education: Purdue University (BS); Harvard University (MBA)
- Occupation: Businessman
- Website: keithkrach.com

Keith Joseph Krach (born April 1, 1957) is an American businessman and former diplomat. He is the former chairman and CEO of DocuSign. Krach co-founded Ariba, and was chairman and CEO, and is recognized for his work in B2B Commerce and Digital Transaction Management. Krach was chairman of the board of Angie's List. Krach was the youngest-ever Vice President of General Motors. He was Chairman of the board of Trustees for Purdue University.

On June 20, 2019, he was confirmed by the Senate to become under secretary of state for economic growth, energy, and the environment in the Trump administration. He was succeeded by acting senior official Marcia Bernicat in 2021.

== Early life and education ==
Krach was born in Lakewood, Ohio, to Elda and John Krach and was raised in the small town of Rocky River, Ohio.

At the age of 12, Krach worked as a welder in his father's machine shop, an experience which inspired him to pursue a B.S. in industrial engineering from Purdue University. During his sophomore year (1977), Krach received one of two General Motors scholarships awarded to Purdue engineering students. The scholarship paid for tuition, books, a living stipend, summer jobs with the automaker, and a full-time position with the company in Detroit following graduation.

After graduating from Purdue in 1979, Krach received a fellowship from General Motors to study for an M.B.A. from Harvard University Business School. Upon completion of his master's degree in 1981, he joined GM full time.

== Business career ==
=== GM and other ventures ===
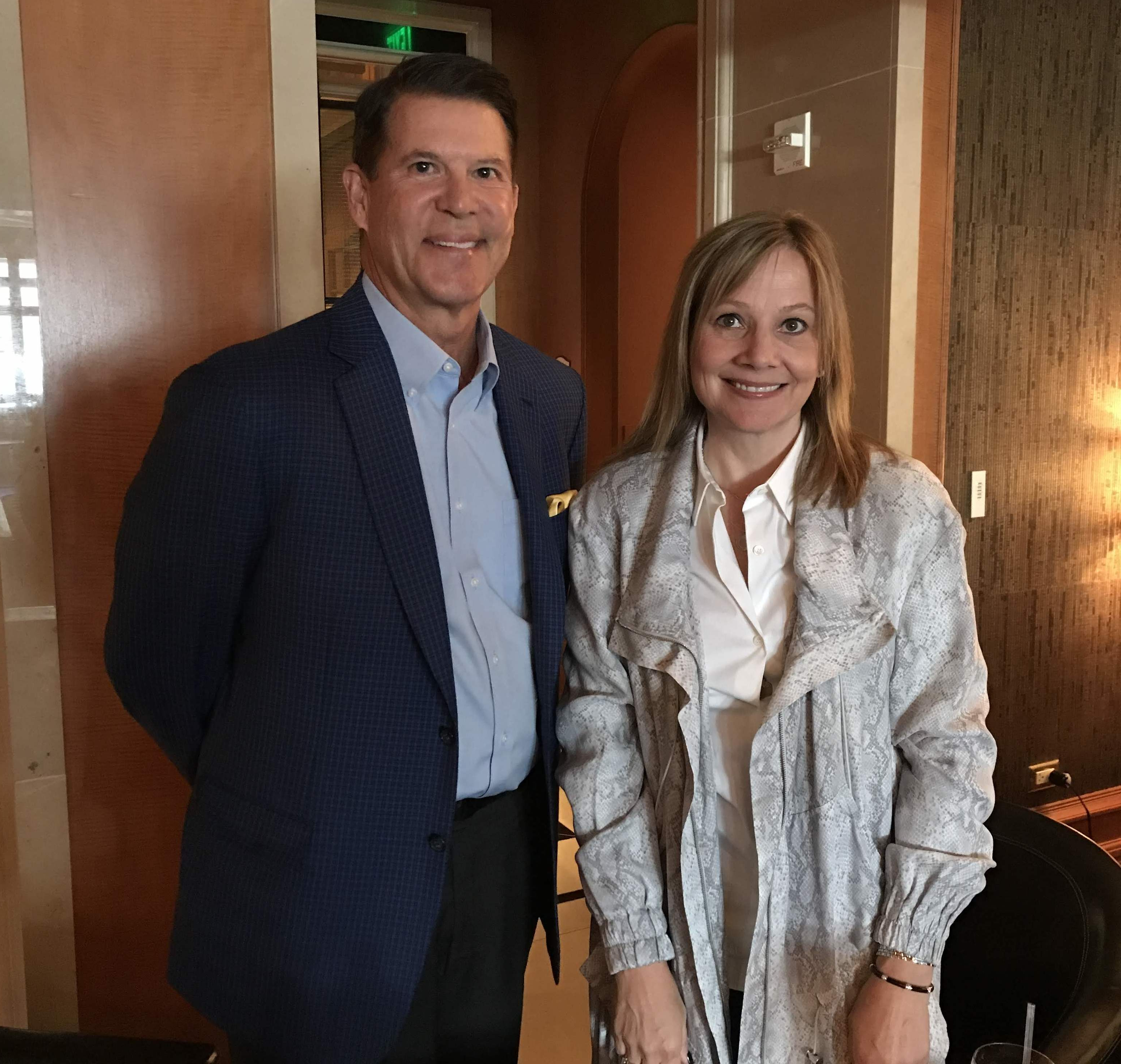
Krach with Mary Barra, CEO of General Motors

Krach began his career at General Motors where he worked at GM's Cadillac Division and Technical Center in Detroit, Michigan and GM's New York Treasurer's Office under Rick Wagoner. He was named GM's youngest-ever vice president, at 26, in 1984. He was one of the founders of GMF Robotics, a joint venture between GM and Fanuc Robotics, which became the largest provider of industrial robots in the world.

=== Silicon Valley ===
Krach left GM and took a job at startup software company Qronos. He joined Qronos as its number 2 executive in 1987 but left after nine months over what he called a conflict over values with the CEO.

In 1988, Krach became a member of the founding team of Rasna Corporation, a mechanical engineering design software company that was sold to PTC for $500 million in 1995. In 1996, Krach was the first entrepreneur in residence at Benchmark Capital, and in 2008, he became a Benchmark CEO in residence.

=== Ariba ===
From 1996 to 2003, Krach served as co-founder, chairman, and CEO of business-to-business e-commerce company Ariba, creating the world's largest business network transacting $6 trillion in commerce annually. In 1999, Krach took Ariba public via an initial public offering (IPO) on Nasdaq, with an initial valuation of $6 billion, which grew to $40 billion by 2000, making it one of the first internet software companies to go public.

In 2000, Krach led the $400 million acquisition of online business auction company Trading Dynamics Inc., and the $1.4 billion acquisition of Tradex software maker for building online communities of buyers and sellers.

=== DocuSign ===
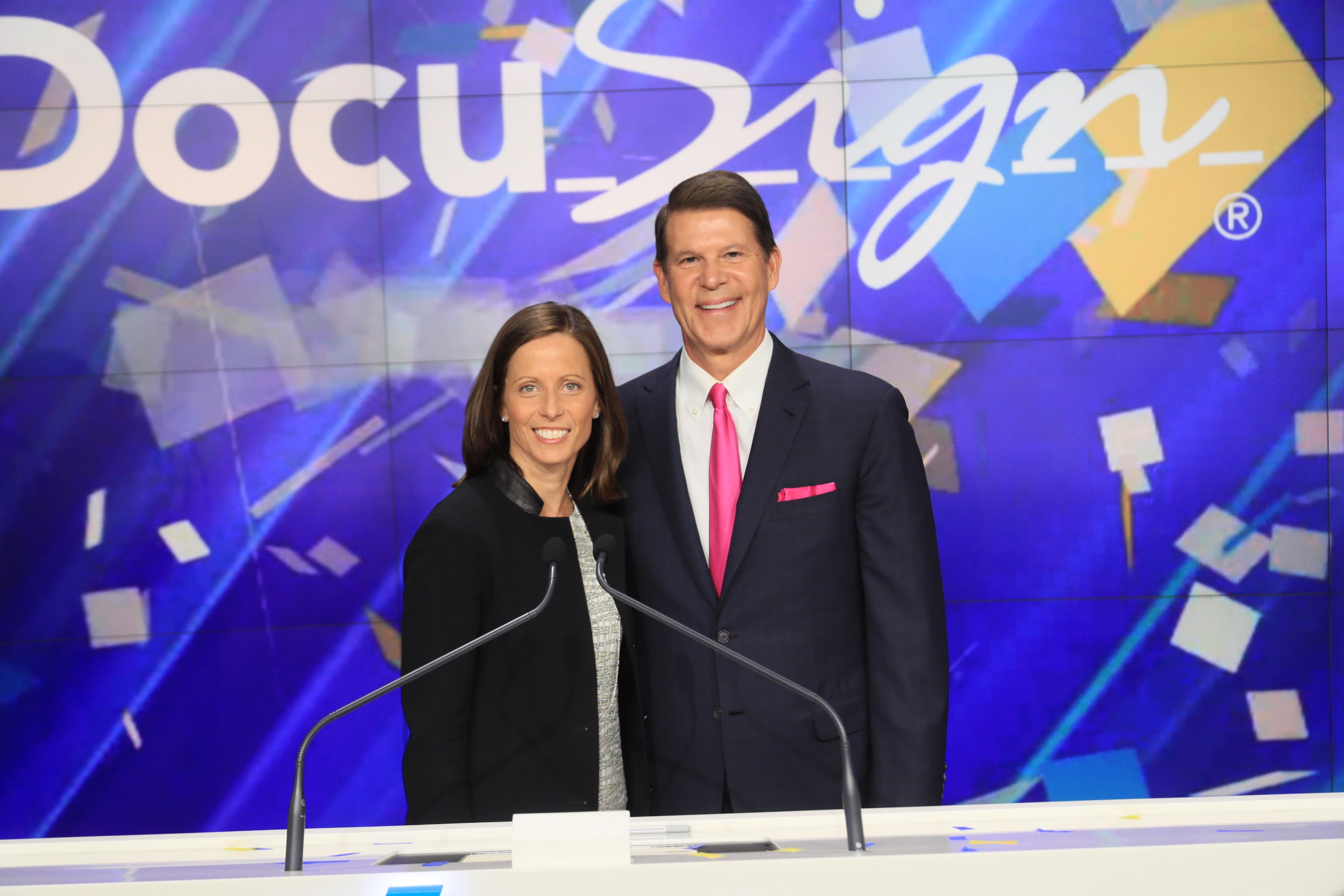
Nasdaq CEO Adena Friedman congratulates Krach on his third IPO on Nasdaq.

In 2009, Krach became the chairman and in 2011 the CEO of DocuSign, a technology company which provides electronic signature and digital transaction management services. As CEO, Krach led the creation of the digital transaction management category and the building of the DocuSign Global Trust Network which now comprises more than 1.7 million customers and more than 1 billion users in 180 countries.

In January 2017, Krach named his successor as CEO of DocuSign, with his tenure as chairman ending in January 2019. He received a 97% CEO rating on Glassdoor.

DocuSign filed for its IPO in April 2018. As of that date, Krach was the largest individual shareholder unaffiliated with a venture firm.

In an interview with Inside Philanthropy, Krach signaled his intention to focus more on philanthropy upon stepping down as DocuSign chairman.

== Board memberships and other roles ==
From 2006 to 2009, Krach served on the board of directors of XOJet, and from 2007 to 2011, on the board of Ooma.

From 2005 to 2011, Krach served as CEO of 3Points, an investment holding company based in Los Gatos, California.

Additionally, Krach served as board chairman of Angie's List from 2011 to 2014. The company went public in 2011.

In 2017, he was named to the NYCx Technology Leadership Advisory Council, a diverse group of technology and community leaders selected by New York City's Mayor, Bill de Blasio.

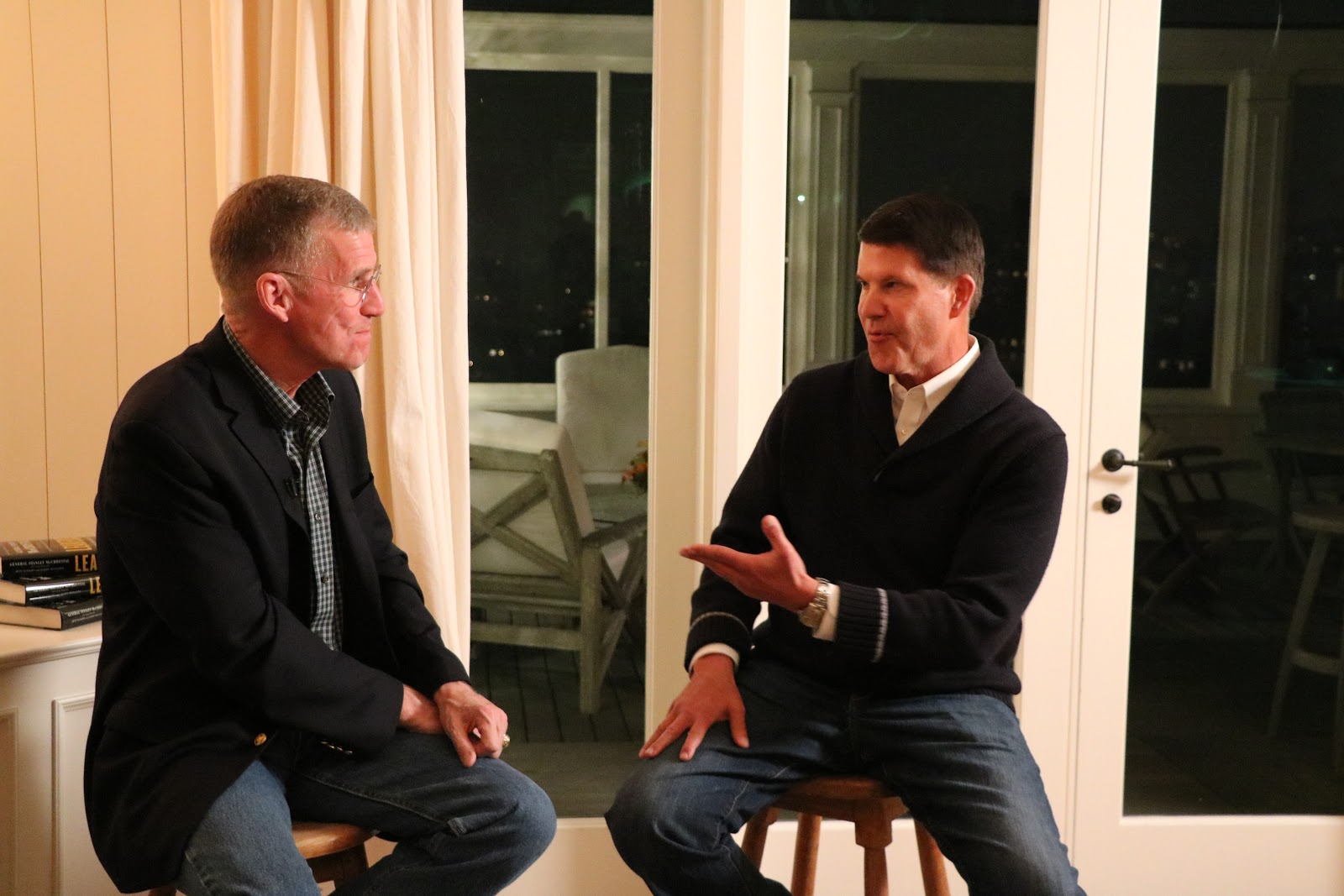
General Stanley McChrystal and Krach

Krach is the founder of the Global Mentor Network.

== Awards and recognition ==
In 1998, Krach was named a top 10 entrepreneur of the year by Red Herring Magazine. In 2000, he received the Technology Pioneer award at the World Economic Forum, in Davos, Switzerland. That same year, he was recognized as one of the top 10 tech execs by Forbes. In 2000 and again in 2015, Krach was named National Entrepreneur of the Year by Ernst & Young. Krach earned the Distinguished Engineer Alumni award from Purdue University in 2006, and in 2012 received the Alumni Achievement award from the National College Senior Honor Society. In 2014, Business Insider recognized him as one of the 50 most powerful people in enterprise tech, and the following year, the San Francisco Business Times recognized him as the most admired CEO. Krach was also awarded a Dell Founder 50 award in 2015. In 2018, Krach received the Life & News 2018 Transformational Leader of the Year award and in 2019 Harvard Business School's 2019 Business Leader of the Year award.

He also received an honorary doctorate from Ohio Northern University in 2015 in Business Administration.

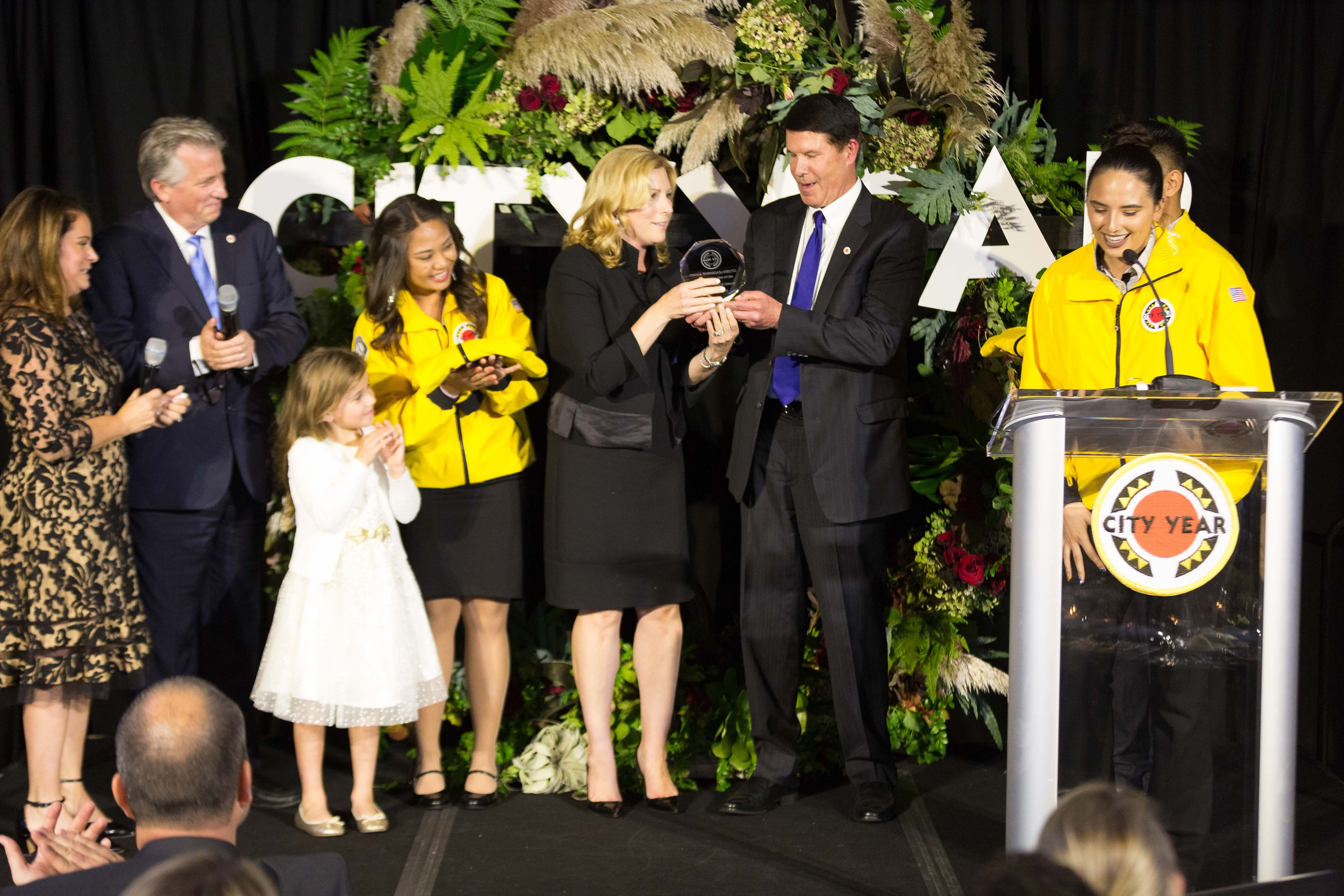
Keith and Metta Krach with Daughter Emma, receiving the City Year Citizen Leadership award

In 2019, Krach was awarded a lifetime achievement award by the Silicon Valley Leadership Group, a non-profit advocacy group that represents more than 390 Silicon Valley firms.

In 2025, Krach was named the recipient of the M. Eugene Merchant Manufacturing Medal.

Also, in September 2025, Krach was recognized by analysts at Life & News Magazine for increasing global productivity by more than $4.5 trillion throughout his career.

== Higher education ==
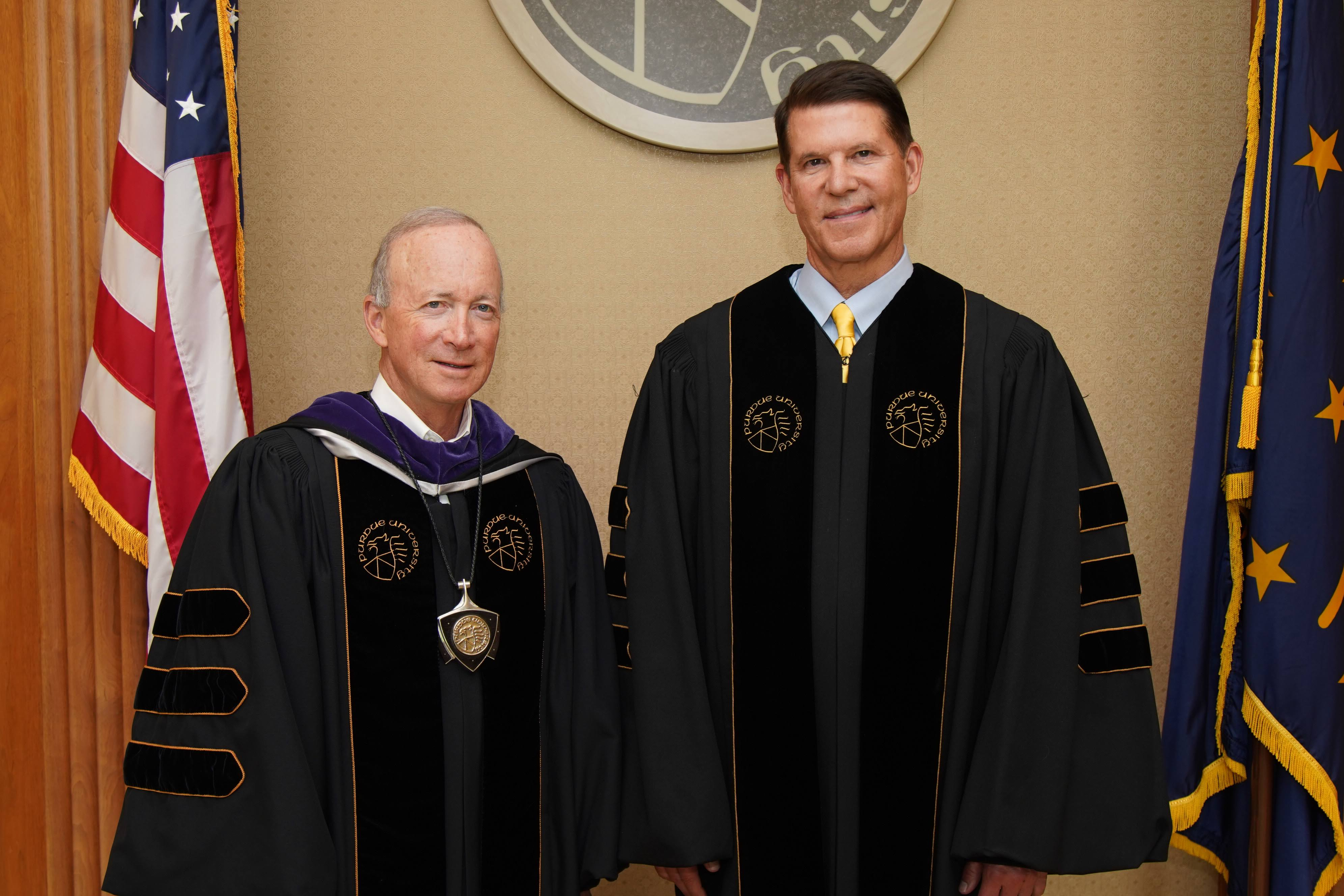
Keith Krach stands with Mitch Daniels, President of Purdue University.

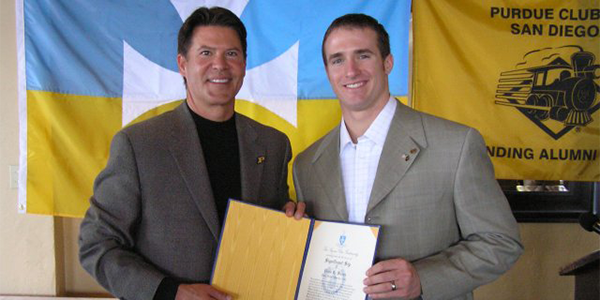
Significant Sigs Drew Brees and Keith Krach

Indiana governor Mitch Daniels appointed Krach to the Purdue board of trustees in 2007 and he served as board chairman from 2009 to 2013. In 2012, he recruited Daniels to be the 12th president of the university. Krach currently serves on the Engineering Leadership Council (ELC).

== Philanthropy ==
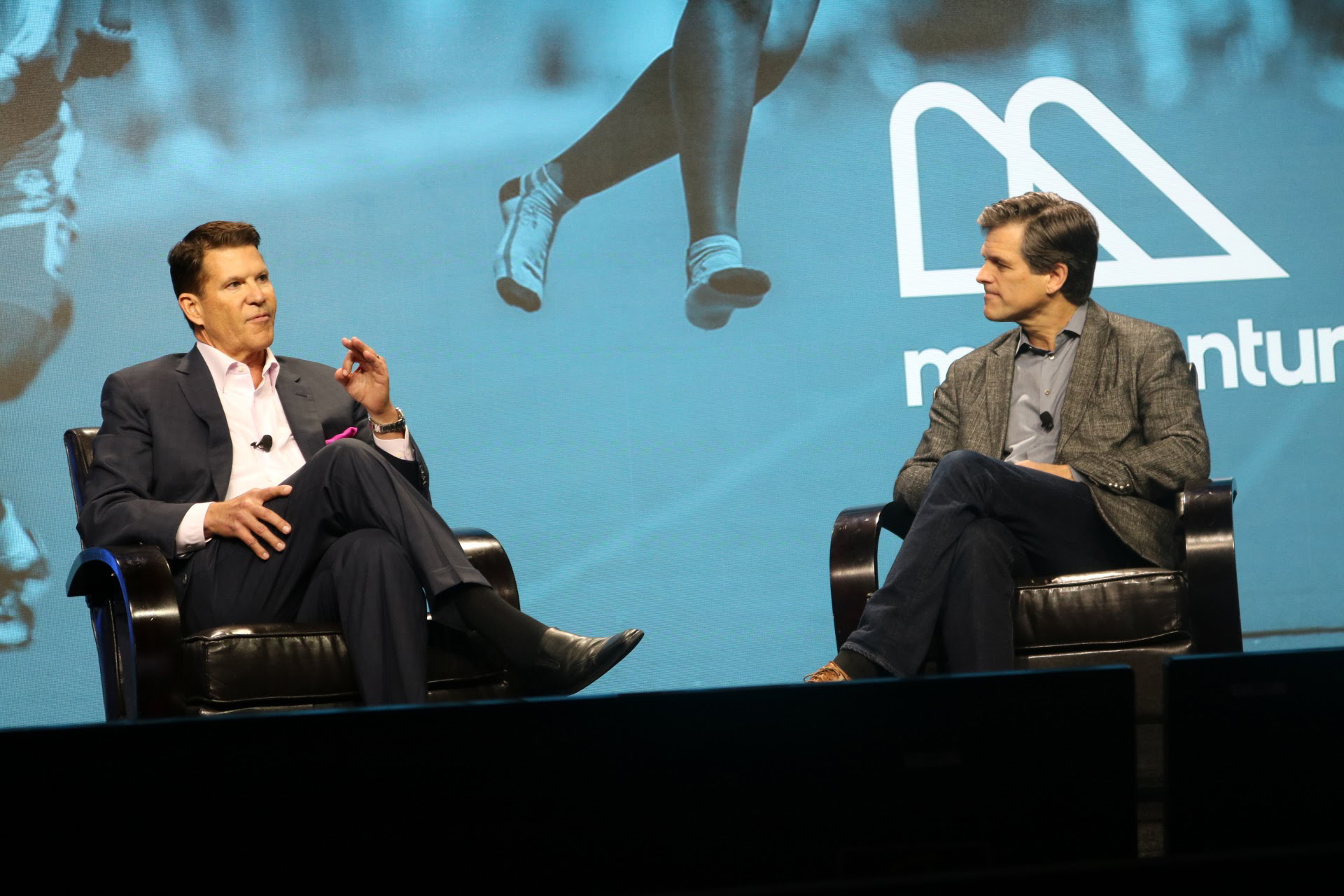
Krach with Special Olympics Chairman Tim Shriver

Krach is the chairman of the DocuSign IMPACT Foundation, DocuSign's philanthropic entity. He established the $30 Million DocuSign IMPACT Foundation with a mission to transform recipient entities by using DocuSign technology to streamline operations and make them more efficient.

Krach co-founded the Children's Autistic Network and served on the board of governors for Opportunity International.

Through the Krach Family Foundation, he funded the Keith Krach leadership scholarship at Purdue University. It has been awarded to five students each year since 2009. In 2014, Purdue dedicated the Krach Leadership Center to him.

== Author, speaker, and lecturer ==
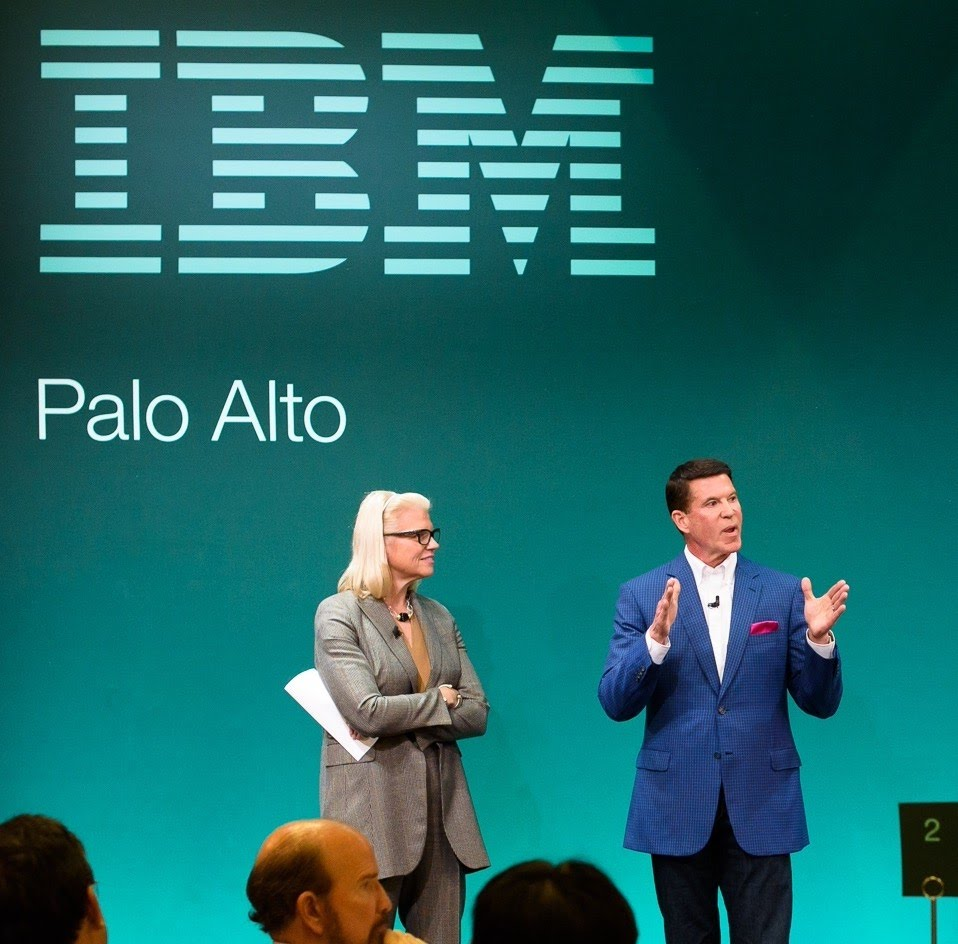
Keith Krach onstage with Ginni Rometty, CEO of IBM

Krach is a frequent contributing writer for Entrepreneur, and the World Economic Forum on various topics. He has written about global economic security issues in the Wall Street Journal, Newsweek, The Hill, Washington Examiner, Jamaica Observer, The Daily Telegraph (UK), O Globo (Brazil), and other publications. Krach has lectured on business strategy, technology and building high performance teams at Harvard, Stanford, Berkeley, and IMD business school in Switzerland.

== Government service ==
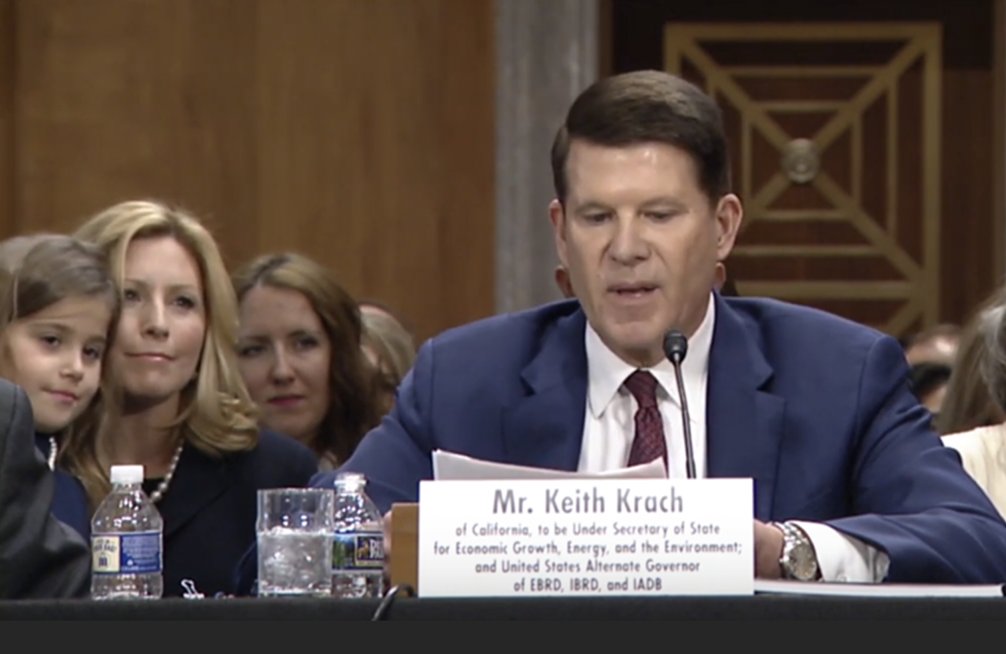
Keith Krach testifies at his Senate committee hearing.

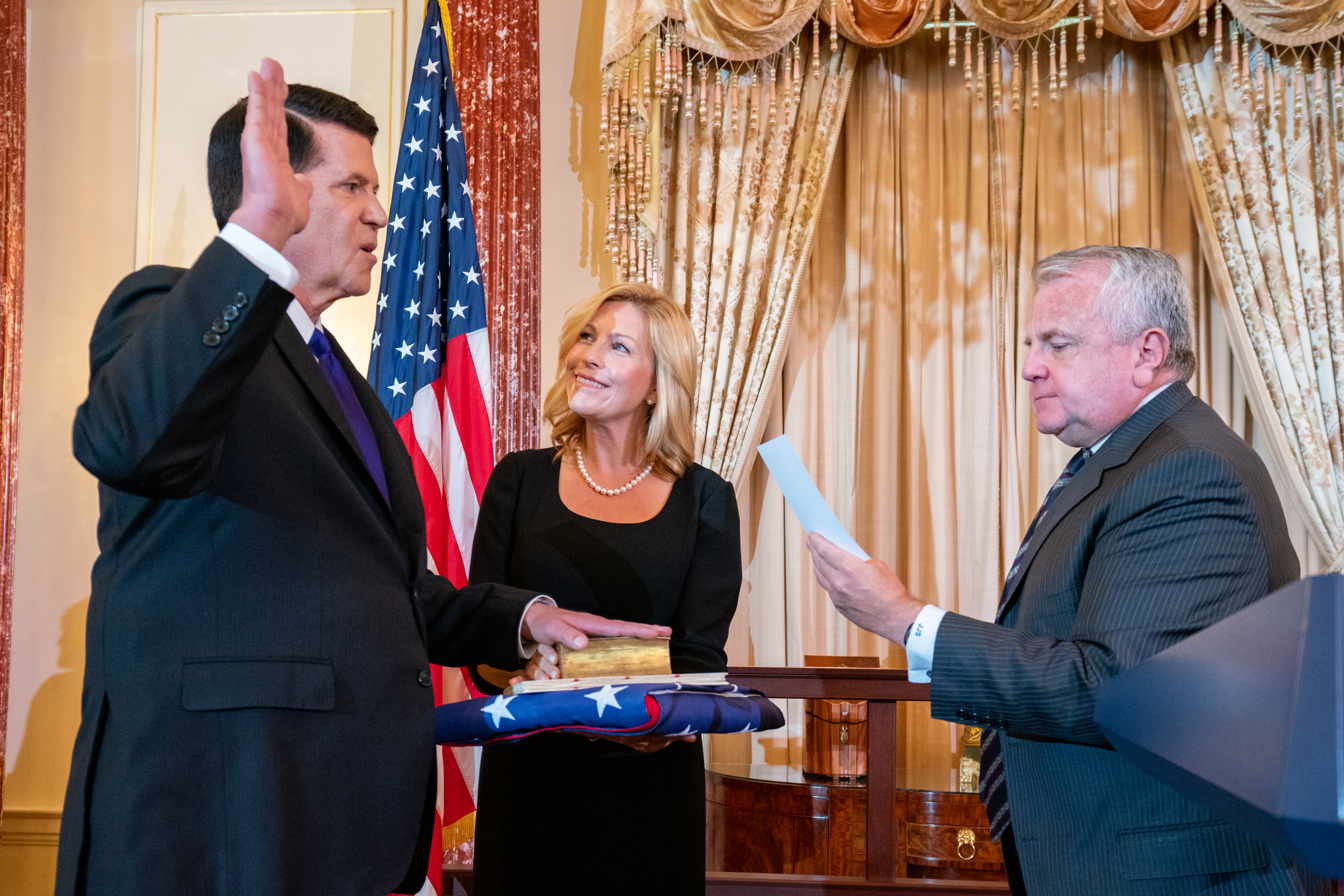
Krach sworn in as Under Secretary of State for Economic Growth, Energy, and the Environment by John J. Sullivan in 2019

On June 20, 2019, Krach was confirmed by the Senate as under secretary of state for economic growth, energy, and the environment, United States alternate governor of the European Bank for Reconstruction and Development, and United States alternate governor of the International Bank for Reconstruction and Development. He served as the country's top economic diplomat for the State Department.

=== Nomination and confirmation ===
Krach was confirmed by unanimous voice vote in the Senate.

=== Pandemic response ===
In the spring and summer of 2020, Krach and his State Department team supported efforts to repatriate more than 60,000 Americans who were stranded overseas by the coronavirus pandemic, and also worked to accelerate supply chains for PPE and other vital supplies to safeguard the lives of healthcare workers, patients, and American families.

In March 2020, an article was published by Bloomberg, stating that Krach had made a billion dollars as a result of a runup in DocuSign's stock price, stating that Krach "benefited from a pandemic that's left millions of Americans unemployed." Bloomberg retracted the article and published a letter to the editor from Krach titled "Public Service Is Worth More Than a Billion." In his letter, Krach pointed out that "I divested my entire stake in DocuSign and my other holdings as a condition of joining the federal government, meaning I profited in no way."

=== Congress ===
During the pandemic, Krach led State Department's efforts to accelerate efforts to reduce supply chain dependency away from China and move production onshore for critical technologies. On May 14, 2020, TSMC announced a plan to build a $12 billion 5 nanometer semiconductor fab in the United States. TSMC represented the largest onshoring in US history.

==== Taiwan relationship ====
On September 17, 2020, Krach was the first under secretary to visit Taiwan since the United States stopped recognizing the government in Taipei (replacing it instead in favor of the government in Beijing). Krach led the development of an economic collaboration agreement which he named the Lee Economic Prosperity Partnership ("EPP") after Taiwan's "Father of Democracy," former President Lee Teng-hui. A five-year agreement was signed on November 20, 2020. Krach also initiated and presided over a U.S.-Taiwan Science and Technology Cooperation Agreement, signed on December 15, 2020. Krach's team and the State Department also established the first step of the TIFA trade agreement in January 2021.

On January 20, 2021, China imposed sanctions against Krach, outgoing US Secretary of State Mike Pompeo, former secretary of health and human services Alex Azar, outgoing US ambassador to the United Nations Kelly Craft, and 24 other former Trump officials.

==== The Clean Network ====
Undersecretary of State Krach was responsible for the development and implementation of the Clean Network Alliance of Democracies which is designed to be a US government-led global effort to address what the State Department describes as "the long-term threat to data privacy, security, human rights and principled collaboration posed to the free world from authoritarian malign actors." Krach coined the term "The Clean Network" to describe what he described in his Senate confirmation hearing as an alliance of democracies and companies that operate by a set of trust principles.

On May 15, 2020, The Clean Network commenced with three simultaneous announcements of three related initiatives to put Huawei on the defensive and dubbed the 5G Trifecta; the onshoring of TSMC's semiconductors, the tightening of export controls on Huawei; and the global roll out of the 5G Clean Path.

Krach secured commitments to the Clean Network from other EU countries, such as Estonia, Albania, Austria, Germany, Luxembourg, Belgium, Spain, Portugal, Bulgaria, Kosovo, North Macedonia, and Cyprus. In December 2020 and January 2021 Krach onboarded countries including Palau, Ukraine and Georgia.

===== Capital markets =====
Krach led the State Department's efforts to protect American investors from unknowingly financing what he described as the People's Republic of China's military, security, intelligence apparatus and, human rights abuses.

== Post-government activities ==
=== Chairman of the US-Taiwan Business Council ===
In July 2024, Krach accepted the position of chairman of the board of directors for the US-Taiwan Business Council (USTBC), succeeding Michael R. Splinter. In this role, he leads efforts to strengthen economic and business relations between the United States and Taiwan. In January 2024, Krach led the annual Chairman's delegation of the USTBC to Taiwan, arriving shortly after Taiwan's elections. The delegation, comprising senior executives from prominent American and Taiwanese companies, expressed support for Taiwan's vibrant democracy and explored opportunities for collaboration in key industries.

=== CEO Freedom 250 ===
In 2025, Krach became CEO of Freedom 250, a nonprofit organization involved in organizing and promoting events connected to the United States Semiquincentennial celebrations in 2026.

== Personal life ==
Krach lives in Washington D.C. He has five children.
