= Kent Parker =

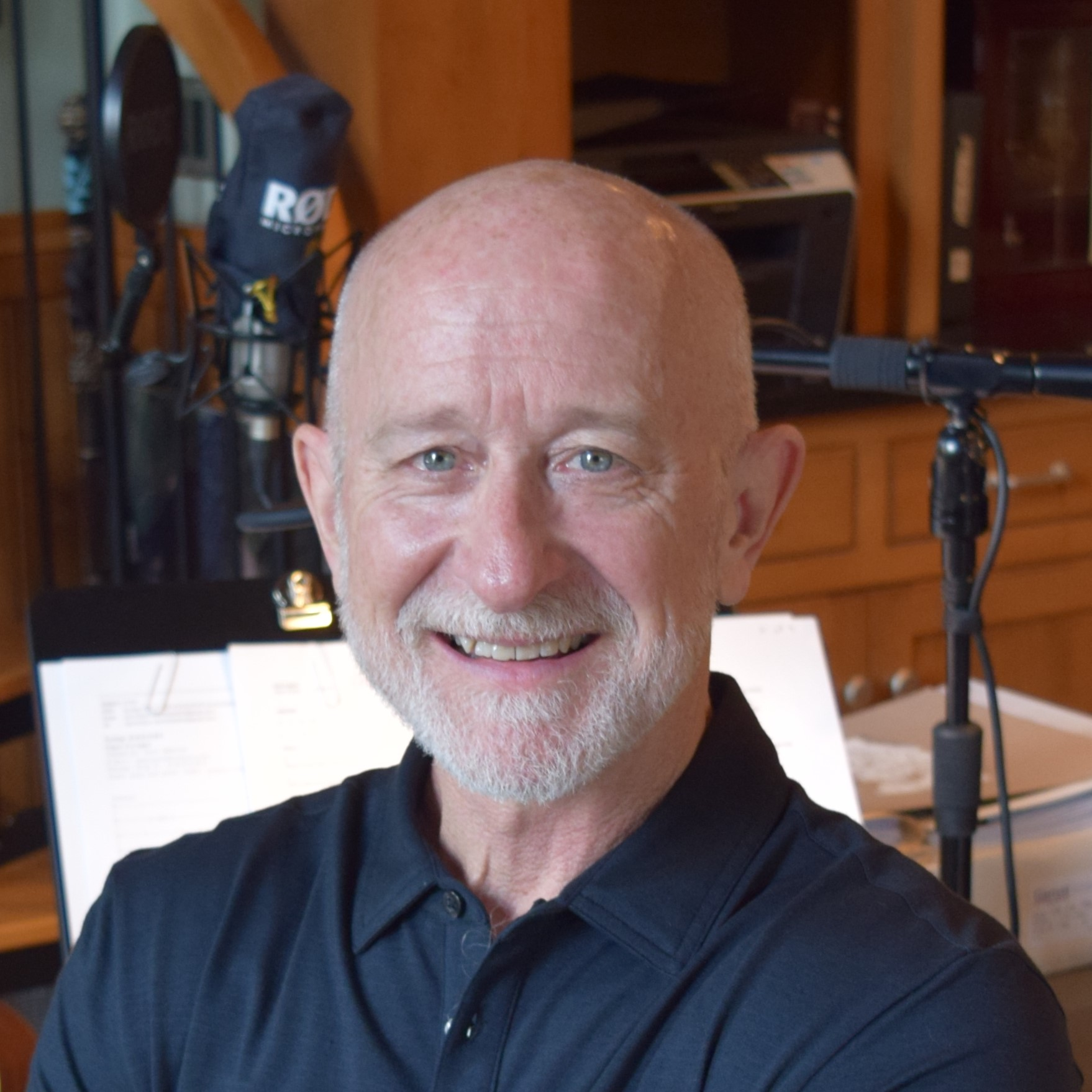
- Born: Kent Parker; Fort Branch, Indiana
- Education: BSME, University of Evansville; MBA, Dartmouth College
- Occupations: Inventor, business executive, philanthropist
- Known for: Caribou Coffee; Ariba
- Spouse: Laurie Parker
- Website: www.kentparkermusic.com

Kent L. Parker is an American businessman, entrepreneur, inventor, real estate developer, and philanthropist. He is most notable for his work with early-stage software companies.

== Early life and education ==
Parker was born and raised on a farm in rural Fort Branch, Indiana. The 68-acre property had been in Parker's family since 1934.

His mother, Phyllis, was a records input secretary at the Evansville Indiana State Police. His father, Glenn Parker, was employed at the Ball Corporation in Muncie and holds a patent for a multi-unit package of metal containers used in the food and beverage industry.

Kent Parker attended Wood Memorial High School where he was active in wrestling, cross-country running and track. Parker won awards for biology and was a strong student. In 1978, he was selected by the local American Legion to represent his school at Hoosier Boys State at Indiana State University Terre Haute. He was one of four speakers at his graduation ceremony.

Parker attended the University of Evansville where he graduated magna cum laude in 1983 with a B.S. in mechanical engineering. He went on to earn an MBA with distinction from Tuck School of Business at Dartmouth College in 1990. At Dartmouth, Parker was named one of 26 Edward Tuck Scholars. Between his first and second year of business school, Parker worked in Japan for the Nissan Motor Company.

== Professional career ==
=== Carrier Corporation ===
Parker began his career with the Bryant Day and Night Payne Corporation, a unit of Carrier Corporation in Indianapolis, IN. As a development engineer at Carrier, Parker earned a patent for a furnace inducer outlet box assembly.

=== Davidson Textron ===
Following business school, Parker moved to Davidson Textron where he focused on strategic sourcing, manufacturing, and program management. At Textron, Parker secured five individual patents covering a method of molding automotive interiors, an air-bag restraint system, an automobile door assembly, a method for molding a pre-assembled door within an instrument panel, and a method for forming a recyclable pour tool.

=== Caribou Coffee ===
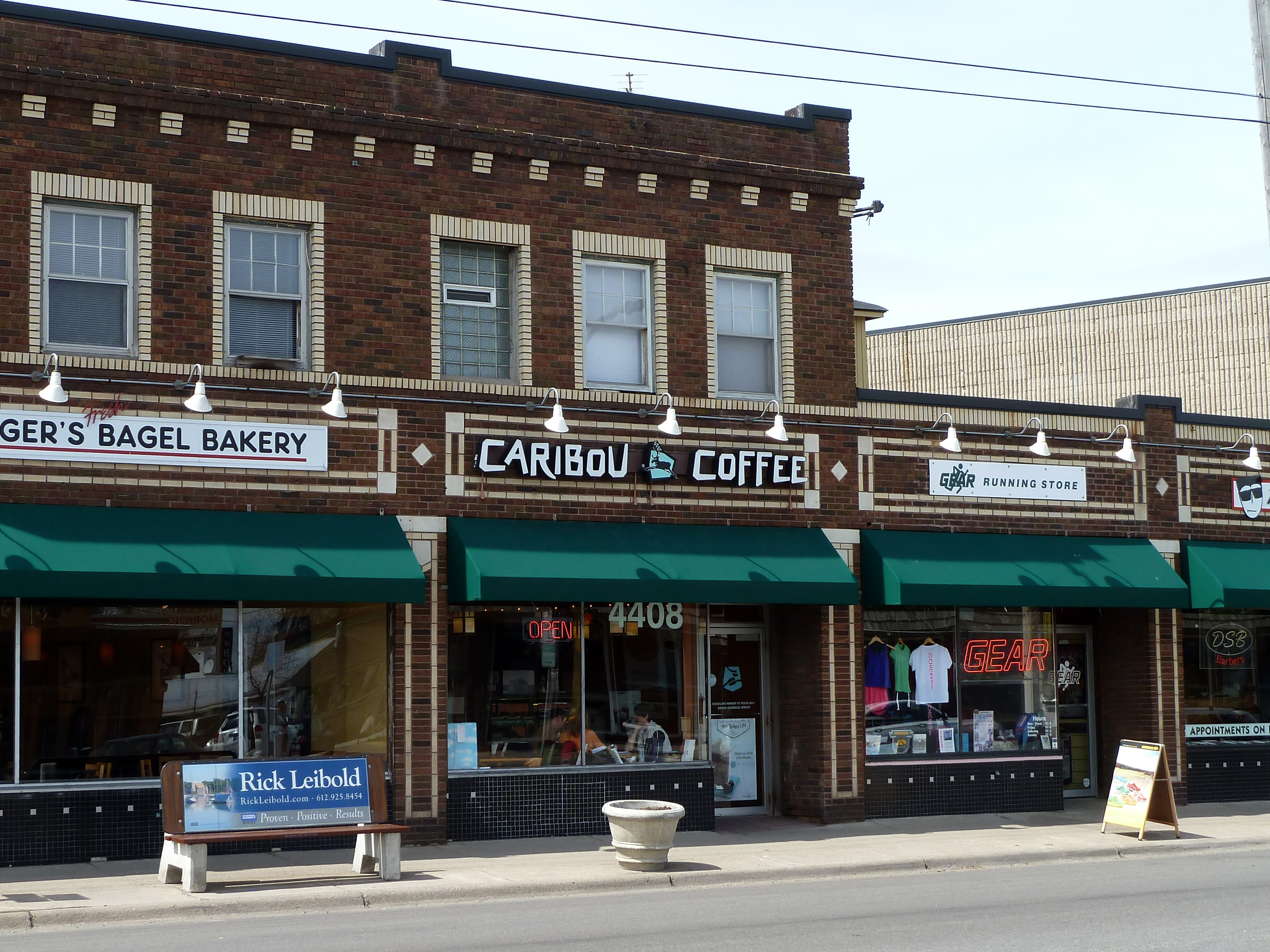
Caribou Coffee's first location

In 1994 Parker joined John Puckett as part of the senior leadership team at Caribou Coffee. The two had been roommates at Dartmouth. The company sought to build a "National Park Lodge Theme" and sold its products at retail locations, grocery stories and through a mail-order operation. Over the course of two years from 1997 to 1999 Parker helped grow the company's wholesale division from $200,000 to almost $10 million through partnerships with Delta Air Lines, Target and Aramark. Caribou Coffee expanded to 100 stores and 2,000 employees before being sold in 2001 to Arcapita for approximately $80 million.

=== FreeMarkets, Inc. ===
Parker held multiple positions at FreeMarkets between April 2000 and July 2024 including senior vice president of global sourcing services and vice president and general manager of automotive business. Parker launched FreeMarkets' Automotive World Headquarters in 2000 and grew it to $40 million within a year. He oversaw a staff of 500 across the United States and Europe. In January 2004, Freemarkets was acquired by Ariba for $493 million.

=== Ariba ===
Following the sale of FreeMarkets to Ariba, Parker stayed on initially serving as Executive Vice President, Ariba Global Services Organization before being elevated to COO in 2007. While at Ariba, Parker oversaw more than 1,000 people across 36 different countries. He retired from Ariba following the company's sale to SAP AG in 2012.

== Awards and recognition ==
In 2013, Parker was named Executive-in-Residence at the University of Southern Indiana's Romain College of Business.

Parker was guest speaker at the Indiana Vision 2025 forum, held in Indianapolis in December 2013.

== Philanthropy ==
Parker is actively involved in the cultural life of New Harmony, Indiana.

Parker and his wife Laurie established the Kent and Laurie Parker Family Foundation in 2013. Based in New Harmony, the non-profit organization makes regional and national grants.

In 2018, the foundation pledged $50,000 towards the repair and restoration of the Harmony Way Bridge in southern Indiana.

Parker has served on the boards of the Hosier Art Salon, Harmonie Associates, Historic New Harmony, Rapp Granary Owen Foundation, Inc. and the Robert Lee Blaffer Foundation.

Parker and his wife provided funding for The Bicentennial House, a cultural facility in New Harmony. Completed in 2014, the project was inspired by the original single-family homes built by the Harmonie Society.

== Personal life ==
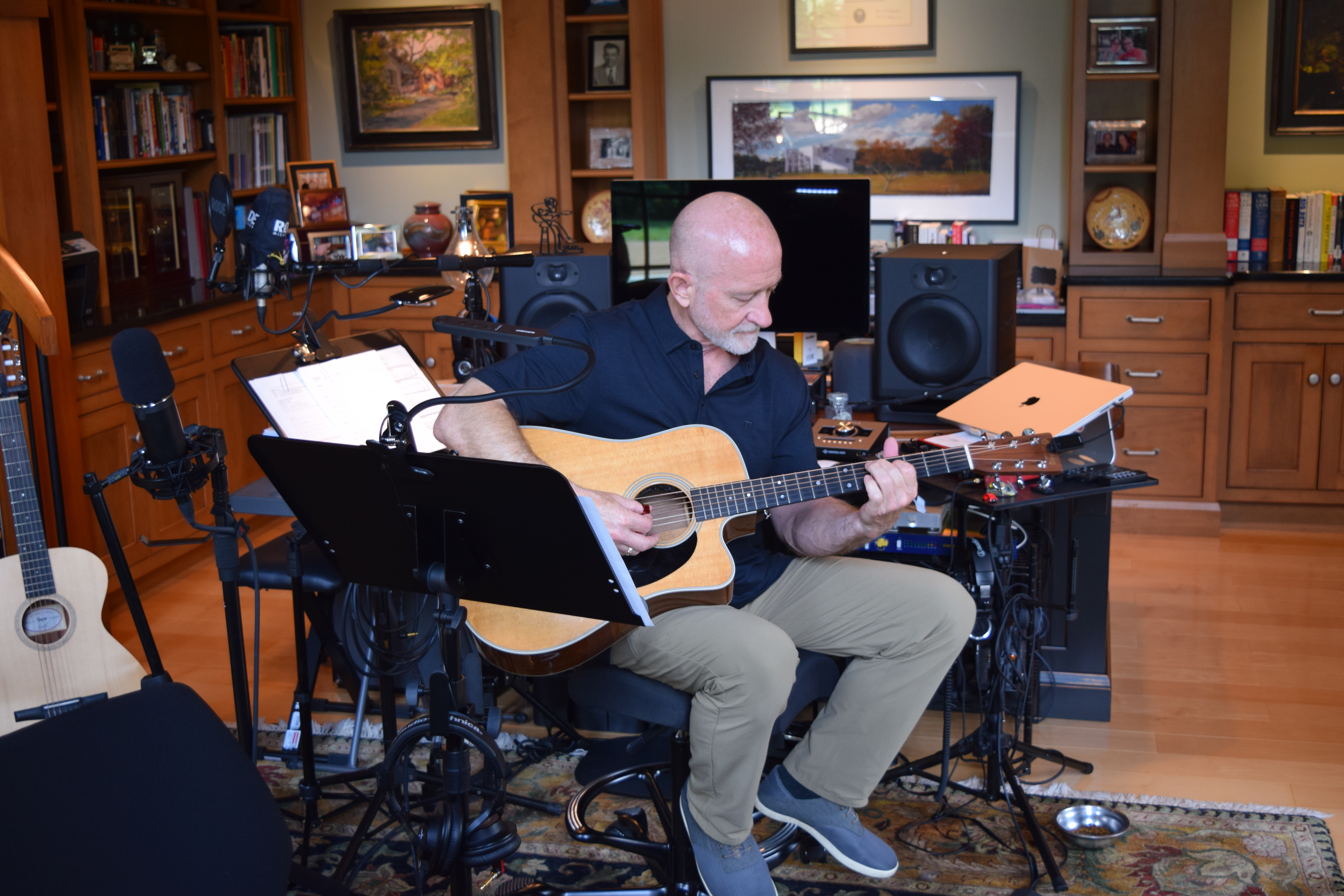
Kent Parker with his guitar.

Parker produced and released an album of original music in 2025 titled The Way. The album reflects his life experiences and creative journey. Parker's musical writing style blends progressive Americana with classic country. The album features musicians including Charlie McCoy, Brent Mason, Aaron Sterling, Sean Hurley, Jason Webb, Gideon Klein, Daniel Fraire, Fats Kaplin, Rafael Pirela, Nashville Recording Orchestra and Venezuela Strings Recording Ensemble. The album was recognized for its authenticity and emotional depth.
