= US–Taiwan Business Council =

U.S.-based trade promotion group

US-Taiwan Business Council 美台商業協會
- Formation: 1976
- Founded at: Chicago, Illinois
- Type: Non-profit
- Tax ID no.: 52-2005958
- Purpose: Trade Promotion
- Headquarters: Arlington, Virginia, United States
- Services: Information Products; Relationship Management; Client Representation; Consulting
- Chairman: Keith J. Krach
- Key people: Honorary Co-Chair: Senator Lisa Murkowski Senator Mark Kelly; President: Rupert J. Hammond-Chambers
- Website: www.us-taiwan.org

The US–Taiwan Business Council (USTBC; Chinese: 美台商業協會; pinyin: Měi Tái Shāngyè Xíehùi) is a membership-based, non-profit organization founded in 1976 to foster trade and business relations between the United States and Taiwan. Council members consist of private companies with business interests in Taiwan, and range in size from one-person consulting firms to large multinational corporations. Because the organization reflects the views and concerns of an extensive group of U.S. businesses, the council is generally considered to be one of the most influential private organizations playing a part in the relationship between the United States and Taiwan. The organization is particularly well known in the Defense & Security community, as it is the host of an annual US-Taiwan Defense Industry Conference. The inaugural conference in St. Petersburg, Florida in 2002 brought Taiwan's Minister of National Defense to the U.S. for the first time since 1979.

== Mandate ==
The mission of the US–Taiwan Business Council – as defined in its bylaws – is to develop private economic, commercial and financial relationships, to foster investment, trade, and commerce between the United States and Taiwan.

== Services ==
The organization provides a variety of services to its members, including:

=== Consulting ===
Tactical and strategic business advice to companies looking to get established, or to expand, in the Taiwan market. Advocacy work – on behalf of individual companies or on behalf of groups of members – can range from dealing with market access issues and equipment sales, to resolving contractual difficulties or attempting to change Taiwan government policies.

=== eBulletins ===
Weekly email bulletins examine recent US-Taiwan-China business, economic, and political developments. Issues covered include General Business, Finance & Banking, Defense & Security, Semiconductors, PCs, Intellectual property, and Biotechnology, among others.

=== Analysis reports ===
The council occasionally publishes reports providing up-to-date analysis on events and developments that affect businesses operating within the triangular U.S.-Taiwan-China relationship. These papers and statements, which include editorials and research reports, are distributed to members when situations warrant.

=== Events ===
The Council holds conferences, seminars, receptions, and other events throughout the U.S. and Taiwan each year. The two largest events are the annual the U.S.-Taiwan Defense Industry Conference and the Taiwan + China Semiconductor Industry Conference. Tang Yao-ming, Taiwan's Minister of National Defense, U.S. Deputy Secretary of Defense Paul Wolfowitz and U.S. Assistant Secretary of State James Kelly attended the 2002 Defense Industry Conference in St. Petersburg, Florida. Taiwan Minister of National Defense Chen Chao-min attended the 2008 Defense Industry Conference on Amelia Island, Florida.

=== Relationship building ===
The organization cultivates an extensive network of contacts and relationships within the U.S. and Taiwan governments, as well as within the private sector and among non-government organizations with an interest in Taiwan. Both the United States Congress and the Executive Branch frequently call upon the organization to express its views on the US-Taiwan business relationship.

== Organizational structure ==
Chairman
Executive Committee
Board of Directors
President
Vice President
Staff in functional departments

=== Current staff ===
Chairman: Keith J. Krach
President: Rupert Hammond-Chambers
Vice President: Lotta Danielsson

== History ==
=== 1970s ===
In 1976, David M. Kennedy formed the organization in Chicago, Illinois as the "USA-ROC Economic Council". For the next 14 years he served as chairman of the organization and helped guide its development. William Morell was elected president the same year.

The organization quickly got involved with the commercial and political spheres in both the United States and Taiwan, and it played an important role in the drafting and passing of the Taiwan Relations Act in 1979, the legislation that guides US-Taiwan relations in lieu of official diplomatic recognition.

=== 1980s ===
The 1980s brought the council an expanded membership base and deeper ties with business and political leaders in Taiwan. Since U.S. diplomatic recognition had been transferred from Taipei to Beijing, the council took on greater importance as it continued to work towards strengthening trade and communications with Taiwan on behalf of American companies.

=== 1990s ===
In 1990, Caspar Weinberger succeeded David Kennedy as chairman of the organization and David Laux was elected to take the place of outgoing president William Morell. The change in leadership also brought with it a change in venue, as the council relocated its office from Chicago to Washington, D.C.

In 1991, the council formed its "Chairman's Circle", a group of member companies with heavily vested business interests in Taiwan. In 1995, Dan Tellep was elected chairman as Caspar Weinberger rotated out of the post. Soon afterwards the "USA-ROC Economic Council" changed its name to the "US-ROC (Taiwan) Business Council".

William P. Clark was elected chairman in January 1997. Later that year, Senators Frank H. Murkowski of Alaska and John D. Rockefeller, IV of West Virginia became honorary co-chairmen. The council also moved once more to Arlington, Virginia, to share a floor with the Washington Headquarters of the American Institute in Taiwan, the entity that – under contract to the U.S. State Department – manages America's unofficial relationship with the island. Frank C. Carlucci replaced William Clark as chairman of the organization in 1999.

=== 2000s ===
In 2000, David Laux stepped down and Rupert Hammond-Chambers was elected as the youngest-ever president. In 2001, the name of the organization was again changed to "US-Taiwan Business Council". In 2003, William Cohen was elected as chairman, and Senator Conrad Burns of Montana took the place of Frank Murkowski as honorary co-chairman.

In 2005, the council gained new leadership with the election of Senator William Brock to the chairmanship and Vance D. Coffman to the position of vice chairman. In 2007, Senator Lisa Murkowski of Alaska took over the honorary co-chairman seat vacated by Conrad Burns. In 2008, Paul D. Wolfowitz joined the council as its chairman, succeeding Bill Brock.

=== 2010s ===
In 2016, Senator Bob Menendez of New Jersey took over the honorary co-chairman seat vacated by Jay Rockefeller, who had held the post since 1997. In 2018, Michael R. Splinter joined the council as its chairman, succeeding Paul D. Wolfowitz.

=== 2020s ===
On July 1, 2024, the council announced that Keith J. Krach had accepted the position as Chairman of its Board of Directors. Mr. Krach replaced Michael R. Splinter in the post.

== Miscellaneous ==
The council is incorporated in the District of Columbia and is designated by the Internal Revenue Service as a tax-exempt organization under section 501(c)(6) of the Internal Revenue Code.

The council's "sister organization" in Taiwan is the ROC-USA Business Council. During the 1980s and 1990s, the two organizations co-hosted conferences – called "Annual Joint Business Conferences" – which were held on alternate years in either Taiwan or the US. The conferences served as opportunities for high-level bilateral dialogue, and often brought United States Cabinet officers to Taiwan. This tradition ended in 2004.
