= Einstein Bros. Bagels =

American bagel and coffee chain

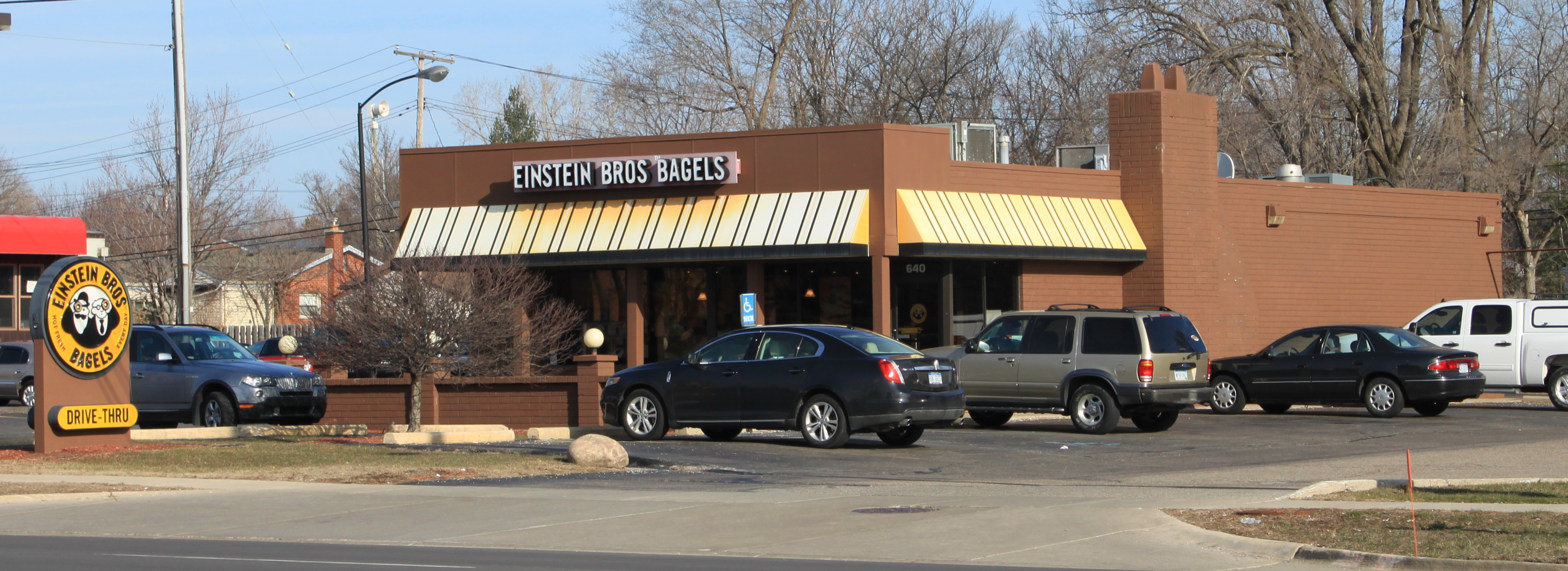
- Einstein Bros. Bagels in Plymouth, Michigan
- Type: Subsidiary
- Industry: Quick-casual restaurant Franchising
- Founded: December 1995; 30 years ago Golden, Colorado, U.S.
- Headquarters: Lakewood, Colorado, U.S.
- Products: Bagels, pastries, coffee
- Parent: Einstein Noah Restaurant Group, Inc.
- Website: EinsteinBros.com

Einstein Bros. Bagels is an American chain of bagel cafes. In the 1990s, the company bought out several retail bagel chains from regions around the US which lacked bagel traditions. After filing for bankruptcy in 2000, the company was bought out by New World Coffee. It became part of Panera Brands in August 2021.

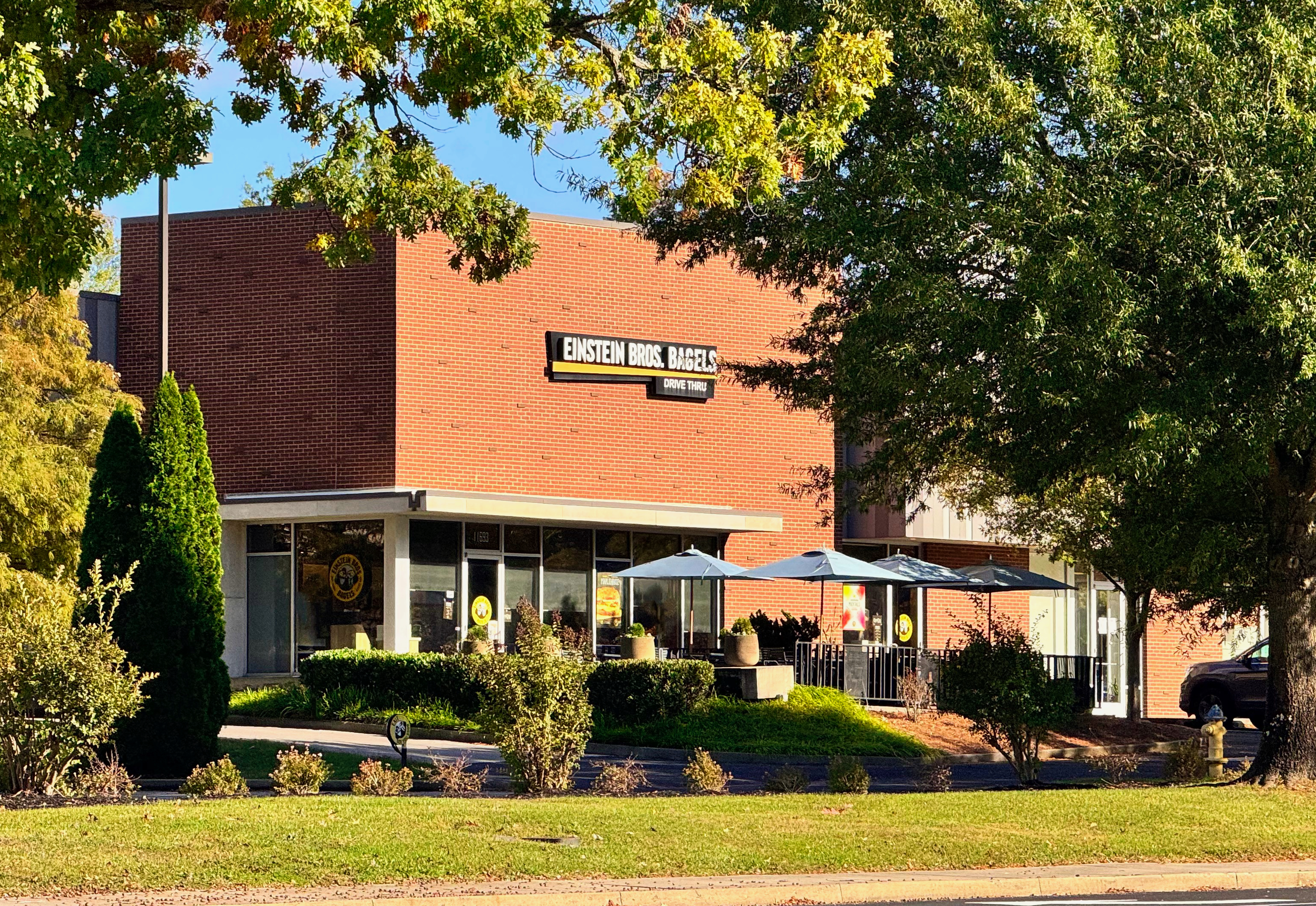
Einstein Bros. Bagels' modern cafe design in Farragut, Tennessee

== History ==
Einstein Bros. was created by the chain restaurant corporation Boston Chicken (now Boston Market) in 1995, as a way to market breakfast foods. The chain is now owned by Panera Brands.

Boston Chicken, Inc. originally formed the Einstein and Noah Bagel Corporation as Progressive Bagel Concepts, Incorporated (PBCI) in March 1995, when it purchased four retail bagel chains, all located in regions of the United States that did not have longstanding bagel traditions. These companies included Offerdahl's Bagel Gourmet (Fort Lauderdale), Bagel & Bagel (Kansas City), Baltimore Bagel (San Diego), and Brackman Brothers, Incorporated (Salt Lake City). Each found that their stores were similar in that they offered both original and new bagel flavors in wealthy neighborhoods where the customers had relatively little previous exposure to bagels.

Noah's Bagels was founded in 1989 by Noah Alper on College Avenue in Berkeley, California. In 1996, the chain of 38 stores was sold to Einstein Bros. for $100 million.

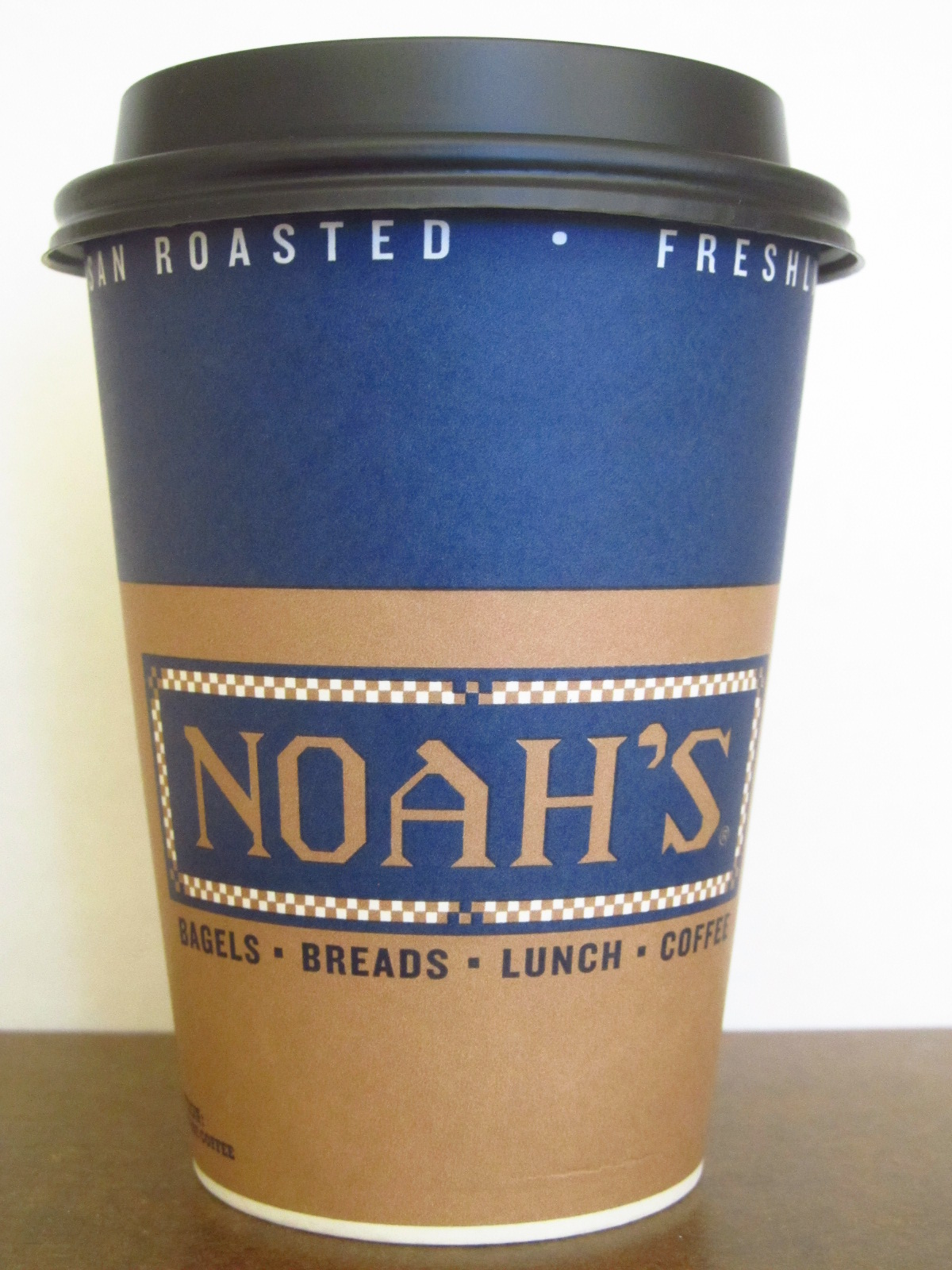
Noah's Bagels was bought out by Einstein.

=== Acquisition by New World Coffee ===
New World Coffee was founded in the early 1990s by Ramin Kamfar, an investment banker who left his finance career to open a coffee shop. It bought Manhattan Bagel out of bankruptcy in 1998. The combined company purchased Chesapeake Bagel Bakery in 1999 when that chain had 89 stores, giving Manhattan approximately 350 locations.

In 2000, Einstein Bros. filed for bankruptcy, having loaned too much money to franchisees. After it declared bankruptcy, New World Coffee, which had earlier attempted an unsuccessful hostile takeover, bought the company out of bankruptcy for $190 million.

=== Other acquisitions and mergers ===
In 2014, Einstein Noah Restaurant Group was acquired by JAB Holding Company and BDT Capital Partners.

On August 5, 2021, Einstein Bros. announced that it had merged with Panera Bread and Caribou Coffee to form Panera Brands.

== See also ==
- List of bakery cafés
