= SAP Ariba =

American software and information technology services company

- Type: Subsidiary
- Traded as: Formerly Nasdaq: ARBA
- Industry: Internet software and services
- Founded: 1996; 30 years ago
- Headquarters: Palo Alto, California, U.S.
- Area served: Worldwide
- Key people: Robert M. Calderoni, Keith Krach
- Products: SAP Ariba Network, Source-to-Pay, Contract Management Software
- Revenue: ▲$ 335.1 million (FY 2011)
- Operating income: ▼$ -2.9 million (FY 2011)
- Net income: ▲$ 33.2 million (FY 2011)
- Total assets: ▲$ 913.1 million (FY 2011)
- Total equity: ▲$ 647.9 million (FY 2011)
- Number of employees: 3,636 (December 2015)
- Parent: SAP SE
- Website: www.sap.com/products/spend-management.html

SAP Ariba is an American software and information technology services company located in Palo Alto, California. The former Ariba business was acquired by German software maker SAP SE for $4.3 billion in 2012.

== History ==
=== Company beginnings ===
Ariba (now SAP Ariba) was founded in 1996 by Bobby Lent, Boris Putanec, Paul Touw, Rob Desantis, Ed Kinsey, Paul Hegarty, and Keith Krach on the idea of using the Internet to enable companies to facilitate and improve the procurement process, which was paper-based, labor-intensive, and inefficient for large corporations. The name Ariba is a neologism, chosen by a branding company since it was easy to pronounce and spell. The pre-launch name was Procuresoft.

Ariba went public in 1999 under Krach's leadership as CEO, and was one of the first business-to-business Internet companies to do an IPO. The company's stock more than tripled from the offering price on opening day, making the three-year-old company worth $4 billion. In 2000, the stock value continued to climb, and Ariba's market capitalization was as high as $40 billion. With the bursting of the dot-com bubble, Ariba's stock price fell dramatically in July 2001 to its IPO level, where it remained for the rest of its life as an independent company.

=== Past acquisitions ===
On December 17, 1999, Ariba announced it would acquire Atlanta-based Tradex Technologies in a stock swap valued then at $1.86 billion. Tradex was the leader in the nascent Digital Marketplace Software field. The stock market liked the acquisition and the price of Ariba's shares rose from $57 at the time of the announcement to $173 at closing on March 9, 2000, which also marked the peak of the Internet Bubble. The 33.2 million shares that Ariba issued to buy Tradex were then worth $5.6 billion to Tradex shareholders.

In January 2001, Ariba announced that it would acquire Agile Software in a $2.55 billion stock swap. By April, with Ariba facing a disappointing second quarter and cutting a third of its workforce, the deal had fallen apart.

In early 2004, Ariba acquired FreeMarkets which gave the company a software package in the upstream (sourcing) of the sourcing process. Following the acquisition of FreeMarkets, Kent Parker was named as Executive Vice President, Ariba Global Services Organization. In 2007, Parker was named COO of Ariba.

In late 2007, Ariba bought the company Procuri for $93 million, which enhanced the company's client base and on-demand abilities.

In November 2010, Ariba announced that it would acquire Quadrem, a privately held Marketplace for the mining industry. The acquisition closed in January 2011.

In October 2011 Ariba announced the acquisition of b-process, a privately held French company and European leader in electronic invoicing service provider, for approximately €35 million in cash.

=== Acquisition by SAP ===
On May 22, 2012, the German business software maker SAP SE announced that it planned to acquire Ariba for an estimated $4.3 billion. SAP said it would pay $45 a share. JPMorgan Chase and Deutsche Bank AG advised SAP SE on the sale, while Morgan Stanley provided financial counsel to Ariba. Ariba's shareholders approved the acquisition on August 29, 2012, and it was completed on October 1, 2012, for $4.4 billion.

=== Life after SAP ===
In January 2016 Ariba underwent a rebranding to SAP Ariba. As of 2026 it remains the brand used by SAP for all of its Procurement software.

== Services ==
SAP Ariba is one of the leading procurement solution providers. The company now only sells the cloud version of the product in the market as part of the SAP Business Suite of Applications. Customers using the On Premise versions migrated to the cloud version.

== Business Network ==
Launched in 1999 as the Ariba Network, linking companies together for B2B transactions, the SAP Business Network supports over $6 trillion in annual transactions as of 2025.

== Controversies ==
In December 2008, Ariba announced that the U.S. District Court for the Eastern District of Texas had issued an injunction against Emptoris, which prohibits the company from infringing on two of Ariba's patents related to overtime and bid ceilings in reverse auctions. On 16 December 2008, the court ordered Emptoris to pay an enhanced damages award of $1.4 million for willful infringement in connection with Emptoris’ infringement of the two reverse auction-patents held by Ariba. This was in addition to the 29 October 2008 jury award of $5 million in damages to Ariba, bringing the total fine to approximately $6.4 million, a significant penalty for Emptoris which earned approximately $50 million in revenue for 2008. In an Emptoris press release, that company noted that it had released a new software "patch" that eliminates any infringement. The U.S. District Court, in February 2009, issued an order noting that the "patch" is colorably different, effectively concluding the case.

== See also ==
- SAP Concur
