= Caribou Coffee =

American coffee shop chain

Caribou Coffee Company
- Caribou Coffee Logo Logo since 2010

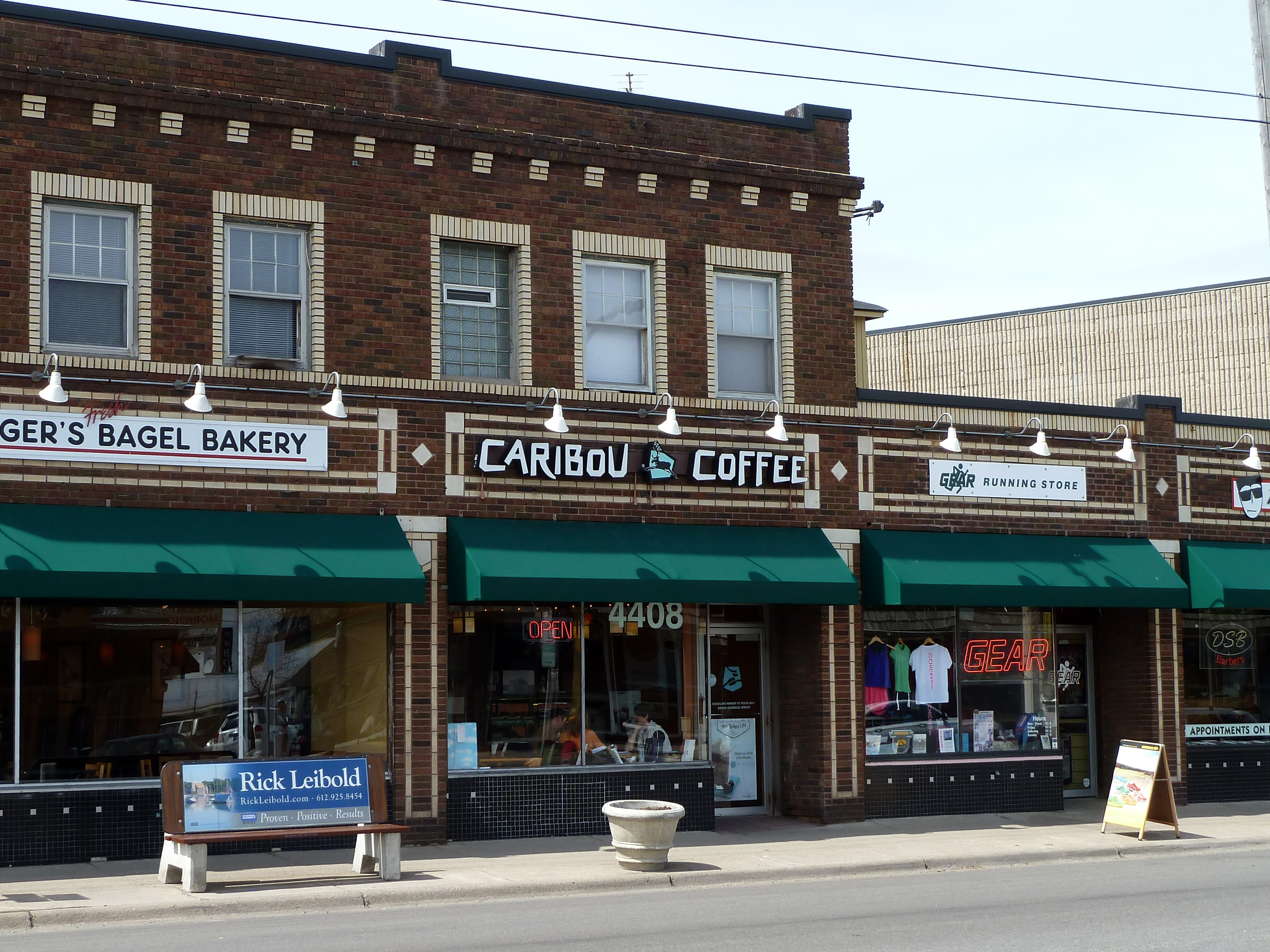
- Original Caribou Coffee in Edina, Minnesota
- Type: Private
- Industry: Retail coffee and tea Franchising
- Founded: December 14, 1992; 33 years ago Edina, Minnesota, United States
- Headquarters: Brooklyn Center, Minnesota, United States
- Key people: John Butcher (president & CEO) Giancarlo Moreira (Board of Directors)
- Number of employees: 7,000+
- Parent: JAB Holding Company
- Website: www.cariboucoffee.com

Caribou Coffee Company is an American coffee company and coffeehouse chain. It was founded in Edina, Minnesota, in 1992. As of July 2024, the company operates over 800 locations worldwide. It is headquartered in Brooklyn Center, Minnesota.

== History ==
=== 1990s ===
Caribou Coffee founder John Puckett was working as a management consultant for Boston-based management consulting firm Bain & Company, when he decided he wanted to become an entrepreneur. After a trip to Denali National Park in Alaska, he and his wife, Kim, decided to raise money and start a coffee company. His wife stayed with a job at General Motors while John moved to Minnesota to find the first site and put together financing.

The initial concept for Caribou was a five-day-a-week schedule aimed at downtown office workers, mimicking what worked in Boston. Puckett signed a lease for the first location to be in the large Pillsbury Center office building. However, soon afterward the building's landlord decided not to sign the lease, because another of the building's retail tenants had exclusive rights to selling coffee in the building and had threatened to sue them. As a result, the financing for the store fell through because it was dependent on that specific site. Puckett opted to start looking for an available location in the suburbs, and the first Caribou Coffee shop was started in Edina, Minnesota, a suburb of Minneapolis, in December 1992.

In 1994, Puckett recruited Kent Parker, his roommate from Dartmouth business school, to help grow the company.

=== 2000s ===
In 2003, Michael J. Coles was named CEO. On September 29, 2005, Caribou launched its IPO listed on NASDAQ under CBOU. CEO Coles recalls: "Two years after I took over, we expanded to 337 stores in fourteen states and the District of Columbia. In less than three years, Caribou went from a company with negative sales growth to a public company listed on NASDAQ." In 2006, Arcapita (formerly known as First Islamic Investment Bank) was Caribou Coffee's majority shareholder. In 2002, Yusuf al-Qaradawi's involvement with the bank led to a protest of Caribou Coffee. That same year al-Qaradawi stepped down as chairman of the bank's Sharia Board. As of 2009, Caribou employed more than 6,000 people.

=== 2010s ===
In December 2012, the company was taken private in a $340 million deal by German equity company JAB Holding Company. Following the merger, it was stated that Caribou Coffee would continue to be operated as an independent company with its own brand, management team and growth strategy, and that Caribou would continue to be based in Minneapolis.

In May 2013, Caribou Coffee announced plans to close 80 stores in Ohio, Michigan, Pennsylvania, Washington D.C., Maryland, Virginia, Georgia, Illinois, and Eastern Wisconsin, with 88 others in those locations to be converted to Peet's Coffee & Tea during 2013–2014. Caribou locations would remain open in California, Colorado, Georgia, Iowa, Illinois, Indiana, Kansas, Michigan, Minnesota, Missouri, North Carolina, North Dakota, Nebraska, Ohio, Oklahoma, South Dakota, Virginia, Wisconsin, Wyoming, and ten international markets.

In 2019, John Butcher replaced Sarah Spiegel as CEO. On August 5, 2021, Caribou announced that it had merged with Panera Bread and Einstein Bros. Bagels to form Panera Brands. After four years in private hands, on November 8, 2021, Panera Brands filed paperwork for an initial public offering of stock.

Caribou Coffee has 282 franchised outlets across nine international markets, including Bahrain, Egypt, Kuwait, Morocco, Oman, Qatar, Saudi Arabia, Turkey, United Arab Emirates and the Bosnia and Herzegovina.

On December 20, 2018, the company notified its customers of a potential data breach that they discovered in late November of that year. The breach also affected other companies owned by JAB Holding Company, namely Bruegger's and Einstein Bros. Bagels, and included the release of credit card numbers and CVV codes.

The company announced the closure of its Sycamore Hy-Vee location after 14 years in July 2025, and later reported plans to close its Ferndale and Allen Park locations in March 2026.

== See also ==
- List of coffeehouse chains
