= Digital transaction management =

Category of cloud services designed to digitally manage document-based transactions

Digital transaction management (DTM) is a category of cloud services designed to digitally manage document-based transactions. DTM removes the friction inherent in transactions that involve people, documents, and data to create faster, easier, more convenient, and secure processes. DTM goes beyond content and document management to include e-signatures, authentication and non-repudiation; enabling co-browsing between the customer and the business; document transfer and certification; secure archiving that goes beyond records management; and a variety of meta-processes around managing electronic transactions and the documents associated with them.

DTM standards are proposed and managed by the xDTM Standard Association. The association released the first version of its standard on 24 March 2016, setting out eight core requirements that a compliant DTM provider is expected to meet.

Aragon Research has estimated that "by YE 2016, 70% of large enterprises will have a DTM initiative underway or fully implemented."

Aragon has described DTM as a fast-growing but immature category, estimating in 2019 that it was expanding at over 25% a year. Its annual Aragon Research Globe for the category evaluated 16 providers in 2018 and 19 in 2019, among them Adobe, Citrix Systems, Docusign, HelloSign, Kofax, Nintex and SignNow.
