= JP Morgan Personal Investing =

British investment management company

- Type: Subsidiary
- Industry: Investment management
- Founded: 2011
- Founder: Nick Hungerford
- Headquarters: Canary Wharf, London
- Key people: Nick Hungerford; Martin Stead; James McManus; William Reeve
- Parent: JP Morgan
- Website: www.personalinvesting.jpmorgan.com

JP Morgan Personal Investing is an online discretionary investment management company or robo-adviser based in London. The company was founded as Nutmeg Saving and Investment Limited in 2011.

== History ==
Nutmeg was founded in 2011 by Nick Hungerford (1980–2023) and William Todd. In 2016, Nick Hungerford stepped down as CEO, being replaced by Martin Stead, formerly Nutmeg's CMO.

In 2019, The Economist described Nutmeg as a "hit fintech startup" and as being a client of Carta, a firm that keeps track of the stakes in companies.

Martin Stead left the company in 2019, following a loss of £18.6 million, at that point yet to make a profit. Nutmeg managed portfolios worth £1.9 billion as of December 2019.

The company had around 80,000 customers and managed £2bn in assets as of January 2020.

The company was purchased by JP Morgan for a reported £700m in June 2021.

In October 2021, JP Morgan announced that it would rebrand Nutmeg as JP Morgan Personal Investing.

== Operations ==
JP Morgan Personal Investing's investment division manages customer assets. It primarily uses Exchange-traded funds (ETFs) as their vehicle for investing customers’ funds.

JP Morgan Personal Investing is an online discretionary investment management company (discretionary meaning that it makes all investment decisions on behalf of its customers, rather than providing a platform for people to trade on). The company invests customers’ funds in line with their investment goals and appetite for risk. It invests in listed securities, debt, cash, commodities and other investment asset classes, primarily, but not exclusively, via exchange-traded funds (ETFs). It provides an online alternative to stockbroker platforms where customers make their own trading decisions.
