= Arcapita =

Holding and real estate company

Arcapita Group
- Type: Holding company
- Industry: Financial services
- Founded: 1997
- Headquarters: Bahrain Bay, Manama, Bahrain
- Number of locations: United States, United Kingdom, Bahrain, Saudi Arabia, Singapore
- Key people: Atif A. Abdulmalik, Chief Executive officer Hisham Al Raee, Deputy Chief Executive Officer; Martin Tan, Chief Investment Officer; Mohammed Chowdhury, Chief Financial Officer
- Products: Private equity, real estate
- Parent: Arcapita Group Holdings
- Subsidiaries: Arcapita Investment Management B.S.C.(c); Arcapita Group Holdings Limited Arcapita Investment Management US Inc.; Arcapita Investment Management Singapore Pte; Arcapita Investment Advisors UK Limited; Arcapita Capital Company
- Website: arcapita.com

Arcapita founded in 1997, is an asset management firm. Headquartered in Manama, Bahrain, Arcapita also operates from its offices in the United States, the United Kingdom, Saudi Arabia, and Singapore. The firm serves a group of investors in the Middle East region including investment firms, family offices, high net-worth individuals, and sovereign wealth funds. Arcapita completed over 100 investments in the United States, Europe, the Middle East, and Asia for a total transaction value exceeding $30 billion. The board of directors contain nine members, mainly from the Gulf Cooperation Council. Members are chairs, previous chairpersons, or current Chief Executive Officers of sovereign wealth funds, regional investment firms or global financial services firms.

== History ==
Arcapita was founded in 1997. Around that time, Islamic banking started to gain popularity, but the industry lacked Sharia compliant investment opportunities. Arcapita's Sharia compliant model was created offering private equity and real estate alternative investments. Arcapita's first exit was Computer Generation Incorporated in December 2000.

In 2003, Arcapita opened a London office. In the year that followed, Arcapita acquired Church's Chicken, a quick-serve chicken restaurant chain, based in the United States. In 2005, First Islamic Bank, Crescent Capital Inc. and Crescent Capital Europe rebranded to Arcapita to unify their global brand across three offices in Atlanta, Bahrain, and London.

Arcapita recorded a performance of $360 million in fiscal year 2008, and extended their geographical presence by opening an office in Singapore that would handle investments in Asia. In 2010, Arcapita moved its head office to Bahrain Bay.

In 2013, Arcapita completed its restructuring which was initiated in 2012. This restructure was due to the effects of the world economic crises that lead Arcapita to file for Chapter 11. A year later, Arcapita raised a new equity capital from shareholders to fund its growth strategy. In 2017, Arcapita along with Mumtalakat Holding Company, acquired a controlling interest in NAS United Healthcare Service, making it Arcapita's first private equity investment since the capital raise. In 2017, Arcapita acquired branding firm Stratus; they then sold the firm to Vestar Capital Partners for an enterprise value of more than $450 million, reportedly three times the value at the time of Arcapita's purchase.

In April 2021, Arcapita announced the purchase of the Cedardale Distribution Center in Dallas used by FedEx. The value of Arcapita's US industrial real estate portfolio became over $200 million after the acquisition.

== Portfolio ==
=== Private equity ===
Arcapita acquires interest in midsized companies with an emphasis on the United States, and the Middle East.

Arcapita's private equity portfolio contains 6 active and 41 exited investments. Some past investments include:

- Freightliner Group Limited – a UK rail logistics company – Acquired in 2008, exited in 2015.
- Church's Chicken – a quick-service chicken restaurant chain – Acquired in 2004, exited in 2009.
- PODS – provider of portable storage and moving solutions for residential and business customers. Acquired in 2007, exited in 2015.
- J Jill – retailer of women's apparel, accessories and footwear – Acquired in 2011, exited in 2015.
- Caribou Coffee Company, Inc. – an international retail coffee business – Acquired in 2000, exited in 2011.
- South Staffordshire – water utility company that supplies water in the English Midlands – Acquired in 2004, exited in 2007.
- Roxar – an independent technology services company, dedicated to developing solutions to optimize reservoir production for the global oil and gas industry – Acquired in 2006, exited in 2007.
- Stratus – the sole nationwide provider of signage and lighting services in the US – Acquired in 2018 and exited in 2021.
- NAS Neuron – a leading third-party administrator of medical claims in the GCC – Acquired in 2017, exited in 2020.

=== Real estate ===
Arcapita acts as principal, arranger and manager of real estate investments, and has completed transactions worth $13 billion. Arcapita focuses of the following sectors: industrial and logistics assets, and rental housing, which includes senior living and student housing communities. Arcapita currently has 16 real estate investments under its management, and over 50 exited investments. Past real estate investments include:

- ARC Real Estate Income Fund – a joint venture with Al Rajhi fund to acquire logistics and retail properties – Vintage year 2010, exited in 2015.
- Arcapita Senior Living – a series of investments as part of a joint venture with Sunrise Senior Living to acquire assisted living properties in the United States. Vintage years 2002–2005, exited in 2006–2015.
- Riffa Views – joint venture with Bahrain International Golf Course Company to develop a golf course residential community – Vintage year 2004, exited in 2014.
- Arcapita Asian Industrial Yielding I – a joint venture with Mapletree Investments Pte Ltd, to acquire industrial properties in Singapore, which was exited via an initial public offering (IPO) on the Singapore Exchange (SGX). Vintage year 2008, exited 2010.
- Mutlifamily I – a series of investments as part of a joint venture with Archstone-Smith to acquire apartment complexes in the United States. Vintage year 2000, exited in 2005.
- Bahrain Bay – a mixed-use waterfront development – Vintage year 2005.

== Compliance with Shari'ah ==
Every investment made by Arcapita and its subsidiaries is approved by a four-member Shari'ah advisory board. In accordance with Islamic Shari'ah law, the company does not invest in any businesses which offer credit or charge interest, or any other product that conflicts with Shari'ah law. According to representatives of the company, the Shari'ah advisory board does not make decisions about the financial merits of investments, and does not play a role in hiring or promotion of employees.
