= Tradex Technologies =

Tradex Technologies Inc.
- Industry: B2B e-commerce
- Founded: 1996; 30 years ago
- Founder: Daniel Aegerter
- Defunct: March 8, 2000; 26 years ago
- Fate: Acquired by SAP Ariba
- Headquarters: Tampa

Tradex Technologies Inc. was a developer of Java-based B2B e-commerce software. It primarily operated in the industries of financial services, telecommunications, plastics, and foodservice. It offered a platform for vertical trading hubs, another for large enterprises, and a third for the distributor channel segment. The software used JavaBeans technology.

At the peak of the dot-com bubble in March 2000, SAP Ariba acquired Tradex for 19 million shares of Ariba stock, then worth $5.6 billion.

The company received 60% of revenue from licensing its software, 30% from support services, and 10% from transaction fees. Nippon Telegraph and Telephone was the largest customer of the company and VerticalNet was also a customer.

== History ==
The company was founded by Daniel Aegerter as an Internet-based system for automating the purchase of computer peripherals for electronic publishing, which were distributed by his company, Dynabit.

At first, in 1996, Tradex offered a wholesale marketplace for computer equipment, with 40 vendors offering 15,000 products. In 1999, the company had 180 employees and 480 customers.

In 1996, it received an award from the Gartner Group and InformationWeek as the best Internet B2B e-commerce solution.

Revenues in 1998 were estimated to be less than $5 million.

By September 1999, the company had raised $28 million from investors including Internet Capital Group, Sigma Partners, Apex Investment Partners, Draper Fisher Jurvetson, First Analysis Corporation, Imlay Investments, and United Parcel Service.

In 1999, it was negotiation a headquarters move to Atlanta. It also had offices in Boston, Dallas, Tampa, San Francisco, Washington D.C., London and Tokyo.

In December 1999, Ariba announced the acquisition of Tradex for stock then valued at $1.86 billion.

In January 2000, the company reached a reselling agreement with JD Edwards.

On March 8, 2000, at the height of the dot com bubble, Ariba completed the acquisition. Ariba shares had tripled since the announcement of the acquisition 4 months earlier and Tradex was therefore valued at $5.6 billion, making Daniel Aegerter a billionaire on paper.
