= Emptoris =

American technology

Emptoris Inc.
- Company type: Subsidiary
- Industry: Strategic supply, category spend and enterprise contract management solutions
- Founded: 1999
- Founder: Avner Schneur
- Headquarters: Burlington, Massachusetts, U.S.
- Area served: Worldwide
- Products: Spend analysis, sourcing, contract management, supplier lifecycle management, services procurement, strategic supply management suite, telecom expense management, virtual supplier master, program management, event monitoring services
- Number of employees: 725
- Website: IBM Procurement Solutions

Emptoris is a brand within IBM's commerce portfolio.

== History ==
Emptoris was founded in 1999 by Avner Schneur. When acquired by IBM, Emptoris was a developer and provider of strategic supply and contract management software including applications for spend analysis, sourcing, contract management, supplier lifecycle management, services procurement, compliance management and telecom expense management.

In January 2011, the company announced the acquisition of Rivermine, Inc., a provider of telecom expense management (TEM) solutions. In May 2011, Emptoris acquired Xcitec, a provider of supplier management software headquartered in Munich, Germany. With these two acquisitions, the company had six applications, more than 350 Global 1000 customers, over 725 employees globally, and combined projected annual growth in excess of 20%.

In August 2011, Emptoris was included on the 2011 Inc. 5000 list of the fastest-growing private companies. The company has partner relationships with management consulting firms including Accenture, Deloitte and IBM. The company's solutions can be deployed on-premises or via a software-as-a-service ("SaaS") model. The company is headquartered in Burlington, MA, USA, and has operations in Fairfax, VA; Reading, UK, Munich, Germany; Shanghai, China, and Pune, India, among other locations.

On December 15, 2011, IBM announced a deal to acquire Emptoris as part of its "Smarter Commerce" initiative. On February 1, 2012, IBM announced the completion of the acquisition of Emptoris.

On May 17, 2017, IBM announced a strategic partnership with SAP Ariba. IBM would be sunsetting Emptoris products and directing customers to SAP Ariba.

== Acquisitions ==
- On February 1, 2012, IBM announced the completion of the acquisition of Emptoris.
- On December 15, 2011, IBM announced a deal to acquire Emptoris to expand Smarter Commerce initiative.
- On May 4, 2011, Emptoris announced the acquisition of Xcitec, a provider of supplier management solutions headquartered in Munich, Germany.
- On January 6, 2011, Emptoris announced the acquisition of Rivermine, Inc., a telecom expense management company.
- On May 15, 2009, Emptoris announced the acquisition of the Contract and Service Management (CSM) solutions and business from Click Commerce, Inc. This acquisition expanded the Emptoris product suite to include services procurement.
- On July 20, 2006, Emptoris announced the acquisition of MINDFLOW, a provider of inbound supply chain planning and sourcing optimization solutions.
- On April 10, 2006, Emptoris announced the acquisition of diCarta, a company that specializes in contract management software.
- On June 6, 2005, Emptoris announced the acquisition of Intigma, a provider of spend data management technology.
- On January 3, 2005, Emptoris announced the acquisition of supplier assessment company, Valuedge, Inc., whose software is used to audit the performance of business suppliers.
- On September 15, 2003, Emptoris announced the acquisition of Zeborg, a spend analytics firm.
